= List of Cuban singers =

The following is a list of noted Cuban singers.

== A ==
- Alexander Abreu
- Liset Alea
- Xiomara Alfaro
- Pacho Alonso
- Paulina Álvarez
- Tony Álvarez
- Eduardo Antonio
- Daymé Arocena
- Arema Arega

== B ==
- Juana Bacallao
- Patricio Ballagas
- Don Marino Barreto Jr.
- Abelardo Barroso
- La Dame Blanche
- Esther Borja
- Alfredo Brito
- Julio Brito
- Descemer Bueno
- Elena Burke
- Lena Burke
- Malena Burke

== C ==
- Elizabeth Caballero
- Félix B. Caignet
- Candyman
- Rey Caney
- Yilian Cañizares
- Isolina Carrillo
- Cascarita
- Isabella Castillo
- Teté Caturla
- Espiridiona Cenda
- Francisco Céspedes
- Willy Chirino
- Olga Chorens
- Adolfo Colombo
- Orlando Contreras
- Jorge Cordero
- Manuel Corona
- Celia Cruz
- Alex Cuba

== D ==
- Eusebio Delfín
- Dagoberto Planos Despaigne
- Barbarito Díez
- Dinio

== E ==
- Glenda del E
- Emily Estefan
- Gloria Estefan

== F ==
- Alberto Faya
- Roberto Faz
- Santiago Feliú
- Francisco Fellove
- Joseíto Fernández
- Lucio Fernandez
- Marlon Fernández
- Ibrahim Ferrer
- Paulito FG
- Roberto Fonseca
- Rosita Fornés
- Franco

== G ==
- Sindo Garay
- Fredesvinda García
- Odalys García
- Osmani García
- Blanca Rosa Gil
- Sara González Gómez
- Tito Gómez
- Celina González
- Enrique González "La Pulga"
- Graciela
- Bienvenido Granda
- Marcelino Guerra
- Guianko
- Amaury Gutiérrez
- Diego Gutiérrez
- Eglise Gutiérrez

== H ==
- Heradel
- Didier Hernández
- Chalía Herrera
- Liuba María Hevia
- Caridad Hierrezuelo
- Lorenzo Hierrezuelo

== I ==
- Chicho Ibáñez
- Polito Ibañez

== K ==
- Israel Kantor
- Kumar

== L ==
- Rolando Laserie
- Xiomara Laugart
- Margarita Lecuona
- Roberto Ledesma
- Lenier
- Pío Leyva
- Lucrecia
- Pedro Lugo
- La Lupe

== M ==
- Antonio Machín
- Machito
- Cheo Marquetti
- Maria Martínez
- Nelson Martinez
- Pedrito Martinez
- Ana Margarita Martínez-Casado
- Manolo Álvarez Mera
- Addys Mercedes
- Celeste Mendoza
- Haydée Milanés
- Pablo Milanés
- Haila Mompié
- Monguito
- Rita Montaner
- Polo Montañez
- Benny Moré

== N ==
- Brenda Navarrete
- Bola de Nieve

== O ==
- Faustino Oramas
- Rosario García Orellana
- Ovi

== P ==
- Marta Pérez
- Raúl Planas
- Guillermo Portabales
- Omara Portuondo
- Diamela del Pozo
- Margarita Pracatan
- Carlos Manuel Pruneda
- Carlos Puebla
- Adonis Puentes
- Puntillita
- Marilyn Pupo

== R ==
- Evelin Ramón
- María Remolá
- Gregorio Hernández Ríos
- Orlando "Puntilla" Ríos
- Panchito Riset
- Raquel Rodrigo
- Aldo Rodríguez
- Silvio Rodríguez
- Yotuel Romero
- Lázaro Ros
- Rey Ruiz
- Rosendo Ruiz

== S ==
- Pepe Sánchez
- Alex Sandunga
- Ñico Saquito
- Jon Secada
- Moraima Secada
- Compay Segundo

== T ==
- Chanel Terrero
- Leoni Torres
- Roberto Torres
- Malú Trevejo
- Trio Matamoros

== V ==
- Merceditas Valdés
- Miguelito Valdés
- Carlos Varela
- Lis Vega
- María Teresa Vera
- Dominica Verges
- Mayra Verónica
- Alberto Villalón

== Y ==
- Yusa

== Z ==
- Alberto Zayas

== See also ==
- Music of Cuba
