= Lágrimas negras (song) =

Song by Cuban group Trio Matamoros

"Lágrimas negras" (Spanish for Black Tears) is a bolero-son by Miguel Matamoros, first recorded by the Trío Matamoros in 1931. The song was written in Santo Domingo, in the Dominican Republic, in 1930, when Matamoros was on his way back to Cuba from the Ibero-American Exposition of 1929. The song has been described as the "perfect fusion of the son with the bolero". It became the Trío Matamoros' most famous song, along with "Son de la Loma".

== Recordings ==
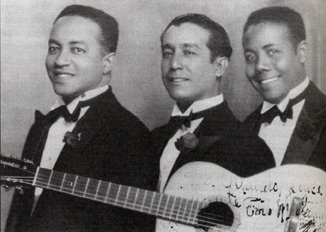
Trío Matamoros, around 1930. They recorded the first known version.

- Trío Matamoros
- Adalberto Álvarez
- Azul Azul
- Rubén Blades
- Compay Segundo (also in duo with Cesária Évora)
- Celia Cruz
- Celina González
- Dan Den
- Barbarito Díez
- José Feliciano
- Olga Guillot
- Orquesta Aragón
- Omara Portuondo
- María Dolores Pradera (also in with Cachao and Diego el Cigala)
- Rachael Price
- Adalberto Santiago
- Los Tres
- Bebo Valdés, Cachao and Carlos "Patato" Valdés: El Arte del Sabor
- Bebo Valdés & Diego el Cigala with Paquito D'Rivera: Lágrimas negras
- Chucho Valdés and Irakere
- Cuco Valoy
- María Teresa Vera
- Vieja Trova Santiaguera
- El Chacal
- Aymée Nuviola
- Cuarteto Patria (recorded with Eliades Ochoa)
- Peret
