= Juan Pablo Torres (musician) =

- Born: Juan Pablo Torres Morell; August 17, 1946; Puerto Padre, Cuba
- Died: April 17, 2005 (aged 58) Miami, Florida
- Genres: Songo, Afro-Cuban jazz, descarga
- Occupations: Musician, bandleader, composer, arranger, producer
- Instrument: Trombone
- Years active: 1966-2005
- Labels: EGREM, TropiJazz, RMM; Pimienta, Timba

Juan Pablo Torres Morell (August 17, 1946 – April 17, 2005) was a Cuban trombonist, bandleader, arranger and producer. He was the director of Algo Nuevo and a member of Irakere, two of the leading exponents of songo and Afro-Cuban jazz in the 1970s and 1980s. He has also directed various Cuban supergroups such as Estrellas de Areito and Cuban Masters. He has been called "one of the best trombone players in the Latin-jazz community of the 1990s".

== Life and career ==
Torres was born in Puerto Padre (former Oriente Province) on August 17, 1946. His father, who played trumpet and trombone, instilled a love of music in him from a young age. He began his musical work as euphonium player in the municipal band. Before graduating from the Escuela Nacional de Arte, Torres started his career Octavio Sánchez Cotán's ensemble. In the spring of 1967 he joined the Orquesta Cubana de Música Moderna (OCMM), a large jazz ensemble directed by Armando Romeu. Soon after in the early 1970s, he directed his own group with other members of the OCMM: Los Caneyes, which created the new rhythm "chikichaka". He also started his career as a producer in EGREM, Cuba's national record label. In 1979, he was chosen as director for the Estrellas de Areito, an all-star ensemble which recorded several albums of descargas, improvised jam sessions. In 1976, he founded his own group, Grupo Algo Nuevo, recording several seminal albums of the songo genre until its dissolution in 1984.

In the mid-1980s, Torres joined Irakere, which had been founded by former members of the OCMM, such as Chucho Valdés, Paquito D'Rivera and Arturo Sandoval. The latter two emigrated from Cuba to the United States in the 1980s, and Torres followed suit in 1992, when he decided to stay in Spain with his wife, Elsa, after the Zaragoza Conservatory offered them a teaching contract. In 1993, they relocated to the US, where he was a member of the TropiJazz All-Stars, Cuban Masters (which he directed) and the Caimán (Cobo Music) All Stars, three all-star ensembles similar to the Estrellas de Areito. During this time he continued to record and release solo albums, while also playing as a session musician with Bebo Valdés, Paquito D'Rivera, Juan Manuel Ceruto, and others. In 2002, he produced Generoso Jiménez's comeback album: Generoso qué bueno toca usted.

He contributed to several soundtracks, such as Henry IV (with music by Astor Piazzolla) by Marco Bellocchio and Para que no me olvides by Patricia Ferreira. The latter was his last recording session.

He died in Miami on April 17, 2005, from an inoperable brain tumor which caused him to fall into a coma. The compilation album A Life in Music was released shortly after his death.

== Style ==
His style has been described as the convergence of the two trends of Cuban trombone: the traditional trend, exemplified by Generoso Jiménez, and the jazz trend, spearheaded by Leopoldo "Pucho" Escalante. Torres considered himself influenced by jazz, but "always remembering [Félix] Chappottín".

== Awards and honours ==
In 2002, the album Cuban Masters by Los Originales featuring Juan Pablo Torres was nominated for the Latin Grammy Award for Best Traditional Tropical Album at the 3rd Annual Latin Grammy Awards, but lost to El Arte del Sabor by Bebo Valdés, Cachao and Carlos "Patato" Valdés. The following year it was nominated for Best Tropical Latin Album along with Generoso qué bueno toca usted, but lost again to El Arte del Sabor.

== Discography ==
- 1975: Y viva la felicidad (Areito)
- 1976: Mangle (Areito)
- 1977: Súper-son (Areito)
- 1977: Con todos los hierros (Areito)
- 1977: Cuba romántica (Areito)
- 1978: Algo Nuevo (Areito)
- 1981: Grupo Algo Nuevo (Areito)
- 1985: Yamina (Areito)
- 1990: Aerobics! (Areito)
- 1995: Trombone Man (TropiJazz)
- 1997: Pepper Trombone (RMM)
- 2000: Son qué chévere (Circular Move)
- 2001: Cuba Swings (Universal)
- 2002: Together Again (Pimienta)
- 2002: ¡Cómo pica! (Pimienta)
- 2003: Identidad (Timba)
- 2003: Afro-Cuban Trombone (Pimienta)

With Cuban Masters

- 2002: Los Originales (Pimienta)

With Maxo Séverin

- 2001: El tululu (Alizés)

== See also ==
- Generoso Jiménez
- Jesús "Aguaje" Ramos
