= Hierrezuelo =

Hierrezuelo is a surname. Notable people with the surname include:

- Caridad Hierrezuelo (1924–2009), Cuban singer
- Lorenzo Hierrezuelo (1907–1993), Cuban singer and composer
- Raydel Hierrezuelo (born 1987), Cuban volleyball player
- Reinaldo Hierrezuelo, Cuban singer and guitarist
