= Latin Grammy Award for Best Traditional Tropical Album =

- Awarded for: quality albums of the traditional tropical music genre
- Country: United States
- Presented by: The Latin Recording Academy
- First award: 2000
- Currently held by: Gloria Estefan for Raíces (2025)
- Website: latingrammy.com

The Latin Grammy Award for Best Traditional Tropical Album is an honor presented annually at the Latin Grammy Awards, a ceremony that recognizes excellence and creates a wider awareness of cultural diversity and contributions of Latin recording artists in the United States and internationally. The award goes to solo artists, duos, or groups for releasing vocal or instrumental albums containing at least 51% of new recordings in the traditional tropical music category which includes genres such as son, danzón, guaracha and bomba interpreted in a traditional style.

Musicians originating from Cuba have dominated the category though the award has also been presented to artists from Puerto Rico, Spain and the United States. It was first earned by Tito Puente with Mambo Birdland at the 1st Latin Grammy Awards ceremony held in 2000.

Cachao is the only artist to have won this category three times, the last one posthumously (the first one to be awarded in this fashion). Cachao also leads in number of nominations with four, followed by Ibrahim Ferrer and Eliades Ochoa with three nominations each. Buena Vista Social Club members have been nominated ten times combined, excluding the two nominations by Juan de Marcos González (with Afro-Cuban All Stars and Sierra Maestra, respectively).

== Winners and nominees ==
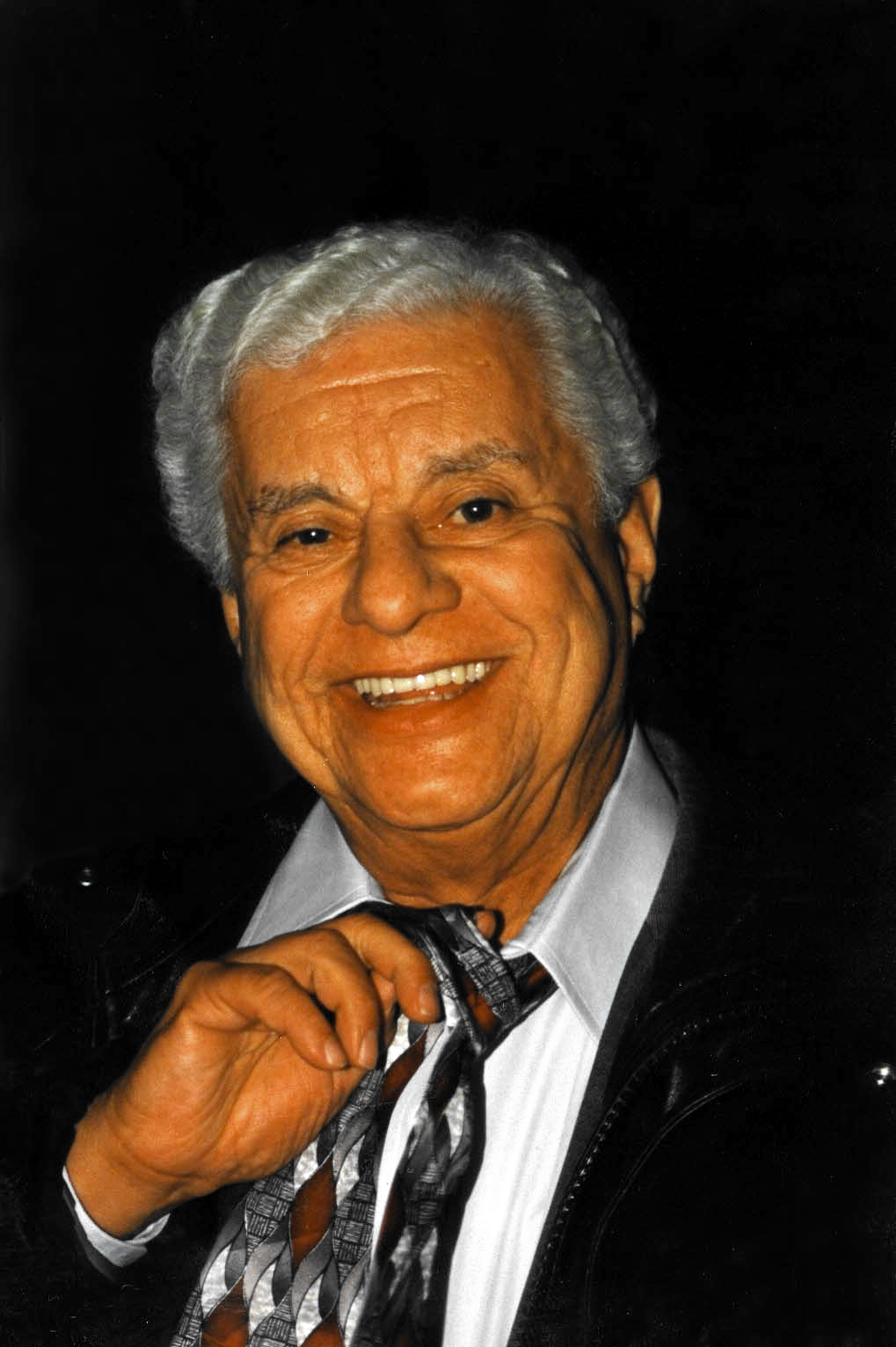
Tito Puente was the first winner of this category in 2000.

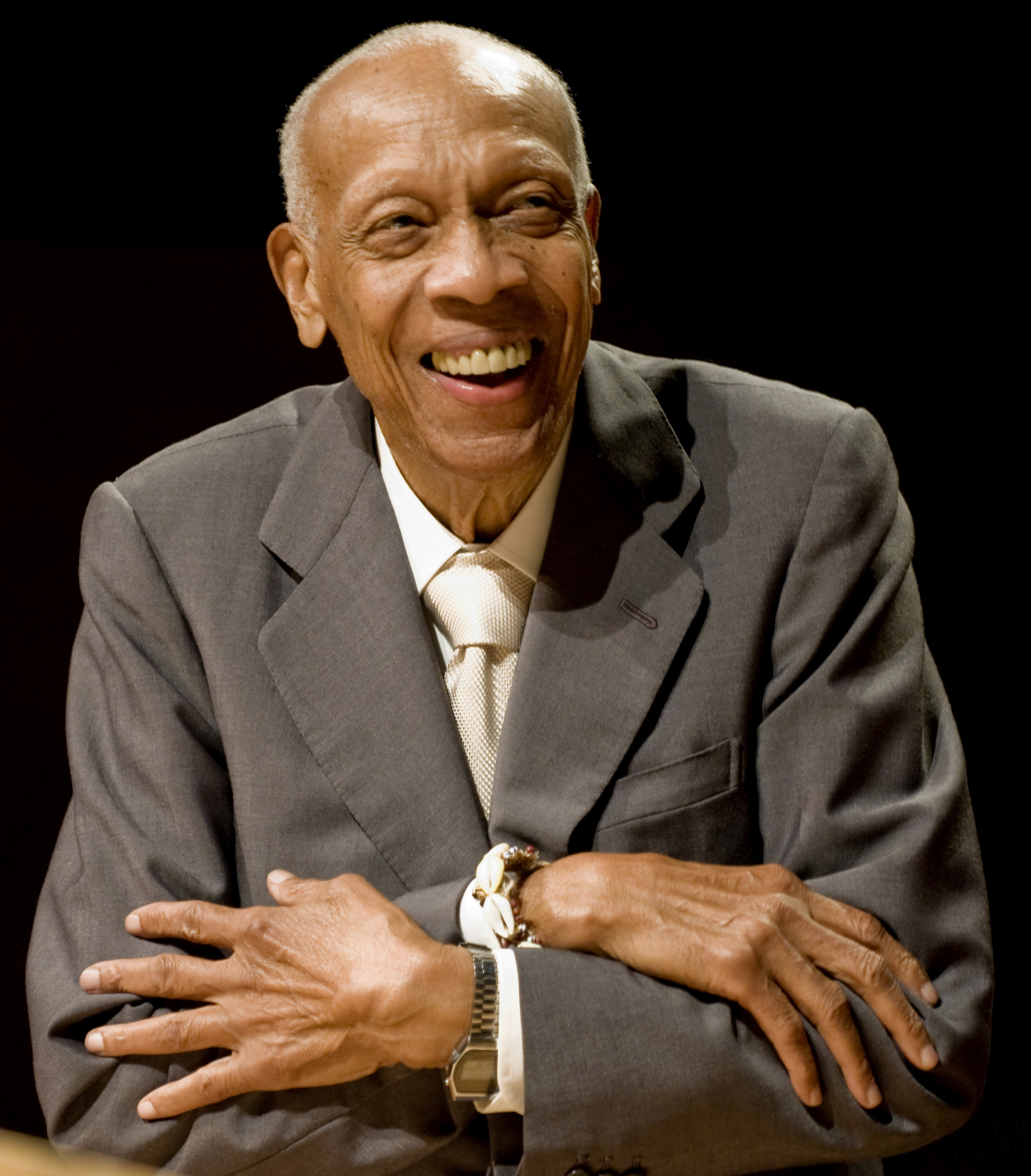
Bebo Valdés won this award twice, in 2002 with Israel López "Cachao" and Carlos "Patato" Valdés, and in 2004 with Diego El Cigala.

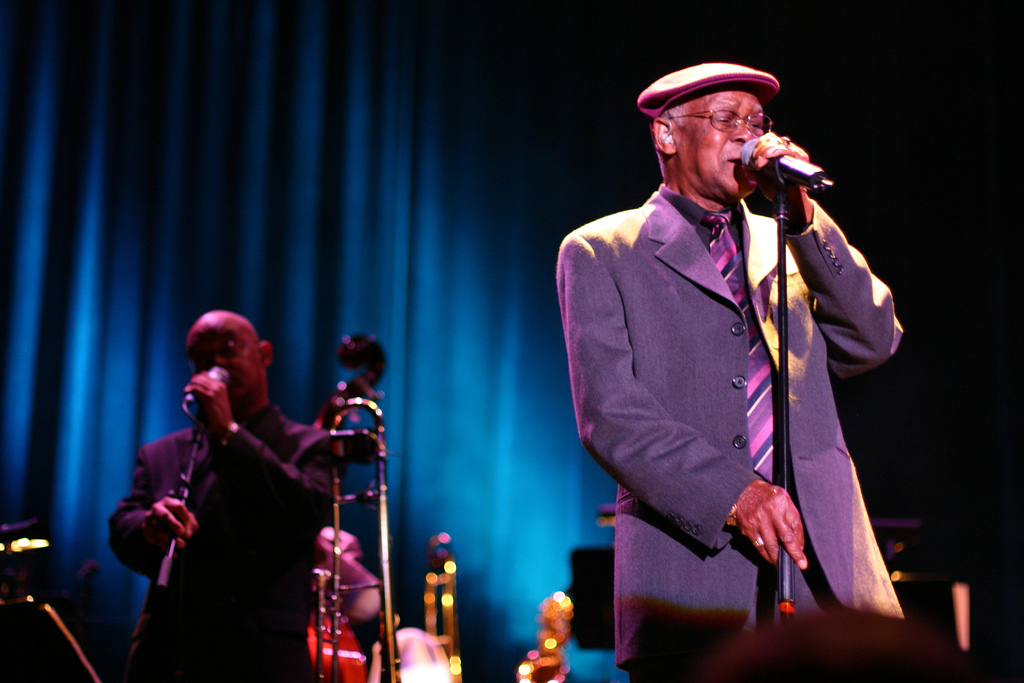
2003 winner Ibrahim Ferrer.

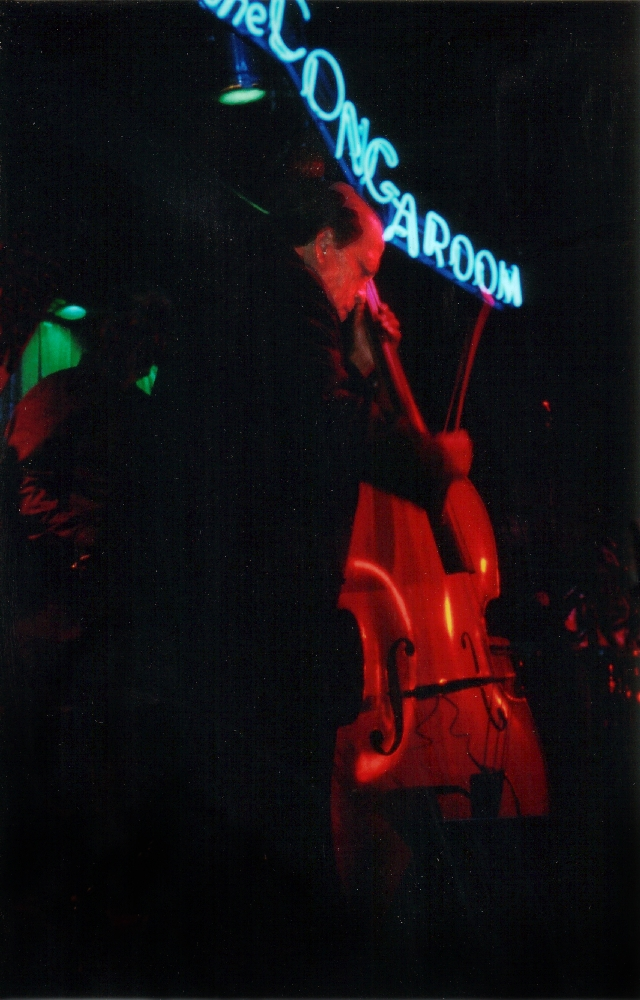
Deceased Cachao López received the award posthumously in 2011, having also won in 2002 and 2005. He also holds the record for most wins with three as well as most nominations with four.

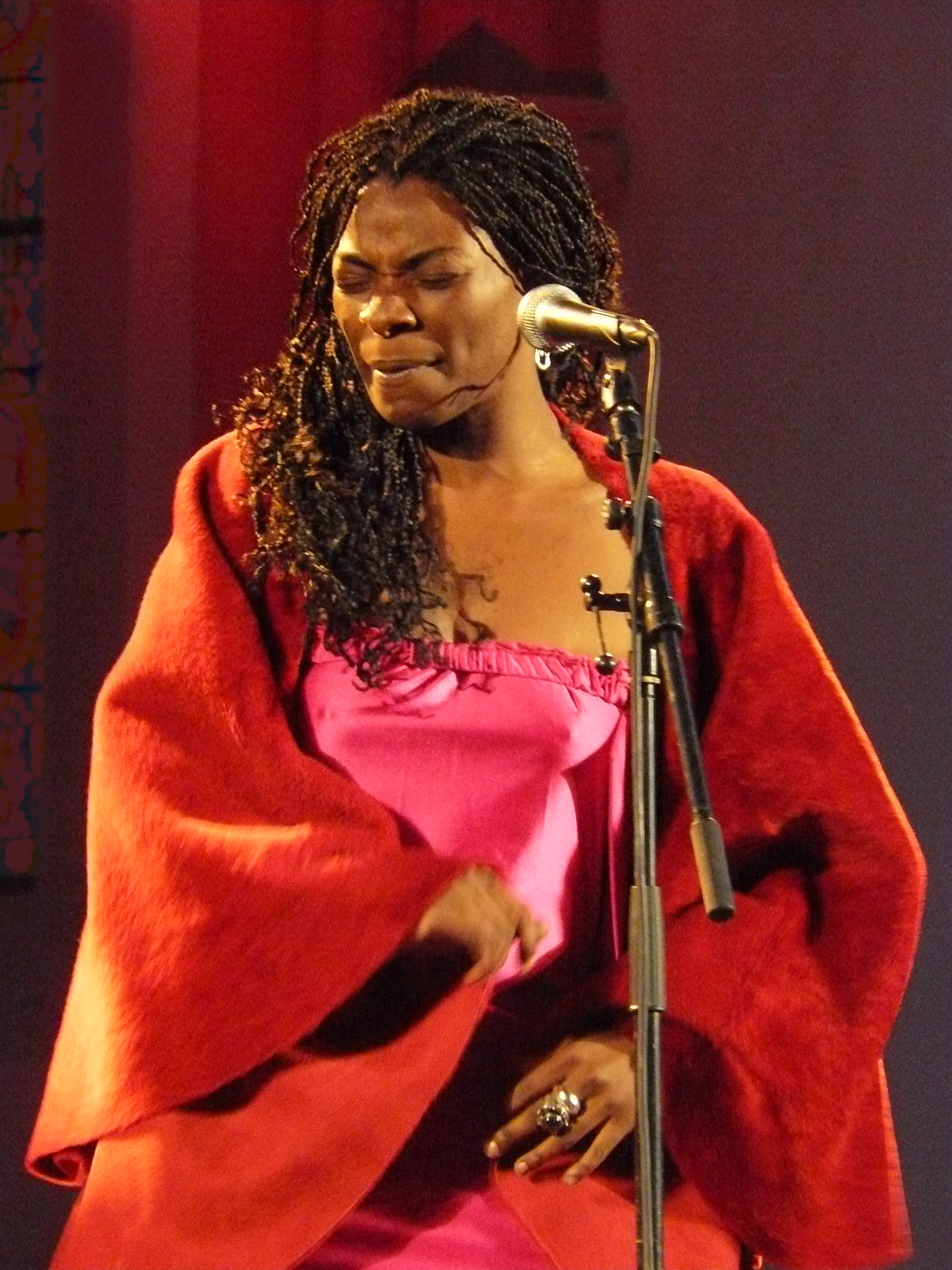
2010 winner Concha Buika.

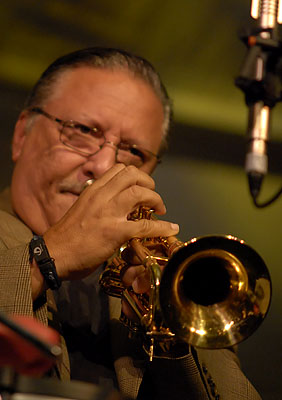
2013 winner Arturo Sandoval.

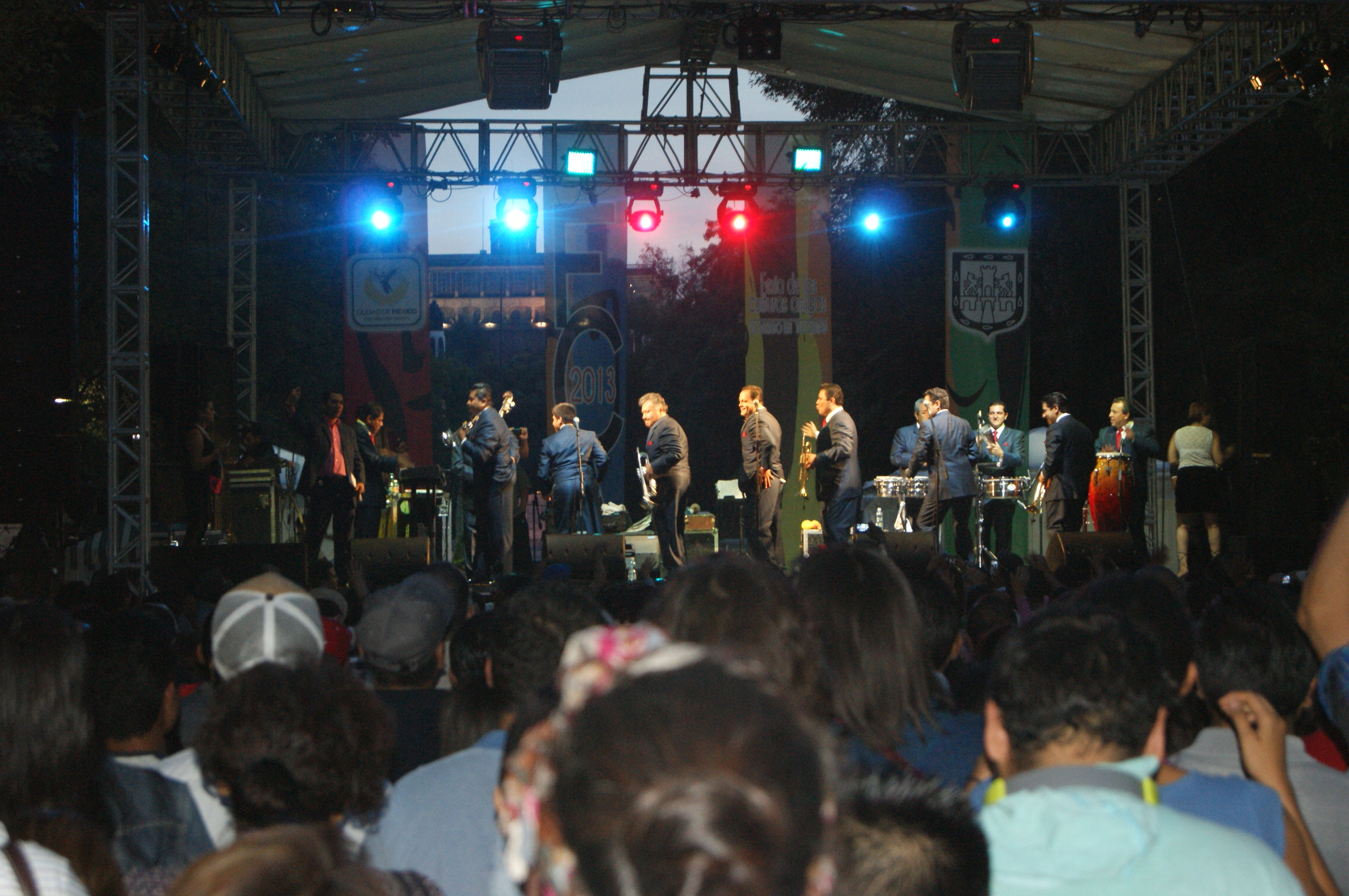
Two-time winners Sonora Santanera. They were also the first group to win the award.

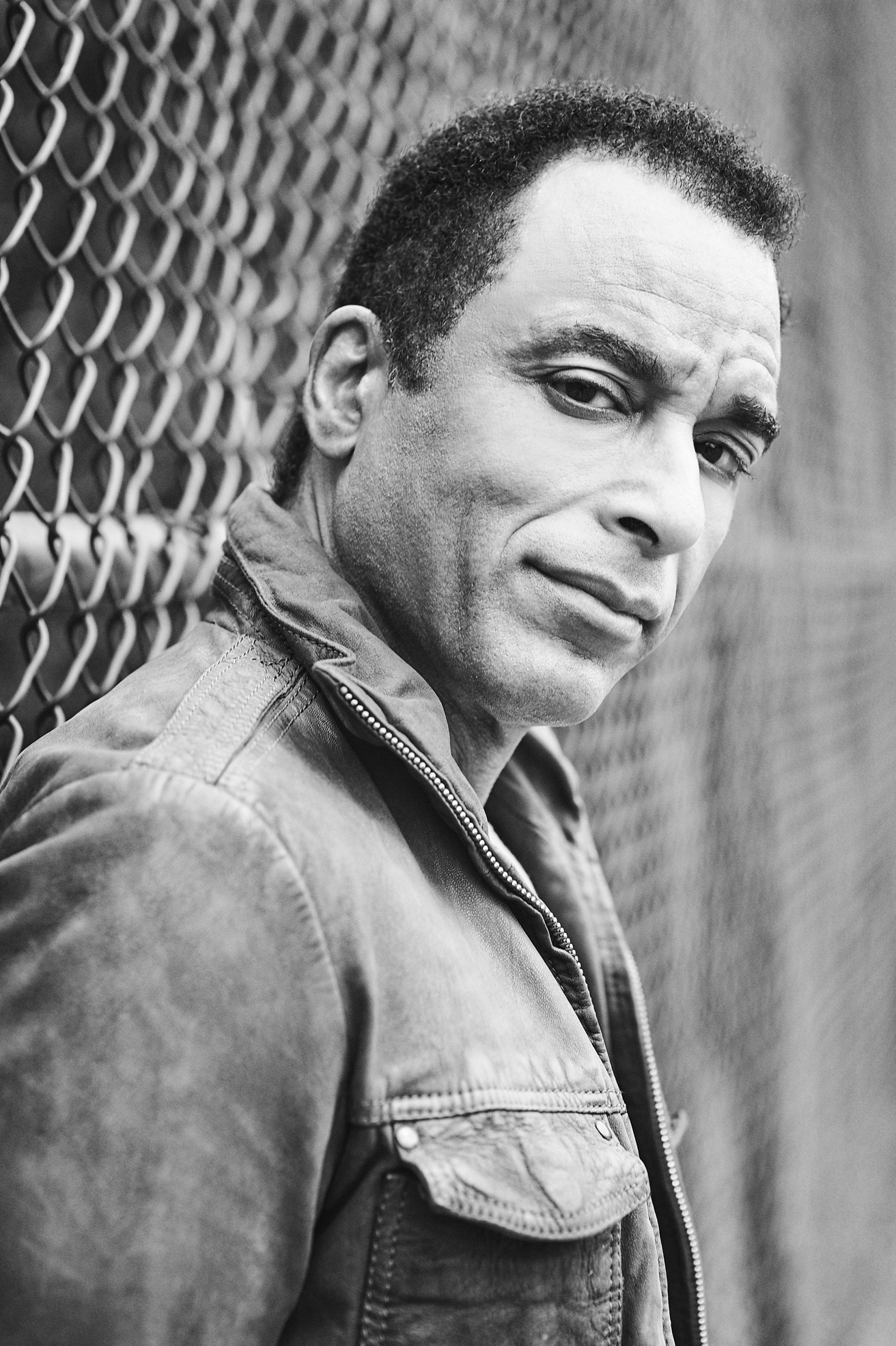
Jon Secada won in 2017 alongside The Charlie Sepúlveda Big Band.

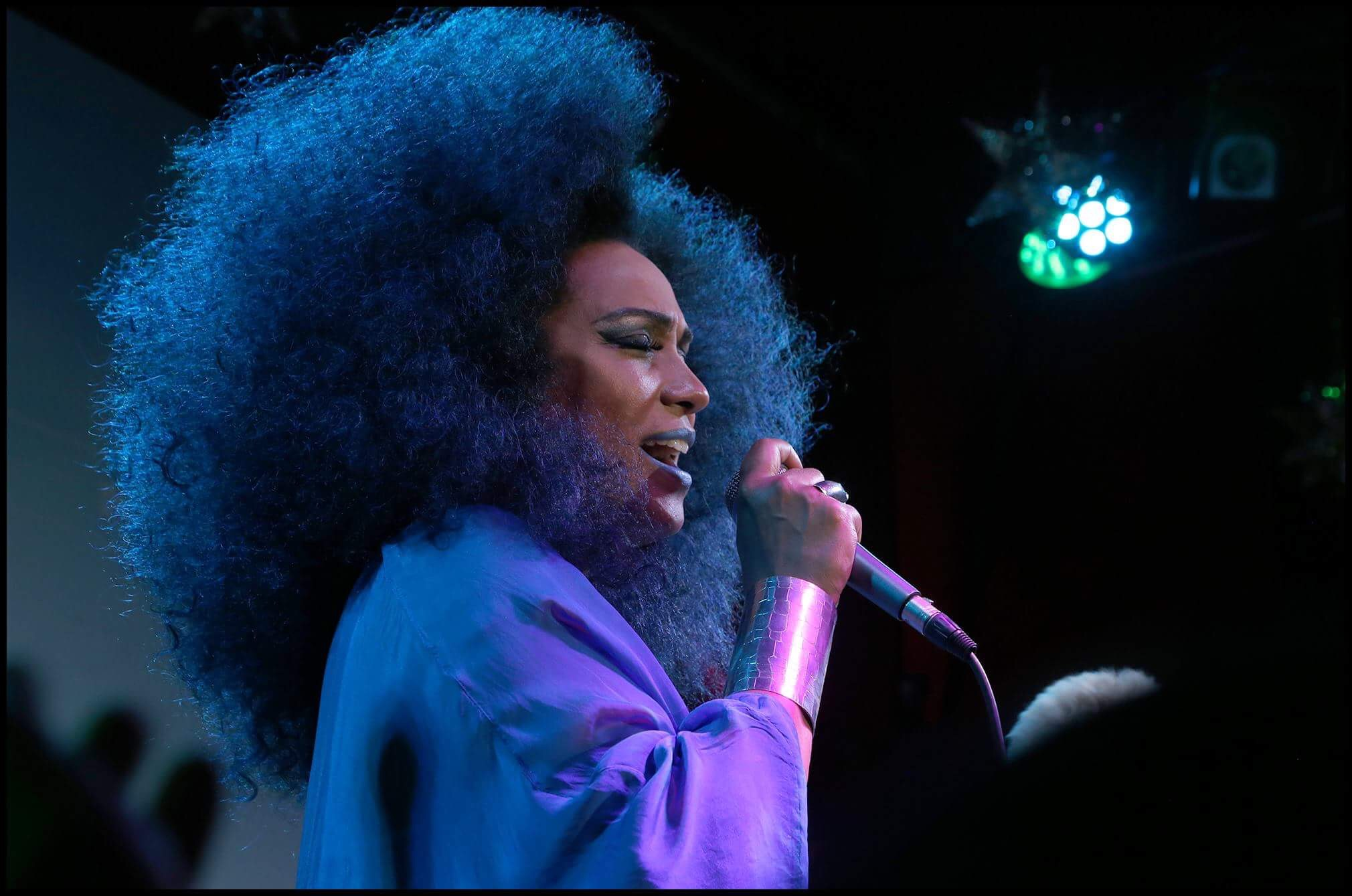
Cuban singer Aymée Nuviola won in 2022 with Gonzalo Rubalcaba.

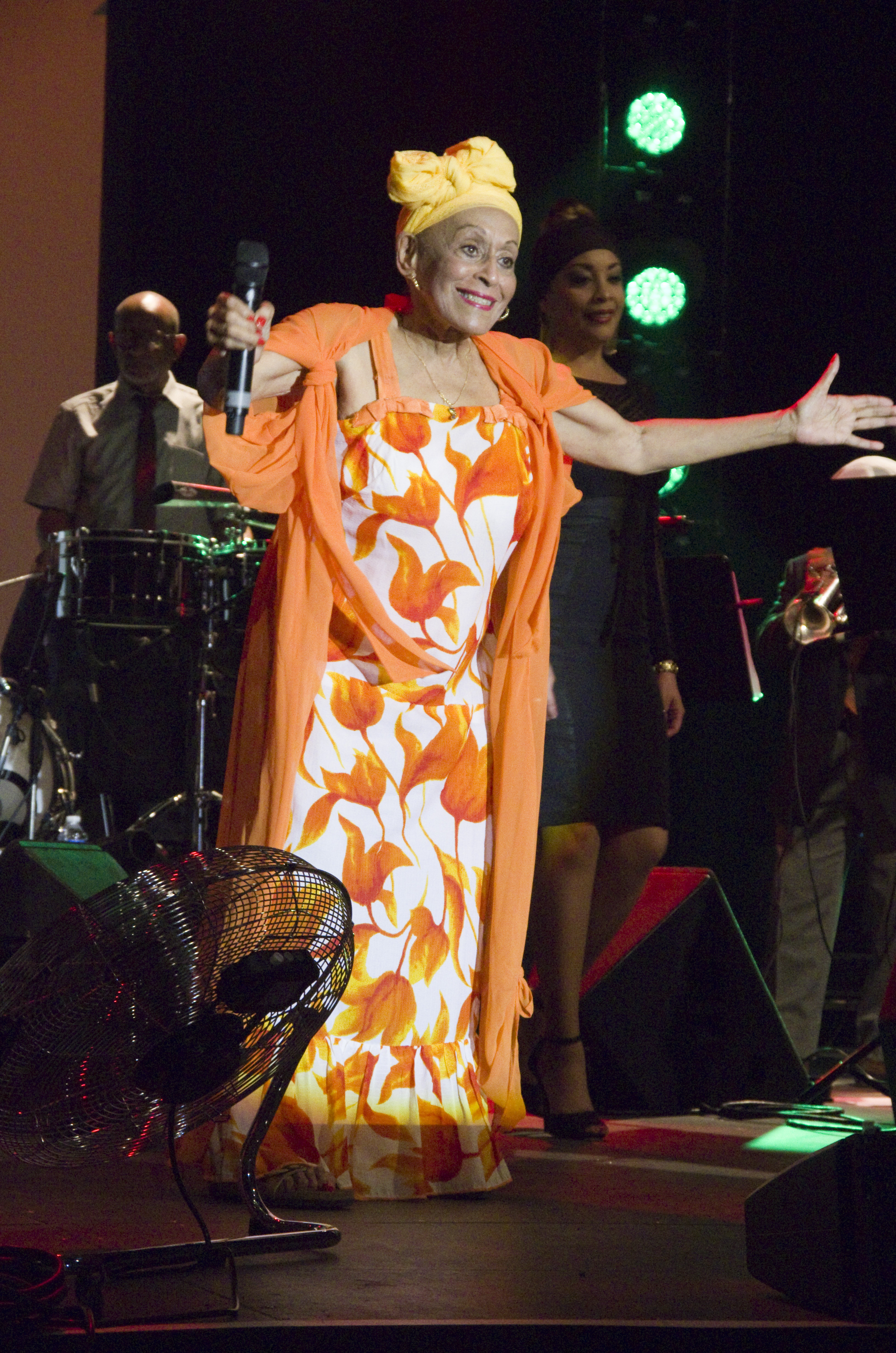
2023 winner Omara Portuondo.

| Year^{[I]} | Performing artist(s) | Work | Nominees | Ref. |
|---|---|---|---|---|
| 2000 | (United States) Tito Puente | Mambo Birdland | Joe Arroyo – En Sol Mayor; Cachao – Cuba Linda; Ibrahim Ferrer – Buena Vista Social Club Presents Ibrahim Ferrer; Carlos Vives – El Amor De Mi Tierra | |
| 2001 | (Cuba) Celia Cruz | Siempre Viviré | Celina González and Reutilio – 50 Años...Como Una Reina; Los Super Seven – Canto; Plena Libre – Mas Libre; Omara Portuondo – Buena Vista Social Club Presents Omara Portuondo | |
| 2002 | (Cuba) Bebo Valdés Trio with Israel López "Cachao" and Carlos "Patato" Valdés | El Arte del Sabor | Nelson González – Pa' Los Treseros; Totó la Momposina – Pacantó; Various Artists; Juan Pablo Torres (producer) – Cuban Masters – Los Originales; Charlie Zaa – De Un Solo Sentimiento | |
| 2003 | (Cuba) Ibrahim Ferrer | Buenos Hermanos | The Mambo All Stars Orchestra – 50 Years of Mambo; Polo Montañez – Guitarra Mía; Eliades Ochoa – Estoy Como Nunca; Plena Libre – Mi Ritmo | |
| 2004 | (Cuba) Bebo Valdés and (Spain) Diego El Cigala | Lágrimas Negras | Las Hermanas Márquez – Paquito D'Rivera Presents las Hermanas Márquez; Manny Manuel – Serenata; Danny Rivera and “El Topo” Antonio Cabán Vale – Amigos del Alma; Tropicana All Stars – Tropicana All Stars Recuerda A Benny Moré | |
| 2005 | (Cuba) Cachao | ¡Ahora Sí! | Manny Manuel – Nostalgia; Manuel "El Guajiro" Mirabal – Buena Vista Social Club Presents: Manuel Guajiro Mirabal; Omara Portuondo – Flor De Amor; Tropicana All Stars – Tradición | |
| 2006 | (Puerto Rico) Andy Montañez and (Cuba) Pablo Milanés | AM/PM Líneas Paralelas | Chucho Avellanet – Esta Noche Está Para Boleros; Juan de Marcos and the Afro-Cuban All Stars – Step Forward – The Next Generation; Compay Segundo – Siempre Compay; Melina León and Los Tri-O – Serenata En San Juan; Plena Libre – Evolución | |
| 2007 | (Puerto Rico) Bobby Cruz | Románticos De Ayer, Hoy y Siempre | Francisco Céspedes – Con El Permiso De Bola; Ibrahim Ferrer – Mi Sueño; La Charanga Cubana – A Comer Chicharrón; Alfredo Valdés Jr. – De La Habana A Nueva York | |
| 2008 | (United States) Gloria Estefan | 90 Millas | Albita, Rey Ruiz and Donato Poveda – Cuba: Un Viaje Musical; Chucho Avellanet with Trío Los Andinos – Bohemio; Edwin Colón Zayas – El Cuarto Puertorriqueño... Reafirmación; Victor Manuelle – Una Navidad A Mi Estilo | |
| 2009 | (Puerto Rico) Gilberto Santa Rosa | Una Navidad Con Gilberto | Orquesta América – Siempre A Punto; María Dolores Pradera y Los Sabandeños – Te Canto Un Bolero; Totó La Momposina – La Bodega; Orestes Vilató – It's About Time | |
| 2010 | (Spain) Concha Buika | El Último Trago | Pedro Jesus – Tributo a Orlando Contreras "El Jefe del Despecho"; Septeto Habanero – 90 Años, Orgullos de los Soneros; Sierra Maestra – Sonando Ya; Various Artists; Edesio Alejandro, Nelson Estevez & Juan Hidalgo (producers) – 100 Sones Cubanos | . |
| 2011 | (Cuba) Cachao | The Last Mambo | Albita – Toda Una Vida (Cuban Masterworks); Adalberto Álvarez – El Son de Altura; Esencia – Con La Fuerza de un Tren; Septeto Santiaguero – Oye Mi Son Santiaguero | |
| 2012 | (Cuba) Eliades Ochoa | Un Bolero Para Tí | Miguel García – Guarachando; Plenealo – Soy Yo; Quinteto Criollo – La Trova de Siempre; Son de Tikiza – Bolero | |
| 2013 | (Cuba) Arturo Sandoval | Un Siglo De Pasión | Lucy Fabery and Humberto Ramírez – Sentimentales; Miriam Ramos with Barbarito Torres, Ernán Lopez-Nussa and Rolando Luna – La Canción Cubana; Septeto Nacional Ignacio Piñeiro – La Habana Tiene Su Son; Septeto Santiaguero – Vamos Pa' la Fiesta | |
| 2014 | (Mexico) Sonora Santanera | Grandes Éxitos de las Sonoras: Con la Más Grande, La Sonora Santanera | Alquimia La Sonora del XXI – Sentimiento Anacobero; Eliades Ochoa y El Cuarteto Patria – El Eliades Que Soy; Pijuan and Los Baby Boomer Boys – Solo Pa' los Jóvenes... de Corazón; Viento de Agua – Opus IV | |
| 2015 | (Dominican Republic) José Alberto "El Canario" and Septeto Santiaguero | Tributo A Los Compadres No Quiero Llanto | Checo Acosta – #SiguedeModa; Rafael "Pollo" Brito – Homenaje A Tito Rodríguez; Alain Pérez – El Alma del Son – Tributo A Matamoros; Sonlokos – Locos Por El Son | |
| 2016 | (Mexico) Sonora Santanera | La Sonora Santanera En Su 60 Aniversario | Rafael Pollo Brito – Pa' Tío Simón; Jesús "Chino" Miranda – El Malquerido: Original Motion Picture Soundtrack; Septeto Nacional Ignacio Piñeiro – El Más Grande y Universal; Various Artists; Luis Amed Irizarry (album producer) – Cuba y Puerto Rico Son... | |
| 2017 | (Cuba) Jon Secada featuring The Charlie Sepúlveda Big Band | To Beny Moré with Love | Albita – Albita; El Septeto Santiaguero – Raíz; La Colmenita (Various Artists); José Manuel García Suárez (album producer) – El Añejo Jardín; Babalú Quinteto – Cuba Sobre Cuerdas | |
| 2018 | (Dominican Republic) José Alberto El Canario & El Septeto Santiaguero | A Mi Qué - Tributo a los Clásicos Cubanos | Rubén Blades with Roberto Delgado & Orquesta – Medoro Madera; La Sonora Santanera – La Fiesta Continúa; Omara Portuondo – Omara Siempre; María Rivas – Motivos | |
| 2019 | (Colombia) Andrés Cepeda | Andrés Cepeda Big Band (Live) | Olga Cerpa and Mestisay – Vereda Tropical; Yelsy Heredia – Lo Nuestro; Aymée Nuviola – A Journey Through Cuban Music; Septeto Acarey – La Llave Del Son | |
| 2020 | (Cuba) Orquesta Aragón | Ícono | Changüí De Guantánamo – Este es Nuestro Changüí; Ernesto Fernández – Pa'Lante; Orquesta Failde – Failde con Tumbao; Mariaca Semprún – Soy Puro Teatro - Homenaje a La Lupe | |
| 2021 | (Cuba) Alain Pérez, Issac Delgado and Orquesta Aragón | Cha Cha Chá: Homenaje a lo Tradicional | José Aguirre Cali Big Band – Gente con Alma; Chabuco – Chabuco en La Habana; Jon Secada & Gonzalo Rubalcaba – Solos; Leoni Torres – Alma Cubana | |
| 2022 | (Cuba) Gonzalo Rubalcaba and Aymée Nuviola | Gonzalo Rubalcaba y Aymée Nuviola Live in Marciac | Renesito Avich – Café con Cariño; Chabuco – Chabuco Desde el Teatro Colón de Bogotá; Septeto Nacional Ignacio Piñeiro – Gran Combo Pa' Rato; Leoni Torres – Canten | |
| 2023 | (Cuba) Omara Portuondo | Vida | Estrella Acosta – Tierra, Songs By Cuban Women; El Septeto Santiaguero – Y Sigo Pa'lante; Sonora Santanera – Tour Sinfónico En Vivo Auditorio Nacional; Orquesta Failde – Danzoneando (En Vivo Desde Matanzas); Septeto Acarey de Reynier Pérez – En Tiempo de Son... Homenaje a las Canciones de: Jorge Luis Piloto | |
| 2024 | (Dominican Republic) José Alberto "El Canario" | Rodando por el Mundo | Luis Fernando Borjas – Tengo Algo Que Decirte; Alex Cuba – Voces de Mi Familia; Yelsy Heredia – Los Mismos Negros; Yeisy Rojas – A Mis Ancestros | |
| 2025 | (Cuba) Gloria Estefan | Raíces | Malena Burke & Meme Solis – Malena Burke Canta a Meme Solis, Vol. 1; Orquesta Failde – Caminando Piango Piango | |

^{^[I]} Each year is linked to the article about the Latin Grammy Awards held that year.

== See also ==
- Grammy Award for Best Tropical Latin Album
- Latin Grammy Award for Best Contemporary Tropical Album
- Latin Grammy Award for Best Tropical Song
