= Olga y Tony =

Cuban musical duo

Olga y Tony is a Cuban husband and wife musical duo Olga Chorens and Tony Álvarez. In 1951, Olga Chorens co-hosted and co-starred with her husband Tony Álvarez in the popular entertainment show on Televisora CMQ in Cuba. Known as Olga y Tony after the programme name El Show de Olga y Tony, it was a live daily platform with live orchestra made up of renowned artists would take part. All guests performed live with choir accompaniment whenever necessary. Tony and Olga would also perform various songs during the broadcast.

The couple left Cuba in 1963.

They are the parents of the singer Lissette and recording artist and news anchor Olga Alvarez.
