= Rolando Laserie =

Cuban singer and multi-instrumentalist (1923-1998)

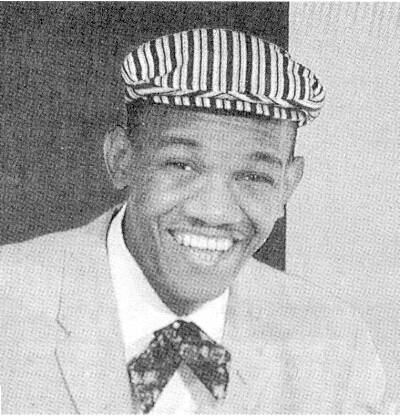

Background information
- Born: August 27, 1923; Santa Clara, Cuba
- Died: November 22, 1998 (aged 75) Coral Gables, Florida, United States
- Occupations: Musician, percussionist
- Years active: 1940s-1998

William Newton Calasanz Rolando Laserie Rodríguez (born August 27, 1923, died November 22, 1998) was a Cuban singer and percussionist. He started his career as a percussionist with bands in his hometown, In 1998, The New York Times and The Washington Post magazine described him as one of the great Cuban singers of all time and as one of the greatest vocalists in Cuban music.

== Biography ==
Rolando Laserie was born in Santa Clara, Cuba. He started his musical career at a young age as a percussionist with musical bands in his hometown. Prior that, he moved to the capital of Cuba, Havana, where he performed with numerous musical groups including Benny More's band, Banda Gigante.

Laserie later transitioned into singing and appeared with Tony Álvarez and Olga Chorens as a singing trio which was assisted by Cuban pianist, Bebo Valdés radio orchestra. In 1960 when Fidel Castro took power, Laserie frequently moved from city to city with his wife, including Mexico, Venezuela, Argentina, New York City and Florida where he would eventually relocate and settle. Laserie became an American citizen, he recorded over 30 studio albums before his death in 1998. He also appeared alongside Israel López Valdés for a reunion concert in 1996

== Death ==
Laserie died of cardiac disease in Healthsouth Doctor's Hospital in Coral Gables, Florida, United States, and was buried at the Miami Memorial Park Cemetery.

== Discography ==
Recordings according to Spotify

=== Albums ===
Recordings in the late 1950s and early 1960s with GEMA Records; recordings with Musart, RCA Vik, Fania and other labels in the late 1970s and 1980s.

- 1977: 2 Ases al Tiro
- 1982: Del Película
- 1998: ¡De Película
- 1998: El Guapachoso
- 1999: Homenaje Al Guapachoso
- 1999: Todo el Tiempo…
- 2000: 15 Exitos, vol.2
- 2004: SaborCanta
- 2007: ¡el Muerto Vivo!
- 2008: Transplante de Corazón
- 2008: Cada Noche un Amor
- 2008: Arrecotin Arrecotan
- 2008: Viejo Rabo Verde
- 2008: El Reloj De Pastora
- 2008: Cuánto Te Quiero
- 2008: Camina Catalina

=== Collaborations with others ===
With Cortijo y su combo and Ismael Rivera

- Danger (Gema Records, in Puerto Rico, 1962; Rumba, in mainland United States, 1966)

With Tito Puente

- Pachanga in New York (Gema Records, 1961)
