= Álvarez Guedes =

Cuban comedian, actor, writer & businessman (1927–2013)

Guillermo Álvarez Guedes (8 June 1927 – 30 July 2013) was a Cuban comedian, actor, writer & businessman. He was better known across Latin America as Álvarez Guedes.

== Early years ==
Alvarez Guedes was born in Unión de Reyes, Matanzas, a town from where, according to a popular song, hails a legendary and probably fictional rumba king called Malanga. His showbiz career began in his hometown. There, since childhood, he would entertain crowds at parties and fairs by dancing and singing.

== Career ==
Guedes moved to Havana, the country's capital and a major entertainment center. In Havana, he worked in theaters and radio shows. But it was in the new medium of television, of which Cuba was the Latin American pioneer, where he made his mark. In a city known for its nightclub scene, Alvarez Guedes appeared in popular television shows that were set in bars and clubs in the role of el borracho, the drunkard, where he mixed linguistic humor with a physical comic style reminiscent of American silent movie stars like Charlie Chaplin and Buster Keaton. He worked in this medium, as well as the booming club world of 1950s Havana, where he shared billing with such stars as Beny Moré, Olga Guillot and Rita Montaner.

During that decade, the comic also began a cinematic career that would lead to roles in more than 14 movies and the production of three. However, his most disseminated medium was the recorded spoken word. In 1960, Alvarez Guedes was forced into exile, landing first in New York City then San Juan, Puerto Rico, where he eventually made his first comedy album in 1973, leading to thirty-plus albums over the years. Through the albums, he became an international star of Spanish-language comedy before settling in Miami.

A Cuban exile, Alvarez Guedes gained fame across Latin America through his stand-up comedy recordings, which deliver jokes in Spanish using Cuban idioms drawn from his country’s street humor.

During the 1970s and 1980s, Álvarez Guedes dedicated himself to recording comedy albums and writing comedy books. He routinely expressed his desire for Cuba to return to the way it used to be; such was the occasion when he made one of his famous jokes, involving a TWA flight he supposedly took between Havana and Miami. That route was actually flown by TWA, Pan Am and Cubana before Fidel Castro's rise to power.

In Guedes' best-selling album How to Defend Yourself from the Cubans, which was released in the mid '80s, Alvarez Guedes routines are spoken in heavily accented English – and incongruously American-accented Spanish. In the album, Alvarez Guedes warns Americans in a tongue-in-cheek manner about the Cuban invasion of United States homeland and culture. The humor works doubly with English and Spanish speakers, the latter recognizing the absurdities of their own culture. It is admitted among Cuban-Americans that Alvarez Guedes could call Cubans on their follies without eliciting any rancor from his countrymen.

In that recording and other stand-up routines, Alvarez Guedes patented the use of the expression ¡ñó! Though it stands for a blunt obscenity, Cubans use the word in both the two-syllable original and the abbreviation as a sign of awe, indignation or even reflection, without ever considering its original meaning. It is the ultimate four-letter word. But given how Cuban speech tends to slur pronunciation, the comedian picked up on its shortened version and it became his trademark.

It is likely that Guillermo Alvarez Guedes broke the vulgarity barrier in Spanish stand-up. But he did not do so transgressively, like a Lenny Bruce, but in the manner of American ethnic comics like the masters of Jewish shtick, as the natural expression of a people. For most of his career, Alvarez Guedes' humor was laced with vulgarity and his audiences laughed accordingly. Yet he never told truly off-color jokes and his comic persona was deadpan and straight, sometimes affecting righteous indignation. He was just talking as would any Cuban.

This was central to his appeal. He played – some would say he was – the cubanazo, a word well known in Miami which roughly means, The Big Cuban. Too Cuban For You. Among Cubans, it was the recognition of one's ethnic idiosyncrasies that enriched his popularity. Among others, it was being granted license to laugh at aspects of Cuban speech and culture which the audience already found funny. As anti-Castro as any of his exile compatriots, Alvarez Guedes summed up his critique of Fidel Castro in a simple vulgarity in Spanish: He was an S.O.B. Most Cuban-Americans would agree.

"My best memories of Cuba make me sad", he told El Nuevo Herald in 2007. "Cuba is a country that no longer exists, even if I was born there".

The roots of Alvarez Guedes' humor are to be found in a Cuban music hall tradition known as teatro bufo, where ethnic types drawn from the Havana barrios acted out comedy skits that were Creole versions of comic theater from the 16th and 17th century Spanish traditions. According to the EnCaribe web page, Alvarez Guedes represented both el gallego (literally "the galician")—– a handlebar-moustached Spanish immigrant, whose physical appearance was that of Alvarez Guedes himself – and el negrito, a street-smart Afro-Cuban who relentlessly mocks el gallego. And his attitude is rooted in choteo, a disregard for any seriousness that Cuban intellectual life identifies as a major component of the island's culture.

Alvarez Guedes, on his radio show on Miami's Clasica 92.3FM, told listeners to make a joke of everything.

Alvarez Guedes wrote more than 20 books, and released numerous albums, television presentations, and stand-up comedy performances over his career.

== GEMA Records ==
Alvarez Guedes and his brother Rafael, together with composer/band leader Ernesto Duarte Brito, founded Gema Records, the company that launched the international careers of "El Gran Combo", a Puerto Rican Salsa music group. A friendship united Guedes with the orchestra's director, Rafael Ithier. The company also launched the careers of Elena Burke and Rolando Laserie, among others.

== Death ==
Alvarez Guedes died on 30 July 2013 at his home in the Kendall neighborhood of Miami.

== Discography ==
- El dia que cayo Fidel Castro (1967)
- Álvarez Guedes 1 (1975)
- Álvarez Guedes 2 (1975)
- Álvarez Guedes 3 (1976)
- Álvarez Guedes 4 (1976)
- Álvarez Guedes 5 (1977)
- Álvarez Guedes 6 (1977)
- Álvarez Guedes 7 (1978)
- Álvarez Guedes en Venezuela (1978)
- 8 (1978)
- Álvarez Guedes 10 (1979)
- Vol 9 (1979)
- Álvarez Guedes 11 (1980)
- Álvarez Guedes 13 (1981)
- Álvarez Guedes 15 (1982)
- Álvarez Guedes 16 (1983)
- 12 (1983)
- 16 (1983)
- Álvarez Guedes 17 (1984)
- Álvarez Guedes 18 (1985)
- 20 (1987)
- Vol 21 (1989)
