= Celeste Mendoza =

- Born: April 6, 1930; Santiago de Cuba, Cuba
- Died: November 22, 1998 (aged 68) Havana, Cuba
- Genre: Salsa
- Occupations: Singer, musician
- Instrument: Singer
- Formerly of: Juana Bacallao

Celeste Mendoza (born Santiago de Cuba 6 April 1930, died Havana 22 November 1998), was a Cuban singer.

== Biography ==
Celeste Mendoza was born in Santiago de Cuba in 1930. She was best known for her singing of guaguancos, the music of the street rumbas, a form of music previously almost exclusively associated with male singers.

She started her professional career as a dancer, appearing at various cabarets, including shows choreographed by "Rodney" Neyras at the Tropicana. In the late 1950s she signed with Gema Records, and made a series of recordings with Bebo Valdés's orchestra. She also recorded with Ernesto Duarte Brito's band. Mendoza toured internationally, and, in 1965, appeared at the Olympia in Paris with the Orquesta Aragón and Los Zafiros as part of the show Gran Music Hall de Cuba. Her career flagged in the late 1960s, but she returned to public attention in the 1980s, performing at festivals and making recordings with the son revival group Sierra Maestra. She went on to record with Los Papines and Clave Y Guaguanco.
