= Radio Mil Diez =

Havana; Cuba
- Frequency: 1010 kHz

Programming
- Language: Spanish

Ownership
- Owner: Popular Socialist Party

History
- First air date: April 1, 1943
- Call sign meaning: CMX, COCX

Radio Mil Diez (or Radio 1010) was a radio station broadcasting from Havana, Cuba, owned by the Popular Socialist Party (PSP). Radio Mil Diez broadcast for five years, between 1943 and 1948, and played an important role in shaping contemporary Cuban music.

== Emergence ==
Following the entry of the Soviet Union in the war against Germany the Cuban communists re-emerged as a legal political party, the PSP. The party purchased Radio Lavín and converted it into Radio Mil Diez in 1943. The first broadcast was made on April 1, 1943. The name reflected the dial sign (1010).

Radio Mil Diez became an important propaganda weapon of the party, and one of the foremost communist media outlets in the Caribbean at the time. The slogans of the radio station were La emisora del pueblo ('The Broadcaster of the People') and Todo lo bueno al servicio del pueblo ('All the Best to Serve the People').

== Frequency ==
Radio Mil Diez had the most powerful shortwave radio transmitter in Havana. It broadcast on the frequency 1010 kHz on longwave, with the call sign CMX. On shortwave it used a 32-metre band and the callsign COCX. It was the sole international broadcaster in Cuba at the time.

== Music ==
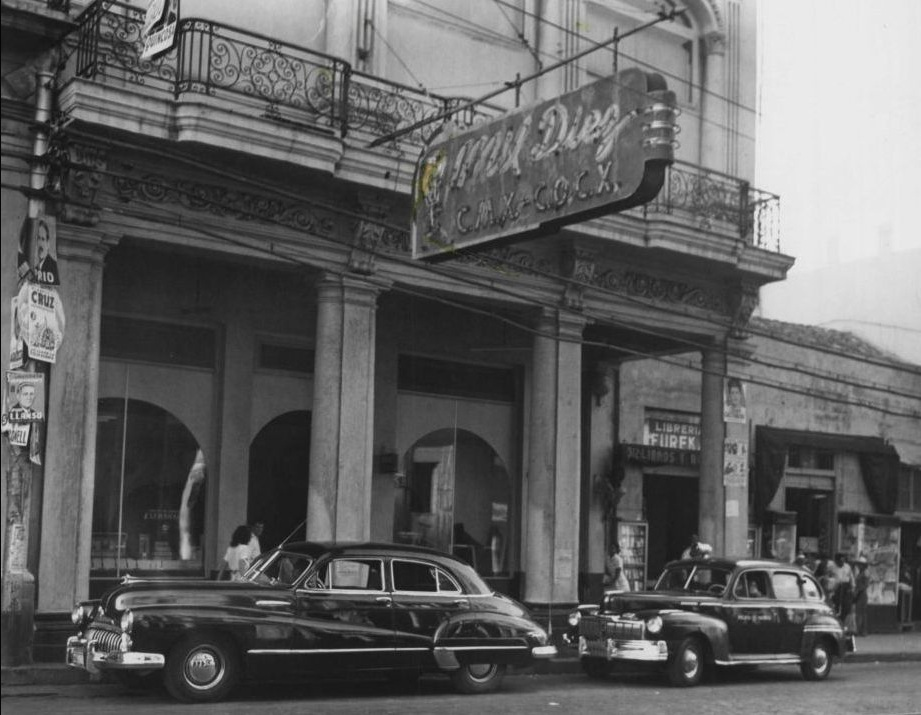
Office of Radio Mil Diez in Havana

The radio station rarely played prerecorded music, preferring to give opportunities for live bands. It played an important role in developing Cuban Jazz. Radio Mil Diez featured several prominent artists and orchestras, such as Beny Moré's Trío Matamoros, Arcaño y sus Maravillas and Arsenio Rodriguez. Enrique González Mantici directed the orchestra of Radio Mil Diez. Celia Cruz featured as a singer of the Radio Diez Mil orchestra, whilst Mongo Santamaría was part of its rhythm section. The radio station sponsored several tours of Cruz, then a young rising singer, across the country.

Adolfo Guzmán was the musical director of Radio Mil Diez. Other musicians that worked at Radio Diez Mil included Elena Burke, Olga Guillot and Bebo Valdés.

Through its cultural profile Radio Mil Diez gained a wide audience amongst the black working class.

== Truce with Trujillo ==
Like the PSP party newspaper Hoy Radio Mil Diez voiced vehement criticisms of the rule of dictator Rafael Trujillo in the neighbouring Dominican Republic (the airwaves of Radio Mil Diez reached the Dominican Republic). The anti-Trujillo propaganda from Havana prompted Trujillo to send Ramón Marrero Aristy as his envoy to negotiate with the Cuban PSP. The Cuban PSP agreed to cease the attacks on Trujillo in Radio Mil Diez, in exchange for allowing its Dominican sister party to operate openly. The deal between Trujillo and the Cuban PSP initiated a short period of political liberalization in the Dominican Republic.

== Closure ==
In May 1948 Radio Mil Diez was closed down by the Ramón Grau government.

== Revolution ==
From January 1959 Radio Mil Diez reappeared and voiced enthusiastic support for the Cuban revolution, whilst remaining close to the PSP party line of reaffirming support for the communist 'old guard' in the labour movement.
