= Los Compadres =

Los Compadres were a famous Cuban trova duo formed by Lorenzo Hierrezuelo in 1947. At the time Lorenzo had a singing duo with María Teresa Vera, and this partnership continued alongside the new venture. His first partner in Los Compadres was Compay Segundo (a famous trova singer and guitarist in his own right), who became the second voice and armónico player of the duo. Later, when Compay Segundo moved on, Lorenzo teamed up with his brother, Rey Caney, keeping the same name for the duo. Both partnerships made many recordings and toured widely in Latin America and the United States.

The Compadres is a latin influenced band formed by Ramon Goose in 2023 in Santiago de Cuba with Juaquin Solorzano who performed for over 20 years in Compay Segundo's band. They have recorded at the legendary EGREM studios in Santiago de Cuba.
