= Quidam Pilgrim =

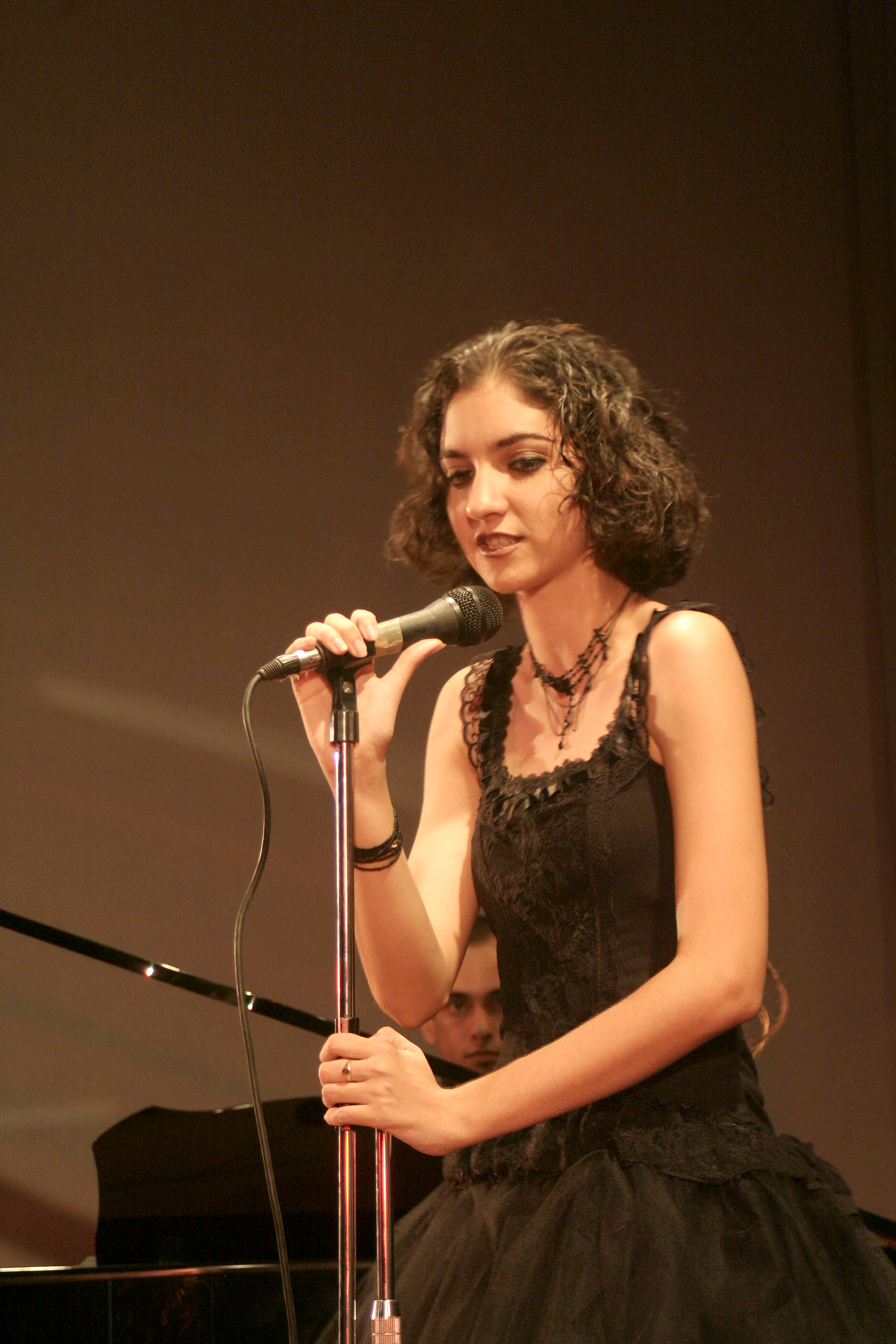
- Quidam Pilgrim performance, 2008.

Background information
- Origin: Santiago de Cuba, Cuba
- Genres: New age, celtic rock, heavy metal, celtic fusion, alternative rock
- Years active: 2005–2012
- Members: Adela Rivas Cruz; Félix Muñiz Penedo
- Website: www.quidampilgrim.com

Quidam Pilgrim is a Cuban musical duet formed in 2005 by vocalist Adela Rivas Cruz (Santiago de Cuba, 1988) and keyboardist Félix Muñiz Penedo (Santiago de Cuba, 1985). Their music fuses elements of Celtic, new-age music, alternative rock and afro-Cuban music frequently making use of harmonised vocal melodies against orchestral backgrounds.

== Band history ==
After almost two years of studio work, Quidam Pilgrim had its debut on the national Cuban television space: "Cuerda Viva" in November 2006 under the name of "Pilgrim".

Two months later they were nominated for the Cuerda Viva Awards in the categories of Best New Artist and Best Alternative Music Demo.

In March 2007, they performed a version of the song Halls of the Interpreter in the national theater of Havana, incorporating new jazz elements and including the interpretation of the violinist and jazz composer Marta Duarte along with the Camerata Vocale Sine Nomine, the event was televised nationwide and their performance re-aired due to audience request.

Same year in July they performed at the third International Festival Caiman Rock in Havana.

Clips of the music have been used several times on radio and TV spots.

== Discography ==
The band's first work has been a musical setting of the classic "The Pilgrim's Progress" by John Bunyan, with each song referring to a scene in the Pilgrim's journey.

1. Walker (the beginning of the pilgrimage to the Celestial City)

2. The Counsel (the encounter with Mr. Worldly Wiseman)

3. Halls of the Interpreter (the visit to the House of the Interpreter )

4. Redemption (the cross and the Sepulchre)

5. The Summit (the climbing of the Hill Difficulty, the path called “Danger" and the road of "Destruction")

6. Palace (House Beautiful atop the Hill Difficulty)

7. Apollyon (the battle against Apollyon in the Valley of Humiliation)

8. Aquelarre (the Valley of the Shadow of Death, visualized as a Witches' Sabbath)

9. Faithful (the encounter with Faithful and Faithful's death)

10. The River (the River of the Water of Life)

11. Delectable Mountains (the Delectable Mountains and the shepherds' guidance)

12. El Rio de los Muertos (referring to the River of Death)

13. Mount Zion (the arrival to the Celestial City)

== Music ==
The music is composed by both Adela and Félix, with lyrics written by Adela. The language in their songs may vary from English, Latin, and occasionally Spanish. The arrangements may include multi-tracking vocals, synthesizers, drums, distorted guitars, afro-Cuban percussion, acoustic guitars, Indian or South American percussion instruments and orchestral backgrounds which were provided by the Esteban Salas Chamber Orchestra. The band's musical influences include Jean Michel Jarre, Pink Floyd, Karl Jenkins, Celtic music, Cuban folk music, Baroque and Renaissance music.

== Critical reception ==
Various critics have pointed to the high artistic value in Quidam Pilgrim's work who have founded it not only uncommon but surprising, pointing that it breaks with many Cuban cultural stereotypes, adding a particular hue of universality in the Cuban music panorama, defining their performances as a dose of daring and virtuosity.
