= Cuban Dance Party =

Studio album by Bebo Valdés and his Orchestra
- Released: 31 August 1959
- Recorded: 1959
- Genre: Chachachá, mambo, afro, jazz, danzón, bolero
- Length: 34:15
- Label: Everest Records

Bebo Valdés and his Orchestra chronology
Los mejores músicos de Cuba (1959)	Cuban Dance Party (1959)	Todo ritmo (1959)

Cuban Dance Party is a 1959 album by Bebo Valdés and his orchestra. It is an entirely instrumental album, including big band renditions of chachachás, mambos, afros, etc. It was released in the United States by Everest Records in stereo, which makes the sound quality particularly good compared to other Cuban albums of the time. It features Humberto Suárez, long-time pianist of the Orquesta Cosmopolita, on organ on two tracks.

Having directed radio and cabaret orchestras for two decades, this was one of the first albums recorded by Bebo with his own jazz-band, known as Orquesta Sabor de Cuba, which featured jazzmen such as saxophonists Edilberto Escrich and Santiago Peñalver. Several of their recordings, including "Ítamo real" and "Sasauma", became hits at the time. However, shortly after the end of the Cuban Revolution in 1960, Bebo left Cuba and went into a long hiatus which lasted until 1994. The album cover makes a reference to the revolution by showing Fidel Castro's patrol cap with a 26 de julio inscription.

== Critical reception ==
Professional ratings
Review scores
Source	Rating
AllMusic	4.0/5 stars
The Billboard	4.0/5 stars

Cuban Dance Party has received generally positive reviews. A contemporary review published in The Billboard praised the sound of the album and its "liveness". Mark Romano of AllMusic called the album "a peek back to a glorious golden era", highlighting the "great arrangements" and the "top form" of the orchestra.

== Track listing ==
No.	Title	Writer(s)	Length
1.	"Babalú"	Margarita Lecuona	2:52
2.	"Chachachá no. 1"	Bebo Valdés	2:38
3.	"El cumbanchero"	René Hernández	2:38
4.	"Habana"	Luis Yáñez	2:46
5.	"A quién engañas"	Bebo Valdés	3:29
6.	"Ítamo real"	Bebo Valdés	2:35
7.	"El manisero"	Moisés Simons	2:38
8.	"Chachachá no. 3"	Bebo Valdés	3:10
9.	"La feria de los siglos"	Rafael Márquez	3:27
10.	"Aquellos ojos verdes"	Nilo Menéndez	3:04
11.	"Sasauma"	Bebo Valdés	2:19
12.	"Tú sabes que te quiero"	Bebo Valdés	2:25
