= Sara González Gómez =

Cuban singer

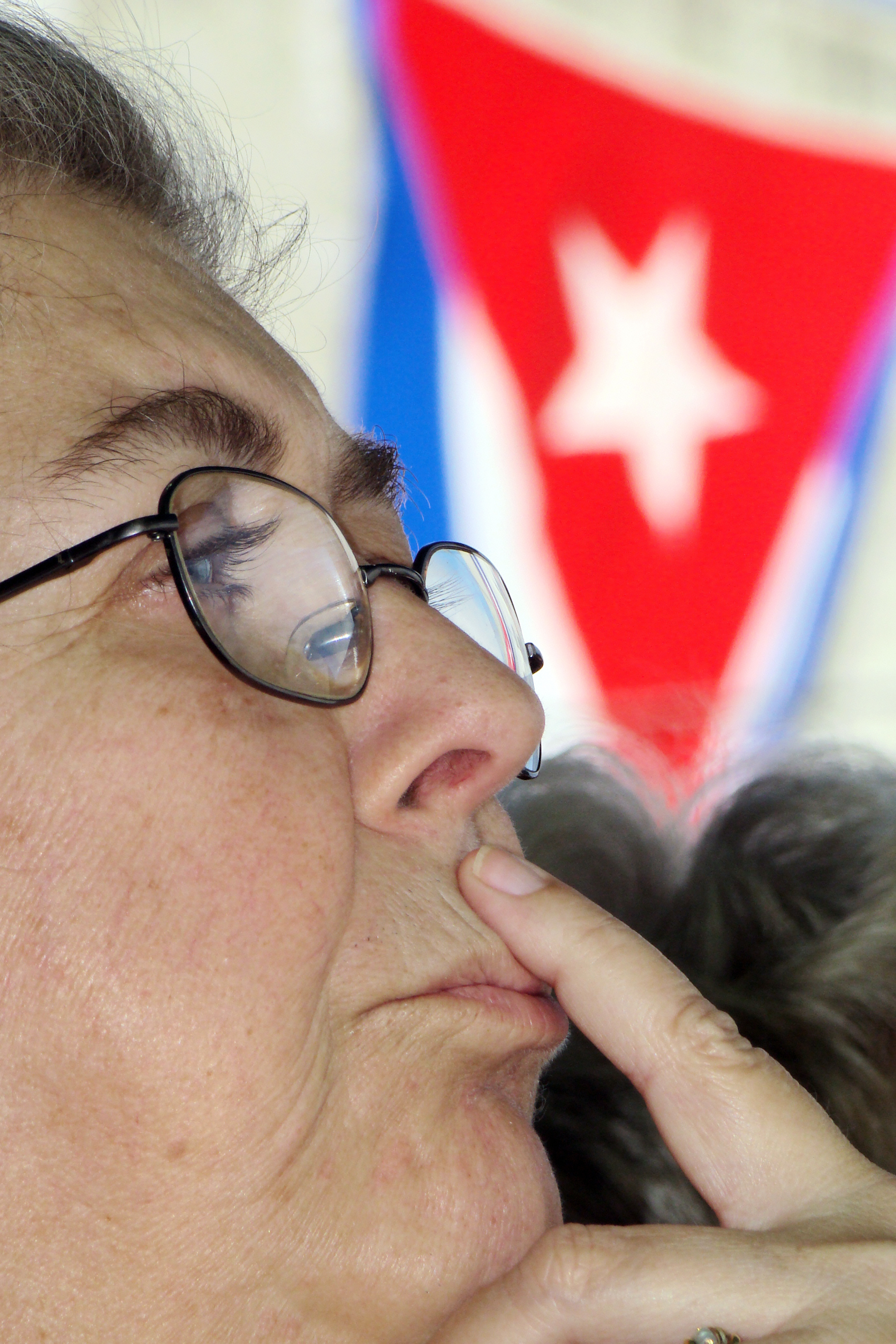

Background information
- Born: Placetas, Las Villas, Cuba
- Occupation: Singer
- Instrument: Voice

Sara González Gómez (Placetas, Cuba; June 13, 1949 or 1951 - La Habana, Cuba; February 1, 2012) was a Cuban singer.

In the 1960s, she studied the viola in the Amadeo Roldán Conservatory. She graduated from the National School of Art Instructors where she also taught guitar and solfège. She was one of the founders of the Nueva Trova Movement and one of its main proponents. She belonged to The Cuban Institute of Cinematographic Art and Industry (ICAIC) Sound Experimentation Group (GES), under the direction of Leo Brouwer, where she studied composition, harmony and orchestration. She produced music for film, television and radio as well as participating in several group albums with other figures from the Nueva Trova Movement and the GES. She was in a relationship with the painter Diana Balboa.

Sara González shared the stage with Silvio Rodríguez, Pablo Milanés, Augusto Blanca, Joan Manuel Serrat, Chico Buarque, Mercedes Sosa, Soledad Bravo, Daniel Viglietti, Pete Seeger, Roy Brown, Pedro Guerra, Beth Carvalho, Liuba María Hevia, Anabell López, Marta Campos, Heidi Igualada, along with several other artists.

In 1973, she composed Girón, la victoria ("Girón, the victory") a tribute to the Bay of Pigs Invasion victory in April 1961. Her discography includes: José Martí's Versos sencillos ("Simple Verses", 1975), Cuatro cosas ("Four Things", 1982), Con un poco de amor ("With a Little of Love", 1987), Con apuros y paciencia ("With Hardships and Patience", 1991), Si yo fuera mayo ("If I Were May", 1996), and Mírame ("Look at Me", 1999).

In December 2006, she attended the Second Iberoamerican Meeting of Languages, in the Villa de Cempoala.
