= Vieja Trova Santiaguera =

La Vieja Trova Santiaguera is a Cuban musical band that formed in 1994 and became successful in Europe. Its members included:

- Reinaldo Hierrezuelo la O (known as Rey Caney), solo voice and lead guitar/tres) (Santiago de Cuba, 30 December 1926 - 23 February 2016)
- Reinaldo Creagh (Cirilo Reinaldo Creagh Veranes, solo voice and claves) (9 July 1918 - 16 November 2014)
- Artistóteles Limonta (Artistóteles Raimundo Limonta, double bass and voice) (Santiago de Cuba, 15 March 1913 - 17 June 2009)
- Pancho Cobas (Francisco Cobas la O, guitar) (Siboney, 1 April 1913)
- Ricardo Ortíz (Ricardo Ortíz Verdecia, solo voice, güiro, trumpet, maracas) (El Cristo (near Santiago de Cuba), 1934 or 1935?)

In the 1997 Dutch documentary "Lágrimas Negras they are shown as true supporters of the Cuban Revolution, bringing homage to the grave of 'Carlos Marx'. As Pancho Cobas explains, before the revolution there was little opportunity to make money (except on Holidays), but after the revolution musicians were asked to form bands and were employed by the state.

Earlier in his career, Rey had replaced Compay Segundo as his brother Lorenzo's partner in the duo Los Compadres. He was also a founder of the Cuarteto Patria, now led by Eliades Ochoa.

== Discography ==
Albums

- Vieja Trova Santiaguera (1994) (NubeNegra/Intuition)
- Gusto y Sabor (1995) (NubeNegra/Intuition)
- Hotel Asturias (1996) (NubeNegra/Intuition)
- La Manigua (1998) (Virgin)
- Domino (2000) (Virgin)
- El Balcón del Adiós (2002) (Virgin)
- Pura Trova (2CD)

Contributing artist

- The Rough Guide to the Music of Cuba (1998) (World Music Network)
