= Alex Sandunga =

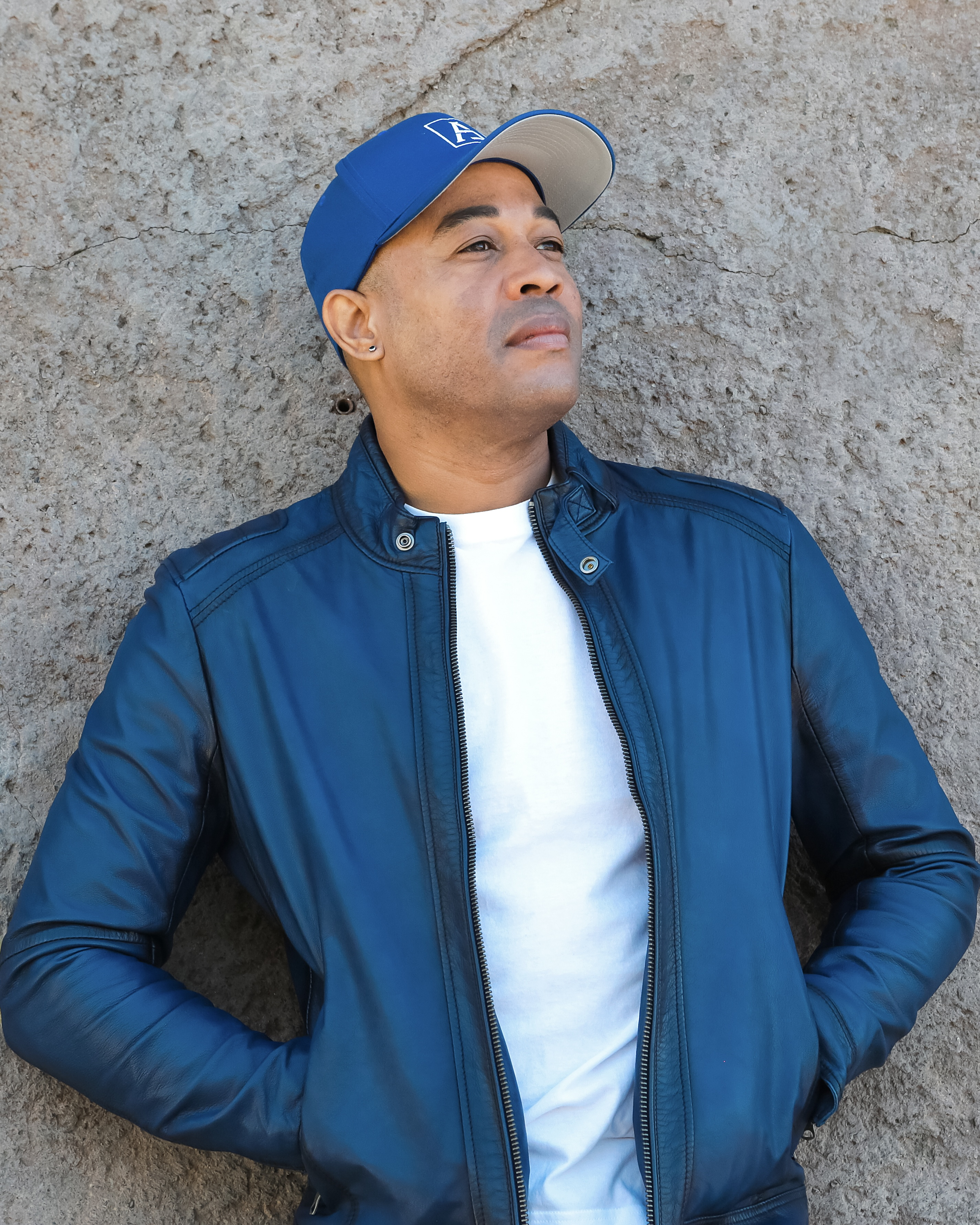
- Alex Sandunga in 2022

Background information
- Also known as: Alex Sandunga
- Born: Alexander Pérez Hernández; November 26, 1976 (age 49)
- Origin: Havana, Cuba
- Genres: Alternative hip hop, Latin rap, Funk, World music, Urban
- Occupations: Rapper, actor, producer
- Instrument: Voice
- Years active: 1997–present
- Labels: Sony, Universal, Fat Belt Record, Blanco y Negro, EGREM, Sandunga Nation
- Website: www.alexsandunga.net

Alex Sandunga (born November 26, 1976) is a Cuban rapper, actor and producer, who is known for his eclectic musical career which is always in experimentation and movement. He is currently living in Helsinki, Finland. In 1997 he founded Alto Voltage NAE, an electric and alive rap group that was known by its strong opinions. He became a member of the Asociación Hermanos Saíz, which supports young artists, i.e. musicians and songwriters. In the association, he became an activist of a hip hop movement and used rather daring lyrics while describing issues such as oppression, racism issues and agony of the people of Cuba.

== Co-operation and touring ==
While touring around Cuba with Alto Voltaje NAE and performing on television as well, Sandunga got connected with more people in the music industry. In 2004, the band made a three-month tour in Finland, which also became the country he settled in during 2005.

During the past years Sandunga, apart from his own music, has been working in co-operation with various kinds of artists, such as the Finnish rapper Mariska. He has visited many festivals (Habana-Hip Hop, Cubadisco, Raumanmeren Juhannus, Koneisto Koneisto, Pori Jazz, Faces Festival, Maailma kylässä, Kontufest, Urb Festival, Sound Dance, Poesía y Rap) in Cuba, Finland, Estonia and Spain (Canary Islands) and shared stages with artists like Mos Def, The Roots and Tony Touch. Sandunga is working on his new album now.

== Discography ==
=== Studio album ===
- 2015: Alex Sandunga
- 2009: Sin Freno

=== EP ===
- 2012: Quiero Quiero

=== Singles ===
- 2009: "A Mi Me Gusta"
- 2011: "Quiero Quiero"
- 2013: "Déjala"
- 2013: "Mundo de Prisa"

=== Collaborations ===
- 2014: "Mi Chica Canela (Marquita)" feat Juno & J. Karjalainen
- 2014: "Gardens" feat Tuigu
- 2014: "Bospor Dilara" feat Tuigu
- 2011: "Ella No Quiere Saber Na" feat Soul Back
- 2010: "Karnaval" feat Orkasmo
- 2006: "Grita Con Migo" feat Mariska
- 2005: "Mucha Carga" feat Gee & Mista
- 2004: "La Pipa De Lague" feat Alto Voltaje
- 2002: "Hasta Cuando Es Esto" feat Miki Flow
- 2001: "Abreme Tu Puerta" feat Payo Malo, Dilema
