= Juana Bacallao =

- Also known as: Juana la cubana
- Born: Neris Amelia Martínez Salazar; 26 May 1925; Havana, Cuba
- Died: 24 February 2024 (aged 98) Havana, Cuba
- Genres: Guaracha, son cubano
- Occupation: Musician
- Instruments: Voice, piano, conga

Juana Bacallao (26 May 1925 – 24 February 2024), also known as Juana la cubana and Juana La Caliente, was a Cuban singer and musician. She started her professional singing career under the aegis of Obdulio Morales, who composed the famous guaracha "Juana Bacallao", which became her stage name.

== Early life ==
Bacallao was born Neris Amelia Martínez Salazar in the working-class neighborhood of Cayo Hueso in Havana. Orphaned at age 6, she was sent to a Catholic boarding school and subsequently worked as a house cleaner until she was discovered by Obodulio Morales, allegedly while she sang as she cleaned a house.

== Career ==
Throughout her career she has toured around the world and performed with such artists as Nat King Cole, Bola de Nieve, Chano Pozo, Beny Moré, Rita Montaner, Los Zafiros and Celeste Mendoza.

In 2011 Bacallao toured the United States and Puerto Rico, and appeared in several Spanish-language television stations.

Bacallao appeared in the September 2015 Cuba episode of the CNN series Anthony Bourdain: Parts Unknown.

== Death ==
Bacallao died on 24 February 2024, at the age of 98.

== Awards ==
In 2020 Bacallao was awarded the Cuban Premio Nacional del Humor (National Humor Prize).
