= El Caney =

- Village

- Location of El Caney in Cuba
- Coordinates: 20°03′21″N 75°46′00″W
- Country: Cuba
- Province: Santiago de Cuba
- Municipality: Santiago de Cuba
- Time zone: UTC-5 (EST)
- Area code: +53-22

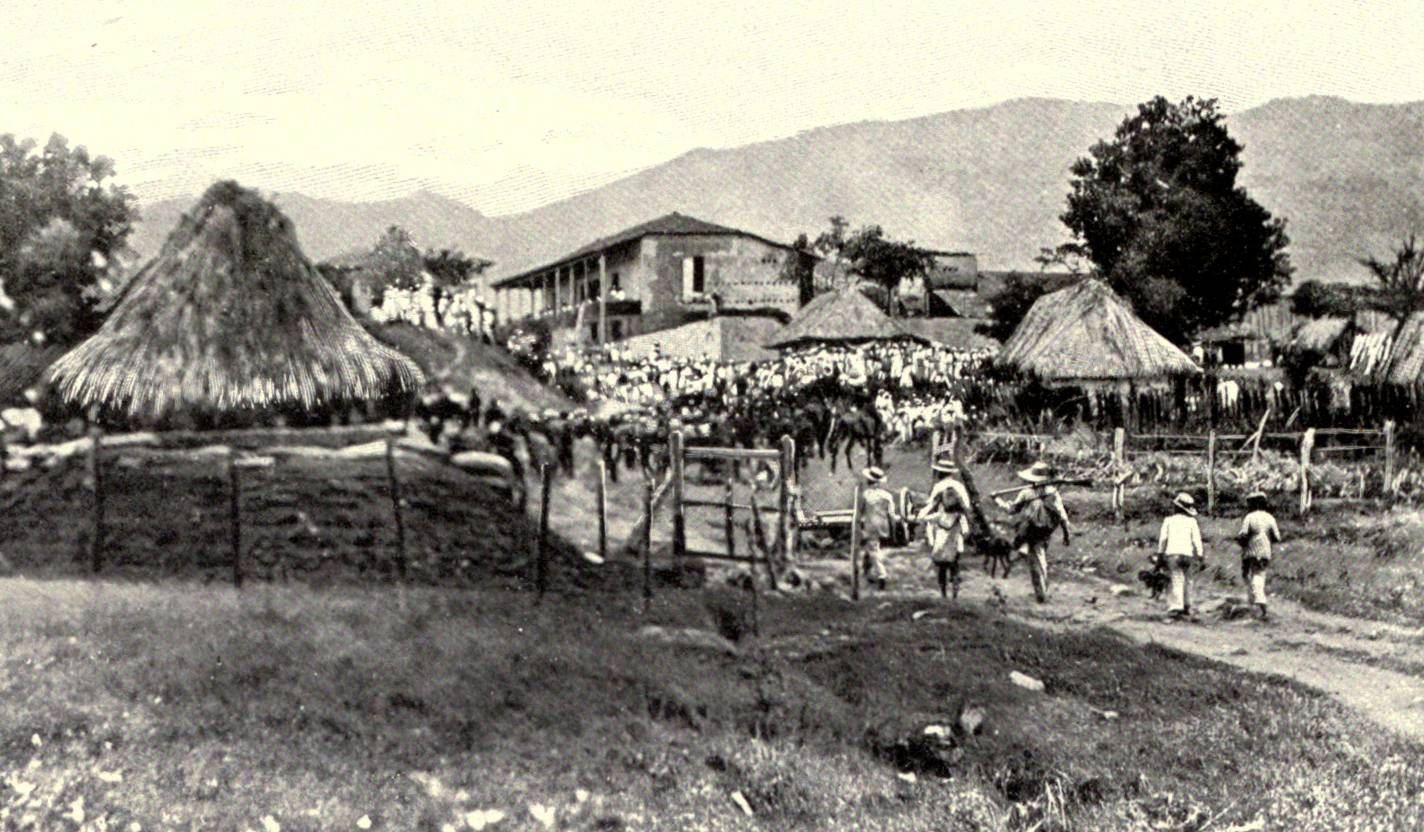
Spanish earthworks and trenches at El Caney, 1899

El Caney (also Caney) is a small village six kilometers (four miles) to the northeast of Santiago, Cuba. "Caney" means longhouse in Taíno.

== Overview ==
It was known in centuries past as the site where Hernán Cortés received a vision supposedly ordering him to Christianize Mexico. The settlement was host to the Battle of El Caney on 1 July 1898.

== Notable people ==
- Manuel Fernández (1871–1921), Spanish general
- Lorenzo Hierrezuelo (1907– 1993), Cuban trova musician

== See also ==
- San Juan Hill
- Siboney
- Daiquirí
- El Cobre
