= Caridad Hierrezuelo =

- Born: 10 August 1924; El Caney
- Died: February 6, 2009 (aged 84); Havana
- Occupation: singer

Caridad Hierrezuelo (10 August 1924 in El Caney – 6 February 2009 in Havana) was a Cuban popular singer. She was the sister of Lorenzo Hierrezuelo and Rey Caney, two famous trova musicians. Her career began in 1947 as a member of the Trio Baraguá, and later the Conjunto Beltrán, until 1950, when she decided to sing as a soloist. She was primarily a singer of the guaracha style, that is, a guarachera.

Caridad toured Peru with Los Van Van, Madrid (at the Sala Clamores). She later moved to Germany, and appeared at Expo 2000 in Hanover.
