= Heradel =

Cuban musician

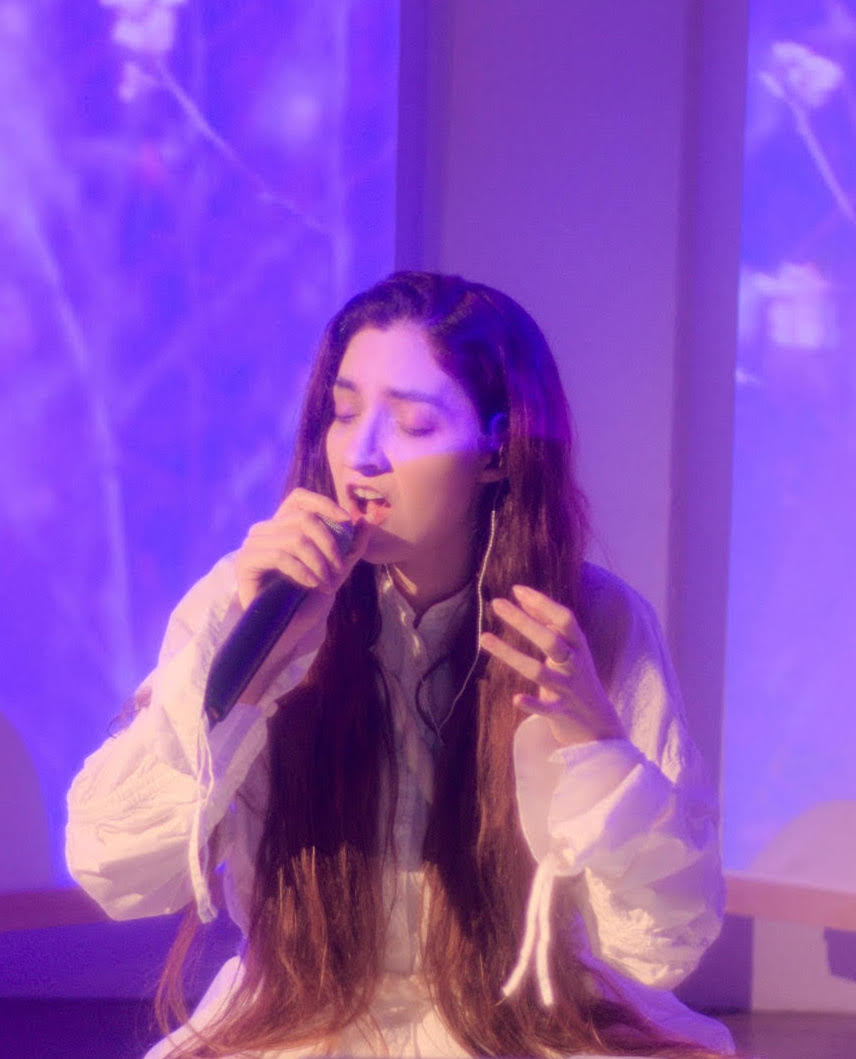
- Heradel performing in Los Angeles, 2021

Background information
- Birth name: Adela Rivas Cruz
- Born: 9 March 1988 (age 37); Santiago de Cuba, Cuba
- Genres: Art pop; ethereal wave; Synth-pop
- Occupations: Singer; songwriter; musician; composer; record producer
- Instruments: Vocals; synthezisers
- Years active: 2003–present
- Website: heradel.com

Adela Rivas Cruz, known professionally as Heradel, is a Cuban singer, songwriter, composer, and record producer. Born and raised in Santiago de Cuba, she is currently based in Los Angeles and has been intermittently making music since 2003 through different projects, debuting as a solo act in 2021.

== Music career ==
At the age of fifteen, while living in Cuba, Heradel begins writing a series of songs inspired by John Bunyan’s The Pilgrim’s Progress, using a guitar and a synthesizer. The following year, she started collaborating with pianist and composer Felix Muñiz, with whom she co-produced the material and co-wrote additional songs, thus forming the musical project Quidam Pilgrim.

The music included layered vocals, synthesizers, drums, guitars, afro-Cuban percussion, South American percussion instruments, and strings, provided by the Esteban Salas Chamber Orchestra.

In 2006, an early version of the album circulated among music enthusiasts through peer-to-peer sharing. Despite not having an official release, the music gained a devoted following throughout the island. The band received radio coverage for years to come, and had several appearances on Cuban national television and award nominations. It received a positive critical reception and was commended for its high artistic value and uniqueness.

At the age of twenty, the singer moves to the United States with her family, entering a period of musical hiatus. She begins working in the fields of film production and art direction for films and music videos, while settling in Los Angeles. She takes up her musical endeavors again in 2020 and starts producing music for audiovisual projects.

In 2021, Heradel debuts as a solo act with a multimedia performance at the Bridge Projects gallery in Los Angeles.

In November 2022, she released "Mother", her debut single, in which she assumes the roles of vocalist, songwriter, arranger, producer, sound designer, and mixing engineer.

== Influences ==
Among her influences, Heradel includes: Liturgical Renaissance music, Paul Lansky, Jean-Michel Jarre, Trent Reznor, Kraftwerk, Aphex Twin, Björk, Enya, Clannad, Karl Jenkins, Dead Can Dance, The Knife and Fever Ray.
