= Nelson Martinez (baritone) =

Cuban operatic baritone (born 1981)

Nelson Martinez is a Cuban operatic baritone. He emigrated to the United States.

Born in Cuba, he graduated from the Superior Institute of the Arts and became the leading baritone with the Teatro Lirico "Rodrigo Prats" in Holguin. Later joining the Teatro Lirico Nacional in Havana, where he performed such roles as Enrico in "Lucia di Lammermoor", Marcelo in "La bohème", Alfio in "Cavalleria rusticana", Tonio in "Pagliacci", Figaro in "Il barbiere di Siviglia", Don Giovanni in "Don Giovanni", and Iago in "Otello". His extended repertoire of Spanish and Cuban Zarzuelas includes: "El Cafetal", "Cecilia Valdes", "Maria la O", "La del Manojo de Rosas", "La Leyenda del Beso", "La del Soto del Parral", and "Luisa Fernanda".

In the year 2000, Nelson Martinez had a memorable success in Mexico with his first musical theater role as Don Quixote in "Man of La Mancha".

He has toured through France, Spain, United States, and Portugal.
