= Lissette =

Cuban musician

- Born: Lissette Álvarez Chorens; 10 March 1947 (age 79); Lima, Peru
- Occupations: Singer, songwriter, record producer
- Spouse: Willy Chirino
- Website: www.lissette.com

Lissette Álvarez Chorens, commonly known as Lissette, (born 10 March 1947) is a singer, songwriter, and record producer from Cuba. She is best known for recording a Spanish language-version of Bonnie Tyler's "Total Eclipse of the Heart" in 1984.

== Early life ==
Lissette was born March 10, 1947, in Lima, Peru, at a time when her parents, Cuban TV stars Olga Chorens and Tony Álvarez (Olga y Tony), were touring South America. While living with her parents in Havana, Cuba, Lissette made her first recording at age 5, the children's song "El Ratoncito Miguel", which would eventually become a hit for her.

She and her sister Olguita were sent to live in Dubuque, Iowa in the United States when she was 14 years old (on September 13, 1961) through Operation Peter Pan.

== Career ==
After two years in the US, Lissette and her sister (both of whom had been separated from each other) were reunited with their parents in Miami and the whole family moved to Puerto Rico in 1965 where she lived until 1979 and where she worked as a singer. In 1977, she was selected by Univision to represent the United States in the sixth edition of the OTI Festival. Her self-penned song, entitled "Si hay amor volverá", placed second with eight points in a tie with "Al nacer cada enero" by Fernando Casado representing the Dominican Republic.

Lissette started her career in Puerto Rico as an adolescent, then later moved to Miami. She hosted her own shows in the Telemundo network in Puerto Rico for several years and did Emmy Award winning TV specials at Channel 10 and Channel 4 in Miami, Florida. Lissette had a successful recording career having more than 30 albums including 8 gold albums and 2 platinum albums. Lissette is an accomplished singer and songwriter who has produced most of her albums. She has received countless awards during her singing career, including a UNICEF award for her humanitarian work with children.

In Latin America, she is known as: "an interpreter of romantic songs influenced by the ballad" (Cuban Music from A to Z, page 12).

== Family ==
She was first married to singer Chucho Avellanet. Together, they hosted El Show de Chucho y Lissette on Telemundo. Lissette is now married to Grammy award-winning singer and songwriter Willy Chirino. They reside in Miami.

== Sources ==
Cuban Music from A to Z. By Helio Orovio. Durham, NC: Duke University Press, 2004. xi, 235 p. ISBN 0-8223-3212-4
