= Plena Libre =

Puerto Rican folk music group

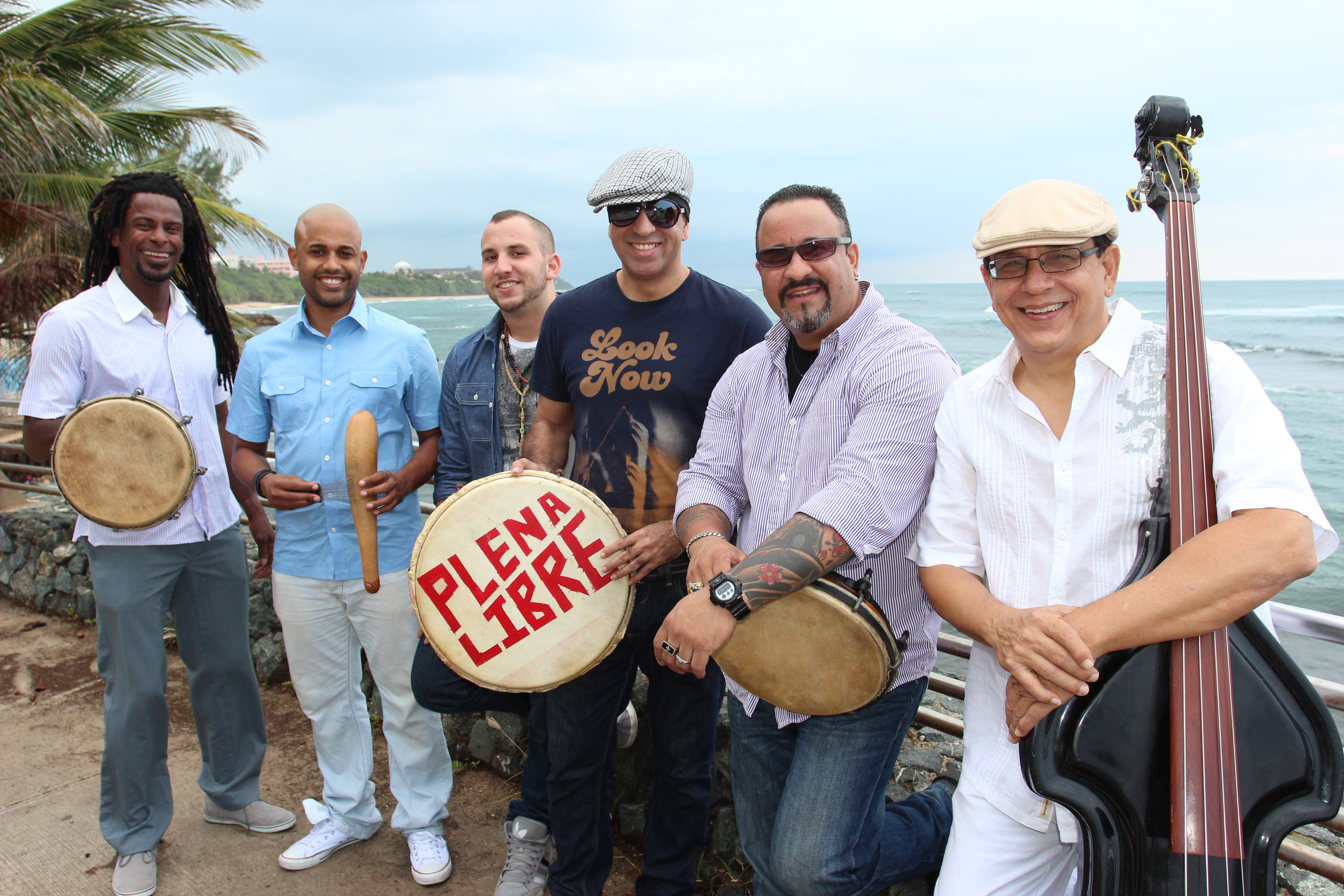

Background information
- Origin: Puerto Rico
- Genres: Plena, Bomba
- Years active: 1994–present
- Labels: Rykodisk
- Website: www.plenalibre.com

Plena Libre is a plena and bomba group. Their music follows traditional forms while also drawing on other styles of music. In a biographical summary of the group, Steve Huey of Allmusic observed that the group's blend of "contemporary dance arrangements... (and) the long-ignored Puerto Rican folklore-derived plena style... return(ed) the style to prominence." A popular live act over the course of a 20-year, 14-album career, the Puerto Rican ensemble are known for strong musicianship; for example, Chris Nickson of Allmusic, in noting the blending of jazz elements with plena on the Mas Libre CD, described the group's delivery of said as "highly accomplished".

Plena Libre have toured internationally, with notable live dates including the Moroccan Fes Festival in 2008, and the Playboy Jazz Festival at the Hollywood Bowl that same year. Regarding their performance at the latter event, the LA Times praised the "sizzling Latin jazz and salsa grooves" that both Plena Libre and another act on the bill, Poncho Sanchez, displayed. September 2013 saw the group play World Music Festival Chicago.

Plena Libre have received multiple Grammy and Latin Grammy nominations. The group received their first Latin Grammy nomination, in the category “Best Tropical Traditional Album”, for their 2001 recording Mas Libre. The nomination represented the first nomination for a Puerto Rican group in the category. In 2003 the recording Mi Ritmo was Grammy and Latin Grammy nominated, again in the “Best Tropical Traditional Album” category. The 2006 Latin Grammys saw an additional nomination for Best Tropical Traditional Album for the group, this time for their recording Evolucion.

Among the notable musicians that have recorded with Plena Libre are master pianist Eddie Palmieri and Nestor Torres.

National Geographic has recognized Plena Libre as one of four Puerto Rican musical acts, along with Ricky Martin, Marc Anthony, and Jennifer Lopez, that are "spearheading the Latin invasion of American popular music".
