= Willy Chirino =

Cuban-American musician

Background information
- Born: Wifredo José Chirino; April 5, 1947 (age 79); Consolación del Sur, Pinar del Río Province, Republic of Cuba
- Genres: Latin; salsa; merengue
- Occupations: Singer; songwriter; musician; record producer
- Years active: 1972–present
- Labels: Sony; Latinum
- Website: www.willychirino.com

Willy Chirino (born April 5, 1947, in Consolación del Sur, Pinar del Río, Cuba) is a Cuban singer, songwriter, musician and record producer.

== Early life ==
Following the communist revolution in Cuba, Chirino came to the United States in 1960 as part of Operation Peter Pan.

== Career ==
Chirino began his artistic career in Miami, releasing his first album in 1974. Since then, he has recorded over 20 albums, several of which have attained platinum and gold status. In 2006, his album Son del Alma, won a Grammy Award for Best Salsa/Merengue Album. As founder of the Willy Chirino Foundation, his philanthropic efforts have been recognized by UNICEF and the Department of State. He celebrated his 35th anniversary in music with his album Willy Chirino Live-35th Anniversary (Willy Chirino En Vivo-35 Aniversario), a CD/DVD combo of the concert. This album brought him his first nomination for 'Best Salsa Album' at the 2007 Latin Grammy Awards. Most recently, Chirino and his wife, singer-songwriter Lissette Álvarez, released their first album together, Amarraditos (Bound to One Another). The CD includes a potpourri of classic Spanish-language love songs. Chirino's album, Pa'lante, was released in early 2008, after which he launched a world tour. In 2011, when asked of how his recordings of My Beatles Heart, he said that Sony scrutinized every single one of his songs and their versions, because they consider the songs by the Beatles as one of their most precious treasures, and wanted to make sure they were being used in a rightful manner.

In 2014, Chirino received a Latin Grammy Lifetime Achievement Award in Las Vegas for his music career.

== Personal life ==
His first marriage was to Olga Maria Rodriguez and they had three daughters: Angie, Olga Maria and Jessica. He later married Lissette Álvarez and had three more children: Nicolle, Alana, and Gianfranco. He has three grandchildren.

== Discography ==
- 1974: One Man Alone
- 1975: Chirino
- 1976: Chirino 3
- 1977: ¿Quién Salvó la Ciudad?
- 1978: Evolución
- 1979: Come into My Music
- 1980: Diferente
- 1981: La Salsa y Yo
- 1982: Chirinísimo
- 1983: Subiendo
- 1985: 14 Éxitos
- 1985: Zarabanda
- 1988: Amándote
- 1989: Lo que Está Pa' Ti
- 1990: Acuarela del Caribe
- 1991: Oxígeno
- 1992: Un Tipo Típico y Sus Éxitos
- 1992: Mis Primeros Éxitos
- 1993: South Beach
- 1994: Oro Salsero: 20 Éxitos
- 1994: Brillantes
- 1995: Asere
- 1996: Antología Tropical
- 1997: Baila Conmigo
- 1997: Oro Salsero: 10 Éxitos Vol. 1
- 1998: Oro Salsero: 10 Éxitos Vol. 2
- 1998: Cuba Libre
- 1999: 20th Anniversary
- 2000: Greatest Hits
- 2000: Soy
- 2001: Afro-Disiac
- 2002: 15 Éxitos
- 2003: Serie Azul Tropical
- 2004: Son del Alma
- 2005: Cubanísimo
- 2005: 20 Éxitos Originales
- 2006: En Vivo: 35° Aniversario
- 2007: Amarraditos
- 2007: Lo Esencial
- 2007: Tesoros de Colección
- 2008: Pa' Lante
- 2008: Grandes Éxitos en Vivo
- 2011: My Beatles Heart
- 2011: Mis Favoritas
- 2012: Llegó la Navidad
- 2013: Soy... I Am: Mis Canciones – My Songs
- 2014: Serie Platino
- 2018: Navidad en Familia
