= Ernesto Duarte Brito =

Cuban musician (1922–1988)

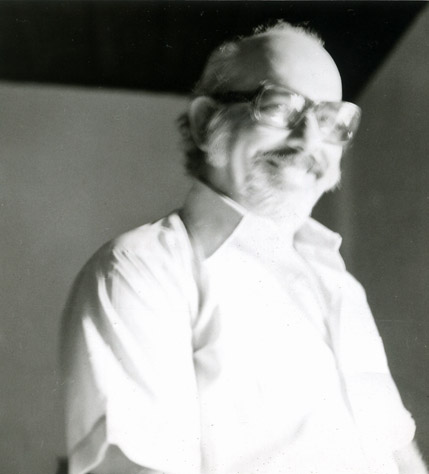
- Born: November 7, 1922; Jovellanos, Cuba
- Died: March 4, 1988 (aged 65); Madrid, Spain
- Occupations: Composer, conductor, music producer

Ernesto Duarte Brito (November 7, 1922 – March 4, 1988) was a Cuban musician born in Jovellanos, author of the bolero Cómo fue, whose performance by Benny Moré became very famous. There are many versions of this bolero all over the world. He was the father of the multi-instrumentalist, composer and arranger Tito Duarte.

== Artistic career ==
He was a composer and producer, conductor and arranger. Among the many songs he composed, the most outstanding are Nicolasa, El baile del pingüino, Bájate de esa nube, Anda dilo ya, Cicuta tibia, Arrímate cariñito, Dónde estabas tú, Qué chiquitico es el mundo, etc. As a producer, he launched to fame, first with the record label "Gema", founded with Guillermo Alvarez Guedes, and later with his own label "Duarte", artists like the afore mentioned Benny Moré, Rolando Laserie, Rolo Martínez, Celeste Mendoza, Tata Ramos, Xiomara Alfaro and Fernando Alvarez. He also worked as an executive at the record company RCA Victor.

He left Cuba in 1961 to settle in Madrid, Spain, where he died on March 4, 1988, at the age of 65.
