= Carlos Manuel Pruneda =

Cuban musician (born 1973)

Carlos Manuel (born 1973) is a Cuban singer, known simply as "Carlos Manuel".

== Career in Cuba ==
Carlos Manuel had been a member of the Mayohuacan, Carapacho and Irakere groups in Cuba, and had had success within Cuba as vocalist with Carlos Manuel y su Clan, which he founded in 1997. In 2001, he was voted the most popular artist in Cuba, Clan decreed the best new band, and his song "Malo Cantidad" the most listened to.

== Personal life ==
In 2003, after performing a concert in Mexico City, Pruneda boarded a plane and flew to Monterrey, Mexico. He boarded a cab and drove to the US border crossing at Brownsville, Texas, where he asked for asylum.
