= El Arte del Sabor =

Studio album by Bebo Valdés Trio
- Released: October 23, 2001
- Recorded: March 13–16, 2000
- Studio: Current Sounds studios, New York City
- Genre: Afro-Cuban jazz, bolero, conga, son cubano, guaracha, danzón
- Length: 63:30
- Label: Blue Note, Lola Records (Spain)
- Producer: Nat Chediak, Julio Martí (exec.)

Bebo Valdés Trio chronology
| Recuerdos de la Habana (2000) | El Arte del Sabor (2001) | Lágrimas negras (2003) |

El Arte del Sabor (literally The Art of Flavor) is a jazz album by the Bebo Valdés Trio released in 2001 by Blue Note Records. It was recorded and mixed in New York's Current Sounds studios during March 2000. The album features Bebo Valdés on piano, Cachao on double bass, and Carlos "Patato" Valdés on congas. In addition, alto saxophonist Paquito D'Rivera appears as a guest artist in three tracks. The album won the 2002 Latin Grammy Award for Best Traditional Tropical Album as well as the Grammy Award for Best Traditional Tropical Latin Album.

== Background and recording ==
El Arte del Sabor is Bebo Valdés' third album in his "second career". After remaining mostly inactive since the 1960s, when he defected from Cuba and settled in Stockholm, Valdés experienced a career revival in 1994 with the recording of Bebo Rides Again, which was followed by Recuerdos de Habana, recorded between 1998 and 2000. For this recording, Valdés worked with two of Cuba's most experienced musicians living in exile: double bassist Israel López, better known as Cachao, and conguero Carlos Valdés, better known as Patato. In addition, alto saxophone and clarinet player Paquito D'Rivera, who had collaborated with Valdés in Bebo Rides Again, played on three tracks as a "special guest".

Like his previous albums, and even more so, this album presented a jazz approach to many Cuban classics from a variety of genres including bolero ("Bolero potpourrí", "Romance en La Habana"), son cubano ("Son de la loma", "El reloj de Pastora"), conga ("Conga potpourrí"), guaracha ("Pare cochero", " Guaracha potpourrí") and afro ("Ogguere"). All the tracks were recorded between March 13 and March 16, 2000 in Current Sounds studios in New York. This was Valdés first collaboration with producer Nat Chediak, who would continue to work with Valdés for the rest of his career.

== Critical reception ==
Professional ratings
Review scores
| Source | Rating |
|---|---|
| AllMusic | 4.0/5 stars |
| All About Jazz | favourable |

El Arte del Sabor has received generally positive reviews. Jazz critic Scott Yanow called the album "a gem", highlighting its "charming melodies, subtle interplay, and wonderful playing". Jim Josselyn writing for All About Jazz described the album as "intellectual enough to satisfy musicians and accessible enough for casual listeners and dancers to enjoy" and praised the musicians as "masters of their instruments and Latin jazz".

=== Awards ===
The album won the 2002 Latin Grammy Award for Best Traditional Tropical Album as well as the Grammy Award for Best Traditional Tropical Latin Album at the 45th Annual Grammy Awards. It was the first of Valdés' three Grammys.

== Track listing ==
| No. | Title | Writer(s) | Length |
|---|---|---|---|
| 1. | "Lamento cubano" | Eliseo Grenet | 3:29 |
| 2. | "Son de la loma" | Miguel Matamoros | 3:24 |
| 3. | "El marañón" | Julio Cueva | 3:13 |
| 4. | "Bolero potpourrí: Se fue / Quizás, quizás, quizás / Aurora" | Marcelino Guerra / Osvaldo Farrés / Manuel Corona | 3:09 |
| 5. | "Priquitín pin pon" | Moisés Simons | 4:25 |
| 6. | "Negro de sociedad" | Arturo Rodríguez-Ojea | 2:15 |
| 7. | "Buche y pluma na' ma'" | Rafael Hernández | 3:59 |
| 8. | "El reloj de Pastora" | Arsenio Rodríguez | 3:50 |
| 9. | "Conga potpourrí: Mírala qué linda viene / Las Bolleras (Adiós mamá) / Los Dandy / La Chambelona / Uno, dos y tres" | anonymous / Gerardo Montes / anonymous / Rigoberto Leyva Matarana / Rafael Ortiz | 3:39 |
| 10. | "Ogguere" | Gilberto Valdés | 6:44 |
| 11. | "Pare cochero" | Marcelino Guerra | 2:14 |
| 12. | "Cumbanchero" | Rafael Hernández | 4:30 |
| 13. | "Si llego a besarte" | Luis Casas Romero | 3:39 |
| 14. | "Guaracha potpourrí: Virgen de Regla / Ay que me vengo cayendo / Para Camagüey se va Panchita / En Manzanillo se baila el son / A la Loma de Belén / Se acabó la choricera / Cabo de la guardia" | Carlos Valdés / Antonio María Romeu / Antonio María Romeu / Emilio Barrero / Guillermo Castillo / Manuel Corona / Tata Alfonso | 3:32 |
| 15. | "Romance en La Habana" | Ray Tico | 4:29 |
| 16. | "Route 66" | Nelson Riddle | 5:02 |
| 17. | "Adiós Panamá / Para Vigo me voy" | Ernesto Lecuona | 1:47 |

== Personnel ==
- Piano, Primary Artist - Bebo Valdes
- Primary Artist - Bebo Valdes Trio
- Upright Bass - Cachao
- Congas, Percussion - Carlos "Patato" Valdes
- Audio Engineer, Mixing - Catherine Miller
- Linear Notes - Dr. Cristobal Diaz Ayala
- Composer - Eliseo Grenet
- Composer - Ernesto Lecuona
- Composer - Guillermo Castillo
- Guest Artist - Israel "Cachao" Lopez
- Photography - J. Socias
- Composer - Julio Cueva
- Executive Producer - Julio Marti
- Composer - Luis Casa Romero
- Composer - Manuel Corona
- Composer - Marcelino Guerra
- Composer - Miguel Matamoros
- Producer - Nat Chediak
- Composer - Nelson Riddle
- Clarinet, Guest Artist, Alto Saxophone - Paquito D'Rivera
- Composer - Rafael Hernandez
- Composer - Ray Tico
- Mastering - Todd A. Gerard
