= Liuba María Hevia =

Cuban singer

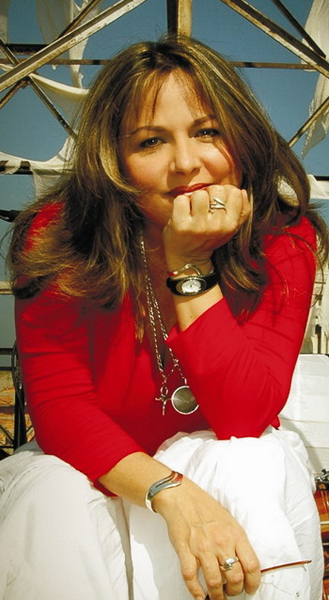
Liuba in 2011.

Liuba María Hevia (born in Havana, Cuba, December 14, 1964) is a singer and composer from Cuba. She has released several CDs, toured internationally, and collaborated with various artists.

Hevia took up the guitar at age 8 and began performing as part of the Cuban musical movement called Nueva Trova (New Cuban Verse) in 1982. She has recorded with Silvio Rodriguez and Pablo Milanes. In the 1990s she gained wider exposure in collaborations with Polito Ibañez, Gema and Pavel, Raul Torres, the duet Cachivache, and the trio En Serie. Her first song recorded was Coloreando la esperanza (Coloring Hope) in 1993. She performs in various styles including guajira, son, danzón, habanera and tango.

== Discography ==
=== Solo albums ===
- Coloreando la esperanza (1993)
- Señor Arcoíris (1995)
- Habaneras en el tiempo (1995)
- Alguien me espera (1996)
- Del verso a la mar (1999)
- Travesía mágica (2002)
- Ilumíname (2002)
- Ángel y habanera (2004)
- ¡Atentos! Traigo un regalo (2005)
- Secretos cantados (2007)
- Puertas (2010)
- Ilumíname en vivo (2010)
- Naranjo en flor (2012)
- Liuba canta a Teresita (2012)
- El mapa de mis canciones (2014)
