= Rey Caney =

Cuban musician (1926–2016)

Reinaldo Hierrezuelo La O (30 December 1926 – 23 February 2016), known professionally as Rey Caney, was a Cuban singer, guitarist, and tresero. Born in Santiago de Cuba as the youngest of 11 siblings, he led Cuarteto Patría for some time; this famous group is now led by Eliades Ochoa. In the mid 1950s, he took over Compay Segundo's place in the duo Los Compadres, as "Duo Los Compadres" they recorded for several record labels including Panart and Seeco, with the latter he also recorded as Rey Caney in New York City in 1960. His partner was his older brother Lorenzo Hierrezuelo, they sang together for thirty years. Caney also sang and played with many other groups, and finally came back to Santiago de Cuba to lead the Vieja Trova Santiaguera, one of the top groups in Cuba's second city. He also worked with his sister Caridad Hierrezuelo, a singer of guaracha style.

His most popular composition is "Caña quemá" (The sugar cane's burning). He recorded two songs with Sonora Matancera, "El que usted conoce no soy yo" and "Quiero emborracharme". Reinaldo Hierrezuelo La O died in Havana in 2016.
