= Lágrimas Negras (album) =

Studio album by Bebo Valdés and Diego el Cigala
- Released: March 10, 2003
- Recorded: September – December 2002
- Studio: Musigrama, Madrid, Spain; Avatar, New York City, US; Hit Factory Criteria, Miami, US; Musiquina, Madrid, Spain
- Genre: Latin jazz, flamenco, bolero
- Length: 39:21
- Label: Calle 54, BMG
- Producer: Fernando Truebam, Javier Limón

Bebo Valdés chronology
| El Arte del Sabor (2002) | Lágrimas Negras (2003) | Juntos Para Siempre (2008) |

Diego «El Cigala» chronology
| Directo en el Teatro Real (2002) | Lágrimas Negras (2003) | Picasso en mis ojos (2005) |

Lágrimas Negras is a 2003 album by Cuban pianist, bandleader, composer and arranger Bebo Valdés and Spanish flamenco singer Diego el Cigala. Lágrimas Negras is a fusion of Cuban rhythms and flamenco vocals, produced by Spanish composer, producer and guitarist Javier Limón and book editor, screenwriter, film director and producer Fernando Trueba and released by Calle 54 Records and BMG Music Spain.

== Background ==
During his career Bebo Valdés (born Ramón Emilio Valdés Amaro; 9 October 1918) —one of the founders of Latin jazz, and a pioneer in bringing Afro-Cuban sacred rhythms to popular dance music— won seven Grammy Awards: two for El Arte del Sabor (2002), one for Lágrimas Negras (Black Tears), and two for Bebo de Cuba in 2006 (in the categories "Best Traditional Tropical Album" and "Best Latin Jazz Album").

His last musical production was one recorded with his son: 2008's Bebo y Chucho Valdés: Juntos para Siempre (Together Forever), winner of the Grammy Award for Best Latin Jazz Album at the 52nd Grammy Awards in 2010; they also won the Latin Grammy Award on the same field.

Valdés spent his last years in Málaga, Spain, before heading back to his home in Stockholm, Sweden, a few weeks before his death. He died in Stockholm on March 22, 2013: he had been suffering from Alzheimer's disease.

== Track listing ==
| # | Title | Length |
|---|---|---|
| 1. | Inolvidable (Unforgettable); Music & Lyrics by: Julio Gutierrez | 3:20 |
| 2. | Veinte Años (Twenty Years); Music & Lyrics by: María Teresa Vera | 4:03 |
| 3. | Lágrimas negras (Black Tears); Music & Lyrics by: Miguel Matamoros | 5:31 |
| 4. | Nieblas del Riachuelo (Stream Fogs); Lyrics by: Enrique Cadícamo & Music by: Juan Carlos Cobián | 3:07 |
| 5. | Corazón Loco (Crazy Heart); Music & Lyrics by: Richard Dannemberg | 3:54 |
| 6. | Se Me Olvidó Que Te Olvidé (I Forgot That I Have Forgotten You); Music & Lyrics by: Lolita De La Colina | 3:15 |
| 7. | Vete de Mí (Get Away From Me); Music & Lyrics by: Homero Expósito, Virgilio Expósito | 2:56 |
| 8. | La Bien Pagá (The Well Rewarded); Lyrics by: Ramón Perelló / Music by: Juan Mostazo | 8:58 |
| 9. | Eu Sei Que Vou Te Amar / Coraçao Vagabundo (I Know I'll Love You / Vagabond Heart); Lyrics by: Vinicius De Moraes Music by: Antonio Carlos Jobim / Music & Lyrics by: Caetano Veloso | 4:19 |

== Personnel ==
- Piano: Bebo Valdés [All Tracks]
- Vocals: Dieguito el Cigala [All Tracks]
- Vocals: Dieguito el Cigala & Caetano Veloso [Track 9]

=== Guest musicians ===
- Bass: Javier Colina [Tracks: 1, 2, 3, 5, 6, 8, & 9]
- Contrabass: Javier Colina [Track 4]
- Cajón: Rickard Valdés [Track 1]
- Cajón: Israel Porrina "Piraña" [Tracks 2, 3, 5, 6 & 8]
- Alto Saxophone: Paquito D'Rivera [Track 3]
- Congas: Tata Güines [Track 3]
- Shekere: Pancho Terry [Track 3]
- Timbales: Changuito [Track 3]
- Violin: Federico Britos [Track 4]
- Guitar: "Niño Josele" (Juan José Heredia) [Track 5]
- Chorus: Milton Cardona, Pedrito Martínez, Orlando "Puntilla" Ríos [Track 8]

=== Production and design ===
Coordinator [Production Coordination In New York]: Derek Kwan, Todd Barkan
Executive Producer: Fernando Trueba, Nat Chediak
Mastered by: Alan Silverman
Photography by: Guillermo Rodriguez
Photography by [Making Of]: Carlos Carcass
Producer: Fernando Trueba, Javier Limón
Recorded by [Additional at Avatar Studios, New York]: Jim Anderson
Recorded by [Additional at Criteria - The Hit Factory, Miami]: Eric Schilling
Recorded by [Additional at Musiquina, Madrid]: Javier Limón
Recorded by [Assistant], Mixed by [Assistant]: Guillaume Cora
Recorded and mixed by Pepe Loeches
