= Cuarteto Patria =

Cuarteto Patria is a musical group from Santiago de Cuba. It was founded in 1939 by Francisco Cobas la O (Pancho Cobas), who served as the Director; along with Emilia Gracia, Rigoberto Hechaverría (Maduro), and Rey Caney (Reinaldo Hierrezuelo la O). The group's original style was traditional trova, which included boleros and some música campesina (countryside music). Over time, both the members and the music evolved, and Eliades Ochoa also became a member of the group.

In 1978, Ochoa was invited by Cobas to lead the group, and he accepted the offer on the condition that he would introduce new musical works into the group's repertoire. Cobas continued with the group while Hilario Cuadras and Amado Machado joined. Ochoa introduced the son as the staple diet of the group and increased the percussion to balance the guajiro content with an African element. He was known for his virtuosity as an acoustic guitarist and his warm singing style. However, it took a long time for the group to gain popularity outside of Cuba. The 1999 documentary film Buena Vista Social Club played a pivotal role in breaking the group internationally. After the film, a series of CD albums were released, in which Ochoa played an increasingly prominent part. This led to increased sales for Cuarteto Patria's albums and many foreign tours for Ochoa and his group.

The group consists of Eliades Ochoa (leader, vocals, guitar); Humberto Ochoa (second guitar, coro); Eglis Ochoa (maracas, güiro, coro); William Calderón (double bass); and Roberto Torres (bongos, conga, coro). Others who have played on some albums include the former leader Franciso Cobas la O (second guitar, coro); Aristóteles Limonta (d. bass, coro); Enrique Ochoa: (second guitar, coro); María Ochoa (voice); Aníbal Avila Pacheco (trumpet, claves); José Ángel Martínez (d. bass); ex-member of Cuarteto Patria, and tresero Rey Cabrera. Famous old-timers who have recorded with the group include Faustino Oramas (El Guayabero), Compay Segundo, and Rey Caney (who led the group for a while in his younger days). The group is now dominated by the Ochoa family, and is expanded for recordings and tours as required.

The group has toured Guadeloupe, Martinique, Granada, Curaçao, Nicaragua, Brazil, Dominican Republic, the United States (Carnegie Hall NY), Canada, Spain, France (Olympia de Paris), the Netherlands, Italy, and Japan. In 2000, their album, Sublime Ilusión, received a Grammy nomination. In 2001, they were awarded the Premio de la música de la Sociedad General de Autores y Editores de España (SGAE) y la Asociación de Intérpretes y Ejecutantes de España (AIE) [the musical prize of the Spanish society of authors, editors and musical performers] for the best album of traditional music.

== Discography ==
Albums

- A una coqueta - 1993 (Corason COCD106)
- The lion is loose - 1995 (Cubason CORA125)
- CubAfrica with Manu Dibango - 1998 (Mélodie 79593.2)
- Sublime Ilusión - 1999 (Virgin DGVIR 85)
- Tribute to the Cuarteto Patria - 2000 (Higher Octave)
- Estoy como nunca - 2002 (Higher Octave)
- A la Casa de la Trova - 2005 (Escondida/Ultra)
- La collección cubana: Eliades Ochoa - 2006 compilation (Nascente NSCD 114).

Contributing artist

- Unwired: Acoustic Music from Around the World - 1999 (World Music Network)
