= Tony Álvarez (Cuban singer) =

Cuban singer

Tony Álvarez (February 25, 1918 – March 19, 2001) was a Cuban singer and television actor and personality in the 1940s and the 1950s. He was born in Havana. Álvarez had started music early and was the host of the Cuban radio musical program Ritmos del Plata. He met Olga Chorens, a Cuban female singer during the broadcast and the duo were a sensation in Cuba known as Olga y Tony and got married. They both played with Orquesta Rió De La Plata.

In 1951, they became co-hosts and co-stars of the popular entertainment show on Televisora CMQ in Cuba. The programme was "El Show de Olga y Tony", a live daily platform with live orchestra made up of renowned artists like Laito Castro on piano, Israel López "Cachao" on bass, Rolando Laserie on percussions. All guests performed live with choir accompaniment whenever necessary. Tony and Olga would also perform various songs during the broadcast.

With the beginning of the Cuban revolution and the arrival of Fidel Castro, the couple went into exile in 1963 and lived in Mexico and later in Miami, New York City and Puerto Rico. He also worked for some time in Spain.

They are the parents of Cuban singer, songwriter, and record producer Lissette Álvarez, and recording artist and news anchor Olga Alvarez.
