= Lorenzo Hierrezuelo =

Cuban trova musician (1907–1993)

- Born: 5 September 1907; El Caney, Cuba
- Died: 1 September 1991 (aged 83); Havana, Cuba
- Other names: Compay primero
- Occupations: Singer, musician, composer
- Relatives: Rey Caney (brother)

Lorenzo Hierrezuelo (Hierrezuelo La O, 5 September 1907 in El Caney – 16 November 1993 in Havana) was a Cuban trova musician, singer, guitarist and composer. He was the son and nephew of soneros, and he grew up in the ambiance of this type of Cuban music and dance. At ten, he was singing in Santiago de Cuba; at thirteen he formed a trio with two friends: the trio eventually left for Havana. They sang in cafés and private houses.

He worked for most of his life in duos with three important Cuban trovadors. When his two friends returned to Oriente, Lorenzo met María Teresa Vera, and formed a duo with her in 1937. Later, with Compay Segundo (Francisco Repilado), he formed the duo Los Compadres; lastly he continued under the same title with his brother, Reinaldo Hierrezuelo, known as Rey Caney. He also had a sister, Caridad Hierrezuelo, who was a singer in the guaracha style. Los Compadres became a successful touring act, singing in most countries of the Americas. Lorenzo and his brother remained based in Cuba for the rest of their lives. Reinaldo became a member of the Vieja Trova Santiaguera.

Lorenzo composed a large number of sones, boleros and guarachas, such as Barbarita tiene novio, Cantando mi son yo me muero, Caña quema, Culpable no soy, El hule de Tomasita, Ese palo tiene jutía, Mal tiempo, Mi son oriental, Rita la caimana, and Sarandonga.

He was a member of the Duet Los Compadres, an internationally renowned Cuban duet alongside Francisco Repilado.
