= Polito Ibañez =

Cuban singer and composer (born 1965)

Polito Ibáñez (born March 29, 1965) is a Cuban singer and composer who is among the generation of contemporary artists in Cuba known as troubadors. He graduated from the Instituto Superior de Arte ingresó and joined the Nueva Trova musical movement in 1985. He won a Premio Cubadisco in 2001 with "Para no Pensar", produced by Spanish producer Jaime Stinus, in the rock music and musical production categories. He has toured in Trinidad and Tobago, Argentina, Venezuela, Spain, France, and the Netherlands with Pablo Milanés, Silvio Rodríguez and Joaquín Sabina.
