= Olga Chorens =

Cuban singer and actress (1924–2023)

- Born: 7 February 1924; Havana, Cuba
- Died: 22 September 2023 (aged 99); Miami, Florida, U.S.
- Occupations: Singer; actress
- Years active: 1941–1951
- Spouse: Tony Álvarez (m. 1945; died 2001)
- Children: 2, including Lissette Álvarez

Olga Chorens (7 February 1924 – 22 September 2023) was a Cuban singer and actress. She started music early as young as 11. She gained huge fame after performing in the Cuban radio musical program Ritmos del Plata hosted by Tony Álvarez. They both played with Orquesta Río de la Plata|Río De La Plata. They eventually married.

== Career ==
In 1951, Chorens co-hosted and co-starred with her husband in the popular entertainment show on Televisora CMQ in Cuba. Known as Olga y Tony after the programme name El Show de Olga y Tony, it was a live daily platform with live orchestra made up of renowned artists would take part. All guests performed live with choir accompaniment whenever necessary. Tony and Olga would also perform various songs during the broadcast.

Chorens also appeared in roles in a number of films, for example in Romance Musical with the contribution of great actor Otto Sirgo and Enriqueta Sierra.

== Personal life and death ==
With the beginning of the Cuban revolution and arrival of Fidel Castro, Chorens and her husband went into exile in 1963 and lived in Mexico and in Isla Verde, Puerto Rico, and later in Miami, New York and Spain. They were the parents of Cuban singer, songwriter, and record producer Lissette Álvarez, and recording artist and news anchor, Olga Alvarez.

Olga Chorens died in Miami on 22 September 2023, at the age of 99.
