= Bebo Valdés =

Cuban pianist, bandleader, composer and arranger (1918–2013)

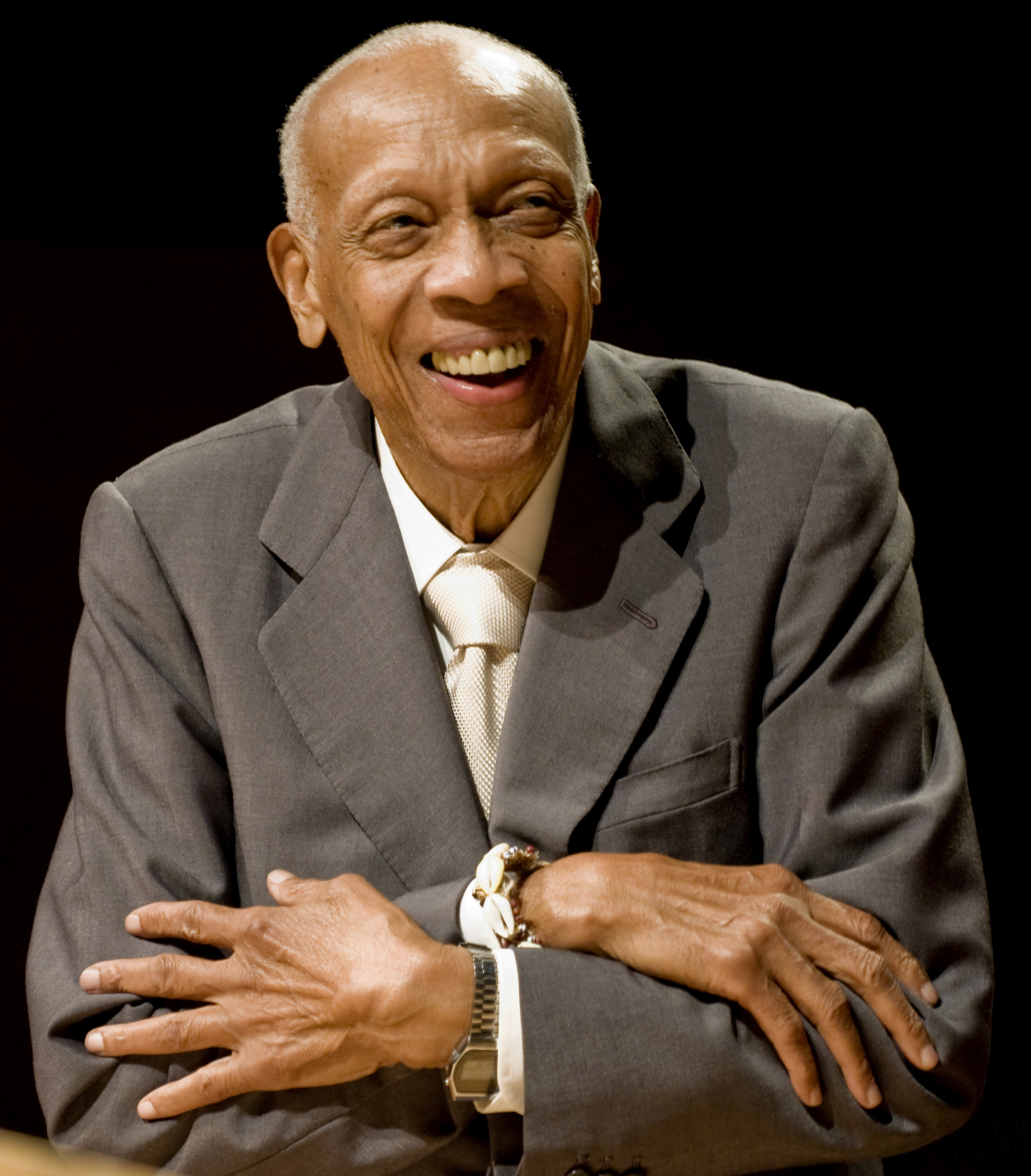
- Valdés in 2008

Background information
- Born: Dionisio Ramón Emilio Valdés Amaro; October 9, 1918; Quivicán, Cuba
- Origin: Havana, Cuba
- Died: March 22, 2013 (aged 94) Stockholm, Sweden
- Genres: Afro-Cuban jazz, batanga, mambo, son cubano, bolero, guaracha
- Occupations: Musician, bandleader, composer, arranger
- Instrument: Piano
- Labels: Mercury, Decca, Panart, Gema, Blue Note, BMG

Dionisio Ramón Emilio Valdés Amaro (October 9, 1918 – March 22, 2013), better known as Bebo Valdés, was a Cuban pianist, bandleader, composer and arranger. He was a central figure in the golden age of Cuban music, especially due to his big band arrangements and compositions of mambo, chachachá and batanga, a genre he created in 1952.

He was the director of the Radio Mil Diez house band and the Tropicana Club orchestra, before forming his own big band, Orquesta Sabor de Cuba, in 1957. However, after the end of the Cuban Revolution, in 1960, Bebo left his family behind and went into exile in Mexico before settling in Sweden, where he remarried. His musical hiatus lasted until 1994, when a collaboration with Paquito D'Rivera brought him back into the music business.

By the time of his death in 2013, he had recorded several new albums, earning multiple Grammy Awards. His son Chucho Valdés is also a successful pianist and bandleader.

== Biography ==
=== Early career ===
Bebo Valdés was born Dionisio Ramón Emilio Valdés Amaro on October 9, 1918, in the village of Quivicán, Cuba, near Havana. He started his career as a pianist in the nightclubs of Havana during the 1940s. He replaced René Hernández as pianist and arranger in Julio Cueva's band. In October 1946 the band recorded "Rareza del siglo", one of Bebo's most famous mambos. From 1948 to 1957 he worked as pianist and arranger for the vedette Rita Montaner, who was the lead act in the Tropicana cabaret. His orchestra and that of Armando Romeu alternated at the Tropicana, backing singers such as Benny Moré and Pío Leyva. Valdés played a role in the adaptation of the mambo into the big band format (it was previously performed by charangas as danzón-mambo) during the late 1940s and 1950s, and developed a new rhythm to compete with Perez Prado's mambo, called batanga. The batanga premiered at the Tropicana in 1952, but could not survive the popularity of another new rhythm, the chachachá created by Enrique Jorrín. Valdés was also an important figure in the incipient Afro-Cuban jazz scene in Havana, taking part in sessions commissioned by American producer Norman Granz during 1952. These sessions yielded the famous improvised piece "Con poco coco" among others, which served as a precedent to Panart's descarga sessions (with one exception). In 1957, Bebo left the Tropicana to establish his own orchestra, named Sabor de Cuba, which recorded with vocalists such as Rolando Laserie, as well as instrumentals. His son, Jesús, later known as Chucho, began his career playing piano in Bebo's band at age sixteen.

In 1958, Bebo took part in the recording of Cole Español by Nat "King" Cole. In 1959, he recorded several descarga sessions with his orchestra for Gema Records, including "Special del Bebo", as well as Cuban Dance Party, an early example of a stereo album recorded by a Cuban ensemble. It featured the standard "Sasauma". In 1960, accompanied by Sabor de Cuba's lead vocalist Rolando Laserie, Bebo defected from Cuba to Mexico. He then lived briefly in the United States before touring Europe, and eventually settled in Stockholm, where he lived until 2007. In Sweden he was instrumental in spreading the techniques of Cuban music and Latin jazz.

=== Career revival ===
Valdés' career got a late career boost in 1994 when he teamed up with saxophone player Paquito D'Rivera to release a CD called Bebo Rides Again. In 2000, the film Calle 54 by Fernando Trueba brought his piano playing to a wide audience. The film showed the first collaboration between Bebo and his old friend Cachao, with whom he had never recorded before. They collaborated again on El Arte del Sabor, which also features Carlos "Patato" Valdés and guest performances by Paquito D'Rivera. In 2003, Bebo and Diego El Cigala, a famous Spanish cantaor (flamenco singer), recorded the album Lágrimas Negras (Black Tears), a fusion of Cuban rhythms and flamenco vocals. In 2004, he was again filmed by Trueba, in El milagro de Candeal in Brazil, and later composed a score for Trueba's 2010 film Chico and Rita, which included bits from his own life. Chico and Rita ends with the dedication "a Bebo".

During his career, Valdés—one of the founders of Latin jazz, and a pioneer in bringing Afro-Cuban sacred rhythms to popular dance music—won seven Grammy Awards: two for El Arte del Sabor (2002), one for Lágrimas Negras, and two for Bebo de Cuba in 2006 (in the categories "Best Traditional Tropical Album" and "Best Latin Jazz Album"). One of his last musical productions was one fittingly recorded with his son: Juntos para siempre (Together Forever 2008), winner of the Grammy Award for Best Latin Jazz Album at the 52nd Grammy Awards in 2010; they also won the Latin Grammy Award on the same field.

In May 2011, Bebo Valdés was awarded an Honorary Doctorate of Music from Berklee College of Music.

== Family and death ==
Valdés was married to Pilar Valdés. This marriage produced five children, one of whom is the pianist Chucho Valdés. In 1963, he stopped in Sweden on a tour with the Lecuona Cuban Boys. There, he met 18-year-old Rose Marie Pehrson, a cavalry officer's daughter. They got married the same year and he settled in Sweden. He described it as the most important moment of his life: "It was like being hit by lightning", he said. "If you meet a woman and you want to change your life you have to choose between love and art". They remained together until her death in 2012.

Valdés was in the middle of treatment for Alzheimer's disease, from which he had suffered for several years, when he died in Stockholm, Sweden, on March 22, 2013, aged 94.

== Discography ==
Data according to Díaz Ayala.

Albums

- 1952: Cubano (Clef) – as Andrés All-Stars
- 1956: Your Musical Holiday in Havana (Decca)
- 1956: Music for the Girlfriend: She Adores the Latin Type (Decca), also issued as Hot Cha Chas (Decca)
- 1958: Selección de estrellas Vols. 1-4 (Discuba)
- 1959: Los mejores músicos de Cuba (Gema)
- 1959: Cuban Dance Party (Everest)
- 1959: Todo ritmo (Panart)
- 1960: Mucho sabor (Bonita), also issued as Este es Bebo Valdés (Venevox)
- 1961: Chachachás y charangas (Decca)
- 1995: Bebo Rides Again (Messidor)
- 1996: Cuba Jazz (TropiJazz) – with Paquito D'Rivera and Chucho Valdés
- 1999: Recuerdos de Habana (Naïve)
- 2001: El Arte del Sabor (Blue Note) – as Bebo Valdés Trio
- 2003: Lágrimas negras (Calle 54) – with Diego el Cigala
- 2003: Blanco y negro (Calle 54) – with Diego el Cigala
- 2003: We Could Make Such Beautiful Music Together (Calle 54) – with Federico Britos
- 2004: Bebo de Cuba (Calle 54)
- 2005: Bebo (Calle 54)
- 2007: Live at the Village Vanguard (Calle 54) – with Javier Colina
- 2008: Juntos para siempre (Sony Music Latin)

With Monna Bell

As director and arranger of the backing orchestra.

- 1961: Nuevos éxitos (Hispavox)
- 1961: III Festival de Benidorm (Hispavox)
- 1962: IV Festival de Benidorm (Hispavox)

With Eladio Reinón

As a guest member of Eladio Reinón's Octet/Big Band.

- 1998: Acere (Fresh Sound)
- 1999: Afro Cuban Jazz Suite Nº1 (Fresh Sound)

Soundtracks

- 2000: Calle 54 (Calle 54)
- 2004: El milagro de Candeal (Calle 54)
- 2011: Chico and Rita (Calle 54)
