= Rosendo Ruiz =

- Born: Rosendo Ruiz Suárez; 1 March 1885; Santiago de Cuba, Oriente, Cuba
- Died: 1 January 1983 (aged 97) Havana, Cuba
- Genres: Trova, canción, bolero, son cubano, guaracha, criolla, bambuco
- Occupations: Musician, songwriter
- Instrument: Guitar
- Years active: 1902–1983

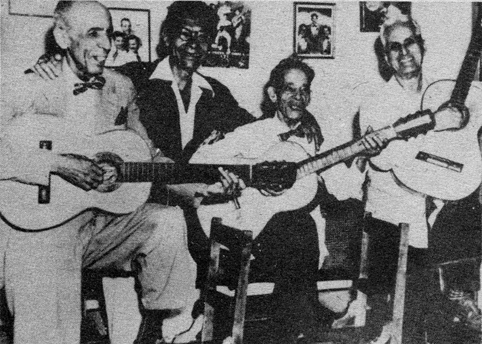
Photograph of the 'Four greats of the trova': Rosendo Ruiz, Manuel Corona, Sindo Garay, Alberto Villalón.

Rosendo Ruiz Suárez (1 March 1885 – 1 January 1983) was a Cuban singer, guitarist and composer, considered one of the founders of the trova. He wrote over 200 songs in a variety of styles ranging from canción and bolero to guajira and bambuco. Although he was a popular performer, founding several successful groups, he made very few recordings. He lived for almost a century, having a great influence on the music of his country.

== Career ==
Rosendo Ruiz Suárez was born in Santiago de Cuba on 1 March 1885. He became a tailor, but soon became interested in music. Like Sindo Garay, Ruiz had a humble background and he taught himself the guitar. Pepe Sánchez gave him lessons to improve his guitar technique and took him into a group of musicians who were brightening up fiestas for wealthy whites in the environs of Santiago de Cuba. Short of money, he moved first to Cienfuegos, then to Havana. His first composition was "Venganza de amor", written in 1902. He later composed "Mares y arenas", with lyrics by Francisco Vélez Alvarado. The song became a success in 1911 when it was premiered by José "Galleguito" Parapar at Havana's Teatro Martí in his first professional performance.

The first recording of a composition by Ruiz was Maria Teresa Vera's and Rafael Zequeira's 1914 rendition of "Tere y Gela". The duo would go on to record many of Ruiz's songs, sometimes accompanied by Manuel Corona on guitar: "Rosina y Virginia" (also known as "Dos lindas rosas"), "Confesión", "Naturaleza", "Encanto de Estela", "Patria y honor", "Violeta", "Mi Cuba bella", "Llanto del corazón" and "Cuba aliada". In 1917 he composed his socialist anthem, "Redención", which premiered on 1 May 1919 (International Workers' Day) at the Teatro Payret in Havana. In 1918, José Castillo and Manuel Luna recorded one of his most famous songs, "Falso juramento". In 1926 he founded the Cuarteto Cuba with Vitaliano Matas (lead guitar), Eusebio Corzo (vocals) and Rafael Ruiz (lead vocals). In 1929 he founded the Trío Habana with Emilio Betancourt and Enrique Hernández, making several recordings for Brunswick Records the same year. In 1929 he was bestowed an honorary award at Seville's Ibero-American Exposition.

In 1932, the Cuarteto Machín recorded in New York City his famous guajira "Junto a un cañaveral", and Julio Cueva's orchestra recorded his pregón "Se va el dulcerito" in Paris. In 1936 he formed the Trío Azul in Havana with Guillermo Rodríguez Fiffe and Enrique Valls, who came as a duo from Santiago. They had a hit with "Bilongo" (also known as "La negra Tomasa"), a composition by Rodríguez Fiffe. In 1937 they recorded a single for Victor: "La comparsa Malaco" / "Solavaya".

He wrote a guitar manual which ran into several editions, and was a president of the Forum de la Trova (1967). His son, Rosendo Ruiz Quevedo, known as Rosendo Ruiz Jr., also became a musician and one of Cuba's most prolific composers. Ruiz died on 1 January 1983 in Havana, Cuba aged 97.
