= Terceto Nano =

- Origin: Havana, Cuba
- Genres: Trova; punto guajiro; guaracha; bolero; canción
- Years active: 1910s
- Labels: Victor
- Past members: Román "Nano" León; Bienvenido León; Tirso Díaz; Domingo Capellejas; Patricio Ballagas

Terceto Nano was a Cuban trova trio founded by singer/songwriter Román León, nicknamed "Nano", and active during the 1910s. It is noted for being one of the earliest groups in the transition from the traditional vocal duet with guitar accompaniment to the vocal trio with one or two guitars. Between 1911 and 1916, the trio recorded 24 songs in Havana for Victor. Such recordings are among the first made a Cuban terceto, and among the first recordings of punto guajiro made by actual trovadores.

The lead vocalist and director of the group was Ramón "Nano" León, who was accompanied by his brother Bienvenido León as second voice and Tirso Díaz on guitar. The group often performed as a quartet, the Cuarteto Nano, with the addition of falsetto singer Domingo Capellejas. Also featured in a subsequent line-up was famed composer Patricio Ballagas, who replaced Tirso Díaz on guitar until his death in 1920. Ballagas composed 6 of the group's recordings for Victor. For Bienvenido, the Cuarteto marked the start of a prolific career, becoming a popular singer in Cuba, Spain and the United States as a member of the Septeto Nacional in the 1920s.

== Recordings ==
- 13 January 1911: "Punto 'La haya'", "La guanábana", "Punto de Nano", "Punto de Corona"
- 17 March 1913: "Anagüererio boncó", "Celina", "Ana", "Los frijoles", "Luz de tus ojos", "A tu rostro" (Note: "A tu rostro" was the only track attributed to Cuarteto Nano.)
- 2 July 1914: "Recuerdos juveniles", "El cocorícamo", "Celia", "El pitiminí", "Punto á Menocal", "Peñalver"
- 18 October 1916: "Tú sola", "Adiós postrer", "A mi guitarra", "Prieta mía", "Idolatrada", "Lo típico de Cuba", "Máximo Herrera", "Los peligros de la Habana"

== See also ==
- Terceto Yoyo
- Trío Matamoros
