= Sandunguera =

Sandunguera may refer to:

- Sandunguera (album), 1986 album by Los Van Van
  - "Por encima del nivel" aka "Sandunguera", 1986 song by Los Van Van
- "Sandunguera" (bolero), 1943 song by Marcelino Guerra recorded by Arsenio Rodríguez and others
- "Sandunguera" (Elena Madera song), 1961
- "Sandunguera" (Guaco song), 1979
- "Sandunguera" (Rafael Muñoz song), 1941 guaracha written by Juan Torres Manzano
- "Chinita sandunguera", 1919 canción by Manuel Corona
- "La mujer sandunguera", 1912 political song by Sindo Garay
- "La negrita sandunguera", 1958 merengue by Bienvenido Fabián recorded by Celia Cruz
- "La sandunguera cubana", 1913 rumba by Alberto Villalón
- "Mulata sandunguera" (Guillermo Anckermann song), 1914 guaracha by Guillermo Anckermann
- "Mulata sandunguera" (Floro Zorrilla song), 1918 canción by Floro Zorrilla
- "Mulata sandunguera" (Juan de la Cruz song), 1940 guaracha by Juan de la Cruz
- La Sandunguera, a 2018 EP by Nathy Peluso

== See also ==
- La Sandunga
