= Marcelino Guerra =

Cuban singer, songwriter and guitarist (1914–1996)

Marcelino Guerra Abreu (26 April 1914 – 30 June 1996), nicknamed "Rapindey", was a Cuban singer, songwriter and guitarist. He spent much of his life in the United States and retired in Spain. As a vocalist, his primary role was segunda voz (harmony singer). He is best remembered for his compositions, which included many guarachas ("Pare cochero", "Me voy pa'l pueblo"), boleros ("Convergencia", "A mi manera") and songs that straddle both genres ("Sandunguera"). He collaborated with lyricists Julio Blanco Leonard and Bienvenido Julián Gutiérrez, as well as his wife, Mercedes Valdés (not to be confused with Merceditas). He made his last recordings in Spain for the record label Nubenegra in the 1990s.

== Life and career ==
Guerra was born in Cienfuegos to an impoverished family, and was orphaned at age five. He was raised by his grandmother, who gave him the nickname Rapindey. In 1931 he moved to Havana, where he sang in Ignacio Piñeiro's Septeto Nacional and took guitar lessons from Rafael Rebuifero. He worked in various groups in Havana through the 1930s, joining Arsenio Rodríguez's conjunto in 1938 and performing frequently on national radio.

He took a trip to New York City to record in 1944, and decided not to return to Cuba. He joined Machito's orchestra soon after, and contributed several original compositions to the group in addition to singing harmony. He worked extensively on the New York Latin scene in the 1950s, including with his own orchestra, before temporarily leaving music in the 1960s to become a merchant marine, working aboard the American-Export Isbrandsten liners, SS Atlantic and later aboard the SS Constitution. In the mid-1970s he was asked by producer René López to return to music, and began recording with such Latin musicians as Rubén Blades and Eddie Palmieri. After this he retired again and moved to Alicante, Spain, where he married Julia Núñez.

He was asked to come out of retirement once more in the 1990s by musicologist Tony Évora. He recorded in 1995 with a host of other Cuban musicians, including Compay Segundo and Omara Portuondo, both of whom would later have their work released under the Buena Vista Social Club umbrella. Guerra's last album, Rapindey, was released in 1996; he died later that year.

Marcelino died in El Campello, a coastal town within the Valencian community in Alicante, Spain, on 30 June 1996, at the age 82 from peritonitis.
