= Rodrigo Prats =

Cuban composer and musician (1909–1980)

- Born: Rodrigo Ricardo Prats Llorens; February 7, 1909; Sagua La Grande, Las Villas, Cuba
- Died: September 5, 1980 (aged 71); La Habana, Cuba
- Occupations: Composer, arranger, violinist, pianist, music director
- Era: Contemporary

Rodrigo Prats Llorens (February 7, 1909 – September 15, 1980) was a Cuban composer, arranger, violinist, pianist and orchestral director.

== Biography ==
The son of a musician, Jaime Prats (1883-1946), Rodrigo began to study music at the age of nine. He studied at first under his father, then under Emilio Reynosa, and finished later at the Conservatorio Orbón.

When only thirteen he played violin in the Cuban Jazz Band, the first band of its type in Cuba, which was directed by his father. At around the same time he joined the Orquesta Sinfónica de la Habana, founded by Gonzalo Roig. Prats' first work as a director of an orchestra was for the theatrical company of Arquímedes Pous; later he fronted many other groups. He was the founder of the radio band Orquesta Sinfónica del Aire, the Orquesta de Cámara del Círculo de Bellas Artes. He was deputy director of the Orquesta Filharmónica de la Habana, musical director of RHC-Cadena Azul, and of Canal 4 de TV. Prats was the founder and director at the Teatro Jorge Anckermann, and the musical director of the Teatro Lírico de La Habana. He joined the faculty of Havana's Studio Sylvia M. Goudie in 1956 after his stint at the Iranzo Conservatory.

His body of work includes popular music, sainetes (short comedies), and zarzuelas. Prats composed Una rosa de Francia, a famous criolla-bolero, at 15, and many other pieces, including Aquella noche, Espero de ti, Creo que te quiero and El tamalero. He wrote the music for sainetes such as El bravo and Soledad, and zarzuelas such as Amalia Batista, El pirata, Guamá, La perla del Caribe and María Belén Chacón. It is probably this work for the Cuban musical theatre for which he is best remembered.

Of these, the song associated with Amalia Batista is perhaps one of the best-known standards of Latin American music, having been recorded by multiple artists around the world.

== Works or publications ==
- Amalia Batista : zarzuela. OCLC 030071049
- Comparsa de la perla del Caribe. OCLC 024412247
- Corazón no llores. OCLC 071292295
- Dolor y amor : bolero. OCLC 019995461
- Los poemas musicales : composiciones liricas. OCLC 032971918
- María Belén Chacón : romanza cubana. OCLC 013549654
- Romanzas y canciones cubanas. OCLC 659107994
- Una rosa de Francia. OCLC 077059583
