= Faustino Oramas =

- Also known as: El Guayabero
- Born: June 4, 1911; Holguín, Cuba
- Died: March 27, 2007 (aged 95) Holguín, Cuba
- Genres: Trova, guaracha, son
- Occupations: Musician, songwriter
- Instruments: Tres, guitar, vocals
- Years active: 1926–2006

Faustino Oramas Osorio (4 June 1911 – 27 March 2007), better known as El Guayabero, was a Cuban trova singer, tres guitarist and composer. Most of his repertoire consisted of sones and guaracha-sones, many with double entendres in the lyrics. His composition "Candela" gained international fame due to its inclusion in the Buena Vista Social Club album.

== Career ==
When he was 15 years old he began playing the maracas as part of a septet of sones known as La Tropical made up by some friends with the purpose of enjoying and performing at the country dances. During the 1940s, he began his career as composer with "Tumbaíto", a song that was included in Libertad Lamarque's repertoire and title he used as an alias for some time. Afterwards, he composed two sones, "Como vengo este año" and "El Guayabero". He composed the latter when he was performing as tres player in the Trovadores Holguineros ensemble. Pacho Alonso, the well-known Cuban musician, first heard the song and then recorded it in a long-playing record that toured across the world. Later on, the Orquesta Original de Manzanillo used the refrain in a tribute to Faustino who, since then, was known as "El Guayabero".

Skillful master of the double meaning, the Cuban's idiosyncrasy, his ingenuity, witty remarks and his love for highly erotic themes amusingly disguised are some of his main features. Unlike most trovadors, Oramas played sones rather than boleros, though this was also true, to some extent, of the famous Trio Matamoros. His preferred instrument was the tres, which is a typical instrument of the son; most other trovadors such as María Teresa Vera or Carlos Puebla played the Spanish guitar. However, his backing groups usually included a Spanish guitar in the basic rhythm.

He composed the song "Candela" of the Buena Vista Social Club (1997) recording, which was a worldwide hit. Wim Wenders directed a documentary film of the musicians involved, Buena Vista Social Club (1999) which was nominated for an Academy Award in 2000.

== Compositions ==
Oramas composed over fifty numbers. He mostly sang his own compositions, which he could perform at any length by adding or subtracting verses. His signature number was "El Guayabero"; other popular numbers included "A María Elena", "Como baila Marieta", "Compositor confundido", "Contigo mi china", "El tumbaíto", "La triguenita", "Las mujeres de Bayamo", "Los abuelos se rebelan", "Mi son retosón". In most of these compositions the rhythm and the poetical structure is rather similar. Four-line verses are interspersed with two or four repeating lines, and the whole or part may be repeated, perhaps several times. The real content comes in the language, which is amusing, human, topical, sometimes vulgar, always entertaining. Rather surprisingly, his work has not been analysed by Cuban writers until recently, although he was well known in the eastern provinces. Indeed, it is difficult to find his name in the various histories of the trovador movement.

== Discography ==
- El Guayabero: sones del humor popular (1982, Siboney LD-224)
- El Guayabero: sones del humor popular (1987, Siboney LD-342)
- El Guayabero (1990, Siboney LD-466)
- El tren de la vida (2006, Eurotropical)
