= Guaracha =

Genre of Cuban popular music, of rapid tempo and with picaresque lyrics

- Stylistic origins: Spanish theatre music; African rhythms
- Cultural origins: Late 18th century, Cuba
- Typical instruments: Tres; Guitar; Piano; Trumpet; Bongos; Claves; Maracas; Voice

Other topics
- Bolero; Contradanza; Afro-Cuban music

The guaracha (Spanish pronunciation: [ɡwaˈɾatʃa]) is a genre of music that originated in Cuba, of rapid tempo and comic or picaresque lyrics. The word has been used in this sense at least since the late 18th and early 19th century. Guarachas were played and sung in musical theatres and in working-class dance salons. They became an integral part of bufo comic theatre in the mid-19th century. During the later 19th and the early 20th century the guaracha was a favourite musical form in the brothels of Havana. The guaracha survives today in the repertoires of some trova musicians, conjuntos and Cuban-style big bands.

The accompaniment of Guaracha was done with the guitar and the tres, sung by traditional Cuban folk singers of songs such as boleros. Guaracha has a more upbeat air to it and a rhythm that is akin to that of tango. For this reason, Guaracha was seen as a more picaresque or satirical expression while the song, on the contrary, as lyrical expression, though it can definitely be defined as song. This means that it does not possess a rhythm of its own and follows the same guidelines of tango. Modern Guaracha starts with an initial lyrical development and then continues with a more traditional formula of an inspirational chorus. The development of this formula, which occurred with Cuban Son as well, brought it closer to Cuban music.

== Early uses of the word ==
Though the word may be historically of Spanish origin, its use in this context pertains strictly to the scope of Cuban music. These are excerpts from reference sources, in date order: A Latin American carol "Convidando está la noche" dates from at least the mid 17th century and both mentions and is a guaracha. It was composed or collected by Juan Garcia de Cespedes (1620–1678) in Puebla, Mexico. This is a typical Spanish guaracha, a musical style that was popular in Caribbean colonies. The lyrics say: "Happily celebrating, some lovely shepherds sing the new style of juguetes for a guaracha. In this guaracha we celebrate while the baby boy is lost in dreams. Play and dance because we have fire in the ice and ice in the fire."

The Gazeta de Barcelona has a number of advertisements for music that mention the guaracha. The earliest mention in this source is #64, dated 11 August 1789, where there is an entry that reads "...otra del Sr. Brito, Portugues: el fandango, la guaracha y seis contradanzas, todo en cifra para guitarra...". A later entry #83, 15 October 1796, refers to a "...guaracha intitulada Tarántula...".

All of these comments make reference to the genre of Guaracha music, but whether they are of the same type is not quite clear. The usage of the word guaracha is rather vast, implying on occasion "to have a good time". A different sense of the word includes "joke" or "to have fun". Other definitions include:

- "Báile de la gentualla casi desusado" (dance for the rabble, somewhat old-fashioned). Leal comments on this: "The bailes de la gentualla are known on other occasions as bailes de cuna where people of different races mix. The guaracha employs the structure soloist–coro, that is to say, verses or passages vary between the chorus and the soloist, improvisation occurs, and references made to daily matters, peppered with crafty witticisms."
- "Una canción popular que se canta a coro... Música u orquesta pobre, compuesta de acordeón o guitarra, güiro, maracas, etc". (a popular song, which is sung alternately (call & response?)... humble music and band &c).
- "Cierto género musical" (a particular genre of music).

== Emergence of the Guaracha ==
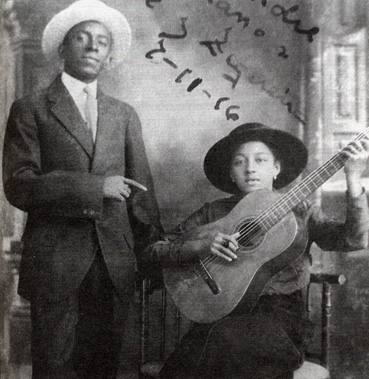
María Teresa Vera & Rafael Zequeira

On January 20, 1801, Buenaventura Pascual Ferrer published a note in a newspaper called "El Regañón de La Habana", in which he refers to certain chants that "run outside there through vulgar voices". Between them he mentioned a "guaracha" named "La Guabina", about which he says: "in the voice of those that sings it, tastes like any thing dirty, indecent or disgusting that you can think about…" At a later time, in an undetermined date, "La Guabina" appears published among the first musical scores printed in Havana at the beginning of the 19th century.

According to the commentaries published in "El Regañón de La Habana", we can conclude that those "guarachas" were very popular within the Havana population at that time, because in the same previously mentioned article the author says: "…but most importantly, what bothers me most is the liberty with which a number of chants are sung throughout the streets and town homes, where innocence is insulted and morals offended… by many individuals, not just of the lowest class, but also by some people that are supposed to be called well educated…". Therefore, we can say that those "guarachas" of a very audacious content, were apparently already sung within a wide social sector of the Havana population.

Buenaventura Pascual Ferrer mentions also that at the beginning of the 19th century up to fifty dance parties were held in Havana every day, where the famous "Guaracha" was sung and danced among other popular pieces.

== Guaracha as a dance ==
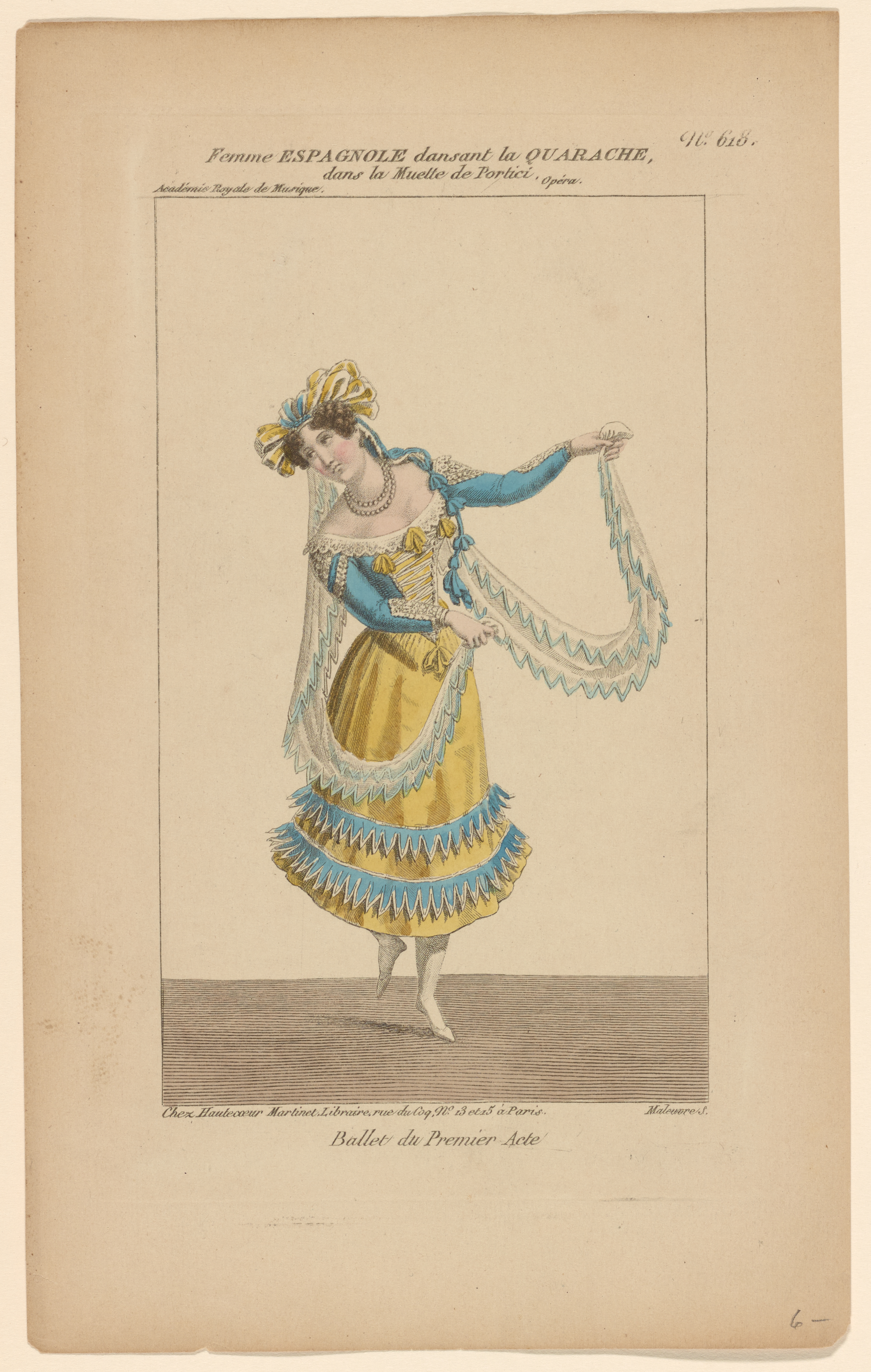
Ballerine dancing « la Quarache » in act 1 of La muette de Portici at the Académie royale de musique (Salle Le Peletier, Paris) in 1828.

There is little evidence as to what style of dance was originally performed to the guaracha in Cuba. Some engravings from the 19th century suggest that it was a dance of independent couples, that is, not a sequence dance such as the contradanza. The prototype independent couples dance was the waltz (early 19th century Vals in Cuba). The first creole dance form in Cuba known for certain to be danced by independent couples was the danzón. If the guaracha is an earlier example, this would be interesting from a dance history point of view.

== Guarachas in bufo theatre ==
During the 19th century, the bufo theatre, with its robust humour, its creolized characters and its guarachas, played a part in the movement for the emancipation of slaves and the independence of Cuba. They played a part in criticising authorities, lampooning public figures and supporting heroic revolutionaries. Satire and humour are significant weapons for a subjugated people.

In 1869 at the Teatro Villanueva in Havana an anti-Spanish bufo was playing, when suddenly some Spanish Voluntarios attacked the theatre, killing some ten or so patrons. The context was that the Ten Years' War had started the previous year, when Carlos Manuel de Céspedes had freed his slaves, and declared Cuban independence. Creole sentiments were running high, and the Colonial government and their rich Spanish traders were reacting. Not for the first or the last time, politics and music were closely intertwined, for musicians had been integrated since before 1800. Bufo theatres were shut down for some years after this tragic event.

In bufos the guaracha would occur at places indicated by the author: guaracheros would enter in coloured shirts, white trousers and boots, handkerchiefs on their heads, the women in white coats, and the group would perform the guaracha. In general the guaracha would involve a dialogue between the tiple, the tenor and the chorus. The best period of the guaracha on stage was early in the 20th century in the Alhambra theatre in Havana, when such composers as Jorge Anckermann, José Marín Varona and Manuel Mauri wrote numbers for the top stage singer Adolfo Colombo. Most of the leading trova musicians wrote guarachas: Pepe Sánchez, Sindo Garay, Manuel Corona, and later Ñico Saquito.

== Lyrics ==
The use of lyrics in theatre music is common, but their use in popular dance music was not common in the 18th and 19th centuries. Only the habanera had sung lyrics, and the guaracha definitely predates the habanera by some decades. Therefore, the guaracha is the first Cuban creole dance music which included singers.

The Havana Diario de la Marina of 1868 says: "The bufo troupe, we think, has an extensive repertory of tasty guarachas, with which to keep its public happy, better than the Italian songs." The lyrics were full of slang, and dwelt on events and people in the news. Rhythmically, guaracha exhibits a series of rhythm combinations, such as 6/8 with 2/4.

Alejo Carpentier quotes a number of guaracha verses that illustrate the style:

Mi marido se murió,
Dios en el cielo lo tiene
y que lo tenga tan tenido
que acá jamás nunca vuelva.

(My husband died,
God in heaven has him;
May he keep him so well
That he never comes back!)

No hay mulata más hermosa.
más pilla y más sandunguera,
ni que tenga en la cadera
más azúcar que mi Rosa.

(There's no mulatta more gorgeous,
more wicked and more spicy,
nor one whose hips have got
more sugar than my Rosa!)

== Guaracha in the 20th century ==
In the mid-20th century the style was taken up by the conjuntos and big bands as a type of up-tempo music. Many of the early trovadores, such as Manuel Corona (who worked in a brothel area of Havana), composed and sung guarachas as a balance for the slower boleros and canciónes. Ñico Saquito was primarily a singer and composer of guarachas. The satirical lyric content also fitted well with the son, and many bands played both genres. Today it seems scarcely to exist as a distinct musical form, except in the hands of trova musicians; in larger groups it has been absorbed into the vast maw of salsa.

Singers who could handle the fast lyrics and were good improvisors were called guaracheros or guaracheras. Celia Cruz was an example, though she, like Miguelito Valdés and Benny Moré, sung almost every type of Cuban lyric well. A better example is Cascarita (Orlando Guerra), who was distinctly less comfortable with boleros, but brilliant with fast numbers. In modern Cuban music so many threads are interwoven that one cannot easily distinguish these older roots. Perhaps in the lyrics of Los Van Van the topicality and sauciness of the old guarachas found new life, though the rhythm would have surprised the old-timers.

Among other composers who have written guarachas is Morton Gould – the piece is found in the third movement of his Latin American Symphonette (Symphonette No. 4) (1940). Later in the 1980s Pedro Luis Ferrer and Virulo (Alejandro García Villalón) sought to renovate the guaracha, devising modern takes on the old themes.

== Guaracha in Puerto Rico ==
During the 19th century, many Bufo Theater Companies arrived in Puerto Rico from Cuba, and they brought with them the guaracha. At a later time the guaracha was adopted in Puerto Rico and became part of the Puerto Rican musical tradition, such as the "Rosarios Cantaos", the Baquiné, the Christmas songs and the Children's songs.

The guaracha is a style of song-dance which is also considered music for the Christmas "Parrandas" and concert popular music. Several modern genres, such as rumba and salsa, are considered to be influenced by the guaracha. The guaracha has been cultivated during the 20th century by Puerto Rican musicians such as Rafael Hernández, Pedro Flores, Bobby Capó, Tite Curet, Rafael Cortijo, Ismael Rivera, Francisco Alvarado, Luigi Teixidor and "El Gran Combo".

Some famous guarachas are Hermoso Bouquet, Pueblo Latino, Borracho no vale, Compay póngase duro, Mujer trigueña, Marinerito and Piel Canela.
