= Jaime Prats =

Cuban musician (1883–1946)

Jaime Prats Estrada (29 March 1883, in Sagua la Grande – 3 January 1946, in Havana) was a Cuban flautist, composer and orchestral director. He also played the clarinet, violin, double bass and piano. He started to study music at seven, and in 1893 went to Cienfuegos, where he continued to study music as well as taking a first degree, graduating at 17.

In 1899 he could be found in Havana playing first flute in the orchestra of the Azzali Opera company, with which he toured several countries of the Americas. On return, he took the post of director of the Municipal band of Sagua la Grande. He graduated from the Conservatorio Peyrellade in 1904, and from 1906 directed orchestras of theatrical companies, touring with them again to Central America. In 1913 he graduated as a doctor of pharmacy. He worked as musical director of the bufo company of Arquímedes Pous when it went to New York City.

In 1922 he founded the Cuban Jazz Band in Havana, one of the first of its type in Cuba. The personnel, all Cubans, included his son Rodrigo Prats on violin, the great flautist/saxophonist Alberto Socarrás, who later emigrated to New York, and Pucho Jiménez on slide trombone. The line-up would probably also have included double bass, kit drum, banjo, and cornet.

His last years were devoted to teaching the history of music at the Iranzo Conservatory, and giving classes on harmony and composition at the Conservatorio Ramona Sicardó. He composed the bolero "Ausencia", and other pieces.
