= Anckermann =

Anckermann is a surname. Notable people with the surname include:

- Carlos Anckermann (1829–1909), Cuban musician, composer, and teacher
- Jorge Anckermann (1877–1941), Cuban pianist, composer, and bandleader, son of Carlos

== See also ==
- Ackermann (disambiguation)
