= Adolfo Colombo =

Canarian-Cuban actor and singer (1868–1953)

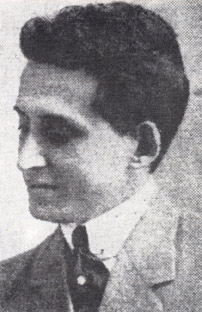
Adolfo Colombo

Adolfo Columbo (Canary Islands, 1868 – Havana 1953) was a leading singer in the Alhambra Theatre in Havana, and also an actor and a leading personality in the theatre. Colombo was the most recorded artist in Cuba up to 1925: records show he recorded about 350 numbers between 1906 and 1917.

Colombo was a tenor, who sang regularly with Claudio García (baritone) in the theatre and on recordings. He also recorded with Regino López and other artists between 1906 and 1929. In 1908 he joined the Cuarteto Villalón with García, Emilio Reinoso (mandolin), and Alberto Villalón (guitar). This was an early precursor of the son groups that developed later in Havana. Their repertoire included boleros and other Cuban genres such as guarachas, a genre which owed its origin to the theatre. One that has been reissued by Harlequin reveals a funky number which is hard to categorize. Listed as a rumba, it is perhaps better described as a guaracha-son. The artists singing are Colombo and Claudio García, the guitar probably Alberto Villalón, plus an unknown musician playing what may be a tres guitar; there is also a clavé. All three named players were white, yet the number is creole, almost Afro-Cuban, in style. Mamá Teresa is still quite well known today in Cuba, and has been recorded by many other groups:

Mamá Teresa se va...
Mamá Teresa se va...
Porque no quiere bailar la rumba
Con Juan que tiene la pata gamba

(Mama Teresa's leaving...
Mama Teresa's leaving...
'Coz she don't wanna dance rumba
With Juan an' his lame foot)

Theatre and theatrical music were hugely important in Cuba in the 19th century and the first half of the 20th century. The zarzuelas (light one-act operettas) and bufos (ribald satirical comedy) both included songs with content about contemporary political and social events. They played a part in the creole movement for the emancipation of slaves and the independence of Cuba. They played a part in criticising governments, lampooning public figures and poking fun at the behaviour of men and women. Most of the recordings Colombo made are now lost, but lyrics have largely survived, and some have been reprinted.

There was a long-standing debate about Colombo's place of birth and origin, which has now been settled by the recent publication of his place of birth as the Canary Islands.
