= Cuban musical theatre =

Cuban musical theatre has its own distinctive style and history. From the 18th century (at least) to modern times, popular theatrical performances included music and often dance as well. Many composers and musicians had their careers launched in the theatres, and many compositions got their first airing on the stage. In addition to staging some European operas and operettas, Cuban composers gradually developed ideas which better suited their creole audience. Characters on stages began to include elements from Cuban life, and the music began to reflect a fusion between African and European contributions.

Recorded music was to be the conduit for Cuban music to reach the world. The most recorded artist in Cuba up to 1925 was a singer at the Alhambra, Adolfo Colombo. Records show he recorded about 350 numbers between 1906 and 1917.

The first theatre in Havana opened in 1775, called the Coliseo, and later the Teatro Principal. The first Cuban-composed opera appeared in 1807. Theatrical music was hugely important in the 19th century and the first half of the 20th century; its significance only began to wane with the change in political and social weather in the second part of the 20th century. Radio, which began in Cuba in 1922, helped the growth of popular music because it provided publicity and a new source of income for the artists.

== Cuban theatre in the early 19th century ==
In 1810, says Alejo Carpentier, a Spanish company arrived in Havana that would perform for more than 22 years. This company had artists of serious merit. The troupe included Andrés Prieto (a famous actor), Manuel García (who played the villain), the singer María del Rosario Sabatini, Antonio Hermosilla and others. After a few months it was reinforced by more Spanish talent: Mariana Galino, Isabel Gamborino (the famous tonadilla singer), and her sister the ballerina Manuela Gamborino, whom Carpentier describes as "an agile and luscious bombshell who had the men of Havana in a spell."

The life of some of these players was theatre itself: Marina Galino provoked her husband to jealousy, whereupon he stabbed her and left her for dead, finally slitting his own wrists. But the lady was not dead, and eventually recovered to give exhibitions of European dance styles, such as the bolero (Spanish style), minuets, gavots polkas, folías (Canary Islands), cachuchas (Andalusian solo song and dance), manchegas (from La Mancha), el pan de xarabe, el caballito jaleado and so on. Many of these were taught at Havana dance academies, but the contradanza and the waltz were the long-lasting favourites. Within twenty years of the contradanza arriving from abroad, it had begun to show signs of cubanization in its rhythm. This was the start of the fusion which eventually effected so much music and life generally in Cuba.

A Cuban actor, Francisco Covarrubias, was a prominent member of the troupe, and figured on its posters. He was a basso buffo, and an author of entremeses (one-act farces), zarzuelas and sainetes. As the vogue for Spanish-style theatre waned, Covarrubias led the way to genuinely Cuban theatrical formats.

== Zarzuela ==
Zarzuela is a small-scale light operetta format. Starting off with imported Spanish content (List of zarzuela composers), it developed into a running commentary on Cuba's social and political events and problems. Zarzuela has the distinction of providing Cuba's first recording artist: the soprano Rosalía 'Chalía' Díaz de Herrera made, outside Cuba, the first recordings by a Cuban artist. She recorded numbers from the zarzuela Cadíz in 1898 on unnumbered Bettini cylinders.

Zarzuela reached its peak in the first half of the 20th century. Musical director Jorge Anckermann produced zarzuelas, reviews and comedies at the Alhambra. A string of front-rank composers such as Gonzalo Roig, Eliseo Grenet, Ernesto Lecuona and Rodrigo Prats produced hits for the Regina and Martí theatres in Havana. Great stars like the vedette Rita Montaner, who could sing, play the piano, dance and act, were the Cuban equivalents of Mistinguett and Josephine Baker in Paris. Some of the best known zarzuelas are La virgen morena (Grenet), Nina Rita (Grenet and Lecuona), María la O, El batey, Rosa la China (all Lecuona); Gonzalo Roig with La Habana de noche; Rodrigo Prats with Amalia Batista and La perla del caribe; and above all, Cecilia Valdés (the musical of the most famous Cuban novel of the 19th century, with music by Roig and script by Prats and Agustín Rodríguez). Artists who were introduced to the public in the lyric theatre include Caridad Suarez, María de los Angeles Santana, Esther Borja and Ignacio Villa, who had such a round, black face that Rita Montaner called him Bola de Nieve ('Snowball').

== Bufo ==
Cuban Bufo theatre is an example of a form of comedy, ribald and satirical, with stock figures imitating types that might be found anywhere in the country. Bufo had its origin around 1800–15 as an older form, tonadilla, began to vanish from Havana. Francisco Covarrubias the 'caricaturist' (1775–1850) was its creator. Gradually, the comic types threw off their European models and became more and more creolized and Cuban. Alongside, the music followed. Argot from slave barracks and poor barrios found its way into lyrics that are those of the guaracha:

Una mulata me ha muerto!
Y no prendan a esa mulata?
Como ha de quedar hombre vivo
si no prendan a quien mata!

La mulata es como el pan;
se debe comer caliente,
que en dejandola enfriar
ni el diablo le mete el diente!

(A mulata's done for me!
What's more, they don't arrest her!
How can any man live
If they don't take this killer?

A mulatta is like fresh bread
You gotta eat it while it's hot
If you leave it till she's cool
Even the devil can't get a bite!)

So the bufo theatre became fertile ground for that typically Cuban musical form, the guaracha.

== Other theatrical forms ==
=== Vaudeville ===
Vernacular theatre of various types often includes music. Formats rather like the British Music Hall, or the American Vaudeville, still occur, where an audience is treated to a pot-pourri of singers, comedians, bands, sketches and speciality acts. Even in cinemas during the silent movies, singers and instrumentalists would appear in the interval, and a pianist would play during the films. Bola de Nieve and María Teresa Vera are two stars who played in cinemas in their early days. Burlesque was also common in Havana before 1960.

=== African 'theatre' ===
All the African cultures which were brought to Cuba had traditions, which survive erratically to the present day, not always in detail, but in general style. The best preserved are the African polytheistic religions, where, in Cuba at least, the instruments, the language, the chants, the dances and their interpretations are quite well preserved.

Not until after the Second World War do we find detailed printed descriptions or recordings of African sacred ceremonies in Cuba. Inside the cults, music, song, dance and ceremony were (and still are) learnt by heart by means of demonstration, including such ceremonial procedures as are conducted in an African language. The experiences were (and some still are) private to the initiated, until the work of the ethnologist Fernándo Ortíz, who devoted a large part of his life to investigating the influence of African culture in Cuba. The first detailed transcription of percussion, song and chants are to be found in his great works.
