= Alberto Villalón =

Cuban musician in the trova style (1882–1955)

Alberto Villalón Morales (7 June 1882 in Santiago de Cuba – 16 July 1955 in Havana) was one of the greatest musicians in the Cuban trova style.

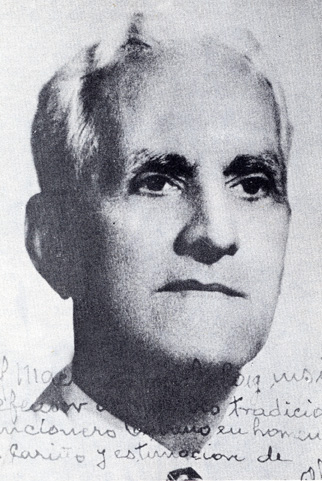
Alberto Villalón

He was the only one of the 'four greats' of the trova to come from a well-to-do family. Villalón and his sister América studied guitar with Pepe Sánchez, the father of the trova movement. Later, he studied classical guitar to achieve a really excellent technique. He composed his first canciones and boleros at fourteen, and moved to Havana in 1900. In 1907 he recorded on Edison cylinders. In 1908 he formed the Cuarteto Villalón with Adolfo Colombo (tenor), Claudio García (baritone), Emilio Reinoso (mandolin), and Alberto Villalón (guitar). Colombo and García were regular members of the Teatro Alhambra company; Colombo was the most recorded singer of the age.

A difference between Villalón and the other early trovadors was in his guitar technique. With his training he preferred picking (punteado) instead of strumming (rasgueado), which had been the main technique previously. This gave him a wider range of harmonic possibilities and a characteristic style. He had a second career in 1927 when he became a founding member of the Septeto Nacional de Ignacio Piñeiro. Alberto brought into the septet Juan de la Cruz and Benvenido León, who had been playing with him in a trio. The addition of the first really great sonero, Abelardo Barroso (1905 – 1972), made the Nacional the best group in Cuba for its time.

Villalón's career, then, connected the world of trova with the world of son which became central to Cuba's popular music for the rest of the century.
