= Suavecito =

Suavecito may refer to:

- "Suavecito" (1929 song), written by Ignacio Piñeiro
- "Suavecito" (Malo song), released in 1972
- "Suavecito", a song by Laura León

== See also ==
- Suave (disambiguation)
