= Querida =

Querida may refer to:

- Carmen Querida, Venezuelan telenovela on Radio Caracas Televisión
- Querida, Colorado, ghost town in Custer County, Colorado, United States
- Querida Enemiga, a telenovela distributed by Televisa
- "Querida", a song by Juan Gabriel from Recuerdos, Vol. II

== See also ==
- "Asturias, patria querida", the anthem of the Spanish autonomous community of Asturias
- Mi querida señorita, a 1972 Spanish film directed by Jaime de Armiñán; a black comedy on the subject of sex change
