= Sandunguera (bolero) =

Single by Arsenio Rodríguez
- A-side: "Sin tu querer"
- Released: 1943
- Recorded: 14 September 1943
- Genre: Bolero, guaracha
- Length: 3:01
- Label: RCA Victor
- Songwriter(s): Marcelino Guerra, Luis Piedra

Arsenio Rodríguez singles chronology
| "Con un solo pie" (1942) | "Sandunguera" (1943) | "Triste lucha" (1943) |

"Sandunguera" is a bolero written by Marcelino Guerra and Luis Piedra for Arsenio Rodríguez in 1943. Arsenio's version, however, was arranged as an uptempo guaracha and released as the B-side of Pablo Cairo's "Sin tu querer" by RCA Victor. The song has since been covered by multiple artists, including Marcelino Guerra himself, and has been called a "classic track" and an important recording in the development of Arsenio's career.

== Background and recording ==
At the time of the recording, Arsenio's conjunto was beginning to make recordings, with a rather variable lineup. With the incorporation of Lilí Martínez (1945) and later Félix Chappottín (1950), the conjunto reached its peak of success and maturity. However, records such as "Sandunguera" have been highlighted as early examples of Arsenio's trademark syle of interlocking rhythms and sudden tempo changes. Describing the original recording, Ned Sublette emphasized how the pianist, Adolfo "Panacea" O'Reilly, "drops into bell-like quarter-note octaves on the piano to lock in with the cowbell". He goes on to define the song as a thrilling "new sound", which paved the way for classic recordings such as "Deuda" and "El reloj de Pastora".

The lyrics of the song extol the beauty of a mulata, a black woman, often called sandunguera in Cuba, the adjetival form of sandunga (grace, charm). Thus, although not his own composition, the song is considered an example of Arsenio's African-inspired repertory which alludes to his own heritage.

== Cover versions ==
"Sandunguera" has been covered multiple times, often as a bolero, and sometimes as a guaracha reminiscent of Arsenio's original. It was recorded by the Puerto Rican ensemble Sexteto Borinquen in their 1963 album Sexteto Borinquen Vol. 2, released by Ansonia, and by La Playa Sextet in their 1965 album La Playa in Puerto Rico, released by United Artists. Another Puerto Rican band, Orquesta Corporación Latina, recorded a salsa arrangement with a guaguancó rhythm in 1983. It has also been recorded by salsa singer Oscar D'León (1978), son cubano vocalist Miguel Quintana (1986) and Marcelino Guerra himself (1996), who did so in Spain for the record label Nubenegra. Another recording was made by Los Naranjos in 1998 under the title "Sandunguera mujer".

== Personnel ==
- Arsenio Rodríguez – leader, tres
- Pedro Luis Sarracent – lead vocals, claves
- Miguelito Cuní – lead vocals, maracas
- Rubén Calzado – first trumpet, arranger
- Benetín Bustillo – second trumpet
- Adolfo "Panacea" O'Reilly – piano
- Nilo Alfonso – double bass
- Enrique "Kike" Rodríguez – tumbadora
- Antolín "Papa Kila" Suárez – bongó

== See also ==
- Arsenio Rodríguez discography
