= Chicho Ibáñez =

Cuban musician

Chicho Ibáñez, born José Ibáñez Noriega (Corral Falso, 22 November 1875 – Havana, 18 May 1981), was the longest-lived and one of the most important members of the Cuban trova. He was significant because, unlike most of the others, he specialized in Afro-Cuban genres. He was a disciple of the tresero Eduardo Fusté, and a member of early groups in Cárdenas, such as Peonia and that of Benito Tumborombo. Later he moved to Havana, where he joined Los Veintiuno, directed by Alejandro Sotolongo, which used claves, maracas, marimbula, bongó and pianito (a wooden instrument with hemp cords). He worked in other groups, and in the Sans-Souci, formerly the leading cabaret in Havana.

Ibáñez was the first trovador that we know of to specialize in the son and also on guaguancós and afrocuban rhythms from the abakuá. He played the Cuban tres rather than the Spanish guitar, and developed his own technique for this Cuban guitar. During his extremely long career, Chicho sang and played the son in streets, plazas, cafés, nightclubs and other venues throughout Cuba. In the 1920s, when the sextetos became popular, he was forced to sell his compositions to these larger groups and their composers in order to survive. His compositions include Tóma mamá que te manda tía, Evaristo, No te metas Caridad, Ojalá (sones); Yo era dichoso, Al fin mujer (bolero-sones); Qué más me pides, La saya de Oyá (guaguancos). He worked throughout Cuba, and latterly a short film was made of him.
