= Suavecito (1929 song) =

Single by Septeto Nacional
- B-side: "Incitadora región"
- Released: 1930
- Recorded: June 1930
- Genre: Son
- Label: Brunswick
- Songwriter(s): Ignacio Piñeiro

Septeto Nacional singles chronology
"El que siembra su maíz" (1929)	"Suavecito" (1930)	"Quémala" (1930)

"Suavecito" is a Cuban son written by Ignacio Piñeiro and first recorded by his Septeto Nacional in 1929. It is a standard of the son repertoire and one of the biggest hits by the Septeto Nacional. It has been covered by numerous artists including Cuarteto Machín, Celia Cruz, Orquesta Aragón and Sierra Maestra.

The opening line of the song ("El son es lo más sublime, para el alma divertir...") has become one of the most popular phrases in Cuban music.

== Background and recording ==
Founded in 1927, the Sexteto Nacional was directed by rumbero and sonero Ignacio Piñeiro, who decided to establish his own group following the dissolution of the short-lived Sexteto Occidente directed by María Teresa Vera. At the Occidente, Piñeiro had to learn how to play the double bass, and instrument he continued to play with his Nacional. After extensive touring in Cuba, two recording sessions in New York, and the addition of trumpeter Lázaro Herrera "El Jabao" to become a septeto, the Nacional made its way to Spain for the Ibero-American Exposition of 1929, which was taking place in Seville and saw other Cuban ensembles perform, such as the Trío Matamoros. The Nacional's performance was a success, prompting further shows in Madrid for the royal family and a contract with the record label His Master's Voice, known in Spain as La Voz de su Amo, to record and release several of the songs they played on tour.

"Suavecito" was first recorded by the Nacional in Madrid on 3 October 1929, during the sessions for His Master's Voice, and released shortly thereafter. The lineup for the session included vocalists Bienvenido León and Juan de la Cruz, trumpeter Lázaro Herrera, bongosero Agustín Gutiérrez, guitarist Eutimio Constantín, tresero Francisco Solares González, and the leader, Ignacio Piñeiro, on double bass. According to Jesús Blanco, Piñeiro wrote "Suavecito" about a Cuban woman named Carola whom they met in New York.

Following their performance in Seville, the group became popularly known in Spain as Los Suavecitos. Nonetheless, their Spanish recordings were not released internationally, so after their return from Europe, the Nacional recorded some of their songs in Havana, including "Suavecito". Such recording of "Suavecito" features Alfredo Valdés on lead vocals and was released in 1930 by Brunswick Records. According to Cristóbal Díaz-Ayala, the second recording of "Suavecito" could have been made as early as November 1929 in New York.

Another version of the song was recorded by the Nacional in 1959 for Seeco. This version features Carlos Embale as lead singer alongside Bienvenido León and Joseíto Núñez. After the 1960s, the Nacional continued to record primarily their former hits, including "Suavecito", on many occasions. Recordings for EGREM were made in 1973, 1977, 1978, 1980 and 1998.

== Cover versions ==
One of the first ensembles to cover "Suavecito" was the Cuarteto Machín, directed by vocalist Antonio Machín, who was the most popular Cuban singer in Spain for most of the 20th century. Many Cuban artists recorded their own versions of the song throughout the years, including Celia Cruz in 1963 and Papaíto in 1980. A charanga arrangement by Rafael Lay was recorded by Orquesta Aragón in 1956 for the 1958 album Maracas, bongó y congas. The Sexteto Habanero, historically the Nacional's main competitor, recorded the song in 1995. Also in 1995, a version was recorded by Colombian salsa band Fruko y sus Tesos.
