= Ñico Saquito =

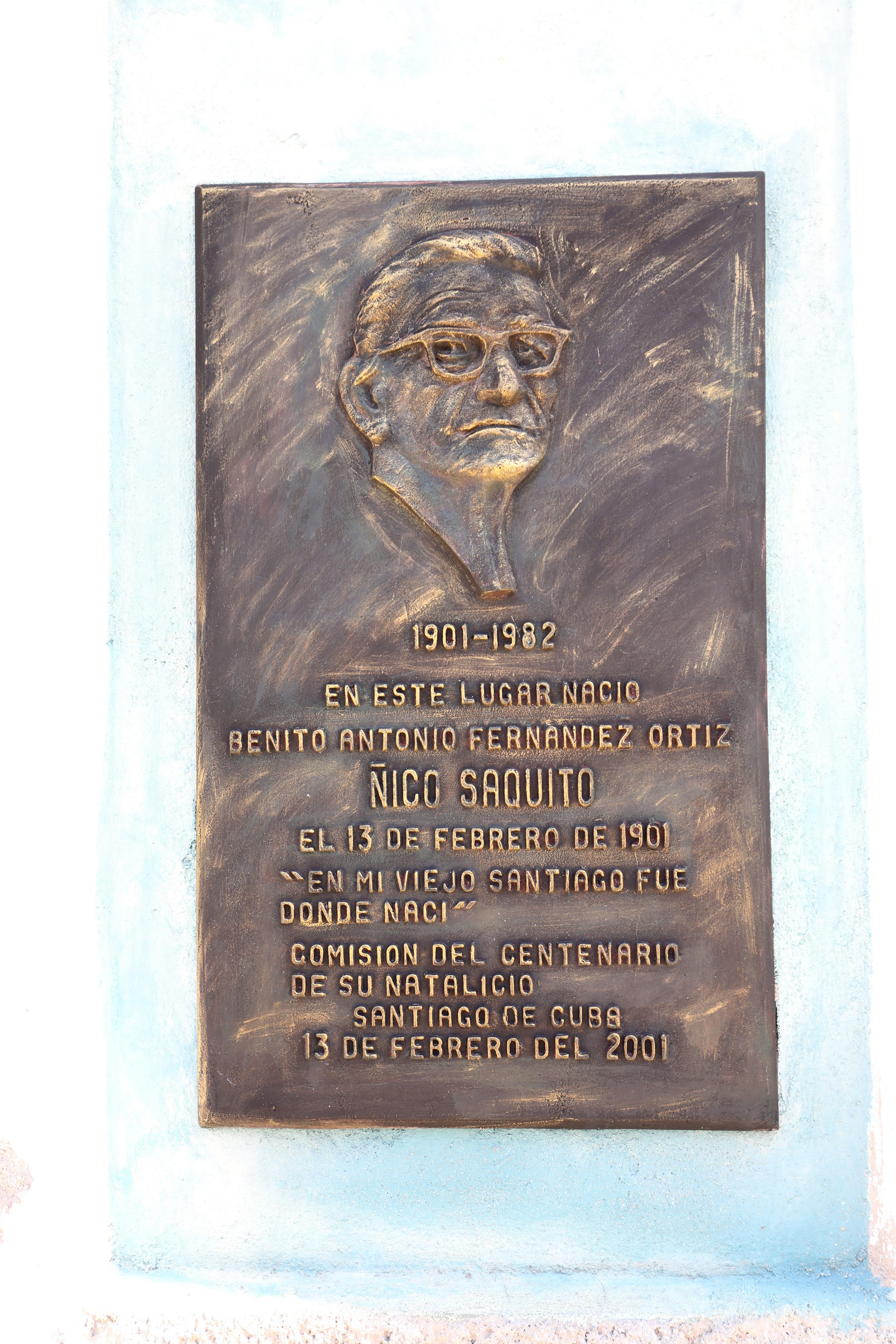

Background information
- Birth name: Benito Antonio Fernández Ortiz
- Born: 13 February 1901; Santiago de Cuba, Cuba
- Died: 4 August 1982 (aged 81); Santiago de Cuba, Cuba
- Genres: Trova, guaracha, guajira
- Occupation(s): Musician, songwriter
- Instrument(s): Guitar, vocals
- Years active: 1917–1982
- Labels: RCA Victor, Panart, EGREM

Benito Antonio Fernández Ortiz (13 February 1901 – 4 August 1982), better known as Ñico Saquito, was a Cuban trova songwriter, guitarist and singer. He is widely considered the most prolific and successful composer of guarachas, most of which he wrote during his stint as a member of Los Guaracheros de Oriente. Among his most enduring compositions are "Cuidadito compay gallo", "María Cristina", "Adiós compay gato", "Al vaivén de mi carreta", "Camina como Chencha" and "Amarrao compé".

== Life and career ==
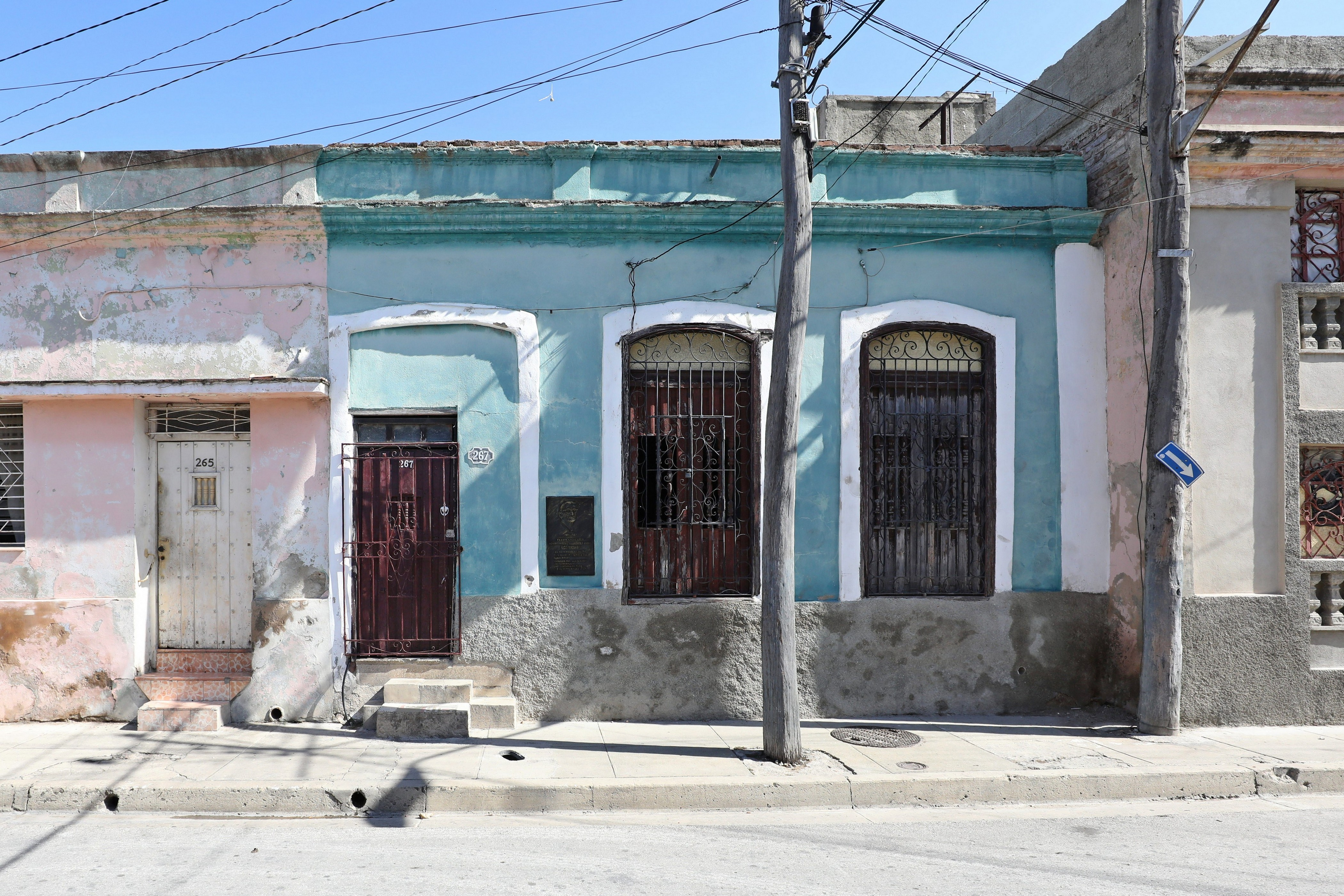
Birthplace of Ñico Saquito in Tivoli

Saquito was born on 13 February 1901, (Note: This is the date inscribed on his tombstone. Other sources, including Helio Orovio, give his birth date as 17 January 1902.) in Santiago de Cuba, the capital of the Santiago de Cuba Province (known as the Oriente Province between 1905 and 1976), notable for its traditional trova music. From an early age Saquito was a keen baseball player, using a jute sack as his baseball glove, from which his nickname originated (ñico from Antoñico, diminutive of his name due to his short stature, and saquito meaning small sack). By the age of 15 he had already attracted attention for his songwriting, and abandoned a career in baseball to start life as a trovador.

Saquito directed his own group in the 1920s, and later joined the Cuarteto Castillo, spending much of the 1930s touring Cuba with the group. His first hit came in 1936 when the Trío Matamoros recorded his guaracha "Cuidadito compay gallo". To capitalize on the song's success Saquito formed the Conjunto Compay Gallo with guitarist Florencio "Pícolo" Santana in 1940, releasing several singles on RCA Victor. The group broke up after 1941. Santana then began performing alongside guitarist Gerardo "El Chino" Macias at El Baturro, a popular tavern in Havana. Saquito subsequently formed a new group, Los Guaracheros de Oriente, of which Santana and Macías would become members. They made many recordings for RCA Victor, performed throughout Cuba and toured Puerto Rico and Venezuela in 1950. Ñico and the Guaracheros toured extensively abroad until 1960, when political conditions forced a decision as to whether or not to return to Cuba. Saquito returned, but the rest of the group stayed in Puerto Rico, continuing their career without Saquito.

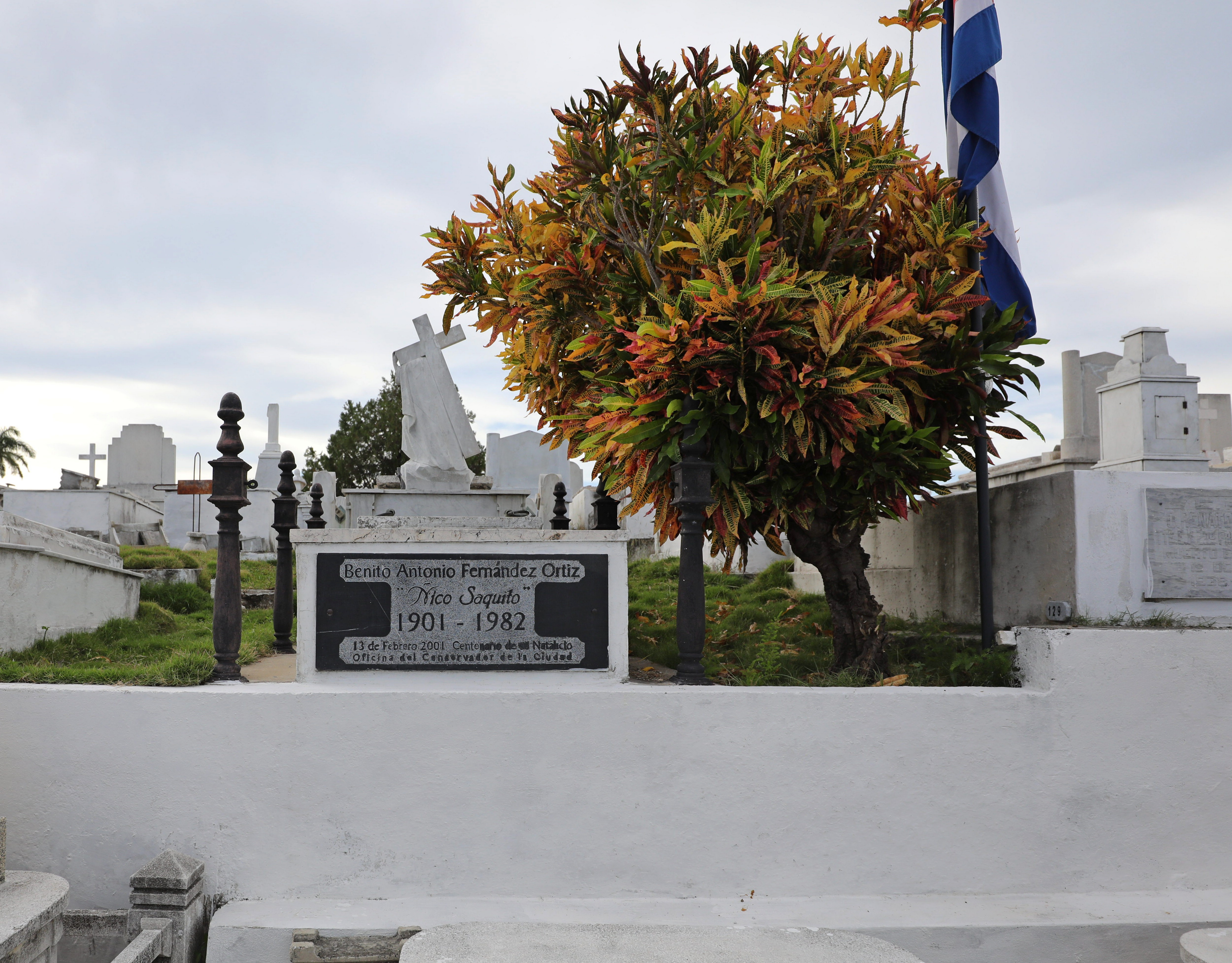
Tomb at Santa Ifigenia

He seemed to collect nicknames: to some he was "El guarachero de Oriente" (because he led the group of that name) and to others "Compay gato" (from his number "Adiós compay gato"). Later in his life Ñico played mostly in the bar-restaurant La Bodeguita del Medio, in Havana. In 1982 he recorded his last album at EGREM's Siboney studios in Santiago de Cuba with the Cuarteto Patria and the Dúo Cubano; these recordings were released posthumously on World Circuit in 1993 under the title Good-bye Mr. Cat, becoming his only American LP.

== Discography ==
- 1956: Esto es Cuba (Sonora) — with Ramón Veloz
- 1959: Son cosas de Ñico Saquito (Panart) — with Ramón Veloz
- 1960: Linda guajira (Panart)
- 1969: Ñico Saquito y su conjunto de Oriente
- 1979: Ñico Saquito (Areito)
- 1993: Good-bye Mr. Cat (World Circuit)
