= Carlos Alfredo Peyrellade =

Cuban pianist and music educator

Carlos Alfredo Peyrellade Zaldivar
- Born: 1840; Puerto Príncipe
- Died: 1908 (aged 67–68)
- Occupations: Pianist; teacher
- Known for: Founded the Carlos Alfredo Peyrellade Conservatory

Carlos Alfredo Peyrellade Zaldivar (1840–1908) was a Cuban classical pianist and music educator. He is best known as founder of the Carlos Alfredo Peyrellade Conservatory of music in Havana, Cuba.

== Early years ==
Peyrellade was born in Puerto Príncipe into a musical family. His brothers Emilio, Eduardo (1846–1830) and Federico were also musicians. His father had been a French consul in Puerto Príncipe. Carlos studied music with Nicolás Ruiz Espadero in Cuba, and his father sent him to continue his studies in Paris with Camille Marie Stamaty and Pierre Maleden. He made his debut at the Salle Pleyel Salón Saint Germain and Salón Beethoven with Belgian flautist Delphin Allard, and afterward he conducted a career as a concert pianist in Europe.

== Career ==
Peyrellade served as accompanist for the Círculo de la Unión Artística de París and replaced Louis Moreau Gottschalk in New York as professor at the piano academy. In 1865 Peyrellade returned to Puerto Príncipe, where he played a number of concerts that helped pay for the redemption of slaves. He worked from 1866 to 1871 as professor for the Benemérita Popular Santa Cecilia, and eventually settled in Havana.

Before the Cuban War of Independence, Dutch pianist Hubert de Blanck located in Havana, and went on to establish a Cuban conservatory of music in 1885. During the war, De Blanck was involved with the revolutionaries and was arrested and deported. Peyrellade took over his conservatory and went on to open and operate music schools in Havana and Camagüey as the Carlos Alfredo Peyrellade Conservatories. Peyrellade also wrote several popular songs. He died in Havana in 1908.

A number of notable musicians graduated from the Peyrellade conservatories, including Jaime Prats, Ernesto Lecuona, Adolfo Fernández, Cecilia Arizti, Rita Montaner, Tania León, Héctor García, Josie Pujol, and Dulce Beatriz.
