= Suavemente (disambiguation) =

Suavemente is a 1998 album by Elvis Crespo.

Suavemente may also refer to:

- "Suavemente" (Elvis Crespo song), 1998
- "Suavemente" (Soolking song), 2022
- Suavemente, a 1982 album and song by Crystal
- "Coast 2 Coast (Suavemente)", a 2001 song by Angie Martinez from Up Close and Personal

== See also ==
- Suave (disambiguation)
