= Josie Pujol =

Cuban violinist

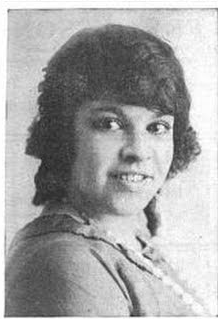
- Josie Pujol from a 1921 publication.
- Born: c. 1900
- Education: Conservatorio Peyrellade
- Occupation: Violinist

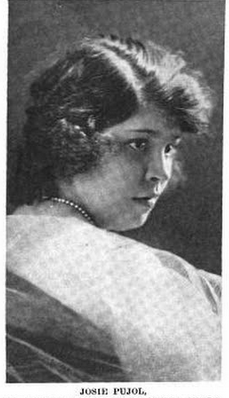
Josie Pujol, from a 1920 publication.

Josie Pujol (born around 1900) was a Cuban violinist who performed in Cuba, Canada, and the United States as a young woman.

== Early life ==
Josephine "Josie" Pujol played violin from youth. She finished her studies at the Conservatorio Peyrellade in Havana in 1916, with further studies in New York. Her sisters Clotilde and Teresa were also musicians.

== Career ==
Josephine Pujol played violin as a church accompanist in Asbury Park, New Jersey, in 1918. She played violin solos at concerts in Asbury Park in 1919. In 1920 Pujol earned good reviews in Havana for her recitals with soprano Marguerite Ringo. The following season, she played a charity benefit concert in Montreal, with tenor Merlin Davies and soprano Edith de Lys, in Burlington, Vermont, and Glen Ridge, New Jersey. "The young Cuban violinist has a warm singing tone, the worth of which is enhanced by much technical proficiency and by that blending of emotional force and self-restraint which distinguishes the true artist," commented one reporter in 1920.

She toured the American South in spring 1921, making her way back to Cuba. In 1922, she was back in New York, playing at the annual benefit for the Blind Men's Improvement Club at Aeolian Hall.
