= José Marín Varona =

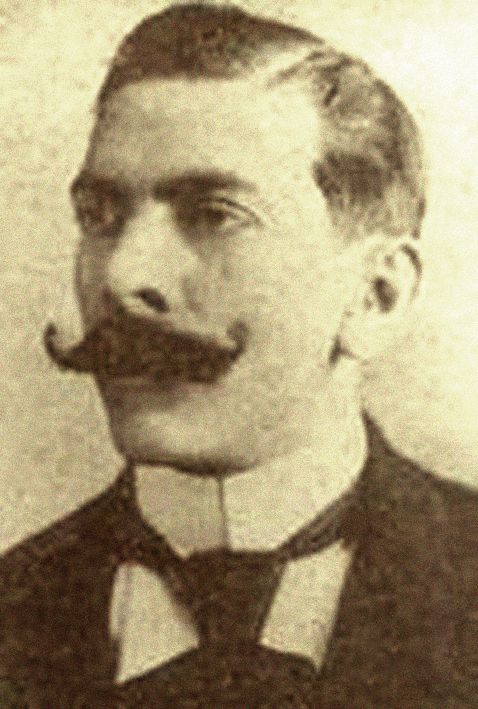
José Marín Varona.

José Marín Varona (Camagüey, March 10, 1859 – Havana, September 17, 1912) was a Cuban composer, conductor, pianist and professor.

== Biographical note ==
José Marín Varona was born on March 10, 1859, in the city of Camagüey, where he began his musical studies with professor Mariano Agüero. At a later time, Varona established his residence in Havana.

In 1896, the composer included in his zarzuela "El Brujo" the first Cuban guajira which has been historically documented.

About this piece, composer Eduardo Sánchez de Fuentes said: "The honest critique of a not very far day will bestow the author of the immortal guajira of "El Brujo" the honor to which he is undoubtedly entitled at any time".

Shortly after the premiere of "El Brujo", Marín Varona travelled to the United States because of threats received from the Spanish government because of his support of the Cuban independence movement. During his exile, he continued his musical activity and offered presentations with the purpose of collaborating with the national independence cause. In Key West, he contributed to the local media with news articles and musical critique.

Upon returning to Cuba, Marín Varona was married to the Spanish singer Amalia Rodríguez and travelled through the Americas with zarzuela and operetta companies.

In 1913, Cuban composer José Mauri offered a lecture about his work at the National Academy of Arts and Literature; and in 1916, the Infantry Band of the Army recorded four of his caprices called "Tropicales" (Esperanza, Ensueños, Novelita and Íntima) for the Victor Recording Company.

== Professional activity ==
The work of José Marín Varona links the musical activity of the end of the 19th century and the beginning of the 20th century in Cuba.

After his arrival to Havana at a very young age, Marín Varona worked as a sight singing and piano at the Municipal Conservatory; and after the Republic inauguration, in 1902, he founded the Army Staff (military) Band. In 1905 Marín Varona also organized the Artillery Band, for which he composed and arranged numerous pieces, such as the Tributo al Maine, Himno para el Yara, Huérfanos de la Patria, Gobernador Magoon and La Independencia, among others.

José Marín Varona created the "Cuba Musical" magazine,, where he exerted musical critique and published numerous articles about the Havana artistic activity during the first years of the Republic. He also collaborated as a journalist to other local publications. Marín Varona was a professor at the Municipal Conservatory of Havana and a member of National Academy of Arts and Literature, where he participated as President of the Music Section for many years. He also wrote "Complete treatise on music theory".

Marín Varona served for a long time as conductor of the Albisu Theater orchestra along with Spanish conductor Modesto Julián. He also regularly collaborated with the famous Alhambra Theater (since its foundation to 1912), for which he composed pieces such as the zarzuela "La Guaracha". He shared the podium at that venue with Maestro Rafael Palau.

== Composer ==
José Marín Varona was a prolific composer of music that included zarzuelas, romanzas, children music for piano, pot-potpourris and danzas. His work belongs to the most significant output within the Cuban nationalist movement from the end of the 19th century. The first piece he composed, the "Consuelo" waltz, was created by him when he was just twenty years old.

The "Tropicales" pieces (subtiled tropical caprices) from Marín Varona, which received an award at the Paris Universal Exposition in 1900, were defined as "real concert dances, marked by the end of the Century creole style".

In his songs it is possible to notice a notable relation between elements characteristic of popular music and those of concert music. "Siempre tú" and "Ilusión" – denominations that correspond to certain "Tropicales" pieces for, voice and piano- show an evident influence from Italian lyric style and the technical melodic difficulties of the operatic aria; while the accompaniment rhythm presents the most popular characteristics of Cuban music. Such treats may be perceived in many other of his pieces.

José Marín Varona passed away in Havana on September 17, 1912. During the funeral service the Infantry Band interpreted his song "Acuérdate de mí", and that same year the famous Cuban soprano Chalía Herrera recorded some of his works in New York City.

== Works ==
Zarzuelas

- Ábreme la puerta, F. Villoch
- El 10 de Octubre, décimas, 2V, A. Díaz
- El alcalde de la Güira, dúo amoroso, J. Robeño
- El Brujo, J. R. Barreiro
- El hijo de Camagüey, A. del Pozo
- La guaracha, F. Villoch, 1902
- La víspera de san Juan, Gua, J. B. Ubago
- Las excursionistas en la Habana, F. Villoch
- Tute arrastrado, M. Zardoya

Hymns and marches

- General Rojas; Gobernador Maggon's, Bnd (Ed. Artillery Corps Printing, 1908)
- Himno de Bayano, Himno invasor, 1899
- Himno para el Yara
- Hermanos de la Patria
- José de la Luz y Caballero
- La independencia
- La Paz; Néstor Aranguren
- The Havana Post
- Tributo al Maine

Voice and piano

- A ti
- A una mascarita
- Acuérdate de mi
- Amar es la vida
- Amor y odio
- Anhelos, 1903
- Any Name
- Banquete, concierto y baile
- Canto de amor
- Dame un beso
- Desde el mar
- El desobediente
- El desvalido
- El día
- El dulce beso
- El estudio
- El libro
- El Maestro
- El mar de Levante, 1912
- El mendigo
- El recuerdo de la infancia
- El veinte de Mayo
- Es el amor la mitad de la vida
- Ilusión
- In memoriam
- La flor marchita
- La guaracha
- La oración
- la puerta de mi Bohío
- Los caleseros
- Mi bandera
- Mi dulce amor
- Mi patria
- Perla de las Antillas
- Piedad
- Recuerdos del Bloqueo, rumba
- Serenata criolla
- Siempre tú
- Solo tú
- Tristezas
- Tu amor es mi aventura
- Tu recuerdo
- Tu canción
- Ven vida mía

Piano

- Ábreme la puerta
- Borincana
- Camagüeyana
- Dulce anhelo
- En el circo me verás
- Florimel
- Gitanilla
- Íntima
- Juguete español
- La guajira, danzón
- La hija de Oriente
- La Yuquita
- Lola
- Mal de amor
- Mi niña
- Mignon
- Misteriosa
- Nocturno
- Nostalgia
- Novelita
- Page of life
- Para ti
- Petit Minuet
- Piña mamey y zapote, danzón
- Por ti,
- danzón
- Recuerdo
- Tú ves como Cuba es libre, danzón

== See also ==
- Music of Cuba
