= Pepe Sánchez (musician) =

Cuban musician (1856–1918)

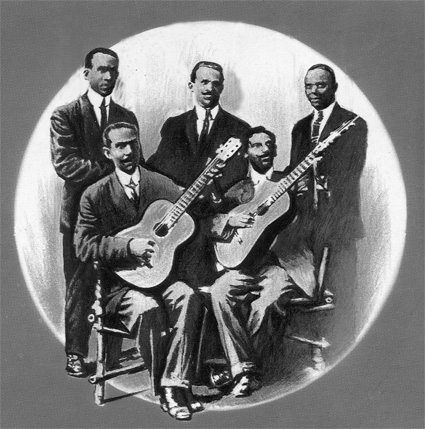
- Sánchez (guitar, left) in 1910
- Born: José Sánchez; 19 March 1856; Santiago de Cuba, Cuba
- Died: 3 January 1918 (aged 61)
- Occupation: Musician
- Known for: Creator of bolero

José "Pepe" Sánchez (19 March 1856 – 3 January 1918) was a Cuban musician, singer and composer. He is known as the father of the trova style and the creator of the Cuban bolero.

A native of Santiago de Cuba, Sánchez was originally a tailor, and later the co-owner of a copper mine, and the representative in his home town of a cloth manufacturer in Kingston, Jamaica. He moved in upper- and middle-class circles in Santiago despite being a mulatto; his work as a businessman and musician brought him recognition and acceptance.

Pepe had some experience in bufo theatre, but had no formal training in music. With remarkable natural talent, he composed numbers in his head and never wrote them down. As a result, most of these numbers are now lost for ever, though some two dozen or so survive because friends and disciples wrote them down. His first bolero, Tristezas, is still remembered today. He also created advertisement jingles before radio was born. He was the model and teacher for the great trovadores who followed him: Sindo Garay, Rosendo Ruiz, Manuel Corona and Alberto Villalón.

Other works of note are Pobre artista, Rosa I, II and III, Cuando oí la expressión de tu canto, Cuba, mi patria querida, Caridad, Esperanza, Naturaleza and Himno a Maceo.

There is one modern recording of his music:

- La música de Pepe Sánchez. Siboney LD–315
