= Patricio Ballagas =

Cuban Composer and Guitarist (1879-1920)

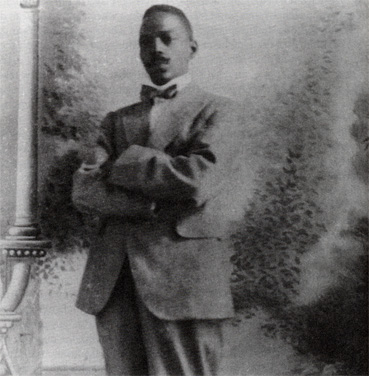
Patricio Ballagas

Patricio Ballagas Palacio (Camagüey, 17 March 1879 – Havana, 15 February 1920) was a Cuban composer and guitarist, considered an important innovator in trova music. His compositions were written in 4/4 time when most others were composing in 2/4 time; and more important, he invented 'double text', where the melody is superimposed over the lead vocal, which then becomes the second voice. He introduced contracanto into the trova form, so that the second voice changes from being intimately connected to the first voice to becoming a melodic and harmonic expression with its own identity.

The historian of trova, Dulcilla Cañizares, asks the question "Por qué no, Patricio Ballagas? She thinks he should rank as one of the top five of trova. His short life probably militated against greater recognition of his talent. "Timidez", written in 1914, is his most famous number. As a musician, Ballagas was a member of the Cuarteto Nano and formed a duo with Alejandro Montalván.
