= Dulce Beatriz =

Cuban-born artist (1931–2021)

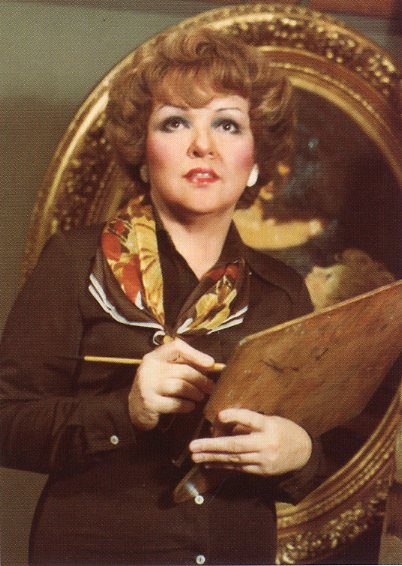
- Dulce Beatriz
- Born: Dulce Hernández Moreno de Ayala; 17 March 1931; Havana, Cuba
- Died: 19 October 2021 (aged 90); Miami, Florida, U.S.
- Resting place: Flagler Memorial Park, Miami, Florida
- Education: Escuela Nacional de Bellas Artes "San Alejandro"
- Occupations: Painter and Sculptor
- Spouse: Leonardo Beatriz
- Awards: Order of Isabella the Catholic
- Website: http://www.dulcebeatriz.com/

Dulce Beatriz (née Dulce Hernández Moreno de Ayala, 17 March 1931 – 19 October 2021) was a Cuban-born artist known for her Impressionist-style paintings.

== Life and career ==
Dulce Beatriz was born in Havana on 17 March 1931, to a family of Spanish descent. Her father, José María Hernández, managed a bakery. Her mother, Dulce Moreno Ayala, was a teacher. She initially studied to be a teacher, graduating from the Escuela de Maestros de Kindergarten (Kindergarten Teacher's School) in Havana in 1949, followed by studies in music pedagogy at the Carlos Alfredo Peyrellade Conservatory of music in Havana. During that time she also exhibited her art work at the Havana City Hall's Hall of Mirrors. She went on to study art formally at the Escuela Nacional de Bellas Artes "San Alejandro" in Havana where she graduated in 1955 and received a scholarship for further study abroad. In 1959 she married Leonardo Beatriz, a concert guitarist, (Spanish guitar) art restorer and appraiser. Also during that time she was recognized by a well known newspaper the Excelcior in Cuba. [Elogios a una exposicion Exelcior, Pg. B2; August 22, 1959]

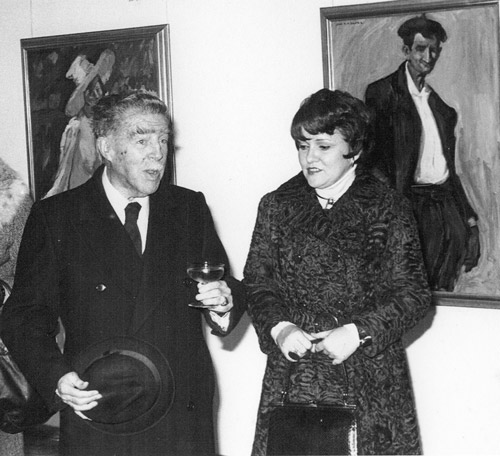
Dulce Beatriz and Juan Contreras y López de Ayala

The couple emigrated to the United States in 1960 and settled in Florida. Since that time, she has exhibited widely in Florida and Spain. October 1963: Works by Dulce Beatriz are exhibited at the "Loft on the Mile" Gallery of Art, Coral Gables, Florida. In 1971: Dulce inaugurated her gallery of paintings for the first time in Managua, Nicaragua at the Rubén Darío National Theatre (Spanish: Teatro Nacional Rubén Darío)Rubén Darío National Theatre#History. In 1972: Jean Tiroche, internationally known art dealer, collector and curator, hosts an exhibition of works by Dulce Beatriz at the 'Gallerie Jean Tiroche', Palm Beach, Florida;. On the exhibition program Mr. Tiroche wrote: "For the first time this gallery has made an exception in presenting a painter from the Spanish School since we have always been known for representing the most noteworthy Impressionists and Post-Impressionists of the Paris School.

During the decades of the 1970s and 1980s several local galleries in South Florida hosted exhibitions of paintings by Dulce Beatriz in Miami, Fort Lauderdale and in Palm Beach. Two of her paintings, El monasterio del Parral and Paisaje floridiano, were acquired by the Museo Español de Arte Contemporáneo in Madrid (now known as the Museo Nacional Centro de Arte Reina Sofía). In 1979: "La Pintora Dulce H. de Beatriz" - Una artista que se comunica a traves de su obra" [The painting of Dulce H. de Beatriz; An artists who communicates through her work] Interview and report by Munoz, C. - Galeria, El Miami Herald Also in 1979 an article in Spanish titled "De Mujer A Mujer" (From Woman to Woman) Page 2b Diario Las Americas ; Interview and report by Carmencita San Miguel showcasing her success, biography and her brilliant paintings. She became better-known, local South Florida media frequently interviewed or wrote about Dulce Beatriz and her work.

In 1983 she received the Orden de Isabel la Católica. Her papers are held in the University of Miami Cuban Heritage Collection. Throughout the years the work of Dulce Beatriz has been showcased by magazines and other media especially those targeting Spanish speaking audiences. His Excellency Dr. Juan Contreras y Lopez de Ayala, Marquis of Lozoya, Director of the San Fernando Royal Academy of Fine Arts inaugurated several of Dulce Beatriz successful exhibitions in Madrid, Spain her exhibitions in that capital. The Marquis of Lozoya was the first to propose Dulce Beatriz as a recipient of the Royal Order of Isabel the Catholic, with support from the Honorable Carlos Martinez de Irujo, Duke of Huescar and by the Honorable Stephen P. Clark, Mayor or Metropolitan Dade County. In 2007: Interview and article: "Light from the Depths of the Soul" by Rossi M., A, and Maurizio, G., La Isla Times, June 2007, Key Biscayne, Florida.

Beatriz died in Miami, Florida on 19 October 2021, at the age of 90.

== Publications ==
- A Quarter Century of My Life, autobiography (1972). OCLC 8362097
- Dulce Beatriz: Oil paintings, drawings, silver point, sculptures, engravings (diamond point) (2009), a collection of her work edited by Leonardo and Dulce Beatriz with a foreword by Charles K. Szabo. OCLC 457279598
