= Cecilia Arizti =

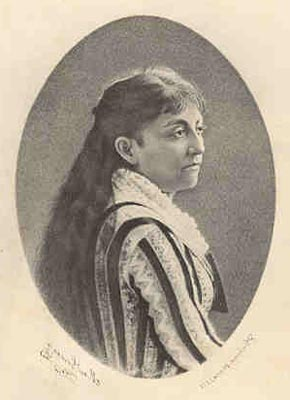
- Cecilia Arizti
- Born: October 28, 1856; Havana, Cuba
- Died: June 30, 1930 (aged 73); Havana, Cuba
- Musical career
- Occupations: Musician, composer
- Instrument: Piano

Cecilia Arizti Sobrino (28 October 1856 – 30 June 1930) was a Cuban composer, pianist and music educator.

== Biography ==
=== Early life and education ===
Cecilia Arizti was born in La Loma del Ángel, Havana, the daughter of pianist Fernando Arizti and his wife Teresa Sobrino. Arizti studied music with her father and composition with Francisco Fuentes and Espadero Ruiz, and showed an early talent for composition. She began writing music when she was eight years old, including a sacred work, Ave Maria. Cuban and foreign intellectuals, artists, and other cultural elites often gathered in the her family's home for salon-style evenings, giving Arizti access to a variety of musical influences and knowledge.

=== Career ===
After completing her studies, Arizti performed as a concert pianist in Cuba and the United States, including venues like Carnegie Hall and Chickering Hall. She became a professor at the Conservatory Peyrellade, and published a manual of piano technique.

Several of her piano works were published in New York City in 1887, including Mazurka, Danza, and Reverie. Her piano trio, written in 1893, is the first known chamber music piece written by Cuban woman composer. The Norton/Grove Dictionary of Women composers describes her music as "marked by melodic beauty and careful construction," and as showing influence from Frédéric Chopin. All told she composed at least twenty-two works for piano during her lifetime.

=== Legacy ===
The Cuban Biblioteca Nacional José Marti began publishing a series of her pieces for piano in 1959. Her manuscripts are held at this library, and at the Museo Nacional de la Música in Havana.

== Works ==
=== Style ===
Many of Arizti's works are for piano and are composed in Subjectivist Romantic style. Arizti's compositions bridge the gap between Classical styles and the musical Nationalism that would soon sweep through much of Latin America.

Selected works include:

==== Chamber ====
- Chamber Trio for piano, violin and cello (1893)
- Melodia romantica for violin and piano
- Pieces for violin and piano

==== Piano ====
- Impromptu in F minor
- Vals lent
- Romanza
- Nocturno
- Caprici
- Reverie, Op. 16

==== Vocal ====
- Romantica, song for voice and piano

==== Sacred ====
- Ave Maria

== Discography ==
- Cecilia Arizti, Nocturno, Op. 13, performed by Antonio Oyarzábal on the album El Fin Del Silencio: Latin American Women Composers, Pixaudio label.
