= Francisco Covarrubias =

Cuban actor and dramatist

Francisco Covarrubias (1775 in Havana – 1850) was a Cuban actor and a dramatist known as "the father of Cuban theatre". Covarrubias was notable in the history of the music of Cuba through his involvement in the early days of Cuban musical theatre. He has a memorial plaque at the National Theater of Cuba where the second-largest auditorium, the Covarrubias Hall, is named after him.
