= Suave =

Suave may refer to:

- Suave (brand), a brand owned by Unilever
- Suave (singer) (born 1966), American R&B singer
- "Suave" (song), a song by Luis Miguel
- "Suave (Kiss Me)", a 2011 song by American singer-songwriter Nayer
- "Suave", a song by Calle 13 from Calle 13
- "Suave", a 2017 song by El Alfa
- "Suave", a 2023 song by Big Time Rush featuring Maffio and Calacote
- Suave (2022), a Pulitzer-winning podcast about David Luis Gonzalez

== See also ==
- Suave House Records, a record label based in Houston, Texas
- Mr. Suave, a 2003 Filipino film
- Suavecito (disambiguation)
- Suavemente (disambiguation)
