= Clavé =

- Commune
- Location of Clavé
- Location within France Location within Nouvelle-Aquitaine
- Coordinates: 46°29′38″N 0°12′51″W
- Country: France
- Region: Nouvelle-Aquitaine
- Department: Deux-Sèvres
- Arrondissement: Parthenay
- Canton: La Gâtine

Government
  - Mayor (2020–2026): Vincent Legeron
- Area^{1}: 19.53 km^{2} (7.54 sq mi)
- Elevation: 180 m (590 ft)
- Highest elevation: 216 m (709 ft)
- Lowest elevation: 108 m (354 ft)
- Population (2023): 348
  - Density: 17.8/km^{2} (46.2/sq mi)
- Time zone: UTC+01:00 (CET)
  - Summer (DST): UTC+02:00 (CEST)
- INSEE/Postal code: 79092 /79420
- ^{1} French Land Register data, which excludes lakes, ponds, glaciers > 1 km^{2} (0.386 sq mi or 247 acres) and river estuaries.

Clavé (French pronunciation: [klave]) is a commune in the Deux-Sèvres department in the Nouvelle-Aquitaine region in western France.

== See also ==
- Communes of the Deux-Sèvres department
