= Carlos Anckermann =

Cuban musician (1829–1909)

- Birth name: Carlos Anckermann Riera
- Born: 10 March 1829; Palma de Mallorca, Spain
- Died: 17 February 1909 (aged 79); Havana, Cuba
- Genres: Contradanza, classical music
- Occupation(s): Musician, composer, teacher
- Instrument(s): Violin, clarinet

Carlos Anckermann Riera (10 March 1829 – 17 February 1909) was a Cuban musician, composer and teacher. Born in Palma de Mallorca, Spain, he moved to Havana at the age of 18, where he played clarinet in a military band and violin at the Tacón Theatre. He taught at the Hubert de Blanck Conservatory and recorded with pianist Federico Edelmann (1795–1848). He composed numerous religious pieces, such as the Gran Misa, as well as chamber music, zarzuelas, contradanzas and fantasías.

His sons also became notable composers and musicians: Jorge Anckermann (1877–1941) and Fernando Anckermann (1890–1933).
