= Asturias, patria querida =

Regional anthem of Asturias, Spain

English: Asturias, Homeland Beloved
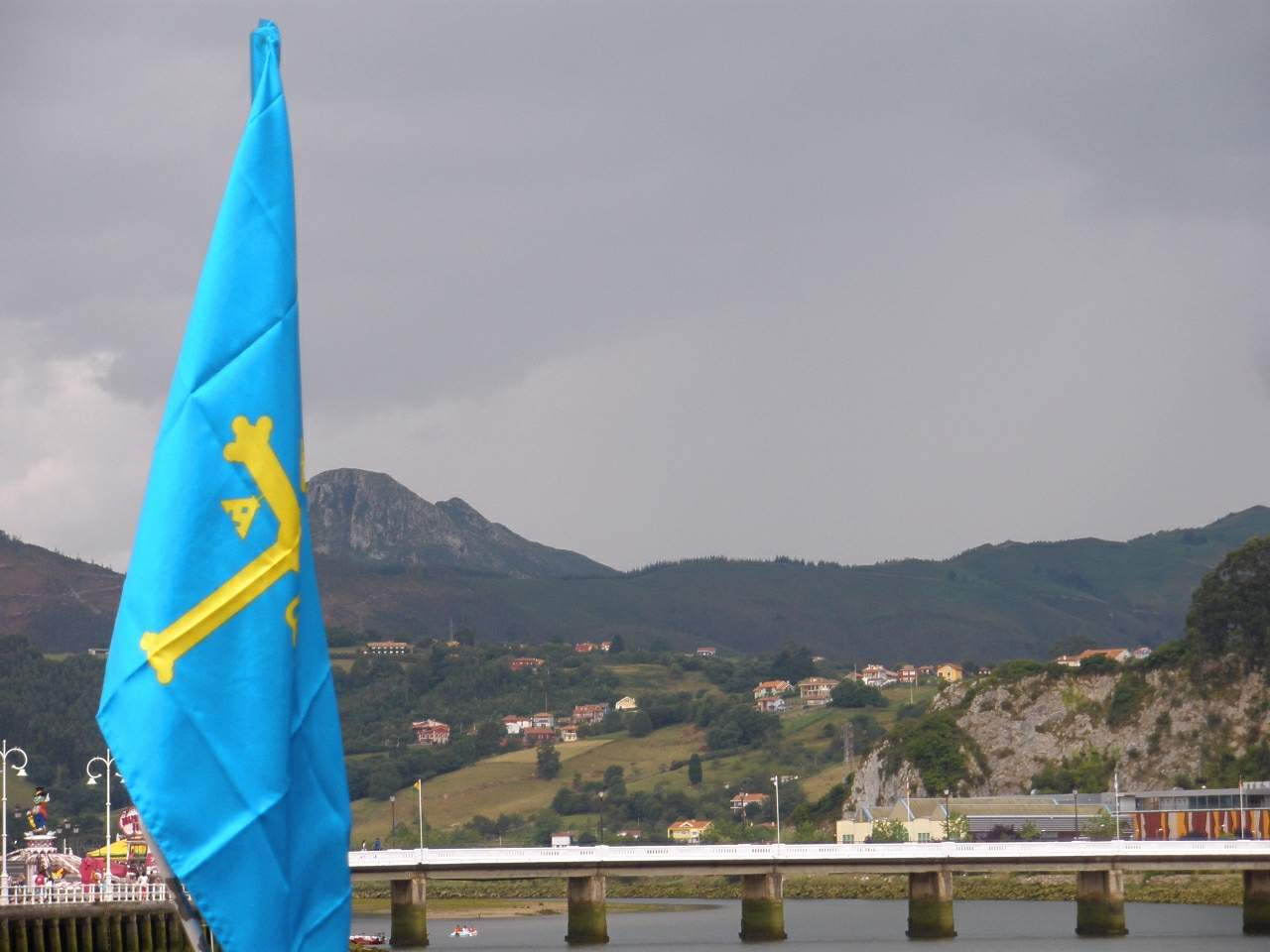
- Flag of Asturias
- Regional anthem of Asturias, Spain
- Lyrics: Ignacio Piñeiro
- Adopted: 27 April 1984

Audio sample
- Asturias, patria querida: file; help

"Asturias, patria querida" (Spanish) / "Asturies, patria querida" (Asturian), translating to "Asturias, Beloved Homeland", is the regional anthem of the autonomous community of Asturias, Spain.

This adaptation of a much slower song from the neighbouring lands of Cantabria (Madre, cuando voy a leña) was appointed as official anthem after a contest in Oviedo in the 1890s. It has both a Spanish and an Asturian version. It is also a popular melody for bagpipers.

In the mid-2000s, it was discovered that the first song lyrics were written in Cuba. The father of the author had returned to his beloved Asturias to die, the author—Ignacio Piñeiro—dedicated the song to his father. The music was different; it is believed to be a melody that Upper Silesian miners from the area of Opole Silesia—that worked in Asturian coal mines at the beginning of the 20th century—had brought to Asturias. In fact, the song is still known in Poland, where it used to be taught as a patriotic song (with the lyrics brought back by Polish brigadistas).

A few versions of the anthem were created by the Republican side of the Spanish Civil War, therefore the anthem was seen as a miners song (it is said the miners' revolt in Asturias in 1934 was a wake-up call to the civil war) and as a left-wing song by right-wing people.

== Lyrics ==
=== Current version ===
Spanish lyrics

Asturias, Patria querida,
Asturias de mis amores;
¡quién estuviera en Asturias
en todas las ocasiones!

Tengo de subir al árbol,
tengo de coger la flor,
y dársela a mi morena
que la ponga en el balcón,

Que la ponga en el balcón,
que la deje de poner,
tengo de subir al árbol
y la flor he de coger.

Asturian lyrics

Asturies, Patria querida,
Asturies, de los mios amores
¡Ai, quién tuviere n'Asturies
en toles ocasiones!

Teo de xubir al árbol,
teo de coyer la flor
y dá-yl'a la mio morena,
que la ponga nel balcón.

Que la ponga nel balcón
que la dexe de poner,
teo de xubir al árbol
y la flor teo de coyer.

English translation

Asturias, homeland beloved,
Asturias of my loved ones.
The one who'd be in Asturias
On all occasions!

I have to climb the tree,
I have to pick the flower
And give it to my brunette,
To put on the balcony.

May she put it on the balcony,
May she stop putting it,
I have to climb the tree
and I have to pick the flower.

Polish version

Asturio, ziemio mych młodych lat,
Asturio, ziemio jedyna,
do mojej ziemi chcę wrócić wnet
i wrócę, jeśli nie zginę.

Wrócę i wejdę na drzewo
i zerwę kwiat pełen rosy,
i dam go mojej czarnulce,
aby go wpięła we włosy.

Asturio, ziemio mych młodych lat,
Asturio, ziemio mych marzeń,
o, bracie, gdybyś Asturię znał,
rozumiałbyś, czemu płaczę.

Wrócę, zobaczę Owiedo,
chwycę karabin i granat,
pójdę się bić za Asturię,
moją ojczyznę kochaną.

English translation

Asturias, land of my young years,
Asturias, the only land,
I want to return to my land soon
and I will come back if I don't die.

I will come back and climb the tree
and pick a flower full of dew,
and I'll give it to my brunette
to tie it in her hair.

Asturias, land of my young years,
Asturias, land of my dreams,
oh brother, if you knew Asturias,
you would understand why I am crying.

I will come back, I will see Oviedo,
I'll grab a rifle and a grenade
I will go to fight for Asturias,
my beloved homeland.

=== Asturian miners' strike version ===
Spanish lyrics

Asturias, Tierra bravía,
Asturias, de luchadores;
No hay otra como mi Asturias
para las revoluciones.

Tengo de bajar a Oviedo
empuñando mi fusil,
y morirme disparando
contra la Guardia Civil.

Contra la Guardia Civil
y los cobardes de Asalto,
tengo de bajar a Oviedo
y morirme disparando.

Los obreros en Asturias
demostraron su heroismo,
venciendo a la clerigalla
y al feroz capitalismo.

Los de Lerroux y la CEDA
son los verdugos de España,
los que roban las conquistas
del obrero que trabaja.

Asturian lyrics

Asturies, Tierra bravida,
Asturies, de lluchadores;
nun hai otra como'l mio Asturies
pa les revoluciones

Tengo que baxar a Uviéu
empuñando'l mio fusil
y morreme disparando
contra la Guardia Civil.

Contra la Guardia Civil
y los cobardes d'Asaltu;
tengo que baxar a Uviéu
y morreme disparando.

Los obreros, n'Asturies,
demostraronel so heroísmu
venciendo a la clerigalla
y al feroz capitalismu.

Los de Lerroux y DEXAR
son los verdugos d'España,
los que roben les conquistes
del obreru que trabaya.

English lyrics

Asturias, fierce land,
Asturias, of fighters;
There is no other like my Asturias
when it comes to revolutions.

I need to go down to Oviedo
carrying my rifle,
and die shooting
at the Civil Guard.

At the Civil Guard
and at the cowards in the assault unit,
I need to go down to Oviedo
and die shooting.

Workers in Asturias
proved their heroism,
defeating the clergy
and vile Capitalism.

Lerroux's people and the CEDA
are the executioners of Spain,
those who steal the conquests
of the laborious worker.

== See also ==
- Anthems of the autonomous communities of Spain
