= Ignacio Piñeiro =

Cuban musician, bandleader and composer (1888–1969)

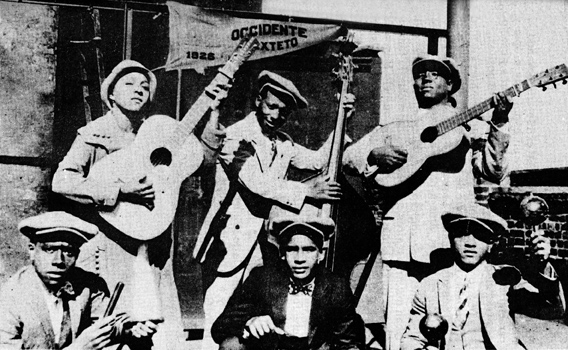
- Sexteto Occidente, New York, 1926. Piñeiro is standing in the center.

Background information
- Born: Ignacio Piñeiro Martínez; May 21, 1888; Havana, Cuba
- Died: March 12, 1969 (aged 80) Havana, Cuba
- Genres: Cuban rumba, guaguancó, son cubano, afro, guajira, guaracha
- Occupations: Musician, bandleader, songwriter
- Instrument: Double bass
- Years active: 1903-1969
- Label: Columbia

Ignacio Piñeiro Martínez (May 21, 1888 – March 12, 1969) was a Cuban musician, bandleader and composer whose career started in rumba and flowered in the rise of the son. He was one of the most important composers of son music; in total he wrote about 327 numbers, mostly sones.

Piñeiro was a brilliant rumbero who worked with musical groups from 1903 onwards, starting when he was fifteen years old. In 1906, he was a member of the Timbre de Oro coro de clave y guaguancó (a vocal group precursor of contemporary guaguancó), and later directed Los Roncos, another famous coro de guaguancó. He was taught the double bass by María Teresa Vera, and in 1926 he was a member of her band, Sexteto Occidente, which recorded in New York City. In 1927 he founded the Sexteto Nacional de Ignacio Piñeiro, later simply known as Sexteto Nacional, in which he was the director and songwriter. With the addition of a trumpet the band became the Septeto Nacional.

For financial reasons, Piñeiro quit the group in 1935. For the next two years, it was led by trumpet player Lázaro Herrera until disbanding in 1937. Piñeiro became for some years the leader and principal songwriter of Los Roncos.

The Septeto Nacional was recreated several times from 1954 onwards, initially under Piñeiro's direction. It continues to perform.

Piñeiro's composition "Échale salsita", written on a train to Chicago in 1930, influenced George Gershwin's later Cuban Overture. The two men met when Gershwin visited Cuba in February 1932. Many of Piñeiro's songs have been performed by other artists, such as Ray Barretto ("Don Lengua") and René Álvarez ("A la lae la la").

In 1999, Piñeiro was posthumously inducted into the International Latin Music Hall of Fame.

== Compositions ==
- "Dónde estabas anoche" (1925)
- "Asturias, patria querida" (lyrics, 1926)
- "Don Lengua"
- "A la lae la la"
- ”Esas no son cubanas"
- "Mentira"
- "Bardo"
- "Mayeya, no jueges con los santos"
- "Las cuatro palomas"
- "Noche de conga"
- "Coco mai mai"
- "Suavecito" (1929)
- "Échale salsita" (1930)
- "Lindo yambú"
- "Guaguancó callejero"
- "Lejana campiña"
- "Buey viejo"
- "Llegó la tora"
