= Cuban motion =

Stylized hip movement in dance

Cuban motion is a stylized dance movement characterized by a rhythmic rotation of the hips around the spine, caused by the bending and straightening of the knees (though the knees remain "soft"—slightly bent—at all times). It is a component of American Rhythm dances, including bachata, mambo, salsa, rhumba, merengue, samba and cha-cha-cha. It tends to be easier to dance and more noticeable when the music is slow.
