= Criolla =

Genre of music in the Dominican Republic

Criolla is a genre of Dominican music and traditional Dominican style of romantic serenade and sentimental song that developed from the country's 19th-century urban bohemian culture. Characterized by its expressive melodies, poetic lyrics, and guitar-based accompaniment for nighttime performances.

Historical research suggests that the genre evolved from European barcaroles introduced to the Dominican Republic around the mid-19th century, developing into a distinct Dominican musical form during the 1860s.

Emerged in the Dominican Republic with La Dorila, by composer Alberto Vázquez, which was very popular in that country at the end of the 19th century; it was also popular in Puerto Rico during the same period. Isabel Aretz, citing the German pianist Albert Friedenthal, reproduces an example of a criolla, notated by this musician, in which he finds great similarity to the bambuco. It consists of a short introduction and two sections, generally sixteen measures each. The length of each section is not limited to a specific number of measures, nor is its modal character. It is written in 6/8 time and has a slow, relaxed character.

Argeliers León, when comparing the criolla with the guajira, considered that: criollas made use of more fluid melodic lines and of a superimposition of 6/8 over an accompaniment strongly marked in 3/4. In addition to making use of these characteristics taken from the song (the form), the combination of 6/8 and 3/4, and the accompanying guitar patterns, which were certainly borrowed from the music of the rural peasant, the guajiras and criollas also made use of the half cadence (tonic–dominant), as a subtle influence of the modal character of the peasant's singing.

Like the Clave and the Guajira (music), and other genres in Latin America, the formal structure of the Criolla consist of a brief introduction, followed by two sections of 16 measures each. The first one in a minor tone, and the second one in its major direct relative. The essential rhythm of the Criolla is the same as that of the Clave, the Vertical Hemiola, which appears consistently in the base part of those songs.

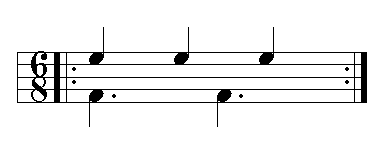
Vertical Hemiola. Reproducir

The Cuban traditional Trova singers also adopted the Clave and Criolla genres, which became part of their repertoire. Some famous composers of Criollas were: Jorge Anckermann (Linda criolla), Alberto Villalón (Quiero besarte) and Sindo Garay (Mujer bayamesa).

Although the basic structure of the Guajira (music), the Clave and the Criolla is almost identical, it is possible to observe a certain style evolution that may suggest a possible relationship in the development of those three genres. For example, the rhythmic pattern of the Vertical Hemiola does not appear in the first versions of the Guajira (music), so therefore it may have been included at a later time, maybe due to the influence of the Coros de Clave or Criolla. Also the modulation style from a minor to a major mode, which already appears in the famous Guajira (music) "El arroyo que murmura" by Jorge Anckermann, varies in the posterior Criollas of Trovadores Sindo Garay and Manuel Corona, in which they utilize much more complex modulations than in previous versions.

== See also ==
- Music of the Dominican Republic
