= María Teresa Vera =

Cuban singer, guitarist and composer (1895–1965)

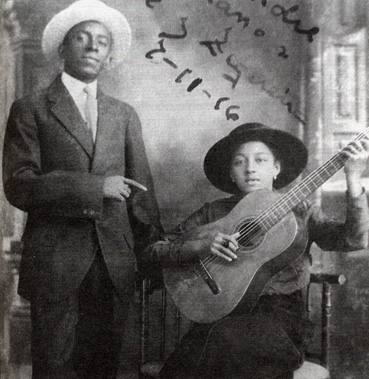
- María Teresa Vera with Rafael Zequeira in 1916

Background information
- Born: María Teresa Vera; February 6, 1895; Guanajay
- Origin: Guanajay, Cuba
- Died: December 17, 1965 (aged 70) Havana
- Genres: Trova
- Occupations: Singer-songwriter, guitarist
- Years active: 1911–1962
- Influenced by Manuel Corona, Carlos Godínez

María Teresa Vera (February 6, 1895 – December 17, 1965) was a Cuban singer, guitarist and composer. She was an outstanding example of the Cuban trova movement.

== Career ==
She started her career as a singer in 1911 in a theater where she sang the criolla Mercedes of Manuel Corona. Her first guitar teacher was the cigar-roller José Díaz. Manuel Corona continued her musical education by explaining such things as the different methods for first and second guitar, and eventually taught her his compositions.

She formed a duo with Rafael Zequeira from 1916 until 1924 when he fell ill and died. They made over a hundred recordings together in New York, most of which have not survived. Then she met Carlos Godinez, a composer, who taught her more about the guitar; the friendship lasted until his death in 1950.

She then formed the Sexteto Occidente in 1925 with Miguel García as first voice, clavé and Director (because he knew most about music), Ignacio Piñeiro on double bass, Julio Torres Biart on tres, Manuel Reinoso on bongo and Francisco Sánchez on maracas. They were a group of talented musicians who would have sparkling careers.

She joined Lorenzo Hierrezuelo as a duo in 1935, and this duo lasted for 27 years. For much of this time Hierrezuelo ran his duo with Vera alongside his partnership with Compay Segundo (Francisco Repilado), as the duo Los Compadres.

One of her best compositions, the habanera Veinte años, has been performed by a number of Cuban artists; Sólo pienso en ti, a bolero–son, is also well-known. In 1945 she was contracted to Circuito CMQ for the radio program Cosas de Ayer. In the 1950s, she appeared in the TV program El Casino de la Alegría and in the 1960s she received public tributes on her retirement in 1962.

== Legacy ==
In his biography Jorge Calderón gives the opinions of 32 Cuban composers and musicians on her career. Silvio Rodríguez said of her:

Her voice was without vibrato, dry; hitting the notes, only prolonging a note so as to slide from one tone to another, which gave [her voice] a grace, or, much better, a singular character. Her production seemed nonchalant, natural, colloquial ... Always there were variations on the original melody, [since] she was always interpreting [the piece] creatively.

Pablo Milanés contented himself with saying "María Teresa is for me the embodiment of Cuban song."

María Teresa Linares, the musicologist, said of her and Hierrezuelo:

I believe the most important period [for them] was their 27 years as a duet, Lorenzo on first guitar, Vera on second. Hierrezuelo's voice was at its best ... [and] María Teresa's voice was unrivaled at the time. The quality of their appoggiaturas, adornments, refinements, and their interpretation ... reached its highest point. All in all, it was the most sublime expression of the Cuban song.

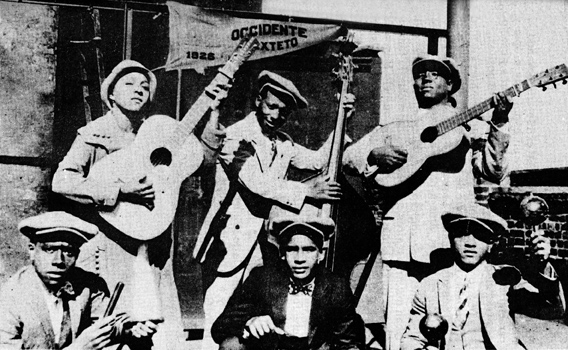
Sexteto Occidente, New York 1926 back: María Teresa Vera (guitar), Ignacio Piñeiro (double bass), Julio Torres Biart (tres); front: Miguelito Garcia (clavé), Manuel Reinoso (bongó) and Francisco Sánchez (maracas)

On February 6, 2020, Google celebrated her 125th birthday with a Google Doodle.
