= Trova =

Style of Cuban popular music

Trova (Spanish: [ˈtɾoβa]) is a style of Cuban popular music originating in the 19th century. Trova was created by itinerant musicians known as trovadores who travelled around Cuba's Oriente province, especially Santiago de Cuba, and earned their living by singing and playing the guitar. According to nueva trova musician Noel Nicola, Cuban trovadors sang original songs or songs written by contemporaries, accompanied themselves on guitar, and aimed to feature music that had a poetic sensibility. This definition fits best the singers of boleros, and less well the Afrocubans singing funky sones (El Guayabero) or even guaguancós and abakuá (Chicho Ibáñez). It rules out, perhaps unfairly, singers who accompanied themselves on the piano.

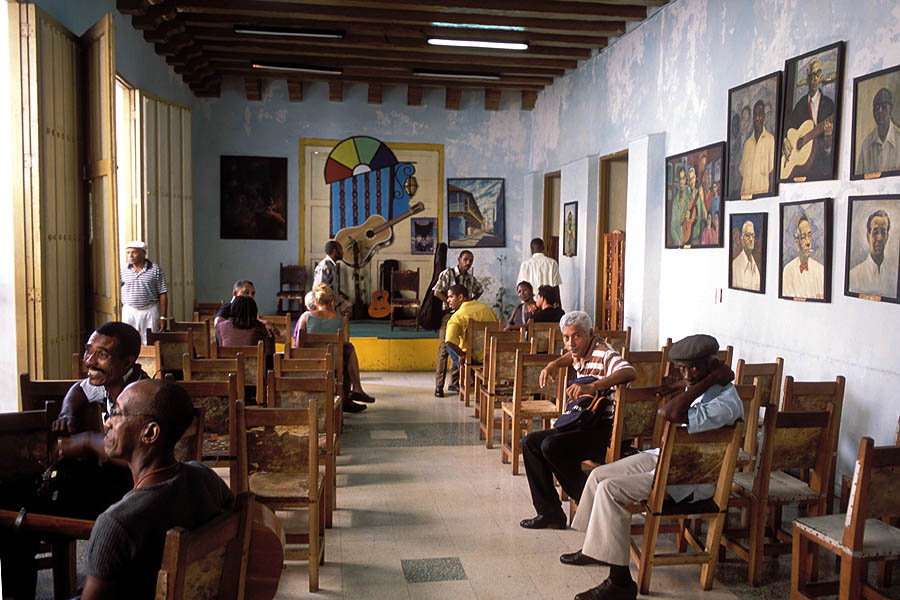
Casa de la Trova, Santiago de Cuba

Trova musicians have played an important part in the evolution of Cuban popular music. Collectively, they have been prolific as composers, and have provided a start for many later musicians whose career lay in larger groupings. Socially, they reached every community in the country, and have helped to spread Cuban music throughout the world.

== The founders ==
Pepe Sánchez, born José Sánchez (Santiago de Cuba, 19 March 1856 – 3 January 1918), is known as the father of the trova style and the creator of the Cuban bolero. He had some experience in bufo, but had no formal training in music. With remarkable natural talent, he composed numbers in his head and never wrote them down. As a result, most of these numbers are now lost forever, though some two dozen or so survive because friends and disciples wrote them down. His first bolero, Tristezas, is still remembered today. He also created advertisement jingles before the radio. He was the model and teacher for the great trovadores who followed him.

The first, and one of the longest-lived, was Sindo Garay, born Antonio Gumersindo Garay Garcia (Santiago de Cuba, 12 April 1867 – Havana, 17 July 1968). He was the most outstanding composer of trova songs, and his best have been sung and recorded many times. Perla marina, Adiós a La Habana, Mujer bayamesa, El huracán y la palma, Guarina and many others are now part of Cuba's heritage. Garay was also musically illiterate – in fact, he only taught himself the alphabet at 16 – but in his case not only were scores recorded by others, but there are recordings as well.

In the 1890s Garay got involved in the Cuban War of Independence, and decided a stay in Hispaniola (Haiti and Dominican Republic) would be a good idea. It was, and he came back with a wife. Garay settled in Havana in 1906, and in 1926 joined Rita Montaner and others to visit Paris, spending three months there singing his songs. He broadcast on radio, made recordings and survived into modern times. He used to say "Not many men have shaken hands with both José Martí and Fidel Castro!" Carlos Puebla, whose life spanned the old and the new trova, told a good joke about him: "Sindo celebrated his 100th birthday several times – in fact, whenever he was short of money!"

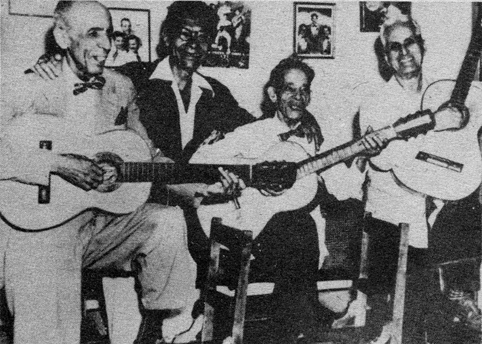
The four greats of the trova from left: Rosendo Ruiz, Manuel Corona Sindo Garay, Alberto Villalón

José 'Chicho' Ibáñez (Corral Falso, 22 November 1875 – Havana, 18 May 1981) was the first trovador (that we know of) to specialize in the son and also on guaguancós and afrocuban rhythms from the abakuá. He played the tres rather than the Spanish guitar, and developed his own technique for this Cuban guitar. During his extremely long career, Chicho sang and played the son in streets, plazas, cafés, nightclubs and other venues throughout Cuba. In the 1920s, when the sextetos became popular, he was forced to sell his compositions to these larger groups and their composers in order to survive. His compositions include Toma, mamá, que te manda tía, Evaristo, No te metas Caridad, Ojalá (sones); Yo era dichoso, Al fin mujer (bolero-sones); Qué más me pides, La saya de Oyá (guaguancós). He worked throughout Cuba, and latterly a short film was made of him ('See also' below).

The composer Rosendo Ruiz (Santiago de Cuba, 1 March 1885 – Havana, 1 January 1983) was a trovador almost as long-lived as Ibáñez and Garay. He wrote the criolla Mares y Arenas in 1911, the workers' anthem Redención in 1917, the bolero Confesión, the guajira Junto al cañaveral and the pregón-son Se va el dulcerito. He was the author of a well-known guitar manual.

Manuel Corona (Caibarién, 17 June 1880 – Havana 9 January 1950) started his career in a red-light district of Havana. Originally a singer-guitarist, he became a prolific composer after his hand was damaged by a pimp's knife. It was a case of "She was a whore, and she had her man, but I loved her". Alberto Villalón (Santiago de Cuba, 7 June 1882 – Havana 16 07 1955) advanced the trova guitar technique and had a hand in the birth of the son septetos.

Garay, Ruiz, Villalón and Corona were known as the four greats of the trova, but Ibáñez and the following trovadores should be regarded as of equally high stature.

== The 20th century ==
Patricio Ballagas (Camagüey, 17 March 1879 – Havana, 15 February 1920); Eusebio Delfín (Palmira, 1 April 1893 – Havana, 28 April 1965); María Teresa Vera (Guanajay, 6 February 1895 – Havana, 17 December 1965); Lorenzo Hierrezuelo (El Caney, 5 September 1907 – Havana, 16 November 1993); Joseíto Fernández (September 5, 1908 – October 11, 1979); Ñico Saquito (Antonio Fernandez: Santiago de Cuba, 1901 – Havana, 4 August 1982); Carlos Puebla (Manzanillo, 11 September 1917 – Havana, 12 July 1989) and Compay Segundo (Máximo Francisco Repilado Muñoz: Siboney, 18 November 1907 – Havana, 13 July 2003) were all notable trova musicians. Also notable is Trío Matamoros, who worked together for most of their lives.

Most trovadors were creolized, drawing from both Spanish and African traditions and styles even-handedly. There were exceptions. Guillermo Portabales (Cienfuegos, 6 April 1911 – San Juan, Puerto Rico 25 October 1970) and Carlos Puebla were mostly in the guajiro (peasant) tradition, whilst El Guayabero – Faustino Oramas – (Holguín, 4 June 1911 – Holguín, 28 March 2007) was black and funky in style and content. He was the last of the old trova, the oldest working musician in Cuba, at 95, when he died. His double entendres were a joy.

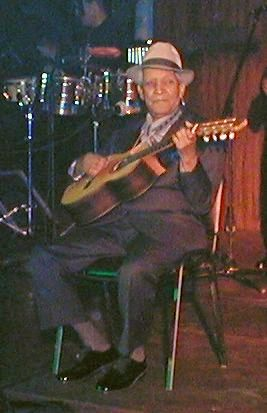
Compay Segundo at the Hotel Nacional de Cuba

Trova musicians often worked in pairs and trios, some of them exclusively solo (Compay Segundo). As the sextetos / septetos / conjuntos grew in popularity many trovadores joined in the larger groups.

The technique of guitar-playing gradually improved; the early trovadors, being self-taught, had rather limited techniques. Later, some tapped into classical guitar techniques to revive the accompaniment of the trova. Guyún (Vincente Gonzalez Rubiera, Santiago de Cuba, 27 October 1908–Havana, 1987) studied under Severino López, and developed a modern concept of harmony, and a way to apply classical technique to popular Cuban music. He became more adventurous, yet still in Cuban vein, and in 1938 stopped performing to devote himself to teaching the guitar. This bore fruit, and two generations of Cuban guitarists bear witness to his influence.

Perhaps the greatest guitarist amongst modern Cuban trovadors is Eliades Ochoa (b. Songo – La Maya, Santiago de Cuba, 22 June 1946), the leader of Cuarteto Patria. Ochoa learnt both Spanish guitar and the Cuban trés; Cuban composer and classical guitarist Leo Brouwer told him that he did not need to learn more about musical technique as he already knew too much! Ochoa plays now with an eight-stringed guitar (a self-designed hybrid of an acoustic six-string and the Cuban trés). Cuerteto Patría includes his brother Humberto Ochoa on guitar, son Eglis Ochoa on maracas, William Calderón on bass, Aníbal Ávila on claves and trumpet, and Roberto Torres on congas.

== Offshoots of the trova ==
The trova movement has given rise to offshoots which have grown in the fertile musical earth of Cuba and other Latin-American countries. The following are elements in the trova's great influence:

1. The huge number of lyric compositions which have been used in all areas of Latin-American popular music.
2. Unforgettable musical compositions which became latin standards.
3. The bolero, the musical form most closely associated with the trova, and its relative the canción.
4. The development of guitar technique in popular music.
5. Themes and initiatives related to politico-social events, such as Afrocubanismo, Filín (feeling), and Nueva trova.

=== Filin ===
The word is derived from feeling; it was a US–influenced popular musical fashion of the late 40s and the 50s. It describes a style of post-microphone jazz-influenced romantic song (crooning). Its Cuban roots were in the bolero and the canción. Some Cuban quartets, such as Cuarteto d'Aida and Los Zafiros, modelled themselves on U.S. close-harmony groups. Others were singers who had heard Ella Fitzgerald, Sarah Vaughan and Nat King Cole. Filín singers included César Portillo de la Luz, José Antonio Méndez, who spent a decade in Mexico from 1949 to 1959, Frank Domínguez, the blind pianist Frank Emilio Flynn, and the great singers of boleros Elena Burke and the still-performing Omara Portuondo, who both came from the Cuarteto d'Aida.

The filín movement, which originally had a place every afternoon on Radio Mil Diez, survived the first few years of the revolution quite well, but somehow did not suit the new circumstances and gradually withered, leaving its roots in jazz, romantic song and the bolero perfectly healthy. Some of its most prominent singers, such as Pablo Milanés, took up the banner of the nueva trova.

=== Nueva trova ===
The Cuban Nueva trova dates from the 1967/68, after the Cuban Revolution of 1959, and the consequent political and social changes. It differed from the traditional trova, not because the musicians were younger, but because the content was, in the widest sense, political. Nueva trova is defined, not only by its connection with Castro's revolution, but also by its lyrics. The lyrics attempt to escape the banalities of life (e.g. love) by concentrating on socialism, injustice, sexism, colonialism, racism and similar 'serious' issues. Silvio Rodríguez and Pablo Milanés became the most important exponents of this style. Carlos Puebla and Joseíto Fernández were long-time trova singers who added their weight to the new regime, but of the two only Puebla wrote special pro-revolution songs.

The regime gave plenty of support to musicians willing to write and sing anti-U.S. or pro-revolution songs; this was quite a bonus in an era when many of the traditional musicians were finding it difficult or impossible to earn a living. In 1967 the Casa de las Américas in Havana held a Festival de la canción de protesta (protest songs). Much of the effort was spent applauding causes that would annoy the U.S. government. Tania Castellanos, a filín singer and author, wrote ¡Por Angela! in support of Angela Davis. César Portillo de la Luz wrote Oh, valeroso Viet Nam. These were hot topics of the 1970s, but their topicality declined as time passed.

Though its initial popularity had already been dwindling, the fall of the Soviet Union represented something of a "nail in the coffin" for the Nueva trova. Throughout the 1990's, as artists such the Buena Vista Social Club found domestic and international prominence performing more traditional Cuban styles, tastes shifted back towards such styles. Further, the genre faded from relevancy as the themes it commonly explored were no longer considered "topical". Certain works, however, such as Puebla's Hasta siempre, sustain prominence due to critical success and continued thematic appeal.

== Other notables ==
The musicians featured here are a few notables amongst hundreds of excellent musicians living the same kind of life. No complete list exists, though the musicians listed below have been mentioned in at least one source. After the name, one or two of their best compositions are noted:

- Salvador Adams ("Me causa celos")
- Ángel Almenares ("Por qué me engañaste?")
- José (Pepe) Banderas ("Boca roja")
- Emiliano Blez Garbey ("Besada por el mar")
- Julio Brito ("Flor de ausencia")
- Miguel Companioni ("Mujer perjura")
- Juan de Dios Hechavarria ("Mujer indigna", "Tiene Bayamo", "Laura")
- José (Pepe) Figarola Salazar ("Un beso en le alma")
- Graciano Gómez Vargas ("En falso", "Yo sé de esa mujer")
- Rafael Gómez (a.k.a. Teofilito) ("Pensamiento")
- Oscar Hernández Falcón ("Ella y yo", "La Rosa roja")
- Ramón Ivonet ("Levanta")
- Eulalio Limonta
- Manuel Luna Salgado ("La cleptómana")
- Nené Manfugás
- Rafael Saroza Valdés ("Guitarra mía")

== Duos, trios, groups ==
During a career, a musician may work in many different line-ups. Because of the limited sonority of the guitar, trova musicians preferred small groups, or solo performances. Boleros tend to benefit from two voices, primo and segundo, giving to melodic phrases a richness in contrast with the basic rhythm of the cinquillo.

=== Duos ===
Guaronex y Sindo: Sindo Garay and his son.

Floro y Miguel: Floro Zorilla and Miguel Zaballa. Outstanding in their day.

Floro y Cruz: Floro Zorilla and Juan Cruz. Cruz was a terrific baritone.

Pancho Majagua y Tata Villegas: Francisco Salvo and Carlos Villegas.

María Teresa y Zequieira: María Teresa Vera and Rafael Zequeira.

Dúo Ana María y María Teresa: two female voices, Ana María García and Ma. Teresa Vera. Justa García also sang duo with each of these two women.

Lorenzo Hierrezuelo and María Teresa Vera.

José 'Galleguito' Parapar y Higinio Rodríguez.

Juan de la Cruz y Bienvenido León.

Manuel Luna y José Castillo.

Dúo Hermanos Enriso: Enrique 'Chungo' and Rafael 'Nené' Enriso.

Dúo Luna–Armiñan: Pablo Armiñan (primo) and Manuel Luna (segundo and guitar)

Dúo Pablito–Castillo: Pablo Armiñan (primo) and Augusto Castillo (segundo).

Dúo Pablito y Limonta: Pablo Armiñan (voz primo and guitar accompanist) and Juan Limonta (segunda, guitar and author). Extremely popular in Santiago de Cuba in the 1920s.

Dúo Juanito Valdés y Rafael Enriso.

Dúo Carbo–Quevedo: Pablo Quevedo (primo) and Panchito Carbó (segundo and guitar).

Dúo Hermanas Martí: Amelia and Bertha.

Dúo Sirique y Miguel: Alfredo 'Sirique' González and Miguel Doyble.

Los Compadres: Lorenzo Hierrezuelo, first with Compay Segundo, then with Rey Caney.

=== Trios ===
Trio Palabras: Vania Martinez, Liane Pérez, Nubia González.

== See also ==
- 1977 Del hondo del corazón. 20min film, Dir. Constante Diego. Figures of the traditional trova talk and sing.
- 1974 Chicho Ibáñez. 11min film, Dir. Juan Carlos Tabío. Short film on the trovador José 'Chicho' Ibáñez (1875–1981), who talks and sings at the age of 99.
