= Chalía Herrera =

Cuban soprano (1864–1948)

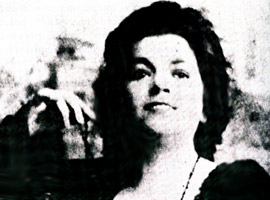
Chalía Herrera from her fingers dangle what might be castanets

Chalía Herrera, born Rosalía Gertrudis de la Concepción Díaz de Herrera y de Fonseca (17 November 1864, in Havana – 16 November 1948), was a Cuban soprano. She had the distinction of being the first Cuban musical artist to be recorded. She recorded, outside Cuba, numbers from the zarzuela Cádiz in 1898 on unnumbered Bettini cylinders. Much of her career was spent in Cuba, but she also sang in Mexico City, New York City, Milan, Caracas, Madrid and Barcelona.

Chalía studied singing with Angelo Massanet, then she went to New York to perfect her skills at the School of Opera and Oratorio of Emilio Agramonte. Later on she studied violin with Laureano Fuentes Matons in Santiago de Cuba. In 1895 she appeared in the Weber Hall in New York, performing to raise money for the Cuban War of Independence.
