= Jorge Anckermann =

Cuban pianist, composer and bandleader (1877–1941)

Jorge Anckermann (22 March 1877 – 3 February 1941) was a Cuban pianist, composer and bandleader. Havana-born, he started in music at eight with his father. At age ten he was able to substitute in a trio. In 1892, he went to Mexico as musical director of the bufo company of Nachos Lopez, visiting various Mexican states, and touring California.

== Biography ==
Anckermann lived in Mexico City for a number of years, teaching music. In Cuba, he was for many years the musical director of leading theatres. He composed and produced pieces for zarzuelas, reviews and comedies. He also composed boleros, and was apparently the originator of the guajira. The grand theatre Alhambra was the scene of his greatest hits, such as La isla de cotorras. Famous pieces include El arroyo que murmura; El quitrín; Flor de Yumurí; Un bolero en la noche.

His father, Carlos Anckermann, and his brother, Fernando Anckermann, were also prominent composers and musicians.
