= Septeto Nacional =

Cuban son group

Septeto Nacional (National Septet), or the Septeto Nacional de Ignacio Piñeiro, is a Cuban group credited with expanding the Son musical style before Arsenio Rodríguez. It added the trumpet to percussion, vocals, and strings. The group started as a sextet in 1927 in Central Havana. In 1929 it played at the Ibero-American Exposition in Sevilla, and in 1933, it was invited to the "Century of Progress" World Exposition in Chicago. In the same year, Lázaro Herrera took over the group when Ignacio Piñeiro left it for financial reasons; despite their success, the musicians earned very little. The group disbanded in 1937 but resumed playing for a recording session in 1940 and a television appearance in 1954. After the Cuban revolution of 1959, the group played again and is still playing. Its CD Poetas del Son was nominated for a Grammy in 2004.

== Discography ==
- Sin Rumba No Hay Son (2010)
- Desafiando al Destino
- Poetas del Son
- Clásicos del Son
- Mas Cuba Libres
- Havana Mood
- Hecho en Cuba
- Son Soneando
- Imperdonables
- 50 Aniversario
- El Son De Altura
- Entre Preciosas Palmeras
- Imperdonable
- Lejana Campiña
- Más Cuba Libres
- Son de la Loma
- Soneros De Cuba
