= Manuel Corona (musician) =

Cuban musician (1880–1950)

Manuel Corona Raimundo (17 June 1880, in Caibarién – 9 January 1950 in Marianao, Havana) was a Cuban trova musician, and a long-term professional rival of Sindo Garay.

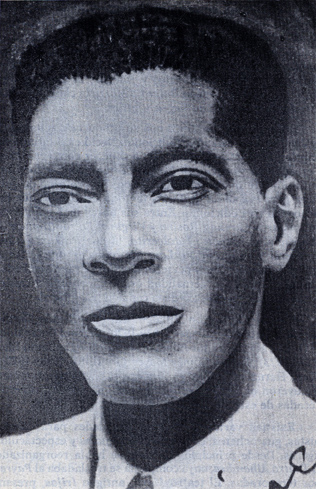
Manuel Corona one of the four greats of the trova

He came to Havana when the Cuban War of Independence broke out, and worked as a bootblack and a cigar-roller. His supervisor at the cigar factory taught him the guitar, and in 1905 he set up in a café in the red-light district of San Isidro. The district was controlled by the chulo (pimp) Alberto Yarini (1882–1910), who became famous for introducing French prostitutes (putas francesas) willing to perform more salacious acts than even the Cubans were used to. The francesas cut heavily into the profits of the Cuban putas, and the result was a gang war in which Yarini was killed.

Corona was present through all this, playing and singing to the punters, whores and pimps. He and one of the girls developed a love affair, and soon enough her pimp was on his trail. In a line that might have come from "Frankie and Johnny", Corona said later "She was a whore, and she had her man, but I liked her." The pimp came after him with a knife, and a cut to his hand prevented him playing the guitar again. From then on he lived from his compositions.

He wrote hundreds of compositions, some of them amongst the finest examples of Cuban sentiment, such as Mercedes, Longina, Santa Cecilia and Aurora. Guarachas such as El servicio obligatorio (National Service) and Acelera, Ñico, acelera were topical comments. La habanera was a deliberate reply to Garay's La bayamesa. Corona died in poverty.
