= Canción =

Genre of Latin American music

Canción ("song") is a popular genre of Latin American music, particularly in Cuba, where many of the compositions originate. Its roots lie in Spanish popular song forms, including tiranas, polos and boleros; also in Italian light operetta, French romanza, and the slow waltz. Initially, even when written by the creole population of Cuba, who opposed the ruling hierarchy, the music retained its European style of "intricate melodies, and dark, enigmatic and elaborate lyrics".

Later, in the latter part of the nineteenth century, the canción came under the influence of the trovador movement. This resulted in the lyrical expression of the feelings and aspirations of the population. The accompaniment of the guitar followed naturally, and the canción gradually fused with other forms of Cuban (and therefore Latin American) music such as the bolero. As a distinguishing mark, though, the canción never has the full-blooded Afro-Cuban percussion which marks so much Cuban popular music.

"Canción" means song in Spanish. In the Renaissance, the term was often used interchangeably with cantiga, cantar, canson, and sometimes villancico; it was related to the chanson of the Franco-Flemish school. Canción was the least specific term to cover all the popular, secular styles of vocal music of Spain at the time. In Spanish-language concerts and recordings, when the title of a particular song does not belong to a danceable genre (such as son in Cuba, or chacarera in Argentina), its genre is mentioned as "canción".

== See also ==
- Music of Cuba
- Nueva canción ("new song"), a Latin American movement of the 1960s
