= Sindo Garay =

Cuban trova musician (1867–1968)

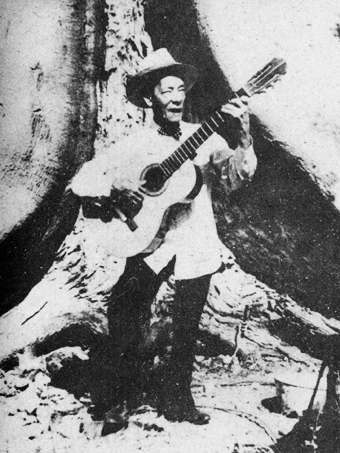
Sindo Garay

Antonio Gumersindo Garay García (12 April 1867 – 17 July 1968), known professionally as Sindo Garay, was a Cuban trova musician. He was taught by Pepe Sánchez. Garay was considered to be one of the four greats of the trova.

== Life & work ==
Garay a composer of trova songs, and his best have been sung and recorded many times. Perla marina, Adios a La Habana, Mujer bayamesa, El huracan y la palma, Guarina and many others are now part of Cuba's heritage. Garay was also musically illiterate – in fact, he only taught himself the alphabet at 16 – but in his case not only were scores transcribed by others, but there are recordings as well.

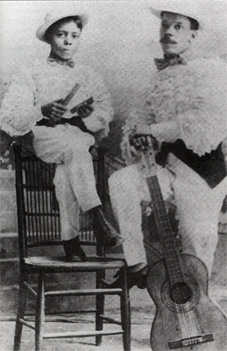
Guarionex and Sindo Garay, 1906

For a long period he sang in a duo with his eldest son Guarionex; he had two other sons and a daughter, and gave them all Indigenous names.

In the 1890s Garay got involved in the Cuban War of Independence, and decided a stay in Hispaniola (Haiti and Dominican Republic) would be a good idea. It was, and he came back with a wife. Garay settled in Havana in 1906, and in 1926 joined Rita Montaner and others to visit Paris, spending three months there singing his songs. He broadcast on radio, made recordings and survived into modern times. He used to say "Not many men have shaken hands with both Jose Marti and Fidel Castro!" Carlos Puebla, whose life spanned the old and the new trova, told a good joke about him: "Sindo celebrated his 100th birthday several times – in fact, whenever he was short of money!"
