= Bolero =

Genre of Hispanic music with Cuban origins

- Stylistic origins: Canción; trova
- Cultural origins: 1880s, Santiago de Cuba, Cuba

Fusion genres
- Bolero-son; bolero-cha; bolero-mambo

Regional scenes
- Cuba; Dominican Republic; Mexico; Puerto Rico; Spain; Vietnam

Bolero: identity, emotion and poetry turned into song
- UNESCO Intangible Cultural Heritage
- Country: Cuba and Mexico
- Reference: 01990
- Region: Latin America and the Caribbean

Inscription history
- Inscription: 2023 (18th session)
- List: Representative

Bolero is a music genre which originated in eastern Cuba in the late 19th century as part of the trova tradition. Unrelated to the older Spanish dance of the same name, bolero is characterized by sophisticated lyrics dealing with love. It has been called the "quintessential Latin American romantic song of the twentieth century".

Unlike the simpler, thematically diverse canción, bolero did not stem directly from the European lyrical tradition, which included Italian opera and canzone, popular in urban centers like Havana at the time. Instead, it was born as a form of romantic folk poetry cultivated by a new breed of troubadour from Santiago de Cuba, the trovadores. Pepe Sánchez is considered the father of this movement and the author of the first bolero, "Tristezas", written in 1883. Originally, boleros were sung by individual trovadores while playing guitar. Over time, it became common for trovadores to play in groups as dúos, tríos, cuartetos, etc. Thanks to the Trío Matamoros and, later, Trío Los Panchos, bolero achieved widespread popularity in Latin America, the United States and Spain. At the same time, Havana had become a fertile ground where bolero composers met to create compositions and improvise new tunes; it was the so-called filin movement, which derived its name from the English word "feeling". Many of the genre's most enduring pieces were written then and popularized in radio and cabaret performances by singers such as Olga Guillot and Elena Burke, backed by orchestras and big bands.

Boleros are generally in 4/4 time and, musically, compositions and arrangements might take a variety of forms. This flexibility has enabled boleros to feature in the repertoire of Cuban son and rumba ensembles, as well as Spanish copla and flamenco singers, since the early 20th century. Occasionally, boleros have been merged with other forms to yield new subgenres, such as the bolero-son, popular in the 1930s and 1940s, and the bolero-cha, popular in the 1950s. In the United States, the rhumba ballroom dance emerged as an adaptation of the bolero-son in the 1930s. Boleros can also be found in the African rumba repertoire of many artists from Kinshasa to Dakar, due to the many bolero records that were distributed to radios there as part of the G.V. Series.

The popularity of the genre has also been felt as far as Vietnam, where it became a fashionable song style in South Vietnam before the Fall of Saigon in 1975 and remains popular with the Vietnamese.

== History ==
=== Origins ===
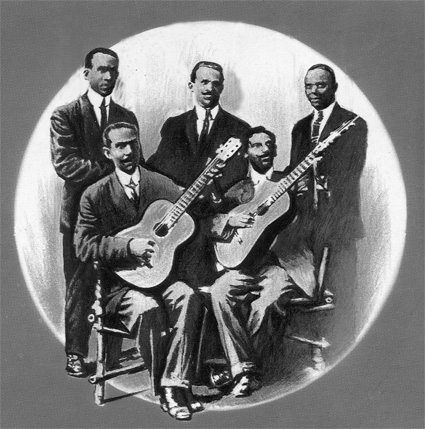
Pepe Sánchez (guitar, left) and Emiliano Blez (tres) with three singers (standing)

Bolero Artistas para la Habana, sung by Emilio Cabello. Spain, 1910.

In Cuba, the bolero was perhaps the first great Cuban musical and vocal synthesis to win universal recognition. In 2/4 time, this dance music spread to other countries, leaving behind what Ed Morales has called the "most popular lyric tradition in Latin America."

The Cuban bolero tradition originated in Santiago de Cuba in the last quarter of the 19th century; it does not owe its origin to the Spanish music and song of the same name. In the 19th century there grew up in Santiago de Cuba a group of itinerant musicians who moved around earning their living by singing and playing the guitar.

Pepe Sanchez is known as the father of the trova style and the creator of the Cuban bolero. Untrained, but with remarkable natural talent, he composed numbers in his head and never wrote them down. As a result, most of these numbers are now lost, but two dozen or so survive because friends and students wrote them down. He was the inspiration and model for the notable trovadores who followed.

=== Spread in Latin America ===
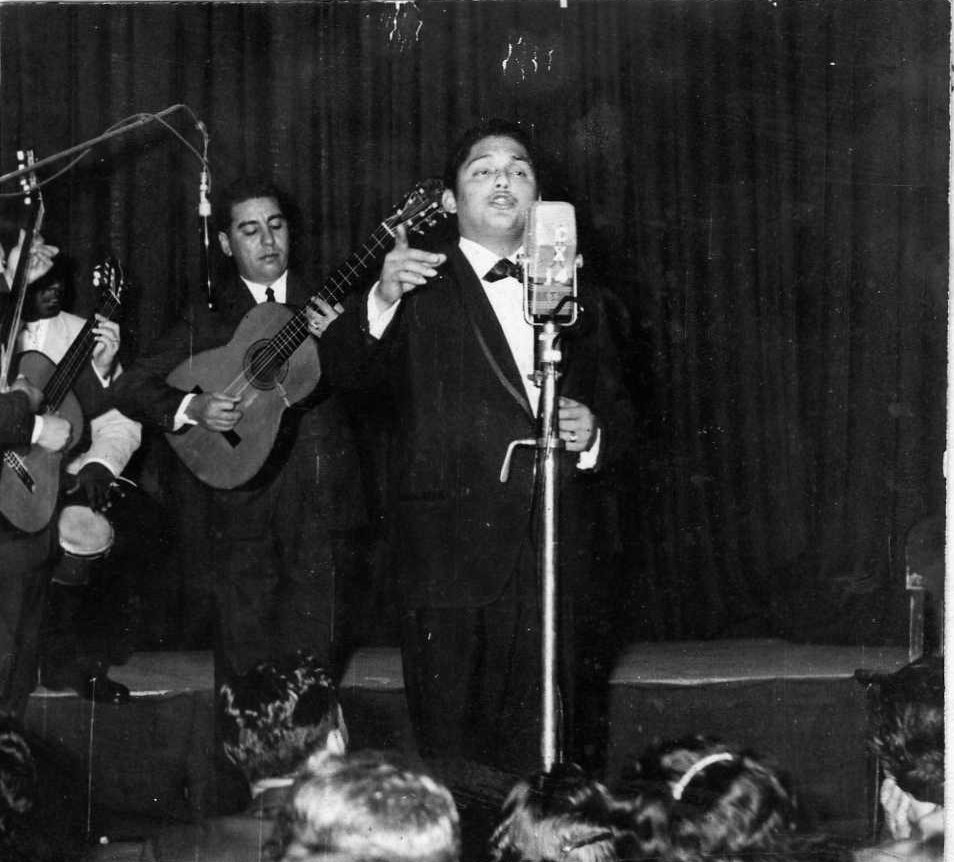
Julio Jaramillo, a prolific Ecuadorian bolero singer and recording artist who performed throughout Latin America.

Generic instrumental bolero, with characteristic Peruvian cajón percussion.

The bolero was first recorded in the east of Cuba in the year 1905 was "La Dorila" by the tenor Adolfo Colombo, thanks to trovador Sindo Garay, who had previously brought the criolla to Cuba in 1895, giving rise to a lasting interchange of lyrical styles between both islands. In the early 20th century the bolero reached Puerto Rico and Mexico, where it was popularized by the first radio stations around 1915. In Mexico, the genre became an essential component of the thriving trova yucateca movement in Yucatán alongside other Cuban forms such as the clave. It leading exponent was Guty Cárdenas.

By the 1930s, when Trío Matamoros made famous their mix of bolero and son cubano known as bolero-son, the genre was a staple of the musical repertoire of most Latin American countries. In Spain, Cuban bolero was incorporated into the copla repertoire with added elements from Andalusian music, giving rise to the so-called bolero moruno, made famous by composers such as Carmelo Larrea and Quintero, León y Quiroga.

Some of the bolero's leading composers have come from nearby countries, as in the case of the prolific Puerto Rican composer Rafael Hernández and the Mexican composers: Juan Gabriel, Agustín Lara and María Grever. Some Cuban composers of the bolero are primarily considered trovadores. Several lyric tenors also contributed to the popularization of the bolero throughout North and South America during the 1930s and the 1940s through live concerts and performances on international radio networks such as La Cadena de las Americas. Included in this group were the Mexican operatic tenors: Juan Arvizu and Nestor Mesta Chayres. Their collaborations in New York City with such musicians as Alfredo Antonini, Terig Tucci, Elsa Miranda and John Serry Sr. on the CBS radio show Viva América also introduced the bolero to millions of listeners throughout the United States. Also noteworthy during the 1940s and 1950s were the performances of Trio Los Panchos, which featured the artistry of musicians from Mexico and Puerto Rico including: Chucho Navarro, Alfredo Gil Hernando Avilés and Miguel Poventud. Boleros saw a resurgence in popularity during the 1990s when Mexican singer Luis Miguel was credited for reviving interest in the bolero genre following the release Romance.

== Bolero fusions ==
Bass line of bolero.

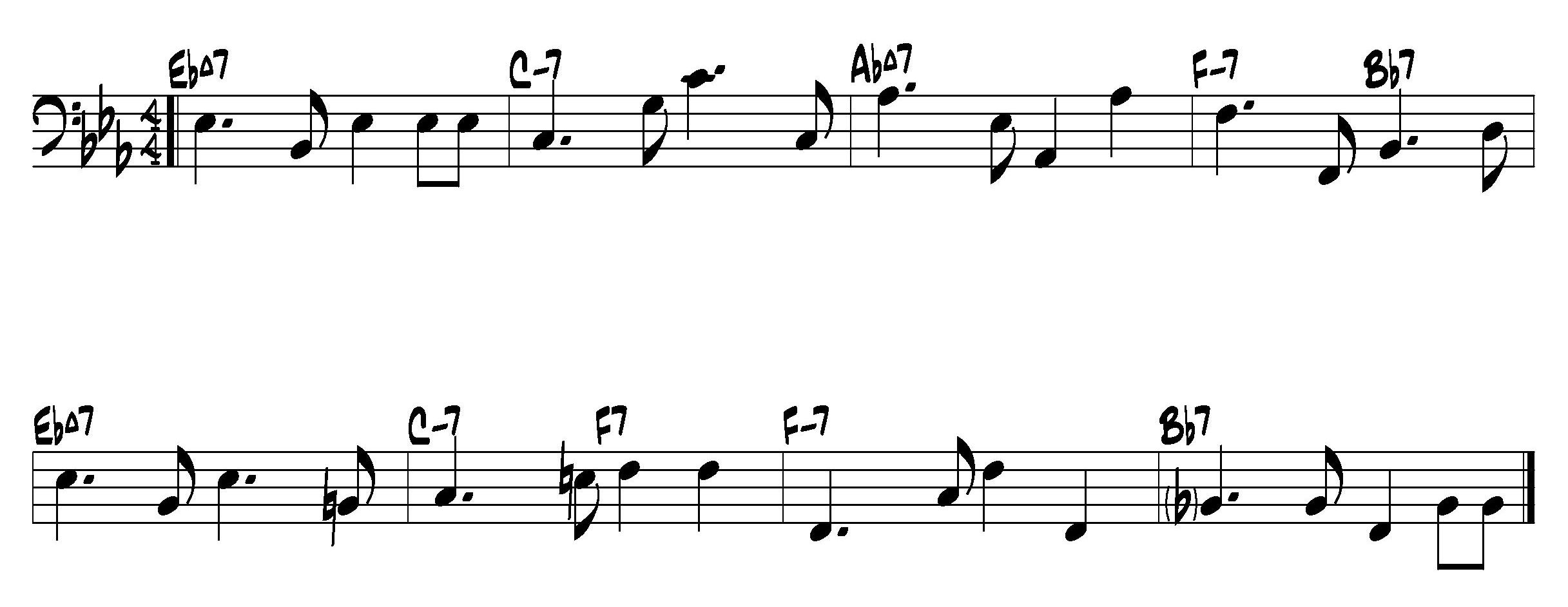
Typical rhythmic and harmonic pattern of bolero bass lines.

José Loyola comments that the frequent fusions of the bolero with other Cuban rhythms is one of the reasons it has been so fertile for such a long period of time:

"La adaptación y fusión del bolero con otros géneros de la música popular bailable ha contribuido al desarrollo del mismo, y a su vigencia y contemporaneidad."

(The adaptation and fusion of the bolero with other types of popular dance music has contributed to their development, and to its endurance and timelessness.)

This adaptability was largely achieved by dispensing with limitations in format or instrumentation, and by an increase in syncopation (so producing a more afrocuban sound). Examples would be:

- Bolero in the danzón: the advent of lyrics in the danzón to produce the danzonete.
- The bolero-son: long-time favourite dance music in Cuba, captured abroad under the misnomer 'rumba'.
- The bolero-mambo in which slow and beautiful lyrics were added to the sophisticated big-band arrangements of the mambo.
- The bolero-cha, 1950s derivative with a chachachá rhythm.

The lyrics of the bolero can be found throughout popular music, especially Latin dance music.

== Vietnam ==
Bolero music has also spread to Vietnam. In the 1930s, the nation grew fond of modern music, which combined Western elements with traditional music. Vietnamese bolero is generally slower tempo compared to Hispanic bolero, and is similar in style to Japanese enka and Korean trot. Such music was romantic, expressing concepts of feelings, love, and life in a poetic language; this predisposition was hated by Viet Minh, who strived towards shaping the working class at the time.

This genre became colloquially known as yellow music, in opposition to the nhạc đỏ (red music) endorsed by the Communist government of Hanoi during the era of the Vietnam War. As a result of North Vietnam winning the war, the music was banned in 1975. Those caught listening to yellow music would be punished, and their music confiscated. After the Fall of Saigon, many Vietnamese migrated to the United States, taking their music with them. The ban was lightened in 1986, when love songs could be written again, but by then the music industry was killed.

The government of Vietnam also prohibited the sale of overseas Vietnamese music, including variety shows like Asia and Paris by Night. In recent years however, bolero had grown popular again, as more overseas singers performed in Vietnam. Additionally, singing competition television series like Boléro Idol have grown popular, with singers performing songs, including songs formerly banned.

== Ballroom dance ==
=== International ballroom ===
A version of the Cuban bolero is danced throughout the Latin dance world (supervised by the World Dance Council) under the misnomer "rumba", often spelled "rhumba". This came about in the early 1930s when a simple overall term was needed to market Cuban music to audiences unfamiliar with the various Cuban musical terms. The famous "Peanut Vendor", actually a son-pregón, was so labelled, and the label stuck for other types of Cuban music.

In Cuba, the bolero is usually written in 2/4 time, elsewhere often 4/4. The tempo for dance is about 120 beats per minute. The music has a gentle Cuban rhythm related to a slow son, which is the reason it may be best described as a bolero-son. Like some other Cuban dances, there are three steps to four beats, with the first step of a figure on the second beat, not the first. The slow (over the two beats four and one) is executed with a hip movement over the standing foot, with no foot-flick.

=== American Rhythm ===
The dance known as bolero is one of the competition dances in American Rhythm ballroom dance category. The first step is typically taken on the first beat, held during the second beat with two more steps falling on beats three and four (cued as "slow-quick-quick"). In competitive dance the music is in 4/4 time and will range between 96 and 104 bpm. This dance is quite different from the other American Rhythm dances in that it not only requires cuban motion but rises and falls such as found in waltz and contra body movement. Popular music for this dance style need not be Latin in origin. Lists of music used in competitions for American Rhythm Bolero are available.

== See also ==
- Canción sentimental mexicana
- Cuplé
- Latin ballad
- Latin pop
