= Julio Brito =

Cuban musician (1908–1968)

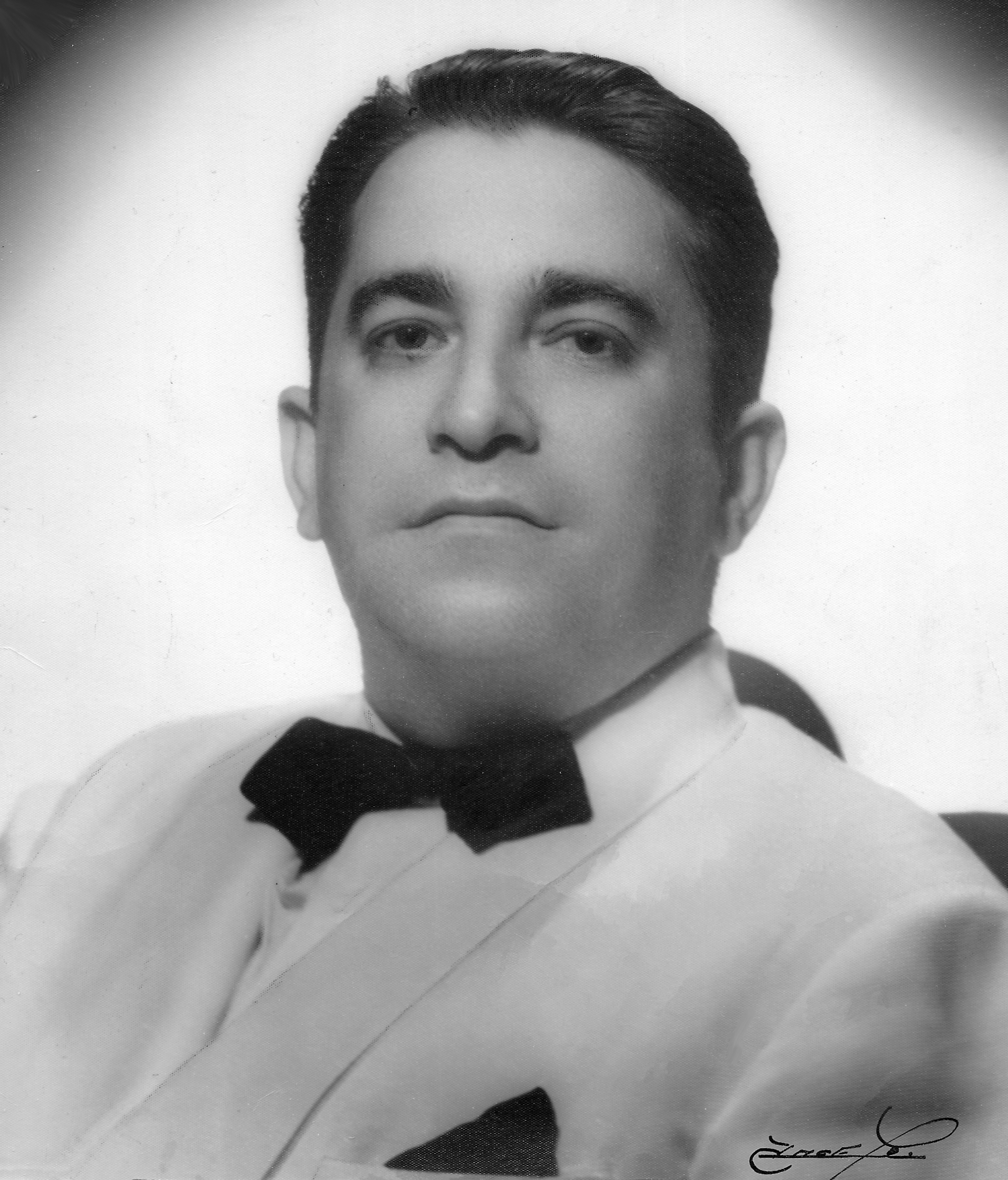
- "The melodic painter of Cuba"
- Born: Julio Valdés-Brito Ibáñez; January 21, 1908; Havana, Cuba
- Died: July 30, 1968 (aged 60); Havana, Cuba
- Occupations: Composer; Arranger; Orchestra conductor; Singer
- Known for: Musical composition
- Notable work: Mira que eres linda; El amor de mi bohío; Acurrucadita; Flor de ausencia; Cuando te acuerdes de mí
- Spouse: Antonia Gamba Cabrera
- Children: Julio Valdés-Brito Gamba; Alfredo Valdés-Brito Gamba; Alma Santa Valdés-Brito Gamba
- Parent(s): Alfredo Valdés-Brito; Julia Ibáñez
- Musical career
- Origin: Cuba, Havana
- Genres: Bolero; Guajira; Singer-songwriter; Cuban music
- Instruments: Drums; Guitar; Vibraphone; Piano; Sax; Voice
- Works: See the Discography section of this article.
- Years active: 1924–1968
- Labels: RCA Victor; DECCA; Peerless; Columbia; Panart; Universal Artist; Compañía del Gramófono Odeon; Discos REGAL; Southern Music Española; PeerMusic; Universal Music Group; Sony Music; Mushroom Pillow
- Formerly of: Orquesta Siboney

Notes
- Related artists: Antonio Machín; Pedro Vargas; Raphael; Los Panchos; Carlos Sadness; Virginia Maestro; Najwa Nimri; Alfredo Brito Ibáñez; Julio Brito Jr.; Alfredo Brito; Alvan Brito

Julio Brito was a Cuban musician, composer, orchestra conductor and singer. He achieved great popularity both in his native Cuba and internationally, thanks to compositions such as the guajira "El amor de mi bohío" or the world famous bolero "Mira que eres linda", interpreted by numerous artists around the world, even today. His way of describing the Cuban landscapes and his very careful lyrics earned him the nickname of "The melodic painter of Cuba".

== Biography ==
Julio Brito (Julio Valdés-Brito Ibáñez) was born in Havana (Cuba) on January 21, 1908. From his earliest childhood he showed great aptitude for music.

He studied music with Pedro Sanjuán (1887-1976), a famous Spanish musician and teacher, who gave him an excellent musical education.

In 1924, at the age of 16, he joined Don Azpiazu's orchestra as a saxophonist, a very successful orchestra on the island of Cuba.

In addition to the saxophone, he learned to play the guitar, drums, vibraphone, piano and studied conducting, an art in which he remained for most of his musical life.

Julio also learned to sing professionally, which allowed him to perform his compositions himself. He recorded his songs for different record labels, among others RCA Victor. Some recordings for RCA were made on the CMQ channel in Havana, in the program "Buenas noches, mi amor", where he performed.

Maestro Brito was one of the first conductors of Cuban radio, which began broadcasting in 1922, performing on PWX (founded by the Telephone Company of Cuba) and conducting for RHC-Cadena Azul, specifically for CMBF Radio Universal, which was located at 159 Prado Street in Havana.

He also conducted his orchestra at nightclubs in Havana, such as the "Cabaret Parisien" of the Hotel Nacional, the Casino Nacional, the Casino de La Playa, the Casablanca and the Encanto Theater.

In the United States, he performed in Hollywood for Max Factor.

In the 1940s he was President of the Society of Authors of Cuba and of the National Federation of Authors of Cuba.

=== The Siboney Orchestra ===
In the early 1930s, together with his brother, musician and orchestra conductor Alfredo Brito, Julio Brito founded and formed part of the Siboney Orchestra, in which he participated as saxophonist, drummer, guitarist and singer.

The Siboney Orchestra made the first broadcast of popular dance music from radio station CMC (formerly PWX), broadcast by the BBC chain of stations in London and by WEAF in New York City on November 14, 1931.

In 1932 the Siboney Orchestra toured Europe, performing in Spain, France and Portugal in the company of the Trio Matamoros, the Spanish dancer "Granito de Sal" and the rumbera Yolanda González. On August 8, 1932 they embarked for Spain aboard the steamship "Reina del Pacífico". The news of the Diario de la Marina highlighted on the eve of their departure that "...they will disembark in Santander and tour the main cities of that Republic".

In Spain the debut took place at the Salón Victoria, in Santander, on Sunday, August 21, 1932. The newspaper El Cantábrico, narrates the impact of the so-called Orquesta Típica Siboney, the Trío Matamoros and the dancers, Yolanda González and the Spanish "Granito de Sal". They also performed at the Teatro Iris, in Ávila, where the press described the Siboney and the Trío Matamoros as "among the best in their genre". In Oviedo, they perform at the Teatro Novedades. In September 1932 they performed at the Circo Price, in Madrid.

During this tour Julio joined the SGAE and recorded some songs with his voice, together with the Siboney Orchestra, for the Spanish label Regal. In November 1932, the Madrid newspaper La Libertad announces two records by Alfredo Brito and the Siboney Orchestra with the Regal label: DK8.714 "En el silencio de la noche" (author: Abelardo Barroso) and "La dichosa suegra" (by Julio Brito) and DK 8.715 "Adiós chamaquita" (Julio Brito) and "El panquelero" (Abelardo Barroso).

In France they performed at the Montmartre, the Ambassador and the Empire. They perform with Maurice Chevalier.

The Siboney Orchestra was an immediate success. It was one of the first Cuban orchestras to triumph in the Old Continent.

==== Julio Brito "The melodic painter of Cuba" ====
During the decades from 1920 to 1940, Julio developed an intense activity as a composer, creating songs that would become very popular all over the world.

His first known songs were "Tus lágrimas" and "Florecita". In 1931, his song "Ilusión china" made him very popular.

Somewhat later, in the 1930s, he composed "Mira que eres linda", a classic bolero recorded by great interpreters, even today.

The time when he composed "Mira que eres linda" coincided with the boom of the radio. In the Cuban capital, there was a succession of programs in which the most renowned singers and the most prestigious orchestras performed live. In a short time, that bolero became very popular. And when it was recorded, boleristas from other Hispanic countries included it in their repertoire.

—
Manuel Román – "Bolero de amor" (Historias de la canción romántica). Editorial Milenio, 2015.

Some performers who have recorded versions of this bolero by Julio Brito: Pedro Vargas, Antonio Machín, Raphael, Alfredo Sadel, Virginia Maestro, Carlos Sadness, Najwa Nimri, etc. (see Discography)

From this period are also his creations: “Acurrurrucadita”, “Trigueñita”, “Flor de ausencia” (great success in the voice of Panchito Riset), "Si yo pudiera hablarte" or "Cuando te acuerdes de mí", song that Tito Gómez interpreted at the age of 17 (1937), in his radio debut in "La Corte Suprema del Arte", Cuban radio contest destined to the discovery of new talents of which he would turn out to be winner.

Julio Brito is known as “The melodic painter of Cuba”, for having been one of the musical authors who most beautifully described the Cuban countryside in his songs. He was the creator of the "guajira de salón", providing peasant music with magnificent orchestrations.

Among the many compositions he dedicated to the Cuban countryside are “Rinconcito criollo”, “Serenata guajira”, “Allá en mi finquita”, “Oye mi guitarra”, “Amor Siboney”, and what would become one of his most famous creations: “El amor de mi bohío", which Julio premiered in 1937 at the Eden Concert cabaret in Havana.

The great success achieved by this guajira by Julio Brito is reflected in the words of René Cabel, in an interview conducted by Don Galaor for Bohemia magazine, on June 9, 1940 (page 54)

Question:

In which song could we situate the culminating moment of this evolution towards what is typically ours?

— Don Galaor - Bohemia, June 9, 1940 (page 54).

Answer:

Place it, without discussion, in the appearance of 'El amor de mi Bohío', by Julio Brito, whose formidable success gave the guideline to follow to the other authors, even to the old consecrated ones.

— René Cabel – Bohemia, June 9, 1940 (page 54).

Some performers who have recorded versions of "El amor de mi bohío": Pedro Vargas, Guillermo Portabales, Juan Legido, Trío Matamoros, Tito Gómez with the Orquesta Riverside, Los Panchos, Xiomara Alfaro, Omara Portuondo, Tito Puente, Olga Guillot, Oscar Chávez, Barbarito Diez with the Antonio María Romeu's Orchestra, Jonah Jones. (see Discography)

==== Music for movies ====
Julio Brito composed music for several films. Among them it is worth mentioning:

- "Tam, Tam o El origen de la Rumba" (1938), in which he can be seen as a singer of the Siboney Orchestra, around minute 00:03:57 of the film. Note: After a private screening at the Fausto theater, Germinal Barral wrote in Bohemia: “Tam, Tam is in cinematography what the poem is in literature”.
- "It's a Date" (1938). Song “It happened in Kaloha". Lyrics in Spanish by Julio Brito.
- "Balalaika" (1939). Song "At the Balalaika". Lyrics in Spanish by Julio Brito.
- "Irene" (1940). Song "Alice blue gown". Lyrics in Spanish by Julio Brito.
- "Embrujo antillano" (1946), where Blanquita Amaro y María Antonieta Pons performed his song "¡Ay, cómo no!" as a duet, which can be heard at around minute 01:32:00 of footage.
- "El amor de mi bohío" (1947), film written and directed by Juan Orol, inspired by the popular love ballad created by Julio Brito. The song plays as the opening theme of the film, while the credits roll.
- "Una mujer de Oriente" (1950). In this film, among other compositions by Julio Brito, you can hear his song "Evocación al mar", performed by Rosa Carmina.
- "El campeón ciclista" (1956). This Mexican film, uses "El amor de mi bohío" as part of the soundtrack. At approximately minute 00:57:29 a fragment of the song can be heard. It is relevant to note that the scriptwriter uses "El amor de mi bohío" to identify the Cuban cycling team, which illustrates to what extent Julio Brito's creation is associated worldwide with the image of his native island.

==== Radio and television scripts ====
Julio Brito also wrote scripts for television and radio.

Well, it's true. I have written several scripts for television and radio. Some for musical shows and others of humorous type, which I have titled La Familia Paz. I have some proposals from several stations and channels, but so far nothing concrete. I wish those scripts had the same acceptance as my compositions.

—
Julio Brito – Avance, November 21, 1953.

== Discography ==
Some performers who have recorded versions of his songs:

=== Acurrucadita ===
- Pedro Vargas with the Alfredo Brito Orchestra (RCA Victor – 1941)
- René Cabel (Gema – 1941)
- Julio Brito (Robbins Music Company – 1942)
- Ramón Armengod (Decca – 1942)
- Orquesta Memo Salamanca (RCA Victor – 1956)
- Los Ruffino (Orfeón – 1958)
- Reinaldo Henríquez with Adolfo Gúzman's Orchestra (Fama – 1959)
- Orquesta Gamboa Ceballos (Columbia Records – 1960)
- César Costa (RCA Victor Mexicana, S.A. de C.V. – 1967)
- Bandolero (Hacienda Records – 2006)
- Orquesta Habana of Sosa and Cataneo (Musart-Balboa, a division of Concord Music Group, Inc. – 2011)
- Gregorio Barrios (Calle Mayor – 2016)
- Hawaiian Serenaders – Osvaldo Novarro and Jimmy Logan (Musical Box – 2016)
- Chuy Rocca (2020)
- Eduardo Erres (Trinchera Records – 2021)

==== Adiós chamaquita ====
- Julio Brito with Alfredo Brito and his Orquesta Siboney (Regal – 1932)

==== África ====
- Julio Brito - Arrangement: Alfredo Brito (Southern Music - 1931)
- Trío Matamoros (RCA Victor – 1934)
- Alberto Socarrás and the Orquesta Del Cubanacan – Bolero version (Columbia Records – 1935)
- Alberto Socarrás and the Orquesta Del Cubanacan – Rumba version (Columbia Records – 1935)

==== Allá en mi finquita ====
- Pedro Vargas (RCA Victor – 1944)

==== Amor Siboney ====
- Cuarteto Machín (RCA Victor – 1934)
- Los Compadres (OG Representaciones Discográficas, MAG – 1973)

==== ¡Ay, cómo no! ====
- Blanquita Amaro and Maria Antonieta Pons (film: "Embrujo antillano" – 1946)

==== Canción de amanecer ====
- Dúo Primavera – María Ciérvide and Georgina du Bouchet with the Fernando Mulens Ensemble (RCA Victor – 1940)
- Carlos Suárez with the Orquesta Cosmopolita (RCA Victor – 1940)
- Juanito Sanabria and Arturo Cortés (Decca – 1941)

==== Capricho de guajira n2 ====
- Conjunto Palmas y Cañas (Guamá – 1974)

==== Con mi penquito ====
- Los Violines de Pego (Teca Records – 1975)
- Evaristo Quintanales (Studio 3 – 1976)
- Ramón Velóz and Coralia Fernández (Integra – 1979)

==== Corazón esconde ====
- Orquesta Adolfo Guzmán with Pepe Reyes and Orlando de la Rosa (RCA Victor – 1949)

==== Cuando te acuerdes de mí ====
- Pedro Vargas with the Alfredo Brito Orchestra (RCA Victor – 1939)
- Barbarito Diez with the Antonio María Romeu Orchestra (Panart – 1958)
- Berto González (Discos Meca Suaritos – 2019)
- Rodrigo Prats with the Antonio María Romeu Orchestra (Golden Records – 2023)

==== Dame tu cariñito ====
- Pedro Vargas with the Julio Gutiérrez Orchestra (RCA Victor – 1949)

==== De corazón a corazón ====
- Pedro Vargas (RCA Victor – 1944)

==== Dichosa suegra ====
- Julio Brito with the Orchestra Siboney of Alfredo Brito (Regal – 1932)
- Septeto Nacional (RCA Victor – 1933)
- Jorge Gallarzo (Compañía del Gramófono Odeon – 1942)

==== El amor de mi bohío (Mi guajirita) ====
- Pedro Vargas with the Alfredo Brito Orchestra (RCA Victor – 1939)
- Orquesta Riverside (RCA Victor – 1939)
- Sexteto Columbia (Columbia Records – 1939)
- Perla Violeta Amado with José Morán and his Orchestra (Decca – 1939)
- Julio Flores (Varsity – 1939)
- Pepe Landeros (RCA Victor – 1940)
- Dúo Primavera – María Ciérvide and Georgina du Bouchet with the Orquesta Riverside (RCA Victor – 1940)
- Luis Roldán (Odeon – 1940)
- Kiko Mendive (RCA Victor – 1947)
- René Touzet (RCA Victor, Webster Hall Studios, New York – 1954)
- Antonio María Romeu and his Orquesta Gigante (Panart – 1955)
- Trío Matamoros (Martinez Vela – 1956)
- Abelardo Barroso (Calle Mayor – 1957)
- Dúo Cabrisas-Farach (Orfeón – 1957)
- Trio Avileño ( Columbia – 1957)
- Xiomara Alfaro (RCA – 1959)
- Lalo Montané (Peerless – 1959)
- Victor Ruiz (RCA Victor – 1959)
- Orestes Macías with the Orquesta Hermanos Castro (Corona – décadas de 1950 a 1960)
- Trio Nodarse (Orfeón – 1961)
- Julito Rodriguez and his Trio (Ansonia – 1962)
- Marco Antonio Muñíz (RCA Victor Mexicana – 1962)
- Guillermo Portabales (Gema Records – 1967)
- Rafael Hernández and Lorenzo González (Compañía del Gramófono Odeon – 1968)
- Leo Marini (Mrva – 1969)
- Orquesta de Música Moderna de Oriente (EGREM under Exclusive License to Sony Music Entertainment España – 1970)
- Senén Suarez and his Combo (Areito – 1971) / (EGREM under Exclusive License to Sony Music Entertainment España – 2018)
- Orquesta Sonora Santanera (Sony Music – 1972)
- Conjunto Caney (Movieplay – 1974)
- Los Fakires (Guamá – 1974)
- Los Violines de Pego (Teca Records – 1975)
- Oscar Chávez (Polydor Records – 1975)
- Sonora Matancera (Orfeón – 1975)
- Tito Puente (Craft Recordings, a division of Concord Music Group, Inc. – 1977)
- Fray Venard Kanfush with the Larry Godoy Orchestra (Vagabonds Records – 1978)
- José Antonio Méndez (Polydor Records – 1978)
- Juan Legido (GRC – 1978)
- Ramón Veloz and Coralia Fernandez with the Conjunto Típico De Saborit (Discolor Records – 1979)
- Roberto Torres (SAR Records – 1979)
- Aurelio Reinoso (Areito – 1980)
- Jesús Caunedo (SB Records – 1980)
- Ildefonso Acosta (Areito – 1981)
- Orquesta Cuerdas De Oro (Kubaney – 1982)
- Conjunto Cristal (Cristal Records – 1982)
- Armando Pico (Omoa – 1986)
- Los Heraldos Negros (Alegría Music Latino – 1987)
- Trio Caribe (Bertelsmann México – 1989)
- Olga Guillot (Musart-Balboa, a division of Concord Music Group, Inc. – 1991)
- Barbarito Diez with the Antonio María Romeu Orchestra (Musart-Balboa, a division of Concord Music Group, Inc. – 1996)
- Daniel Santos (Star Music – 1996)
- Fruko y sus Tesos (Discos Fuentes – 1996)
- Voces (Bis Music – 1996)
- Marvela Puerto Rico (Musart-Balboa, a division of Concord Music Group, Inc. – 1997)
- Omara Portuondo (EGREM under Exclusive License to Sony Music Entertainment España – 1997)
- Las Perlas del Son (Suavecito – 1999)
- Trío Servando Díaz (Craft Recordings., Distributed by Concord – 1999)
- Barbarito Torres - Canta Ibrahim Ferrer (Atlantic - 1999 / Pimienta Records - 2003 / Universal Music Latino - 2003)
- Trío Tesis (Winter & Winter – 2002)
- Trio Los Condes (Disco Hit Productions – 2003)
- Estrella Acosta (eStar Records – 2006)
- Carmela and Rafael (Musart-Balboa, a division of Concord Music Group, Inc. – 2008)
- Raquel Zozaya (Discos Fuentes – 2009)
- Trio Cuba (EGREM under Exclusive License to Sony Music Entertainment España – 2009)
- Beatriz Murillo (Musart-Balboa, a division of Concord Music Group, Inc. – 2010)
- Orquesta Habana of Sosa and Cataneo (Musart-Balboa, a division of Concord Music Group, Inc. – 2011)
- Tito Gómez (Caribe Sound – 2013)
- Los Indianos (Musart-Balboa, a division of Concord Music Group, Inc. – 2014)
- Los Tecolines (Peerless MCM SA de CV – 2014)
- Jonah Jones (Circulo Musical – 2015)
- Miguel Ojeda and his Guitarras Antillanas (Discos Fuentes – 2015)
- Ñico Membiela (Alegria Music Latino – 2015)
- Los Panchos (RHI bajo licencia THAI Records – 2017)
- Orquesta Enrique Jorrín (EGREM under Exclusive License to Sony Music Entertainment España – 2017)
- Orquesta Todos Estrellas (EGREM under Exclusive License to Sony Music Entertainment España – 2017)
- Manolo Fernández (Discos Meca Suaritos – 2019)
- José Alberto "El Canario" (Los Canarios Music | Distributed by La Oreja Media Group, Inc. – 2023)

==== El botecito ====
- Tito Guízar and Alfredo Cibelli with the Orquesta Victor (RCA Victor – 1940)
- Leonor Bustamante (Decca – 1940)
- Don Arres (Decca – 1940)

==== El manzanero ====
- Cuarteto Machín (RCA Victor – 1934)

==== En la Balalaika ====
- Ramón Armengod (Decca – 1940)

==== En una sola frase ====
Pending data: Song creation is on record, but recording data is missing.

==== Evocación al mar ====
- Rosa Carmina (Film: "Una mujer de Oriente" – 1950)

==== Flor de ausencia ====
- Cuarteto Caney (Columbia Records – 1937)
- Yoyo Casteleiro (Panart – 1956)
- Daniel Santos (Remo Records – 1966)
- Ramón Velóz and Coralia Fernández (Integra – 1979)
- Carlos Guerra Y Sus Arañas (Fonodisco – 1979)
- Panchito Riset (Sonus – 1980)
- Barbarito Diez (Produfon – 1981)
- Gilberto Aldanás with the Grupo Opalo's (Areito – 1981)
- Los Karachi (Siboney – 1982)
- Pablo Milanés and Adriano Rodríguez (Universal Music Spain, S.L.U. – 1986)
- Los Gofiones (Sono Isla – 1991)
- Caco Senante and Pablo Milanés (ANS Records – 1994)
- Vieja Trova Santiaguera (Virgin Records – 1998)
- Armando Garzón (Corason – 1999)
- Septeto Santiaguero (Picap – 2010)
- Pepe Ordas and Eduardo Sosa (UNICORNIO Producciones Abdala S.A. – 2017)

==== Florecita ====
Pending data: Song creation is on record, but recording data is missing.

==== Guajeito ====
- Orquesta Julio Gutiérrez with Israel del Piño (RCA Victor – 1949)
- Guillermo Portabales (Sonoro – 1956)
- Abelardo Barroso (Gone Records – 1957)

==== Indigna ====
- El Indio with the Orquesta Cosmopolita (Panart – 1954)

==== Ilusión china ====
- Julio Brito – Arrangement: Alfredo Brito (Southern Music – 1931)
- Cuarteto Machín (Tumbao – 1930)
- Orquesta Pedro Vía (RCA Victor – 1934)
- Ito Gilberto (Estudio de Grabaciones Acentejo – 1997)
- Orquesta Demon's Jazz (The Gramophon co. – 1933)

==== Lindísima mujer ====
- Julio Brito – Arrangement: Alfredo Brito (Southern Music – 1934)
- El Indio con la Orquesta Cosmopolita (Panart – 1954)

==== Me has dejado solo ====
- Johnny Rodríguez with José Morán and his Orchestra (Decca – 1939)

==== Mira que eres linda ====
- Antonio Machín (Compañía del Gramófono Odeon – 1947)
- Pedro Vargas (RCA Victor – 1948)
- Benny Moré (Columbia Records – 1948)
- Antonio "El Chaqueta" (Columbia Records – 1951)
- Henri Rossotti et son Orchestre Tropical – "Qu'elle Était Jolie" (I.L.D – 1951)
- Conjunto Casino (RCA Victor – 1955)
- Franco e i G 5 – "Bocca Troppo Bella" (Columbia – 1957)
- Alfredo Sadel (Sonus – 1959)
- Van Wood Quartet – "Bocca Troppo Bella" (Fonit – 1960)
- Pepe Reyes (Odeon – 1965)
- Luc Barreto (Belter – 1971)
- Emilio "El Moro" (Discophon – 1972)
- Ñico Membiela (Laza – 1976)
- Dandy Beltrán and his Combo (E&G Productions – 1977)
- Las Hermanas Mendoza (Dial Discos, S.A. – 1978)
- Pequeña Compañía (Movieplay – 1979)
- Luis Lucena (Belter – 1980)
- Trio Alma de America (CBS −1980)
- Armando Pico (Omoa – 1987)
- Oscar D'León (Universal Music Group – 1991)
- Los Albas (Marina Music Publishing SLU – 2002)
- Roberto Ledesma (Disco Hit Productions – 2004)
- Raphael (Sony Music – 2010)
- John Pazos and his Bolero Orchestra (YOYO USA, Inc. – 2011)
- Virginia Maestro (Industrias Bala – 2018)
- Carlos Sadness (Sony Music – 2020)
- Najwa Nimri (Mushroom Pillow – 2021)
- André Ekyan et son Orchestre (Odeon – year unknown)

Mora

- Julio Brito – Arrangement: Alfredo Brito (Southern Music – 1934)

Oración faunesca

- Julio Brito – Arrangement: Alfredo Brito (Southern Music – 1934)

==== Oye mi guitarra ====
- Rita Mª Rivero (Peer International Corporation - 1946)

==== Óyeme André ====
- Pepe "Joe Moro" and his Orquesta (Columbia – 1950)
- Bienvenido Granda and La Sonora Matancera (Seeco Records – 1952)

==== Pajarito carpintero ====
- Johnny Rodríguez and his Orquesta Stork Club (Columbia Records – 1940)
- Ramón Armengod (Decca – 1940)
- Dúo Primavera – María Ciérvide and Georgina du Bouchet with the Conjunto Fernando Mulens (RCA Victor – 1940)
- Cuarteto Vocal Orpheus (Odeon −1941)

==== Para ti viviré ====
Pending data: Song creation is on record, but recording data is missing.

==== Qué linda eres tú ====
- Felo Bergaza and Miguel De Gonzalo (Panart – 1947)
- Trío Urquiza (RCA Victor – 1948)
- Trío Guamaní (Alba Records – year unknown)

==== Rinconcito criollo ====
- Julio Brito (Robbins Music Company – 1940)
- Pedro Vargas with the Alfredo Brito Orchestra (RCA Victor – 1940)
- Hermanas Águila (RCA Victor – 1941)
- Juanito Sanabria (Decca – 1941)

==== Rumbalero ====
- Miguel de Gonzalo with the Julio Gutiérrez Orchestra (RCA Victor – 1949)

==== Serenata guajira ====
- Don Arres with Noro Morales and his Orchestra (Decca – 1934)
- Salvador García and Noe Fajardo (Peerless – 1944)

==== Si yo pudiera hablarte ====
- Panchito Riset (Scheib – 1933)
- Juan Arvizu (RCA Victor – 1936)
- Orquesta Pedro Vía (Columbia Records – 1937)
- Marimba Pan-Americana (RCA Victor – 1938)
- Lazaro Miguel (Hilargi Records – 1996)
- Orlando Vallejo (Caribe Sound – 2015)

==== Tan solo recordar ====
- René Cabel and the Alfredo Brito Orchestra (RCA Victor – 1943)

==== Te quiero tanto ====
- René Cabel and Rafael Hernandez with Alfredo Brito's Siboney Orchestra (RCA Victor – 1939)

==== Trigueñita ====
- Trio Matamoros (Columbia – 1930)
- Julio Brito – Arrangement: Alfredo Brito (Southern Music – 1932)
- Cuarteto Machín (RCA Victor – 1932)
- Chiquita Serrano, Oscar Calle and Firmín Jova with the Oscar Calle Orchestre Cubain (Columbia Records – 1933)
- Pedro Berríos and Enrique Bryón Cuban Orchestra (RCA Victor – 1933)
- Don Barreto Et Son Orchestre Cubain (Decca – 1933)
- Alfredo Brito and his Orquesta Siboney (Decca – 1935)
- Pérez Prado and Carlos Molina (Spinorama – 1964)
- Trio Taicuba (Areito – 1987)
- Aaron Gonzalez Orquesta (J.d.L. Records – 2023)

==== Tus lágrimas ====
- Nena Brito and Julio Brito with Alfredo Brito's Siboney Orchestra – (RCA Victor – 1931)

==== Yo odiarte quisiera ====
- Miguel de Gonzalo with the Julio Gutiérrez Orchestra (RCA Victor – 1949)

== Bibliography ==
- Díaz Ayala, Cristóbal (1981). Música Cubana (Del Areyto a la Nueva Trova) [Cuban Music (From Areyto to Nueva Trova)] (in Spanish). Editorial Cubanacan. ISBN 0897297032.
- Orovio, Helio (1981). Diccionario de la música cubana: biográfico y técnico [Dictionary of Cuban music: biographical and technical] (in Spanish). Editorial Letras Cubanas. ISBN 9591000480.
- Bitácora de Cine Cubano, Tomo I (La República 1897-1960) [Logbook of Cuban Cinema, Volume I (The Republic 1897–1960)] (in European Spanish). Agencia Española de Cooperación Internacional para el Desarrollo (AECID). 2018. ISBN 9788494835247.
- Román Fernández, Manuel (2015). "El bolero nació en Cuba (Bolero was born in Cuba)". Bolero de amor (Historias de la canción romántica) [Bolero of love (Stories of the romantic song)] (in European Spanish). Milenio Publicaciones. pp. 24–25. ISBN 9788497436656.
- Rico Salazar, Jaime (2000). Cien Anos De Boleros: Nueva Version Su Historia, Sus Compositores, Sus Mejores Interpretes Y 700 Boleros Inolvidables [One Hundred Years Of Boleros: New Version Its History, Its Composers, Its Best Performers And 700 Unforgettable Boleros] (in Spanish). Panamerican. ISBN 9789583314315.
- Galaor, Don (1943). Ellas y ellos al micrófono [Ladies and gentlemen at the microphone] (in Spanish). La Habana: Imprenta "Ninon".
- Ledón Sánchez, Armando (2023). La música popular en Cuba [Popular music in Cuba] (in Spanish). Ediciones El Gato Tuerto. p. 88. ISBN 9780932367150.
- Orovio, Helio (2004). Cuban Music from A to Z. Duke University Press Books. p. 36. ISBN 9780822331865.
- Lam, Rafael (2014). El imperio de la música cubana [The empire of Cuban music] (in Spanish). Jose Martí, La Habana. p. 105. ISBN 9789590905780.
- Galaor, Don (1939-08-13). "¡"Amor de mi Bohío" produjo a Julio Brito 40 centavos!" ["Amor de mi Bohío” earned Julio Brito 40 cents!]. Bohemia. pp. 44–46, 49, 51–52.
- Galaor, Don (1940-06-09). "RENE CABEL decapitó su apellido para facilitar su fama" [RENE CABEL beheaded his surname to facilitate his fame]. Bohemia. p. 54.
- Lagarde, Guillermo (1953-11-21). "Julio Brito habla sobre su obra y su vida en la prensa cubana" [Julio Brito talks about his work and life in the Cuban press.] (PDF). Diario Avance, la Habana, Cuba (Pág 45). (in Spanish): 4 (of the PDF).
