= El amor de mi bohío =

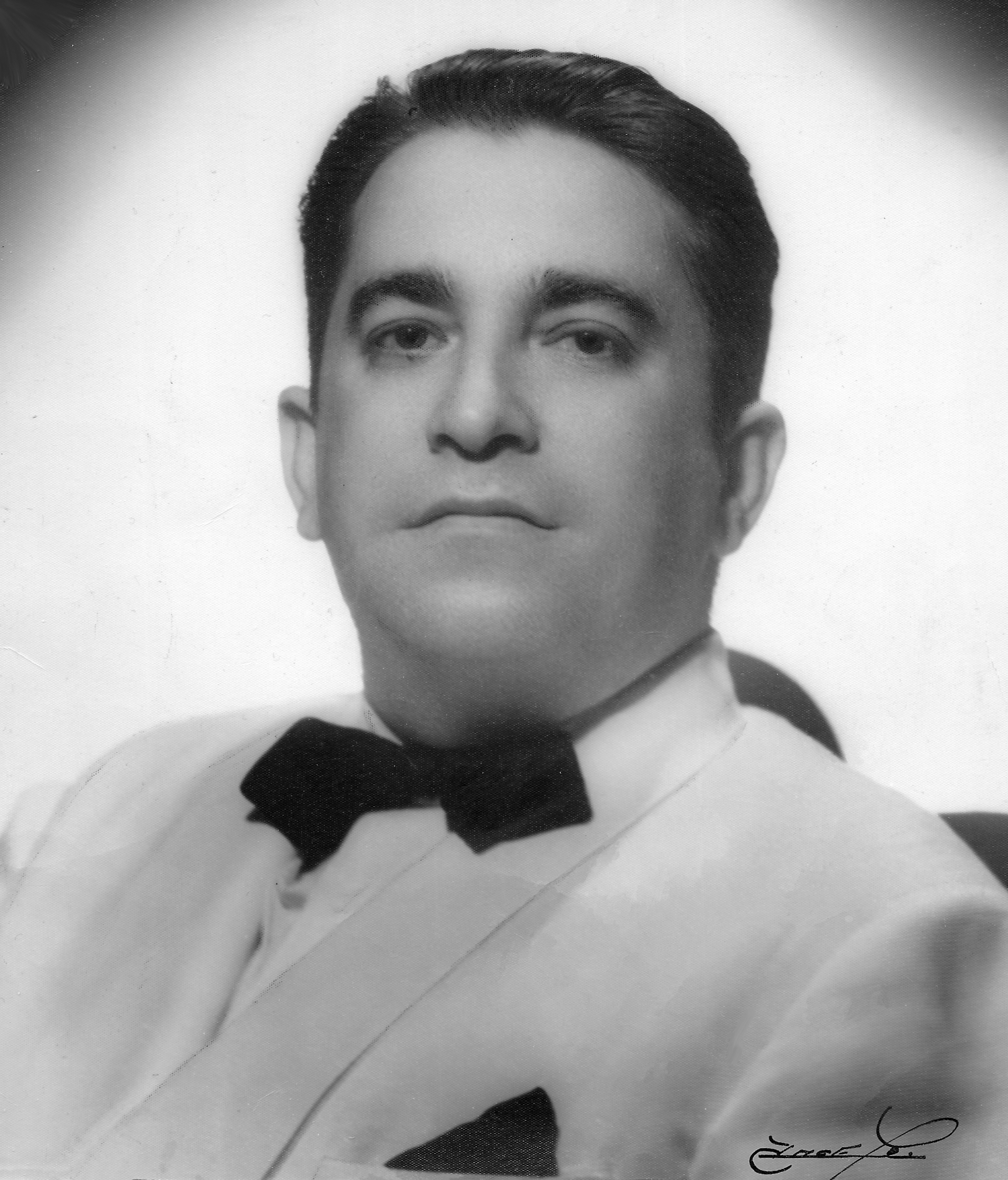

Song by Julio Brito
- Language: Spanish
- Written: 1930s
- Recorded: 1939
- Genre: Guajira
- Length: 2:30
- Songwriter(s): Julio Brito (Julio Brito Ibáñez)

Audio sample
- file; help

"El amor de mi bohío"(also known as "Mi guajirita") is a song composed, music and lyrics, in the 1930s, by the Cuban composer Julio Brito (Julio Valdés-Brito Ibáñez), known as “The melodic painter of Cuba” for having been one of the musical authors who most beautifully described the Cuban countryside in his songs.

== Thematic ==
The song describes a typical landscape of the Cuban countryside, while telling the story of a peasant in love, who must leave his hut and his wife to go to work the land.

The author describes the Cuban countryside:

Valley of the silver moon, path of my loves, I want to offer to the flowers the song of my montuna... It is all love, what reigns in my hut where the stillness of the river dreams...

He talks about the love he feels for his partner:

It's my life, a pretty little guajirita, the prettiest little thing, brunette... And when I wake up my pretty little guajirita, I leave a kiss on her little mouth that I adore...

He has to leave for work because it is dawn:

Once again the sun reminds me that the day in its fullness is already claiming...

He says goodbye to his wife:

Then you see, in the distance, the hut, and a little white hand that says goodbye to me.

== History ==
Brito premiered "El amor de mi bohío" in 1937, at the famous Eden Concert cabaret in Havana, Cuba. This song is the maximum expression of the Cuban salon guajira, the most widespread of this genre, which would become one of Julio Brito's most famous creations, being performed by great voices throughout the following decades.

The success achieved by this guajira by Julio Brito is reflected in the words of René Cabel, in an interview conducted by Don Galaor for Bohemia magazine on June 9, 1940 (page 54).

Question:

In which song could we situate the culminating moment of this evolution towards what is typically ours?

— Don Galaor - Bohemia, June 9, 1940 (p 54).

Answer:

Place it, without discussion, in the appearance of 'El amor de mi Bohío', by Julio Brito, whose formidable success gave the guideline to follow to other authors, even to the old consecrated ones.

— René Cabel - Bohemia, June 9, 1940 (p 54).

In an interview that Don Galaor did with the Brito brothers (Alfredo and Julio) in the Cuban magazine Bohemia in 1939, Alfredo comments that Julio finished the song thanks to his insistence that he do so.

This guajira by Julio Brito inspired Juan Orol, a Mexican filmmaker, to write the script for his film El amor de mi bohío (1947). The song plays as the film's opening theme, as the credits roll.

"El amor de mi bohío" is also part of films such as El campeón ciclista (1956). You can hear Brito's song at approximately minute 00:57:29 of the film. The screenwriter uses "El amor de mi bohío" to identify the Cuban cycling team, which illustrates the extent to which Brito's creation is associated worldwide with the image of his native island.

At the time of greatest popularity of “El amor de mi bohío”, the Cuban Society of Authors paid Julio Brito 40 cents in royalties. In Bohemia magazine, the journalist points out that all those involved in the diffusion of “the song that is most played, sung and danced today throughout Cuba and Mexico” charged for interpreting or diffusing it. All except the author:

There is no right! There is no right, because if the song is sung or interpreted in a radio program, the owner of the radio station charges the director of the hour, who has rented it, and the latter charges the advertiser or the advertisers. And the artist who sings it, charges the director of the hour, and the musician who accompanies it, charges the artist or the director himself. And the author, who is the first one who should be paid, goes through the embarrassment, the sad, miserable ordeal of being paid by the Society of Authors in the month of the highest peak of his song, forty cents! for property rights.

Faced with this waste, it occurs to me to ask: Why are songs made in Cuba? Because anywhere in the world, an author with a hit like “El amor de mi bohío', can live opulently for a year.

— Don Galaor - Bohemia, August 13, 1939 (p 51).

== Song recordings ==
Some artists who have recorded this guajira by Julio Brito include:

- Pedro Vargas with the Alfredo Brito Orchestra (RCA Victor - 1939)
- Orquesta Riverside (RCA Victor - 1939)
- Sexteto Columbia (Columbia Records - 1939)
- Perla Violeta Amado with José Morán and his Orchestra (Decca - 1939)
- Julio Flores (Varsity - 1939)
- Pepe Landeros (RCA Victor - 1940)
- Dúo Primavera - María Ciérvide and Georgina du Bouchet with the Orquesta Riverside (RCA Victor - 1940)
- Luis Roldán (Odeon - 1940)
- Kiko Mendive (RCA Victor - 1947)
- René Touzet (RCA Victor, Webster Hall Studios, New York - 1954)
- Antonio María Romeu and his Orquesta Gigante (Panart - 1955)
- Trío Matamoros (Martinez Vela - 1956)
- Abelardo Barroso (Calle Mayor - 1957)
- Dúo Cabrisas-Farach (Orfeón - 1957)
- Trio Avileño ( Columbia - 1957)
- Xiomara Alfaro (RCA - 1959)
- Lalo Montané (Peerless - 1959)
- Victor Ruiz (RCA Victor - 1959)
- Orestes Macías with the Orquesta Hermanos Castro (Corona - décadas de 1950 a 1960)
- Trio Nodarse (Orfeón - 1961)
- Julito Rodriguez and his Trio (Ansonia - 1962)
- Marco Antonio Muñíz (RCA Victor Mexicana - 1962)
- Guillermo Portabales (Gema Records - 1967)
- Rafael Hernández and Lorenzo González (Compañía del Gramófono Odeon - 1968)
- Leo Marini (Mrva - 1969)
- Orquesta de Música Moderna de Oriente (EGREM under Exclusive License to Sony Music Entertainment España - 1970)
- Senén Suarez and his Combo (Areito - 1971) / (EGREM under Exclusive License to Sony Music Entertainment España - 2018)
- Orquesta Sonora Santanera (Sony Music - 1972)
- Conjunto Caney (Movieplay - 1974)
- Los Fakires (Guamá - 1974)
- Los Violines de Pego (Teca Records - 1975)
- Oscar Chávez (Polydor Records - 1975)
- Sonora Matancera (Orfeón - 1975)
- Tito Puente (Craft Recordings, a division of Concord Music Group, Inc. - 1977)
- Fray Venard Kanfush with the Larry Godoy Orchestra (Vagabonds Records - 1978)
- José Antonio Méndez (Polydor Records - 1978)
- Juan Legido (GRC - 1978)
- Ramón Veloz and Coralia Fernandez with the Conjunto Típico De Saborit (Discolor Records - 1979)
- Roberto Torres (SAR Records - 1979)
- Aurelio Reinoso (Areito - 1980)
- Jesús Caunedo (SB Records - 1980)
- Ildefonso Acosta (Areito - 1981)
- Orquesta Cuerdas De Oro (Kubaney - 1982)
- Conjunto Cristal (Cristal Records - 1982)
- Armando Pico (Omoa - 1986)
- Los Heraldos Negros (Alegría Music Latino - 1987)
- Trio Caribe (Bertelsmann México - 1989)
- Olga Guillot (Musart-Balboa, a division of Concord Music Group, Inc. - 1991)
- Barbarito Diez with the Antonio María Romeu Orchestra (Musart-Balboa, a division of Concord Music Group, Inc. - 1996)
- Daniel Santos (Star Music - 1996)
- Fruko y sus Tesos (Discos Fuentes - 1996)
- Voces (Bis Music - 1996)
- Marvela Puerto Rico (Musart-Balboa, a division of Concord Music Group, Inc. - 1997)
- Omara Portuondo (EGREM under Exclusive License to Sony Music Entertainment España - 1997)
- Las Perlas del Son (Suavecito - 1999)
- Trío Servando Díaz (Craft Recordings., Distributed by Concord - 1999)
- Trío Tesis (Winter & Winter - 2002)
- Trio Los Condes (Disco Hit Productions - 2003)
- Estrella Acosta (eStar Records - 2006)
- Carmela and Rafael (Musart-Balboa, a division of Concord Music Group, Inc. - 2008)
- Raquel Zozaya (Discos Fuentes - 2009)
- Trio Cuba (EGREM under Exclusive License to Sony Music Entertainment España - 2009)
- Beatriz Murillo (Musart-Balboa, a division of Concord Music Group, Inc. - 2010)
- Orquesta Habana of Sosa and Cataneo (Musart-Balboa, a division of Concord Music Group, Inc. - 2011)
- Tito Gómez (Caribe Sound - 2013)
- Los Indianos (Musart-Balboa, a division of Concord Music Group, Inc. - 2014)
- Los Tecolines (Peerless MCM SA de CV - 2014)
- Jonah Jones (Circulo Musical - 2015)
- Miguel Ojeda and his Guitarras Antillanas (Discos Fuentes - 2015)
- Ñico Membiela (Alegria Music Latino - 2015)
- Los Panchos (RHI bajo licencia THAI Records - 2017)
- Orquesta Enrique Jorrín (EGREM under Exclusive License to Sony Music Entertainment España - 2017)
- Orquesta Todos Estrellas (EGREM under Exclusive License to Sony Music Entertainment España - 2017)
- Manolo Fernández (Discos Meca Suaritos - 2019)
- José Alberto "El Canario" (Los Canarios Music | Distributed by La Oreja Media Group, Inc. - 2023)

== Lyrics (Spanish) ==
Valle plateado de luna,

sendero de mis amores,

quiero ofrendarle a las flores

el canto de mi montuna.

Es mi vivir, una linda guajirita

la cosita más bonita, trigueña.

Es todo amor, lo que reina en mi bohío

donde a la quietud del río, se ensueña.

Al brotar la aurora sus lindos colores,

matiza de encanto mi nido de amores.

Y al despertar, a mi linda guajirita

dejo un beso en su boquita, que adoro.

De nuevo el sol, me recuerda que ya el día

en su plena lozanía, reclama.

Luego se ve, a lo lejos el bohío

y una manita blanca, que me dice adiós.

- Orquesta -

Al brotar la aurora sus lindos colores,

matiza de encanto mi nido de amores.

Y al despertar, a mi linda guajirita

dejo un beso en su boquita, que adoro.

De nuevo el sol, me recuerda que ya el día

en su plena lozanía, reclama.

Luego se ve, a lo lejos el bohío

y una manita blanca, que me dice adiós.

== Bibliography ==
- Orovio, Helio (1981). Diccionario de la música cubana: biográfico y técnico. Editorial Letras Cubanas. ISBN 9591000480.
- Galaor, Don (1939-08-13). "¡"Amor de mi Bohío" produjo a Julio Brito 40 centavos!". Bohemia.
- Galaor, Don (1940-06-09). "RENE CABEL decapitó su apellido para facilitar su fama". Bohemia.
- "Julio Brito habla sobre su obra y su vida en la prensa cubana" (PDF). Diario Avance, la Habana, Cuba (Pág 45). 1953-11-21.
