= Mira que eres linda =

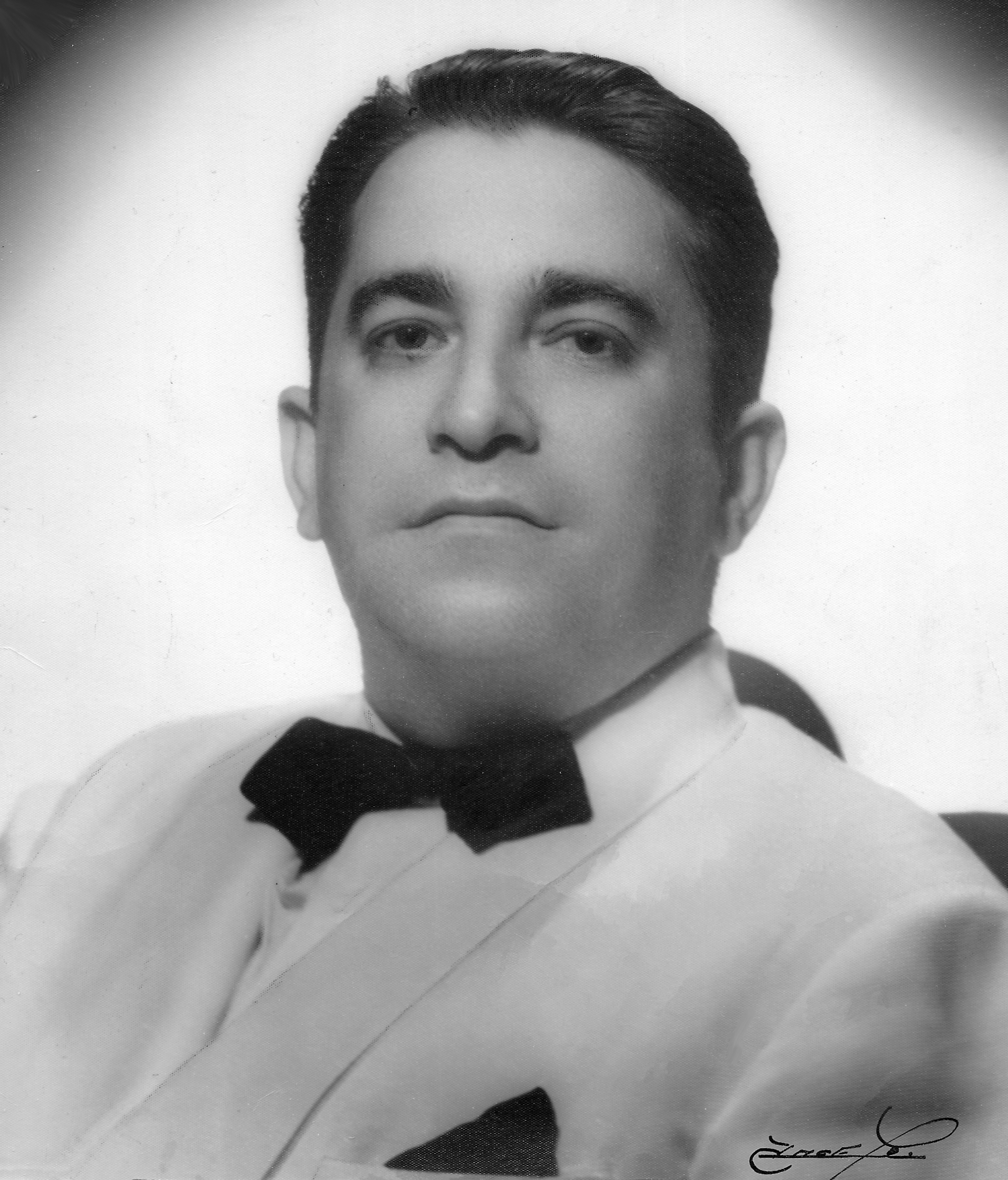

Song by Julio Brito
- Language: Spanish
- Written: 1930s
- Recorded: 1947
- Genre: Bolero
- Length: 2:30
- Songwriter: Julio Brito (Julio Brito Ibáñez)

Audio sample
- file; help

"Mira que eres linda" is a song composed, music and lyrics, in the 1930s, by the Cuban composer Julio Brito (Julio Valdés-Brito Ibáñez), known as "The melodic painter of Cuba".

== Thematic ==
"Mira que eres linda" is a deeply emotional love ballad, written by Brito in the 1930s and first recorded in 1947. The song is about a really beautiful woman, with eyes as big as suns, with a look always in love, whose beauty is only comparable to a rose that came from heaven, so beautiful that the author by her side feels close to God.

The author tells us about his eyes and his way of looking:

With those big eyes that look like suns, with that gaze, always in love, with which you look at...

He is overwhelmed by her beauty:

Being at your side, I truly feel closer to God....

He believes that such beauty can only come from heaven:

Because you are divine, so pretty and beautiful, that only a rose fallen from heaven would be like you....

== History ==
The bolero-style song was composed when radio was rising in popularity and achieved notoriety among the public of the time, both locally and internationally, immediately becoming a classic of the genre worldwide; being recorded multiple times from the 1930s to the present.

In Spain it was a great success in 1949 in the voice of Antonio Machín, a Cuban singer who enjoyed great popularity in the 30s and 40s, but it has also been recorded by other great performers such as Pedro Vargas or Raphael.

== Song recordings ==
Some artists who have recorded this bolero by Julio Brito include:

- Antonio Machín (Compañía del Gramófono Odeon - 1947)
- Pedro Vargas (RCA Victor - 1948)
- Benny Moré (Columbia Records - 1948)
- Antonio "El Chaqueta" (Columbia Records - 1951)
- Henri Rossotti et son Orchestre Tropical - "Qu'elle Était Jolie" (I.L.D - 1951)
- Conjunto Casino (RCA Victor - 1955)
- Franco e i G 5 - "Bocca Troppo Bella" (Columbia - 1957)
- Alfredo Sadel (Sonus - 1959)
- Van Wood Quartet - "Bocca Troppo Bella" (Fonit - 1960)
- Pepe Reyes (Odeon - 1965)
- Luc Barreto (Belter - 1971)
- Emilio "El Moro" (Discophon - 1972)
- Ñico Membiela (Laza - 1976)
- Dandy Beltrán and his Combo (E&G Productions - 1977)
- Las Hermanas Mendoza (Dial Discos, S.A. - 1978)
- Pequeña Compañía (Movieplay - 1979)
- Luis Lucena (Belter - 1980)
- Trio Alma de America (CBS -1980)
- Armando Pico (Omoa - 1987)
- Oscar D'León (Universal Music Group - 1991)
- Los Albas (Marina Music Publishing SLU - 2002)
- Roberto Ledesma (Disco Hit Productions - 2004)
- Raphael (Sony Music - 2010)
- John Pazos and his Bolero Orchestra (YOYO USA, Inc. - 2011)
- Virginia Maestro (Industrias Bala - 2018)
- Carlos Sadness (Sony Music - 2020)
- Najwa Nimri (Mushroom Pillow - 2021)
- André Ekyan et son Orchestre (Odeon - year unknown)

== Lyrics (Spanish) ==
Mira que eres linda,

qué preciosa eres.

Verdad que no he visto,

en mi vida muñeca,

más linda que tú.

Con esos ojazos,

que parecen soles.

Con esa mirada,

siempre enamorada,

con que miras tú.

Mira que eres linda,

qué preciosa eres.

Estando a tu lado,

verdad que me siento,

más cerca de Dios.

Porque eres divina,

tan linda y primorosa,

que solo una rosa,

caída del cielo,

fuera como tú.

- Orquesta -

Con esos ojazos,

que parecen soles.

Con esa mirada,

siempre enamorada,

con que miras tú.

Mira que eres linda,

qué preciosa eres.

Estando a tu lado,

verdad que me siento,

más cerca de Dios.

Porque eres divina,

tan linda y primorosa,

que solo una rosa,

caída del cielo,

fuera como tú.

== Bibliography ==
- Orovio, Helio (1981). Diccionario de la música cubana: biográfico y técnico [Dictionary of Cuban music: biographical and technical] (in Spanish). Editorial Letras Cubanas. ISBN 9591000480.
- Román Fernández, Manuel (2015). "El bolero nació en Cuba (Bolero was born in Cuba)". Bolero de amor (Historias de la canción romántica) [Bolero of love (Stories of the romantic song)] (in European Spanish). Milenio Publicaciones. pp. 24–25. ISBN 9788497436656.
