= Roberto Angleró =

Puerto Rican composer and singer (1929–2018)

- Born: September 12, 1929; Fajardo, Puerto Rico
- Died: April 28, 2018 (aged 88) Kissimmee, Florida, U.S.
- Genres: Bolero, Salsa and Afro-Puerto Rican music genres
- Occupations: composer and singer

Roberto Angleró Pepín (September 12, 1929 – April 28, 2018) was a Puerto Rican music composer and singer, notable for writing various hit songs in the bolero, salsa and Afro-Puerto Rican music genres. He is known for having written various major Spanish language music singles such as "La Pared", "Si Dios fuera negro", "La boda de ella", "Soy Boricua" and others.

== Early life ==
Angleró was born in Fajardo, on Puerto Rico's eastern coast. His father Juan, an itinerant carpenter, was originally from Maricao, on the western side of the island; his mother Carmen was a seamstress. Always moving where work was available, his father moved to Barrio Obrero, one of San Juan's working-class neighborhoods when the couple separated. Plena singer Manuel Jiménez, “Canario”, lived in his same street, and Angleró would attend rehearsals by Jiménez's group. Catalino Curet Alonso was a friend since childhood; Curet was later persuaded to become a postal worker by Angleró's cousin.

Angleró's aunt, who lived nearby, had a small but diverse record collection, and listening to these records he was inspired to become a singer, although stage fright would sometimes prevent him from appearing in amateur programs such as Rafael Quiñones Vidal’s after showing up. He also became an avid baseball player and track and field athlete, and took percussion and trumpet lessons.

As to dissuade Roberto from having his hobbies distract him from obtaining a trade or profession, Angleró’s father sent him to live with family in The Bronx in New York City in 1942. He became a mechanic, his life-long profession, but for a while he also tried his luck as a percussionist and dancer at local Latino clubs such as the Palladium, and even received drumming classes from Max Roach.

=== Racial discrimination ===
While in New York, Angleró was drafted into the United States Air Force. He served four years, saw action in South Korea during the Korean War, and was eventually stationed at Air Force bases in Alabama and Texas. Angleró who was an Airman first class faced multiple racial discrimination incidents while serving in the Southern United States; a particularly acrimonious one occurred in Baton Rouge, Louisiana, where a restaurant owner refused to serve him dinner and later called military police to have him and his Jewish-American Air Force buddy escorted out of the state. Angleró recalls that, while being a proud veteran of the United States’ armed forces, incidents such as this one made him become a fervent supporter of independence for Puerto Rico. These incidents also shaped his views about race relations, most of which were humorously expressed in one of his major hits, a Puerto Rican bomba song called Si Dios fuera negro (If God were black), the melody of which, he claims, came to him in a dream.

== Musical career ==
=== With Orquesta Panamericana ===
After returning to Puerto Rico, and having overcome his stage fright issues, Angleró played with a few neighborhood trios and quartets in Barrio Obrero, until he became a part of Lito Peña’s Orquesta Panamericana. He sang with the orchestra, played minor percussion, and also started writing songs for the band, with the assistance of Peña and his long-time pianist, Héctor Urdaneta, to whom he claims were instrumental for any success he has attained as a composer. He composed his best known single, “La Pared” (The Wall), a bolero song that has been versioned over sixty times and whose best-known versions, besides the original one with the Panamericana (sung by Yayo El Indio), were sung by Felipe Pirela (whose version topped the charts in Pirela's native Venezuela for three months), Roberto Ledesma, Xiomara Alfaro and Armando Manzanero, Bambino

=== With El Gran Combo de Puerto Rico ===
Angleró later established a long songwriting relationship with El Gran Combo de Puerto Rico. He wrote a number of El Gran Combo's songs, including: Serrana (1968), Dos Copas y Un Olé (1969), La Salsa de Hoy (1974), La Soledad (1976), and two major hits, Aquí No Ha Pasado Nada (1978) and Las Hojas Blancas (1973). Many of these songs have been rerecorded by the band in later releases.

=== With Bobby Valentín ===
For a short while, Angleró became one of the singers for Bobby Valentín’s orchestra. He then started one of various inceptions of his own band (Angleró had to change the name of one of these, jokingly named Angleró y Su Congregación, as to not appear as blasphemous), with a young Marvin Santiago as his lead singer. Santiago later joined Valentín’s band and became its first featured singer. Angleró wrote various songs for Valentín’s band, such as: Mírate al espejo, Amolador, Son Son Chararí, and two smash hits: the anthemic “Soy boricua” (a patriotic Puerto Rican song) and “La boda de ella”, a huge hit for the band and then-lead singer Cano Estremera.

=== With Tierra Negra ===
Angleró kept recording songs as vocalist and bandleader. His band's most famous inception, Tierra Negra, was responsible for recording “Si Dios fuera negro”, a humorous take on mildly racist figures of speech in Spanish where references to white and black are switched for comic effect. This song became a smash hit in various Latin American countries (particularly Puerto Rico, Colombia, Panama and Peru), and was later versioned in French and became a hit in Guadeloupe and Martinique. Another song, which has become a popular Christmas song related to Epiphany in Puerto Rico, is “El Cinco de Enero” (January 5). “Esa enfermedad, ¿se pega?” was a minor hit.

Other songs written by Angleró include “Vas por ahí” by Papo Lucca’s Sonora Ponceña, and “Satisfacción”, recorded by Gilberto Santa Rosa

Angleró is virtually retired from the music business, but is still featured occasionally in radio talk show programs as a commenter. He was featured in a short biopic filmed by WIPR-TV in 2003. After Hurricane María went thru Puerto Rico in 2017, Roberto Angleró moved to live with his daughter in Kissimmee, Florida.

== Death ==
Roberto Angleró died on April 28, 2018, at 88 years of age after facing health issues in recent years. He was buried at the Puerto Rico National Cemetery in Bayamón, Puerto Rico.

== Discography ==
- Roberto Angleró y Su Congregación (1970)
- ¿Guaya Salsa? (1973)
- Tierra Negra (1979)
- Por el Color de Tu Piel (1980)
- Trulla Moderna (1981)

== See also ==
- List of notable Puerto Ricans
