= 2012 Echo Klassik Awards =

- Date: October 14, 2012
- Venue: Konzerthaus Berlin
- Hosted by: Nina Eichinger and Rolando Villazón

Television/radio coverage
- Network: ZDF

The 2012 Echo Klassik Awards were held on October 14, 2012. It is the 20th edition of the annual Echo Klassik awards for classical music. The ceremony took place in the Konzerthaus Berlin and was broadcast on ZDF. It was hosted by Nina Eichinger and Rolando Villazón and organised by The German Music Industry Association.

== Performances ==
- Alison Balsom
- ensemble amarcord/Leipziger Streichquartett
- Khatia Buniatishvili
- David Garrett
- Philippe Jaroussky
- Anna Prohaska
- Erwin Schrott
- Klaus Florian Vogt

=== Orchestra ===
- Konzerthausorchester Berlin conducted by Vasily Petrenko

== Winners ==
The winners of the 2012 Echo Klassik awards were:

- Female Singer of the Year – Renée Fleming Poèmes
- Male Singer of the Year – Klaus Florian Vogt Helden
- Conductor of the Year – Riccardo Chailly for Beethoven symphonies
- Instrumentalists of the Year
  - Alison Balsom (trumpet)
  - Eduard Brunner (clarinet)
  - Rudolf Buchbinder (piano)
  - Isabelle Faust (violin)
  - Harald Vogel (organ)
- Ensemble of the Year
  - Modern Instruments – Quatuor Ébène, for Mozart
  - Historical Instruments – Freiburger Barockorchester for Mendelssohn
  - Vocal Music – ensemble amarcord
- Symphonic Recording of the Year
  - 19th century – Roger Norrington for Elgar: Enigma Variations
  - 20th/21st century – Simon Rattle for Schoenberg
- Concerto Recording of the Year
  - 18th century Christian Zacharias Mozart
  - 19th century Maximilian Hornung, Bamberger Symphoniker, Sebastian Tewinkel for Saint-Saëns and Dvořák cello concertos; Maurizio Pollini Staatskapelle Dresden Christian Thielemann for Brahms; Trumpet concerto: Guliano Sommerhalder, Simone Sommerhalder, Roland Fröscher for A. Ponchielli trumpet concertos. Violin concerto: Anne-Sophie Mutter and the New York Philharmonic for Rihm Lichtes Spiel Sebastian Currier Time Machines.
  - 20th/21st century – Jos Van Immerseel Anima Eterna, Bruges for Poulenc
- Opera Recording of the Year
  - 17th/18th century – Gluck: Ezio (Gluck) Alan Curtis
  - 19th century – Beethoven: Fidelio Claudio Abbado
  - 20th/21st century – Franz Schreker: Irrelohe Stefan Blunier.
  - Operatic Arias & Duets – Philippe Jaroussky/Max Emanuel Cenčić/William Christie (harpsichordist)/Les Arts Florissants; Nuria Rial Telemann: Opera Arias.
- Choral Recording of the Year
  - 16th/ 17th century – J. C. Bach: Welt, gute Nacht John Eliot Gardiner
  - 18th/19th century – Fauré: Requiem dir. Peter Dijkstra.
  - 20th/21st century – Coro Nacional de Cuba Digna Guerra, El canto quiere ser luz; Ligeti: Requiem, Apparitions, dir Péter Eötvös
- Chamber Music Recording of the Year
  - 17th/18th century strings – Amaryllis Quartett, J. Haydn, A. Webern
  - 17th/18th century wind – Manz, Trénel, Schuch, Alonso and Quero. Mozart, Beethoven quintets.
  - 19th century string – Joshua Bell, Jeremy Denk French Impressions
  - 19th century wind – Münchner Horntrio J. Brahms, G. Ligeti, C. Koechlin.
  - Mixed Ensemble – Renaud Capuçon, Gérard Caussé, Gautier Capuçon, Nicholas Angelich, Michel Dalberto, Quatuor Ebène Fauré. **20th/21st century – Martha Argerich and Friends Live from Lugano 2010.
  - 20th/ 21st century Strings – Galatea Quartet Bloch: Landscapes – Music for String Quartet. (Strings) Hilary Hahn, Charles Ives
- Solo Recording of the Year
  - 17th/18th century – (Violin) Rebekka Hartmann. (Piano) Jin Ju Beethoven, Czerny, Schubert. Piano Rafał Blechacz Debussy, Szymanowski.
- Song Recording of the Year – Werner Güra Schubert: Willkommen und Abschied
- Lifetime Achievement Award – Daniel Barenboim,
- Newcomer awards – Anna Prohaska (soprano), Khatia Buniatishvili (piano), Miloš Karadaglić (guitar), Julian Steckel (cello), Vasily Petrenko (conductor)
- The Klassik-ohne-Grenzen Prizes – Tori Amos Night of Hunters; Pera Ensemble and Valer Barna-Sabadus Baroque Oriental; Erwin Schrott Rojotango
- Editorial Achievement of the Year – Siegbert Rampe Mozart: Sämtliche Clavierwerke Vol. 12
- World Premiere Recording of the Year – Michala Petri, Danish National Vocal Ensemble (DR Vokalensemblet), Stephen Layton The Nightingale – New Nordic Music for Recorder and Choir Uģis Prauliņš, Daniel Börtz.
- The Classics for Children Award – Ensemble L'art pour l'art Haltbar gemacht
- Jury Awards for the Fostering of Young Talents – Die Deutsche Kammerphilharmonie Bremen "Zukunftslabor". Bertelsmann Stiftung "Musikalische Grundschule"
- Music DVD Recording of the Year – (Opera) Theater Lübeck Wagner: Der Ring des Nibelungen
- Bestseller of the Year – David Garrett Legacy
- Special Jury Awards – Israel Chamber Orchestra. Thomanerchor Leipzig
