= Coro Nacional de Cuba =

National choir of Cuba

The Coro Nacional de Cuba is the national choir of Cuba. It was created in 1960 by Serafín Pro Guardiola as a continuation of the Coro del Ejército Rebelde (Choir of the Rebel Army) that had been founded in 1959. It was initially called the Coro del Teatro Nacional (National Theater of Cuba chorus) and then Coro Polifónico (Polyphonic Choir), until recognition as the National Choir of Cuba. Since 1975 it has been led by the woman conductor Digna Guerra (b. 1945). The choir won Germany's Echo Klassik choral award in 2012.

== Discography ==
- El canto quiere ser luz - compositions by Roberto Valera Babalù en La Habana Fieja; Cononces un fuego que no da calor, Frank Fernández (pianist) Vértigo de Lluvia. Las Casas, Oscar Hernández Falcón la rosa roja bolero, César Alejandro Carrillo (Venezuela, b.1957) Missa sine nomine, Electo Silva Gaínza (Cuba, b.1930) Para ti, Miguel Matamoros Juramento - Bolero, Wilma Alba Cal (Cuba, b.1988) 5 Canciones, René Clausen Prayer, Silvio Rodríguez Hay quien precisa; Locuras, Leo Brouwer Son Mercedes, Francisco Repilado Chan-Chan. Coro Nacional de Cuba, dir. Digna Guerra MDG 2012
