= Julio Ángel =

Puerto Rican singer

- Born: Julio Manuel Acevedo Lanuza; December 23, 1945; Bayamón, Puerto Rico
- Died: July 6, 2015 (aged 69); Miami, Florida, U.S.
- Occupation: Singer

Julio Manuel Acevedo Lanuza (December 23, 1945 – July 6, 2015), better known as Julio Ángel, was a Puerto Rican trio, bolero, rock and pop singer.

== Biography ==
Months after Julio Angel's birth, the Acevedo family emigrated to New York, New York, returning to Puerto Rico in 1955. Julio Angel showed interest in singing in his pre-teens and, a few years later, formed a band which he and his friends named "Julito and the Latin Lads".

During the 1960s, Julio Angel made his television debut at Puerto Rico's WAPA-TV canal 4 television channel, singing with his group, participating in Myrta Silva's show, "Una Hora Contigo" ("One Hour With You"), which lead him to become one of the nueva olas teen idols in Puerto Rico.

Around this time, Julio Angel started singing along rock stars like Neil Sedaka, Frankie Avalon and others during their concerts in Puerto Rico. In 1965, he joined Alfred D. Herger in a show named "Canta la Juventud". In 1966, Acevedo and Herger would collaborate on another show, named "2 a Go-go". Julio Angel had, previous to working with Herger, scored a radio hit with a doo-wop song named "Nunca" ("Never"). The song that made him a household name across Latin America, however, was the one named "El Diamante" ("The Diamond")

He then recorded a song named "Club del Clan" along with another of Puerto Rico's Nueva Ola stars, Lucecita Benitez, followed by his first album, the eponymous "Julio Angel". Once this album reached stores, Julio Angel was given the nickname "Puerto Rican Beatle" by Herger.

The late 1960s proved a busy period for the Puerto Rican singer, as he released three albums, by then signed with RCA Victor. These albums were named "2 a Go-go", "El Idolo" ("The Idol"), and "Que Cosa Trae La Musica Esta Noche" ("Let's See What Music Brings Tonight"). In 1969, he scored another international major hit with "Tan Bonita Como Tu" ("As Pretty as You"). He then collaborated with the famous Trio Los Condes.

After continuous musical success during the 1970s (during which he moved to WAPA-TV's main rival channel, Canal 2 and sang on Pepsi Cola's Puerto Rican commercials), Julio Angel released, in the 1980s, an album named "Ensueno" ("In Dreams") in which he paid homage to other musical establishments such as Cuba's Casino de la Playa, the Rafael Munoz Orchestra and Cesar Concepcion's Orchestra. In 1982, he re-released "El Diamante" in Puerto Rico, which once again charted among the top local hits of the time.

== Later life and health ==
During 2013, Julio Angel suffered an ischemic stroke that left him severely debilitated, with impaired mobility and unable to communicate. It was during this time, that Julio Angél was diagnosed with multiple myeloma.

His health condition and his health care choices triggered a battle between three of his children and a fourth, his son Julio Jr. Allegedly, against his father's and other siblings wishes, Julio Jr. placed Julio Angel in a nursing home. Yashira Marié, Alejandro Manuel and Everling had agreed with Julio Jr. that their father should be cared for in his home. The three younger siblings were not allowed to communicate with their father. It was during this time that Julio Angel's health drastically deteriorated, and the singer suffered two falls, dislocating a shoulder the first time and breaking an arm the second time.

In late July 2015, he was flown by his children, Yashira Marié, Alejandro Manuel and Everling to Miami, Florida, to seek better medical treatment and improve his quality of life. Julio Ángel was able to spend Father's Day with three of his four children (the fourth one called him by telephone on that day). Julio Angel was in failing health most of 2015. On July 6, he died at a hospice in Florida, aged 69.

== Personal life ==
Julio Angel had two sons and two daughters: sons Julio Jr. and Alejandro, and daughters Yashira and Everling.

== See also ==
- List of Puerto Ricans
