= Tam Tam o El origen de la rumba =

Tam Tam o El origen de La Rumba
- Image taken during filming.
- Directed by: Ernesto Caparrós
- Produced by: Víctor Correa
- Starring: Chela Castro; Yolanda González; Sergio Miró; José Ochoa; Gabriela Santos; Julio Brito; Celina y Papo (dancing couple); Dance ensemble of the cabaret "Edén Concert"; La Sonora Matancera; Alfredo Brito's ensemble
- Cinematography: Laureano Rodríguez Gavaldá; Luis Ricardo Molina; Ricardo Delgado
- Edited by: Víctor Correa; Luis Ricardo Molina
- Music by: Alfredo Brito; Julio Brito
- Production company: Noticiario Royal News
- Release date: 1938 (Cuba)
- Running time: 22
- Country: Cuba
- Language: Spanish

Tam Tam o El origen de la rumba (1938, Cuba) is a pioneer short musical film of the Cuban sound cinema, directed by Ernesto Caparrós, based on the music by the brothers Alfredo Brito and Julio Brito. The film aims to show the evolution of La Rumba from its beginnings, through the love story of two young slaves.

== Plot ==
Through music and dance, the evolution of La Rumba is told. As a common thread, the love story of two young slaves is used. Another slave, ignored by the young slave girl, makes her the victim of an evil spell, from which she is freed in a ceremony by her godmother and the priests of the tribe. The liberation of the young slave girl culminates in a dissolution that shows the rumba as it was interpreted and danced in 1938.

== History ==
Tam Tam o El origen de la rumba, was part of a pioneering Cuban sound film project of the 1930s, directed by Ernesto Caparrós and produced by Royal News, which consisted of three short films: El frutero (1933), Como el arrullo de palmas (1936) and Tam Tam o El origen de la rumba (1938), which is the best known for having survived a copy. The other two films that were part of the project seem to have been lost forever.

The film was shot in 16mm format, Black and White, with a duration of 22 minutes and its location was the cabaret "Eden Concert" in Havana, Cuba, a fashionable place of the time that years later would be known as "Zombie Club".

It was directed by Ernesto Caparrós, a pioneer of Cuban sound films, who was also in charge of the sound.

The technical team in charge of the photography was formed by: Laureano Rodríguez Gavaldá, Luis Ricardo Molina and Ricardo Delgado.

The plot of the film was based on a musical poem by the Brito brothers, and featured the participation of the Sonora Matancera. At minute 00:03:57 of the film, Julio Brito, co-author of the music, can be seen singing. The Sonora Matancera makes its appearance at minute 00:06:20, performing the song "Guaguancó". Towards the end of the film, Alfredo Brito can be seen conducting the orchestra.

After attending the premiere, in a private screening for the press at the "Fausto" theater, Germinal Barral (Don Galaor), chronicler of the time, wrote in the magazine "Bohemia":

Tam-Tam is to cinematography what the poem is to literature.

— Germinal Barral (Don Galaor) – Bohemia – August 21, 1938 (page 42)., Tamm, Tamm

On April 14, 2013 "Tam Tam o El origen de la rumba" was screened at the Quad Cinema in New York City for attendees of the 14th edition of the Havana Film Festival in New York, within a special sidebar of early Cuban cinema, curated by Luciano Castillo, a critic, researcher, cinema historian, and director of the André Bazin Media Library in the International Film and Television School in San Antonio de los Baños (EICTV).

== Cast ==
- Chela Castro
- Yolanda González
- José Ochoa
- Graciela Santos
- Sergio Miró
- Julio Brito
- Celina y Papo (dancing couple)
- Dance ensemble of the cabaret "Edén Concert"
- La sonora Matancera
- Alfredo Brito's ensemble

== Production ==
=== Directed by ===
- Ernesto Caparrós

=== Production company ===
- Noticiario Royal News

=== Producer ===
- Víctor Correa

=== Cinematography ===
- Laureano Rodríguez Gavaldá
- Luis Ricardo Molina
- Ricardo Delgado

=== Edited by ===
- Víctor Correa
- Luis Ricardo Molina

=== Sound by ===
- Ernesto Caparrós

== Music ==
=== Orchestral conducting ===
Alfredo Brito

=== Composers ===
- Alfredo Brito
- Julio Brito

=== Interpreters ===
- Julio Brito
- Sonora Matancera
- Alfredo Brito's ensemble

== Release ==
The premiere of the film took place at the "Fausto" theater (Havana, Cuba), in a private screening for the press, in August 1938.

== Bibliography ==
- "Cine Sonoro (Documental)". Bitácora de cine cubano, Tomo I (La República, 1897 – 1960) (in Spanish). Madrid, España: AECID (Agencia Española de Cooperación Internacional para el Desarrollo y Ministerio de Asuntos Exteriores y de Cooperación). 2018. pp. 134–135. ISBN 9788494835247.
- Galaor, Don (1943). Ellos y Ellas al micrófono (in Spanish). Havana, Cuba: Imprenta NINON.
- Barral, G. (1938-08-21), Tamm, Tamm (PDF) (in Spanish), Havana, Cuba: Bohemia, pp. 19, 42–43
