= Wilma Alba Cal =

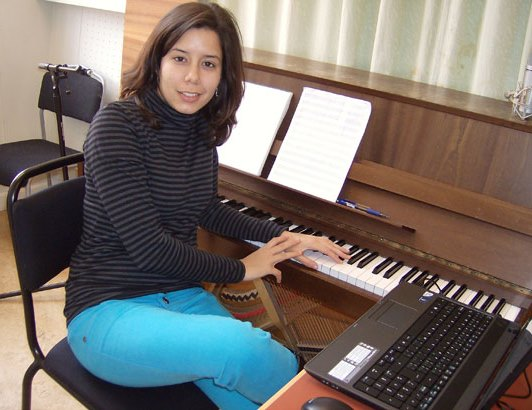

Background information
- Born: Wilma Alba Cal; May 16, 1988 (age 37); Cuba
- Genres: Choir; Electronic music; Classical music
- Occupation: Composer
- Years active: 2007–present
- Label: Colibrí

Wilma Alba Cal (May 16, 1988) is a Cuban composer of contemporary classical music. Her work has been recognized in several competitions in Cuba organized by National Union of Writers and Artists of Cuba (UNEAC), Instituto Superior de Arte, Asociación Hermanos Saíz and Instituto Cubano de la Música. Her catalog includes chamber, choir, electroacoustic and orchestral music, in addition to soundtracks for theatre and audiovisual works.

== Life ==
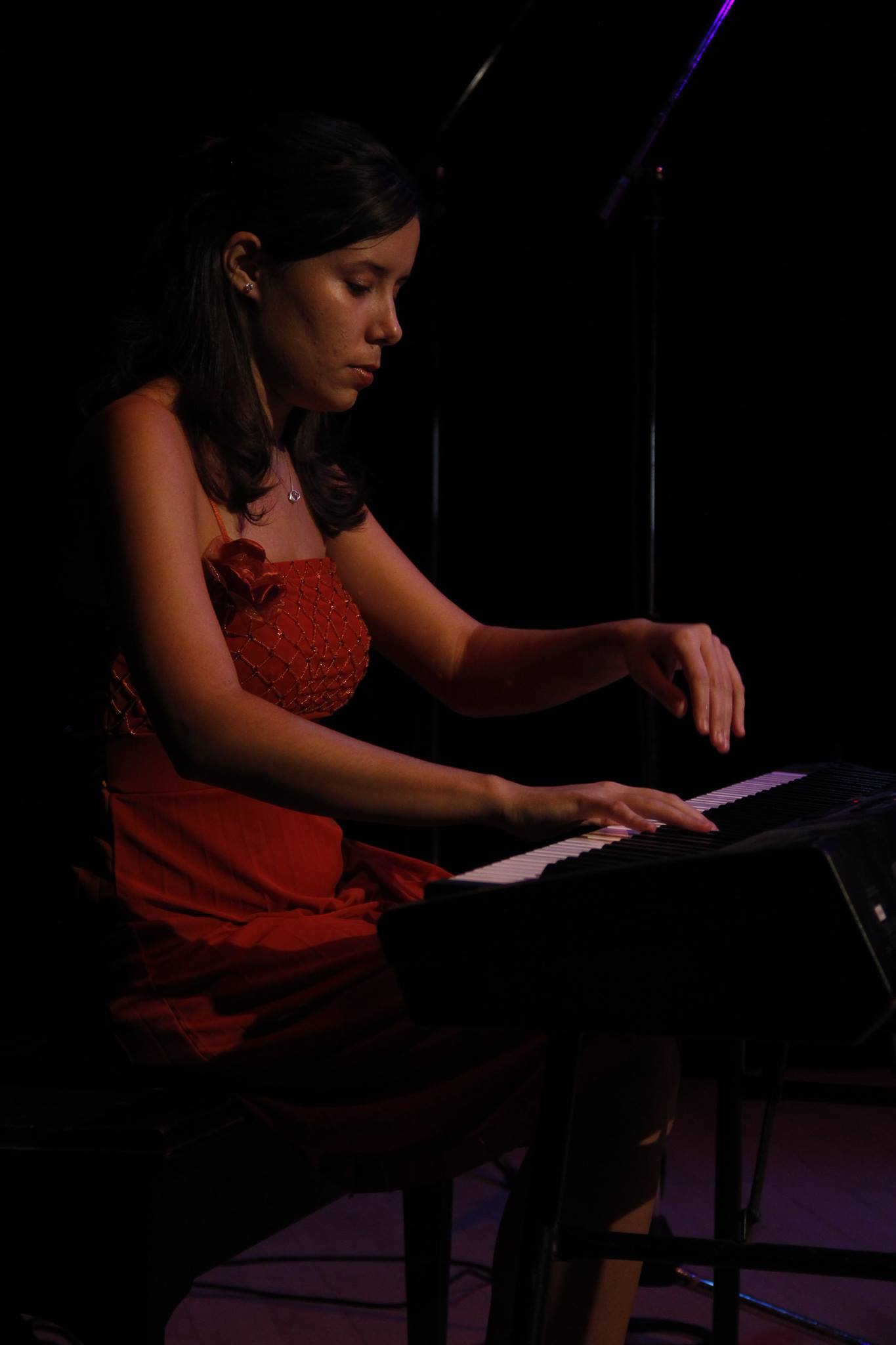
Wilma playing her pieces

Wilma Alba Cal was born on May 16, 1988, in Guanabacoa, Havana, Cuba. Since childhood she had the musical influence of her family and her diverse environment which made her start studies in music at the age of 10. In 2007 she graduated as Choir Conductor at Guillermo Tomás Conservatory. The following year she begins to study composition at the Instituto Superior de Arte guided by the professor Juan Piñera. She graduated in Musical Composition in 2012; she was selected one of the best graduates of the institution. After that, taking part of an exchange in spring 2012, she continues studies at the Academy of Music and Drama of the University of Goteborg, Sweden. She has a Diploma in Creación Sonora con Nuevas Tecnologías of the Centro Mexicano para la Música y las Artes Sonoras (2017). Currently she is attending a master at the Instituto Superior de Arte.

== Career ==
As a consequence of her choir education Wilma has been closely linked to this kind of music. She was singer at the choirs: Juvenil del Coro Nacional de Cuba conducted by Digna Guerra and Ensemble Vocal Luna, conducted by Sonia McCormack. Her professional work includes musical adviser, arranger, producer, theater and audiovisual soundtrack composer. She has also participated as jury in prestigious events such as CUBADISCO Prize 2015 and 2017 in Electronic Music Category. She is a member of Laboratorio Nacional de Música Electroacústica, the Asociación Hermanos Saíz and the Unión Nacional de Escritores y Artistas de Cuba.

=== Musical adviser ===
- Simplemente otras dimensiones. Dance Group "Así somos", director Lourdes Cajigal y Vladimir Peraza. (2009)
- Un hombre es un hombre by Bertold Bretch. "Compañía Teatral Rita Montaner", director Fernando Quiñones. (2010)
- Afuera by Liliam Ojeda. "Compañía Teatral Rita Montaner", director Amaury Ricardo. (2011)
- Verde verde, film of Instituto Cubano del Arte e Industria Cinematográficos, director Enrique Pineda Barnet. (2011)
- ¡Ay, Carmela! by José Sanchiz Sinesterra, director Pancho García. (2014)

=== Original compositions ===
- Sobre nuestro compañero Roque Dalton (2013) Documentary First Prize at International Festival "Santiago Álvarez in Memoriam" (2015).
- Armonia, short fiction written and directed by Sheyla Pool (2014).
- Beatriz y los Papas Malvas, radio children's novel produced by the Facultad de Arte de los Medios de Comunicación Audiovisual (FAMCA) (2015).
- Nuestra Haydee, documentary dedicated to Haydee Santamaria, produced by Casa de las Américas and Cubavision International (2015).

=== Musical arrangements ===
It's been a pleasure, because I love the Silvio's music, which I have heard since childhood, and also the fact that involved artists of different tendencies, and diverse genres at the same song.

— Wilma Alba Cal
- Todo el mundo tiene su Moncada by Silvio Rodríguez, which identified the 2nd Congress of the Asociación Hermanos Saíz (2013) with Ivan Lejardi and Yadiel Bolaño.
- Escaramujo by Silvio Rodríguez for television program La Pupila Asombrada featuring DJ Lejardi.
- Alma CUJAE by Israel Rojas, Choral Arrangement Anthem for the 50th anniversary of Polytechnic José Antonio Echeverría (2014).
- Oraré by Israel Rojas and Ensemble Vocal Luna, included in the album "Soy" (2015) of the pop group Buena Fe.

=== Presentations and conferences ===
Her works have been performed at various events and festivals. He has lectured on his work and creative process:

- Festival of Contemporary Music of Havana, organized by the Association of Musicians of the UNEAC (2008, 2009, 2010, 2011, 2012 and 2014).
- XII Choir International Symposium Choirs in Marktoberdorf (Germany, 2011).
- Harmonie Festival 2011 (Germany).
- World Choral Festival America Cantat 7 (Colombia, 2013).
- Academic Symposium of XVII International Fair Cubadisco (2013).
- First International Workshop of Choirs CorHabana (2013).
- XXX International Choir Festival of Santiago de Cuba (2013).
- National Festival of Chamber Music "A tempo with Caturla" (Villa Clara, Cuba. 2014 and 2015 editions).
- VI Festival of Chamber Music Leo Brouwer (Cuba, 2014).
- International Festival of Music and New Technologies Visiones Sonoras X (Mexico, 2014).
- Composition Latin American Workshop (editions 2009, 2011, 2013 and 2015) organized by Casa de las Americas and the UNEAC during actions Composition Award.
- Flores y balas (San Juan, 2014 and 2015 editions) event organized by the Conservatory of Music of Puerto Rico.
- Opening of the exhibition "Cortázar, crossed letters" (2015), exhibited at the Latin American Gallery of Casa de las Americas.
- XII Havana Biennial: project "An Essay on Flow"; in collaboration with Mexican artist Hector Zamora. Sound and light intervention at the Music School building (El Gusano) Instituto Superior de Arte with 70 musicians: voices, string, wind, percussion students of music (2015).
- Cultural exchange and creation Project: "La Revuelta" organized by the Instituto Cubano de Investigación Cultural "Juan Marinello" (2015).
- Les Voix Humaines Festival organized by Leo Brouwer office (2015).
- XII Festival Internacional de Coros "CorHabana 2016" organized by the Centro Nacional de Música de Concierto.
- ¡Celebra la música! (2016) Project of the Ministry of Culture of Colombia. A 100 of children and teenager's voices from different regions of the country.
- Focus! 2017. The 33rd annual Festival of the Juilliard School. New Juilliard Ensemble. Joel Sachs, Founding Director and Conductor.
- New Music Miami ISCM Festival (2017). International Society for Contemporary Music and Florida International University (FIU). Orlando Jacinto García, Director.
- Festival Internazionale Green Music – Piegaro (2017) Italia. Ensemble Namaste.

=== Teaching experience ===
After her graduation from middle level, and at the same time she carries her creative work, she has been teaching at the middle level of the professional education of music in Havana in subjects such as: Musical Analysis, Popular and Contemporary Harmony, Choral Arrangements, History of Cuban Music and Counterpoint at the Conservatories Guillermo Tomás, Amadeo Roldán and Escuela Nacional de Arte (ENA). As conductor, she attends (2010 to the moment), the Chamber Choir of the Conservatory Guillermo Tomás.

== Discography ==
- El canto quiere ser luz (2011) – Coro Nacional de Cuba and Entrevoces – conducted by Digna Guerra – label MDG – Echo Klassik Prize of the German Phonographic Academy 2012
- Cantos de Cuba y del Mundo (2013) – Ensemble Vocal Luna – conducted by Wilmia Verrier – label Colibrí

== Awards and nominations ==
Year	Nominated work	Award	Category	Result
2008	Sonata para clarinete y piano	"Musicalia" Composition Contest organized by the Music Faculty of Instituto Superior de Arte	Compositions for one or two instruments	Winner
2009	Ida y vuelta	"Musicalia" Composition Contest organized by the Music Faculty of Instituto Superior de Arte	Compositions for 3–5 instruments	Winner
2009	2 piezas para coro mixto	"Musicalia" Composition Contest organized by the Music Faculty of Instituto Superior de Arte	Choral music	Mention Winner
2009	Descifrando a Bartok	UNEAC Contest of Composition "Harold Gramatges"	String quartet	Mention Winner
2010	5 canciones para coro mixto a capella	II National Award of Composition "Alejandro García Caturla" organized by Agencia Cubana de Derecho de Autor Musical and Instituto Cubano de la Música	Choral music	First and Second Prize Winner
2011	Transfiguraciones	"Conmutaciones" Musical Creation Grant sponsored by the Asociación Hermanos Saíz	-	Winner
2011	Anti díptico	"Musicalia" Composition Contest organized by the Music Faculty of Instituto Superior de Arte	Electroacoustic music	Winner
2014	Escenas para orquesta	IV National Award of Composition "Alejandro García Caturla" organized by Agencia Cubana de Derecho de Autor Musical and Instituto Cubano de la Música	Symphonic music	Winner

== Performances of her music ==
Group	Conductor	Institution	Country
Coro Entrevoces	Digna Guerra	-	Cuba
Coro Infantil del Coro Nacional de Cuba	Delfina Acay	-	Cuba
Coro D' Profundis	Ladys Sotomayor	-	Cuba
Ensemble Vocal Luna	Wilmia Verrier	-	Cuba
Coro Vocal Leo	Corina Campos	-	Cuba
Coro Cantores de Cienfuegos	Honey Moreira	-	Cuba
Coro Profesional de Matanzas	José Antonio Méndez	-	Cuba
Vocal Imago de Santi Spíritu	Marlene Vega	-	Cuba
Orquesta Sinfónica de Villa Clara	Irina Toledo	-	Cuba
Coral Provincial Infantil de Villa Clara	Nelys Cañizares	-	Cuba
Trio Móviles	Osmany Hernández	-	Cuba
Quinteto Ventus Habana	Alina Blanco	-	Cuba
Coro de Cámara de la Academia de Música y Drama	Gunno Palmqvist	Gotemburgo University	Sweden
Coro de Cámara de Gotemburgo	Gunnar Eriksson	-	Sweden
Coro JOCONDE	Nuria Fernández	Joven Coro Nacional de España	Spain
Alea 21	Manuel Ceide	Conservatorio de Música de Puerto Rico	Puerto Rico
