= Electo Silva =

Cuban choirmaster and composer

Electo Silva Gainza (1930–2017) was a Cuban choirmaster and composer. He was born in Santiago de Cuba, but moved to Haiti with his family as a child and began his musical training there. In 1952, he obtained a scholarship to study music in Paris. He also studied at the University of Oriente, where he later became a professor of education and psychology.

He was the founder of several choral groups, and he also arranged music for them. He directed the Orfeón Santiago and the University of Oriente choir for several decades. In addition, he composed music for piano and violin. He was awarded the Premio Nacional de Música de Cuba in 2001 for his contributions to Cuban music.

He died in 2017 in Santiago de Cuba.
