= Panchito Riset =

Cuban singer (1910–1988)

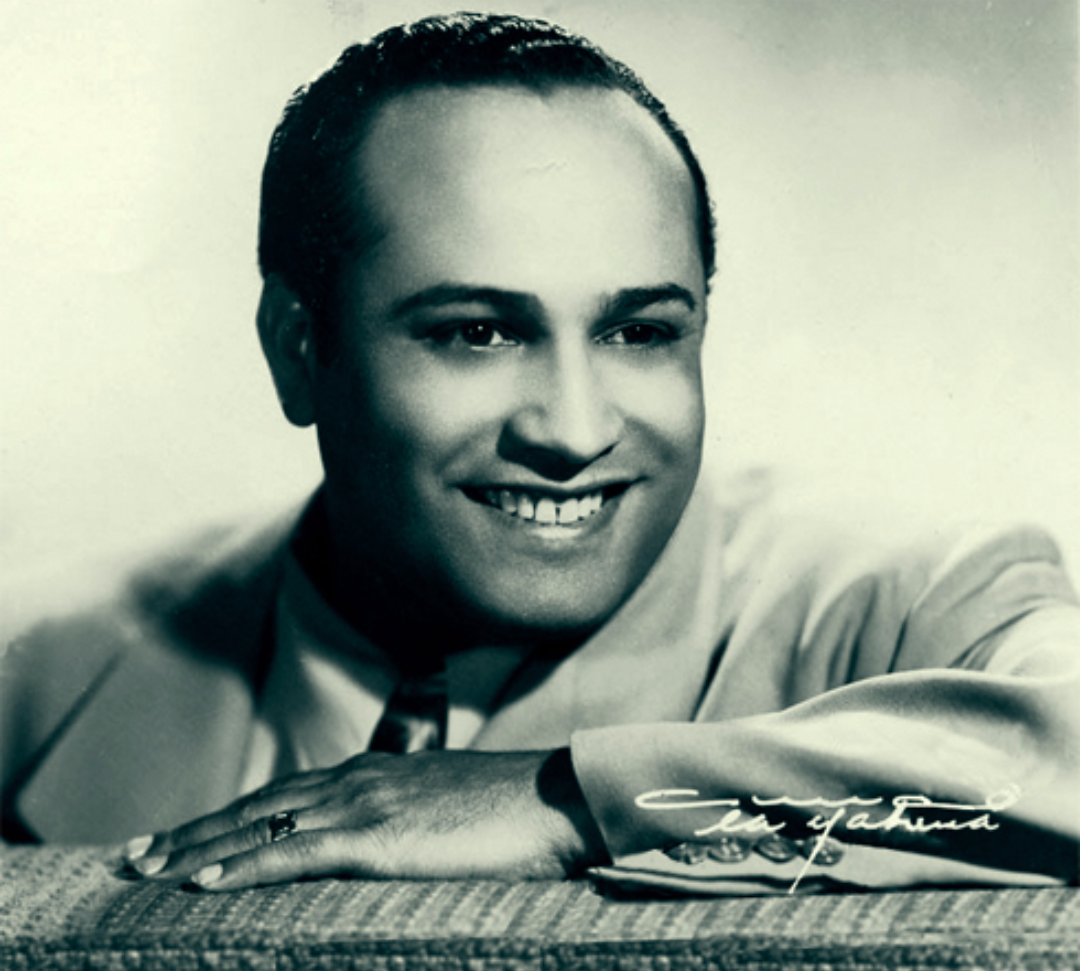
Panchito Riset in the 1950s.

Francisco Hilario Riser Rincón (1910–1988), better known as Panchito Riset, was a Cuban singer, known for his interpretation of boleros in the pre-war period.

He was born in the Atarés district of Havana. He learned to sing and play the tres guitar as a boy. Initially, he sang with groups such as Septeto Esmeralda, Sexteto Cauto, Septeto Habanero, and the Ismael Díaz Orchestra. In 1933, he went to New York to sing and record with the Antobal Orchestra, replacing the singer Machín. His name was misspelled "Riset" instead of "Riser" on an early record, and thus his musical name was born.

Riset became a prominent figure in the Latin music scene in 1930s NYC, and sang and recorded with numerous musical groups, among them Cuarteto Flores, Cuarteto Caney, Cuarteto Victoria of Rafael Hernández, the Xavier Cugat Orchestra, the Enric Madriguera Orchestra, and Cubanacán. He performed in New York venues like La Conga and Yumurí and at the Cabaret Trovadero in California.

Riset became a US citizen and served as an artist and medical volunteer army in World War II. Afterwards he resumed his singing career, notably at the Versailles cabaret where he performed for 18 years. He also sang at Carnegie Hall. During the 1950's he recorded for the Ansonia Records Label where he recorded some of his very best songs accompanied by the Luis "Lija" Ortiz Conjunto.

He died in 1988 from complications brought on by diabetes. Towards the end of his life, he was blind and his legs amputated. He is buried in Calverton National Cemetery.
