= Ildefonso Acosta =

Cuban guitarist (born 1939)

Ildefonso Acosta Escobar (born 1939) is a Cuban guitarist. Born in Matanzas, he started his musical training at an early age, studying the violin and the trumpet. His teachers included Candido Failde, Rafael Somavilla and Dagoberto Hernandez Piloto. He also taught himself to play the guitar.

Acosta Escobar is well known as both a composer and a performer. He started performing in concerts in 1960, and has played extensively at home and abroad. Noted compositions include the award-winning "Quinteto para dos musicaturas cubanas" and "Homenaje al 26".

He is married to the musicologist Iraida Trujillo. He continues to live in Matanzas where he teaches the guitar and where he has served as the head of the local UNEAC. He won the Premio Nacional de Música de Cuba in 2019.
