= Guajira (music) =

Cuban music genre

Guajira [ɡwaˈxi.ɾa] is a music genre derived from the punto cubano. According to some specialists, the punto cubano was known in Spain since the 18th century, where it was called "punto de La Habana", and by the second half of the 19th century it was adopted by the incipient Spanish Flamenco style, which included it within its "palos" with the name of guajira. Guajira was utilized by Spanish Zarzuela composers, such as Ruperto Chapí, who included it in his well known play "La Revoltosa", from 1897. Two years later, in 1899, the Cuban composer Jorge Anckermann inaugurated a new genre with his song "El arroyo que murmura", the first Cuban guajira. This song became a model that was adopted by many other Cuban composers at a later time, and was frequently included in the Cuban Zarzuela and vernacular theater.

The Cuban guajira preserved the characteristic rhythm of its ancestors, the punto cubano and the Spanish guajira, which was the sesquiáltera or horizontal hemiola.

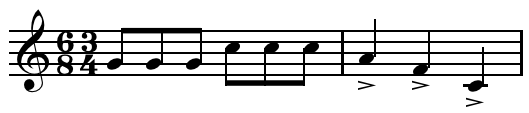
Horizontal hemiola.

Its form usually alternates a first section in minor mode, with a second section modulating to its direct Major relative. Its lyrics frequently refer to rural themes in an idealistic and bucolic way, and generally evoke the goodness of rural life and romantic love stories.

== Guajira de salón, or guajira-son ==
From the 1930s, the guajira was refined and popularized by the singer and guitarist Guillermo Portabales, whose elegant style was known as guajira de salón or guajira-son. This is nothing but another case of synonymy within the Cuban popular music, because in spite of being named as guajira, the style of his songs was nothing else but those of the Cuban son and bolero-son; although their lyrics were always related to rural themes. Since the thirties until his death in a traffic accident, in 1970, Guillermo Portabales sang and recorded numerous guajiras de salón through North and South America with great popular acclaim.

Other renowned performers of guajira-son were Celina González, Coralia Fernández, Ramón Veloz y Radeúnda Lima. One of the most famous guajiras-son is the guantanamera, composed by Joseíto Fernández and internationally popularized during the 1960s by the American folk singer Pete Seeger.

== Etymology ==
The term guajira is a feminine form of guajiro, which comes from the Antillean Arawak and means "lord, powerful man". In Cuba it is used to name those people who work or live in the fields, or to name people who behave like them because they can be rude or with little knowledge (cfr. hillbilly). Also colloquially, it can refer to people who live outside the capital of Cuba, la Habana, and in rural areas without being farm workers. In some sentences, it is used to encourage a shy person, like in "no seas guajiro y pregúntale" ("don't be a peasant and ask her").

== See also ==
- Music of Cuba
- Punto guajiro
