= Trio Los Condes =

Puerto Rican music trio

Trio Los Condes is a Puerto Rican music trio that has had international success throughout Latin America and in the United States. The trio released several albums, including collaborations with Tito Lara, Armando Manzanero, Julio Angel, Manny Manuel and others. The trio was formed in 1959 in Manhattan, New York City. The original members were Rafael "Rafita" Maldonado, lead singer and guitar; José Luis "Tato" Díaz Rodríguez, second harmony singer and guitar; and Fernando Ramos, requinto player, third harmony singer and director.

Their career spanned more than 4 decades. In the 1960s, the Trio played at international venues as far as Montreal, Canada. In 2017, the Trio was still actively performing at local venues.
