= Alfredo Sadel =

Venezuelan singer and actor

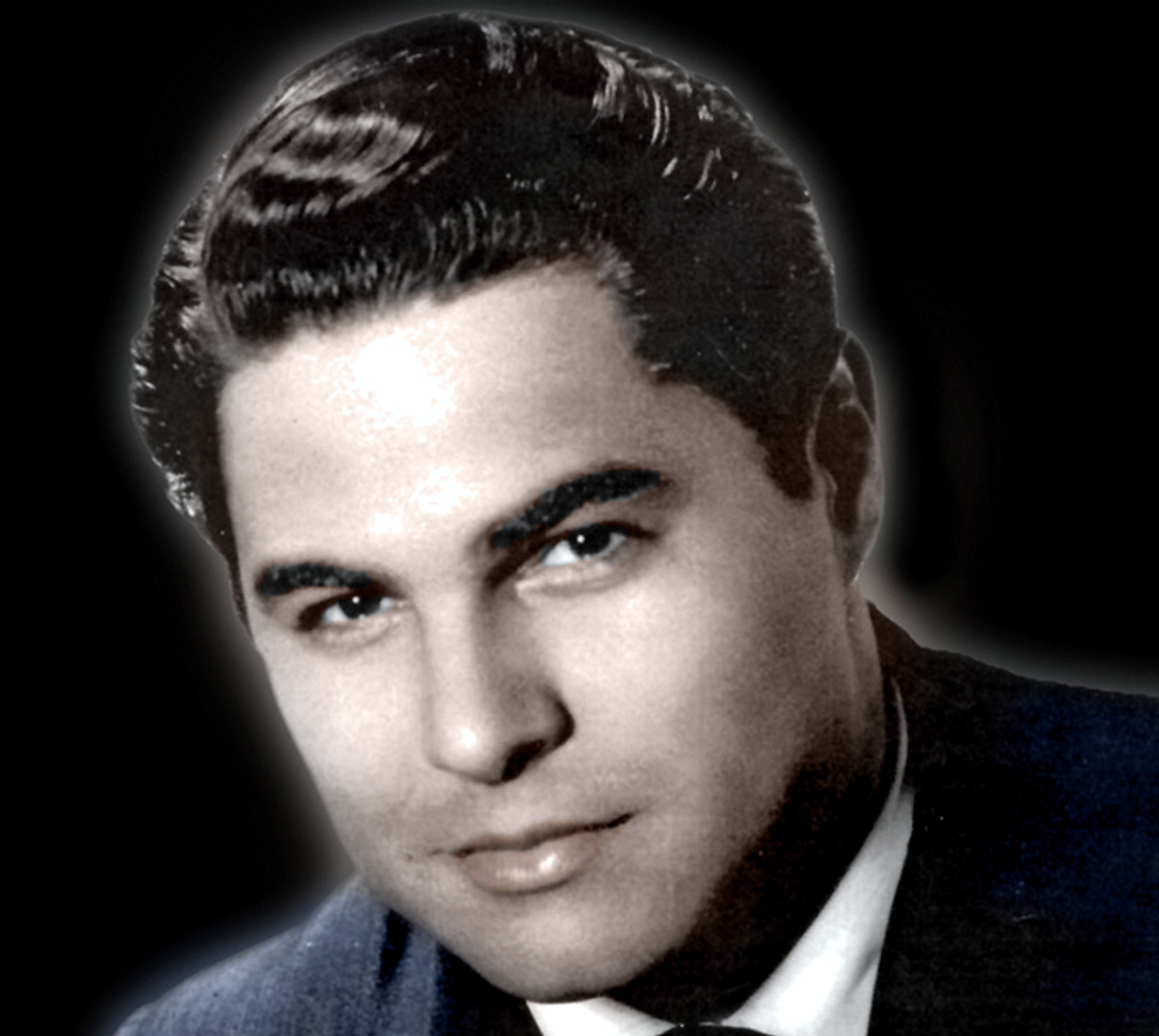
- Born: February 22, 1930; Caracas, Venezuela
- Died: June 28, 1989 (aged 59); Caracas, Venezuela
- Occupations: Singer; actor

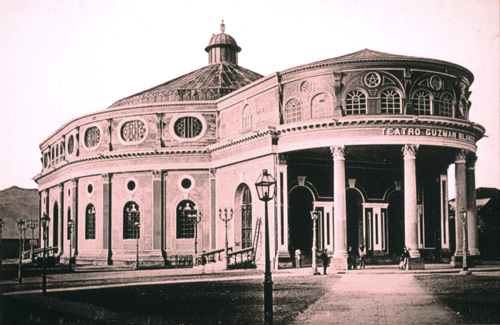
Theater "Guzmán Blanco", now the Municipal Theater of Caracas "Alfredo Sadel".

Manuel Alfredo Sánchez Luna, better known as Alfredo Sadel (February 22, 1930 – June 28, 1989) was a popular Venezuelan singer and actor.

== Early life ==
Manuel Alfredo Sánchez Luna was born in Caracas, Venezuela, to Manuel Sánchez Benítez and Luisa Amelia Luna.

Since his early childhood, he showed interest in music, participating in the choir of the local church. His debut was singing “Ave Maria” at the Caracas Cathedral, where he impressed those who heard him.

He went to school at “Colegio Domingo Savio” at Los Teques, but had to leave at the age of fourteen due to his family’s financial problems. Salesian priests, Calderon and Sidi contributed to his musical education.

By the time Alfredo was gaining fame in the music industry, there were already two professionals with similar names, "Alci" and Alex Sánchez. Therefore, he decided to change his name, taking the first syllable of his last name “SA” and added “DEL” in honor to his idol, Carlos Gardel.

== Music career ==
Sadel was affectionately called "The Favorite Tenor of Venezuela".

Many different patrons sponsored his career, which started at “Escuela Superior de Música de Caracas” and continued in many different places such as Mexico City; New York City; Buenos Aires; Barcelona, Spain; Salzburg and Milan.

In 1948, he recorded the first album produced in Venezuela: “Diamante Negro” quickstep. The record was a sales success and the start of his upward musical career. While under contract to Metro-Goldwyn-Mayer as a potential successor to the cinematic tenor Mario Lanza, Sadel began a serious study of Italian opera, eventually singing full-opera productions under his birth name, Alfredo Sanchez-Luna. Among the roles he sang successfully were the Duke of Mantua in Verdi's Rigoletto.

== Last years ==
In 1978, he returned to Cuba receiving support that encouraged him to record popular music again, including an LP with music by Los Panchos and another, in which he paid his tribute to Carlos Gardel.

He settled in New York since 1985 and traveled a lot since then to Caracas and Colombia, especially to Medellín, where he said he felt with pleasure the great affection paid by his people. When he was happiest about the possibility of performing with the Metropolitan Opera in New York, his health began to deteriorate. He was performing in Cali, Colombia, when he had to travel urgently to Caracas on December 31, 1988. In 1988 and 1989 he appeared at the Teresa Carreño Theater with the Venezuela Symphony Orchestra in concerts that marked his farewell.

He made wonderful duets, among them with the soprano Alba Marina and another with Beny Moré who occupies preferences among collectors, the bolero "Alma libre". He stood out as a composer, due to his inspiration countless pieces such as "I did not deceive you", "They are two words", "Another rose", "The iron man", "Swallows of time", "I want Maracaibo", "Reasoning ", and dozens more.

In total, Sadel recorded more than 2000 songs collected on about 200 78 RPM discs and about 130 full-length albums released in various countries; The Foundation, that bears his name, are collecting them on discs with digital technology, in a series called "Alfredo Sadel Documents", so that his voice and his memory are always present in the Venezuelan cultural heritage. Sadel obtained great achievements in the career of lyrical singer worldwide, but despite his successes in the lyrical environment, he continued to perform popular music.

Sadel died in Caracas at the age of 59.

== See also ==
- Venezuela
- Venezuelan music
