= Emilio el Moro =

Spanish musician and humorist

Emilio Jiménez Gallego (2 November 1923 – 12 July 1987), known as Emilio el Moro, was a Spanish Flamenco singer, guitarist and humorist.

== Biography ==
=== First Years ===
Emilio Jiménez Gallego was born in Melilla in 1923. He was a fan of Flamenco from childhood, and in 1939 at age fifteen he performed in public for the first time. He then went on to win seven consecutive singing competitions in different genres, including fandangos, soleás, tientos, polos and cañas. He became the most promising singer of flamenco in North Africa. Charming and a joker, he one day sang Flamenco in an Arabic style, and received such an ovation that he then decided to create the character of Emilio el Moro.
