= Carlos Sadness =

Spanish singer and composer

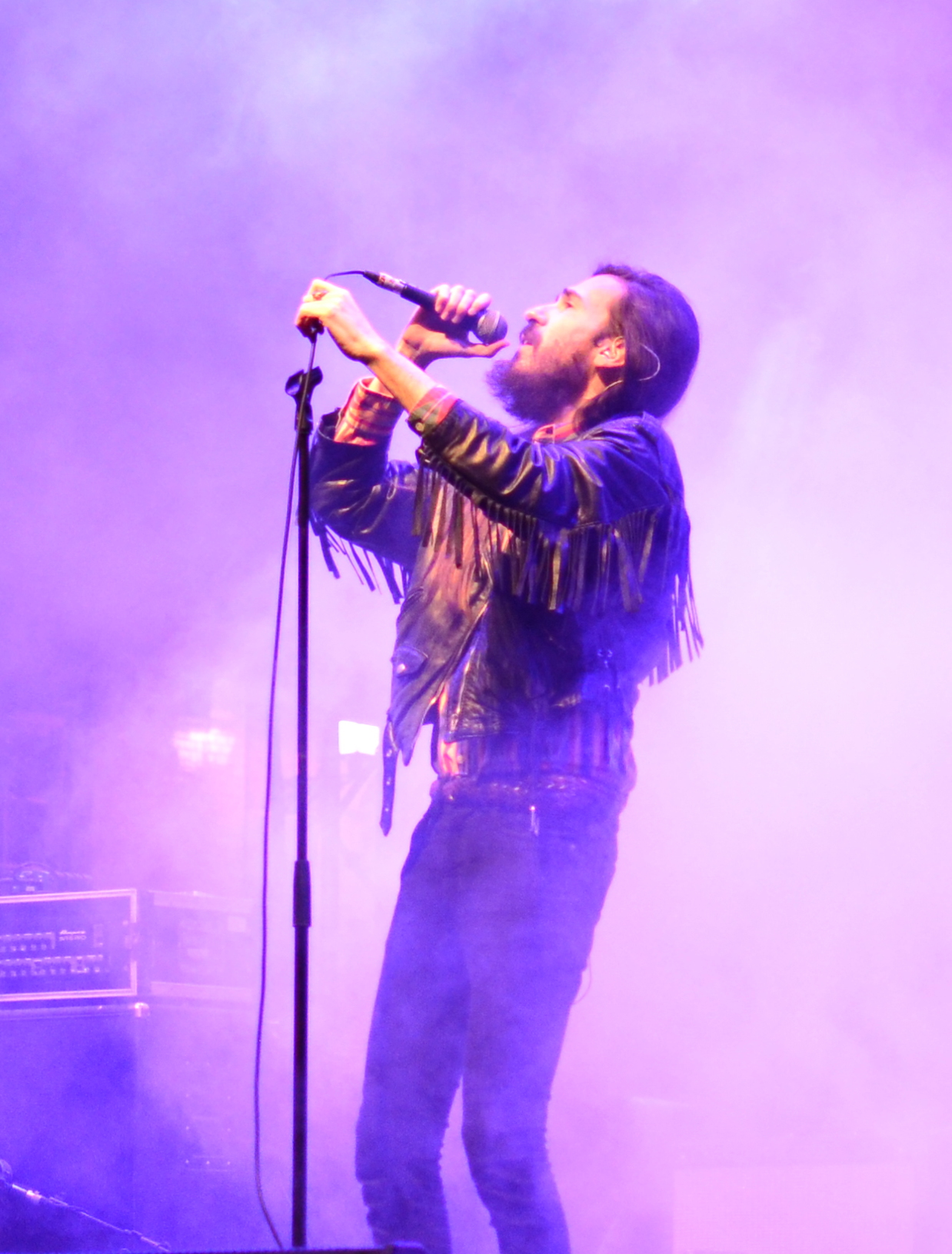

Background information
- Born: 31 March 1984 (age 41)
- Origin: Barcelona, Spain
- Genres: Indie, pop
- Occupations: Singer, illustrator
- Instrument: Voice/ukulele/acoustic guitar
- Years active: (Carlos Sadness): 2011 – present (as Shinoflow): 2002–2007
- Labels: Sony Music
- Website: Instagram Web

Carlos Sadness (born 31 March 1984) is a Spanish singer, songwriter and illustrator.

== Biography ==
He had been studying design while already uploading some of his songs onto Myspace. After a few years of touring underground and releasing his music through social media, he drew the attention of media becoming "one of the most important faces for 2009", according to El País. A few months later, he was commission to make a song for the film Brain Drain. That year he worked with Fernando Vacas (music producer of Russian Red) looking to develop his sound.

In 2010 Carlos met his first manager Pito Cubillas (Alaska, Héroes del Silencio), with whom he travelled to Los Angeles, where a series of dreams made him discover a new way of composing his songs, based on the instrumentalization and influences of indie and folk music. During this year, Carlos was invited to participate in a tribute album to Antonio Vega, El alpinista de los sueños, in homage to Héroes del silencio, Hechizo, in the album of Luis Eduardo Aute, Intemperie. By the end of that year, he signed with Sony Music Entertainment. In January 2011, he released his first EP Atraes a los relámpagos that helped position him in the national indie-pop scene. In November, he took part in El Intermedio, a Spanish TV programme of La Sexta channel, with a comedy sketch about Spanish politics, and by the end of the year he was nominated as "Best New Artist Record 2011" by Radio Televisión Española (RTVE).

In April 2012, he released his album Ciencias celestes and he finally used the name of Carlos Sadness. A personal and poetic album in which he musically reinvented himself without losing his personality. The day the album was released it appeared on the Spanish public TV channels (La 2 and 24 Horas). That year, the brand San Miguel Beer counted on him to star in its new advertising campaign "Ciudadanos en un lugar llamado mundo".

In 2015, he released his second album, La idea salvaje, and it was nº 1 in Fnac and ranked in 12th position in the list of the Spanish top sellers. The album was produced in Glasgow, Scotland, and counted with the collaboration of Santi Balmes and it is a conceptual album which turns around the idea of a space travel, as a metaphor for the estrangement between two people. For weeks, his songs were nº 1 in "shared songs" of Spotify and Sadness became one of the six indie artists with more influence on the Spanish summer festivals and closing almost every concert of his tour, including two dates in Madrid with sold out tickets: Teatro Barceló and Sala But. This same year, he was nominated in the ARC awards for the "Best Tour of Festivals" and in the VEVO Awards in the category of Spanish music video for "Bikini".

In 2016, he extended his tour to over 60 concerts and he was part of over 20 festivals while he was writing his first book Anatomías Íntimas, which launched in November that year. The book was the most pre-ordered book in Fnac from the announcement to its launching. That year was also his debut in Mexico at three consecutive sold-out shows in Lunario. In 2017, Sadness released a single with which he became the first Spanish 'indie' artist to exceed the 600,000 monthly playbacks on Spotify. He played in Vive Latino and did an American tour with 10 concerts. His song "Amor Papaya" with Caloncho was the most listened-to Spanish indie song on Spotify in 2017. The singer has issued the album Diferentes Tipos de Luz the following year, which started with the advance of 'Hale Bopp' on 12 January and with the release of the single "Longitud de Onda" on 2 February. Sadness' song "Aloha" was featured in the soundtrack of the video game FIFA 21.

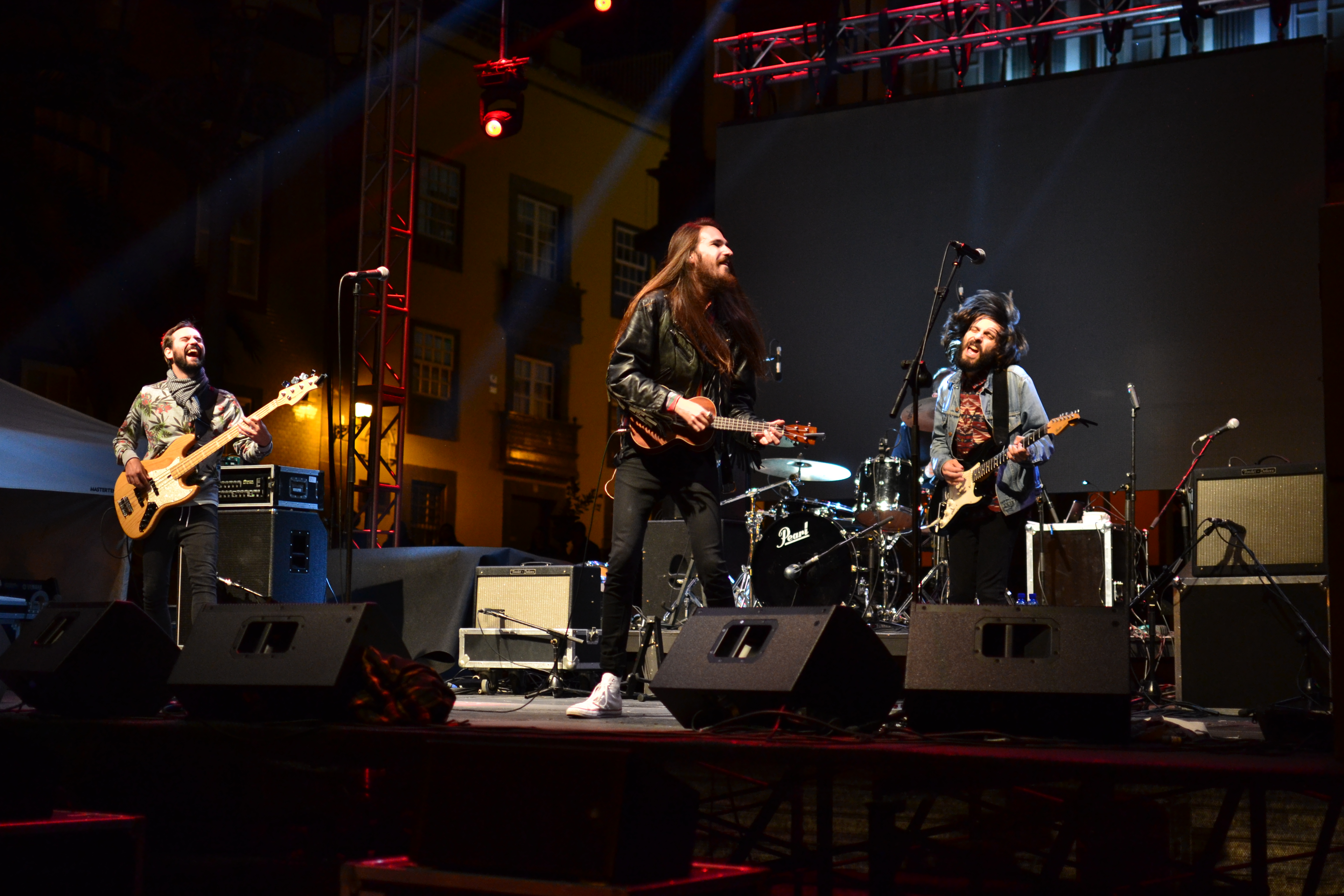

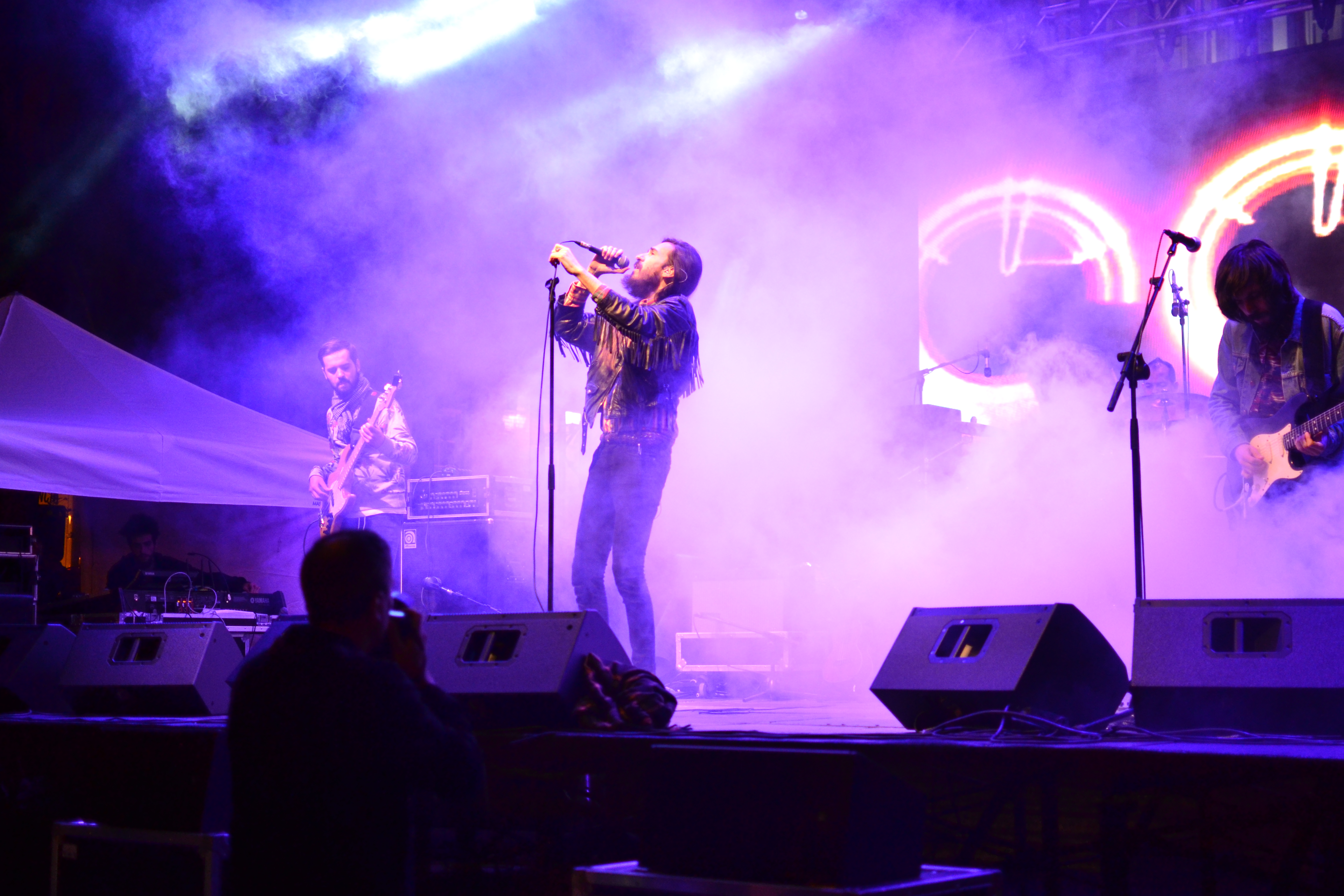

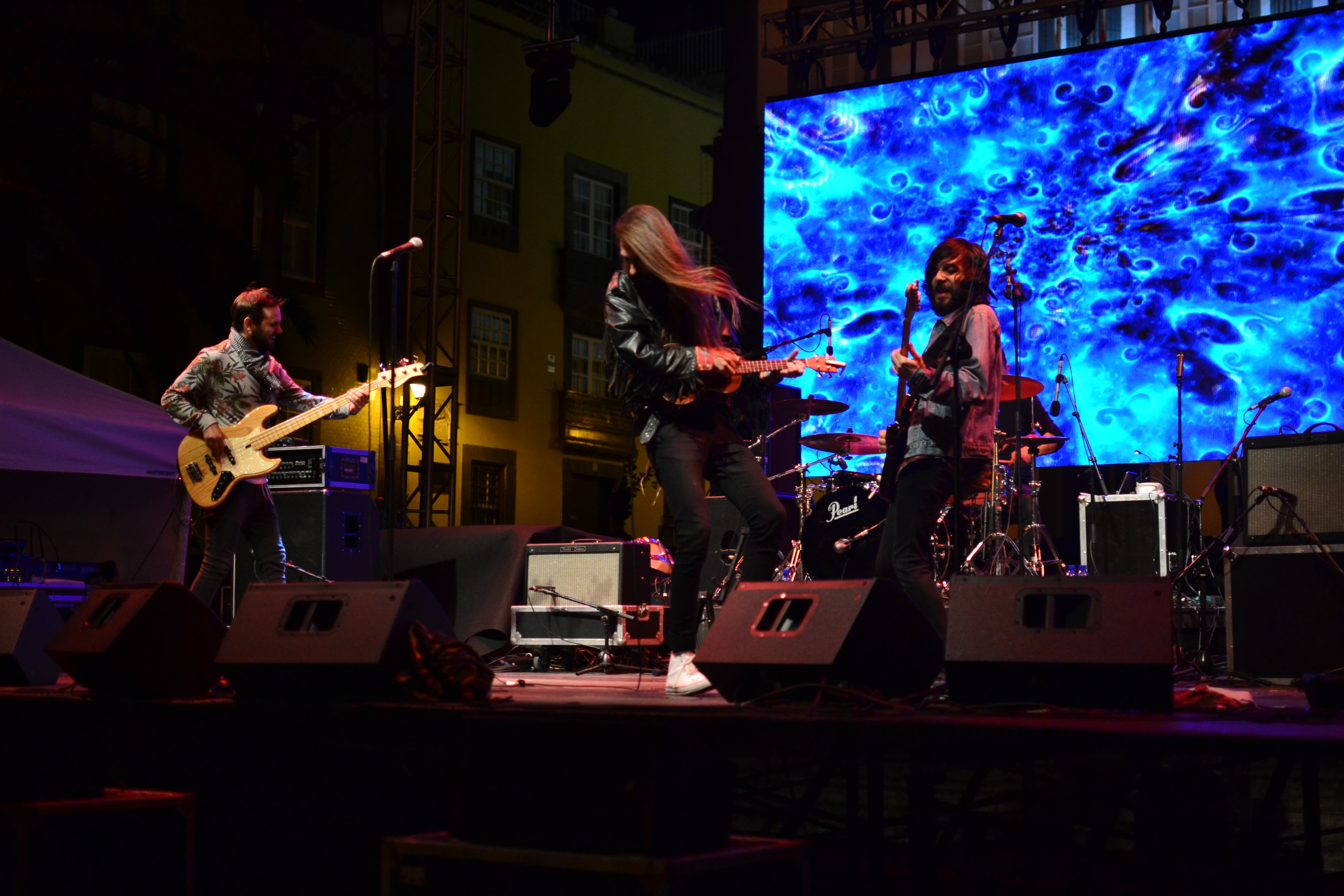

=== Style and influences ===
His lyrics were born from the experience of what he dreams and lives, built with a fantastic and imaginative character. Barcelona and the North of Huesca are some of the places where he finds inspiration. The trailer Monteperdido, as well as allusions to Montjuic shallow hill and Tibidabo mountain in his album "La idea salvaje", are one of the examples inspired by geography.

His musical taste includes groups such as Death Cab For Cutie, Simon and Garfunkel, Los Piratas or Joy Division. Munch, Kafka, as well as the impressionist authors are examples of his cultural preferences.

His song "Hoy es el día" was used for Walmart's spring-summer advertising campaign in the United States. He was also one of the artists of the advertising spot of San Miguel beer in 2012.

In 2009, he shared stage with Katy Perry in the Palau Sant Jordi in Barcelona and in the Palacio de los Deportes in Madrid. He also shared stage with the Spanish singer Bebe in her 2010–2011 tour.

=== Other activities ===
Before he started to fully engage with music, he worked as an illustrator and as an advertising designer. While working in advertising agencies, he did works for trademarks such as White Label, Eristoff Black or Carolina Herrera. In 2016, his book Anatomías Íntimas was published, where he served as both illustrator and writer. Since its announcement, the book remained at the top of Fnac's list of reserved books. The same year, he wrote a preface about the different points of view about love for the book Los novios de Gael of Sanz i Vila published by Ediciones Hidravión.

=== Discography ===
As Carlos Sadness

Album	Year
Atraes a los relámpagos (EP)	2011
Ciencias celestes (studio album)	2012
Monteperdido (EP)	2014
La idea salvaje (studio album)	2015
Diferentes tipos de luz (studio album)	2018

As Shinoflow

Album	Year
Tu príncipe azul destiñe (LP)	2002
Adelantando relojes (EP)	2005
El misterioso ciclo de tu pestañeo	2006
El presidente de los estados de ánimo (LP)	2007
Medias naranjas y otras mitades (EP)	2009

=== Books ===
Books	Year
Anatomías íntimas (text and illustrations)	2016

=== Notable collaborations ===
Group/author	Album	Song	Year
Miranda!	Fuerte	"Cálido y Rojo"	2017
Caloncho	Inédito	"Amor Papaya"	2017
Porta	Equilibrio	"Tela de araña"	2016
Love of Lesbian	La idea salvaje	"No vuelvas a Japón"	2015
Rubén Pozo (Pereza)	(single YouTube)	"Mátame ya"	2013
Jamie Cullum	Spot San Miguel/Momentum	"Everything you didn't do"	2012
Zahara	Ciencias celestes	"Au Revoir"	2012
Iván Ferreiro	Ciencias celestes	"Siempre esperándote"	2012
Russian Red	(rmx YouTube)	"Brave Soldier(Remix)"	2011
Luis Eduardo Aute	Intemperie	"Quiéreme"	2011
Bebe	Atraes a los relámpagos	"Se fue"	2010
Bebe	El alpinista de los sueños/Tributo a Antonio Vega	"Estaciones"	2010

== Singles / Videoclips ==
Album	Song	Year
Presidente de los estados de ánimo (as shinoflow)	"Amor descafeinado"	2007
Atraes a los relámpagos	"Fue tan importante"	2011
Ciencias celestes	"Hoy es el día"	2012
Ciencias celestes	"Celeste"	2012
Ciencias celestes	"Siempre esperándote" (with Iván Ferreiro)	2013
Monteperdido	"Monteperdido"	2014
Ciencias celestes	"Au Revoir" (with Zahara)	2014
La idea salvaje	"Qué electricidad"	2015
La idea salvaje	"Miss Honolulu"	2015
La idea salvaje	"Bikini"	2015
Groenlandia & Houdini	"Groenlandia"	2015
La idea salvaje	"Perseide"	2016
La idea salvaje	"Días Impares" (with Melissa Robles)	2017
Amor Papaya	"Amor Papaya" (with Caloncho)	2017
Diferentes Tipos de Luz	"Volcanes Dormidos"	2017
Diferentes Tipos de Luz	"Longitud de Onda"	2018
