= Corona Records =

American record label

Corona Records was a San Antonio-based label which helped establish the Tejano musical style. It was formed by Manuel Rangel, Sr. The label recorded most San Antonio-based Tejano artists of note, but the company kept no recording or sales ledgers. The label released several hundred records, and was active into the 1970s.

Valerio Longoria made his first records for Corona in an electrical repair shop in 1947, which was also Corona's first release, and stayed for two years with several regional hits, before signing to Ideal Records. Little Joe was signed to the label for a short time. Lydia Mendoza recorded several titles for the label between 1955 and 1966.
