= Guillermo Portabales =

- Born: José Guillermo Quesada Castillo; 6 April 1911; Rodas, Cuba
- Died: 25 October 1970 (aged 59) San Juan, Puerto Rico
- Genres: guajira, canción, tango, bolero, son
- Occupation: Singer
- Years active: 1928–1970
- Label: World Circuit

Guillermo Portabales (born José Guillermo Quesada Castillo; 6 April 1911 – 25 October 1970) was a Cuban singer-songwriter and guitarist who popularized the guajira style of Cuban music from the 1930s through the 1960s. His languid, melancholy, intensely lyrical guajiras and his elegant, stylish singing made him popular throughout Latin America, where he is still revered.

== Discussion of basic data ==
His father was José Quesada y Perez from Casteiro Oreste Spain and his mother was Marcela Estefania Castillo y Rodriguez from Vueltas Cuba. His birthplace was Rodas in the old province of Santa Clara (Las Villas). In what is now the Province of Cienfuegos. He grew up in Cienfuegos. His father died when he was about 8 years old, his mother then remarried a man whose last name was Portabales (the director of the Hospital in Cienfuegos), thus where his "stage name" came from. Portabales was married to a woman named Araminta and had a son Named Guillermo. Portabales had a brother named Manuel Eleuterio Quesada y Castillo. His brother was married to Sylvia Ester Ramirez y Gonzalez, who had four children Manuel Antonio Quesada (born in Caracas Venezuela in 1955), José Guillermo Quesada (Born in Caracas Venezuela in 1957), Sylvia Mercedes Quesada (Born in Caracas Venezuela in 1958) and Reynaldo Quesada (Born in Miami Florida in 1960).

As for his birthdate, in the original Cuban 1981 edition of the Dictionary of Cuban Music, Helio Orovio left Portabales out entirely. In the usual Soviet-style way, any opponents of the revolution get 'painted out' of history; but Portabales had left Cuba years before the Castro revolution, and most such people still retained their place in official Cuban history. Portabales had even recorded an album for Gema in Cuba in 1960, after the revolution but before Egrem took over all recording rights in Cuba. The later English translation reinstated such 'enemies of the state' as Celia Cruz (who was a determined opponent of the regime) and Portabales, giving 6 April 1914 as his date of birth. Cristobal Díaz Ayala gives 6 April 1911.

The date and place of his death also vary in sources. Orovio's English edition says 1961. This is definitely incorrect, because there are at least three recording session whose dates are later in the 1960s: in 1962/3 in Miami; in 1967/8 in New York, issued on Gema 3070 Viva Portabales; and, above all, in October 1970 in Puerto Rico, just a few days before his death (issued Gema 3086 Sones cubanos: Guillermo Portabales con Los Guaracheros de Oriente). This simple refutation throws doubt upon Orovio's other data, and has led to a general acceptance of Cristobal Díaz's version of 25 October 1970.

He did indeed die on 25 October 1970 while crossing a street in Puerto Rico late at night. He used to perform at a restaurant called Las Palmas in Isla Verde, Puerto Rico and while leaving the restaurant he was hit by a car and dragged several feet.

As for location, Orovio says Isla Verde, Cuba and Díaz says San Juan, Puerto Rico. It is almost unbelievable that the two versions should be so different, and again, it seems right to prefer Díaz, especially as the best-known Isla Verde is in Puerto Rico. Both agree that he died in a traffic accident; he was apparently hit by a car when leaving a gig at the Las Palmas restaurant.

== Career ==
At age 11, Portabales began work as a printer's assistant in Cienfuegos. In 1928, he made his radio debut on the station CMHI, and from then on divided his time between his work as a printer and performing.

In the beginning, Portabales sang a variety of styles — canción, tango, bolero, son — until he discovered that his listeners enjoyed the guajira the most. He thereby refined the style and developed his signature salon guajira style in which he depicted in bucolic terms the life of the Cuban guajiro (the rural campesino). In typical trovadore fashion, Portabales sang and played guitar, sometimes accompanied by a small group. His guajiras have a gentle, lilting rhythm, sometimes mixing with elements of the son or the bolero.

Portabales continued to perform and perfect the guajira until he went to Puerto Rico in 1937. There he became enamoured of the neighboring island and stayed there for two years, singing in theaters, clubs and on the radio. In 1939, he married Puerto Rican Arah Mina López, a journalist who joined him as he returned to Cuba in 1939. Over the years they toured together in Colombia, Venezuela, Ecuador, Peru, Panama, New York City, and Tampa.

After returning to Havana, Portabales performed on stage and radio with the Trio Matamoros. He also made a successful tour of United States and took an extended stay in Barranquilla, Colombia. In 1953, Portabales finally settled for good in Puerto Rico, where he continued to record and perform, with occasional tours of the continent. During the 1960s, he expressed his opposition to the Cuban Revolution in several discreetly poetic compositions.

== Impact ==
In 2006 the African group Kékélé released an album, Kinavana, that re-Africanized songs Portabales had composed or performed, giving them new lyrics in the Lingala language and playing them in a Congolese style. As a Washington Post writer Mark Jenkins said, the 2006 album "celebrates [Portabales], who died before learning that his music had become popular in Africa."

== Assessment ==
Portabales' early work is represented on Tumbao TCD 084 Guillermo Portabales: El creador de la guajira de salón 1937–1943: Al vaivén de mi carreta. It is this CD, with its liner notes, which may be the source of the incorrect dates.

His voice, and particularly his guitar technique, improved greatly with experience. This is quite clear from the recordings in his fifties, represented by World Circuit WCD 023 Guillermo Portabales, El Carretero. This includes examples from his three recording sessions in the 1960s

His style is on the Spanish side of creole in contrast to many other Cuban trova performers in the 20th century: his music is clearly in the tradition of the old Spanish-descent countryside people, the guajiros. His repertoire was originally wide, but he came to specialize in guajira-sons and laments, together with some guaracha-sons. With his smooth style, he was known as the creator of la guajira de salón. As a composer he was perhaps not so important as his rootsier compatriot, Ñico Saquito, but what he did compose was of high quality, and still is popular.

Three of his noteworthy compositions: El carretero; Nostalgia guajira; Cumbiamba; Cuando salí de Cuba(composed by the argentinian Luis Aguile in 1967) was one of his famous songs as well.
