= Premio Nacional de Música de Cuba =

Cuban Cultural Award

The Premio Nacional de Música is a Cuban cultural award, inaugurated in 1997 and presented annually by the Instituto Cubano de la Música. The prize honours Cuban musicians who live in Cuba for their contributions to the national music scene. It forms part of a range of awards under the rubric of Premios Nacionales de Cuba.

== List of winners ==
Year	Winner
2017	José Luis Cortés
2016	Enrique Alberto Bonne Castillo
2015	Beatriz Márquez Castro
2015	Guido López-Gavilán
2014	Leonardo Acosta Sánchez
2014	Sergio Vitier García Marruz
2013	César Pedroso Fernández
2013	Ángel Adriano Rodríguez Bolaños
2012	Roberto Arturo Carcassés Cuza
2011	Wilfredo Salvador Naranjo Verdecia
2010	Francisco Leonel Amat Rodríguez
2009	Teresa Fernández García
2008	Juan Adalberto Cecilio Álvarez Zayas
2007	Martha Emilia Valdés González
2006	Omara Portuondo Peláez
2006	Digna Guerra Ramírez
2006	María Teresa Linares Savio
2006	Federico Arístides Soto Alejo
2006	Roberto Valera Chamizo
2006	Juana Rivero Casteleiro
2005	Pablo Milanés Arias
2005	María Antonieta Henríquez González
2005	Rosalía Palet Bonavia
2005	Francisco Fernández Tamayo
2004	Narciso César Portillo de la Luz
2004	Adolfo A. Fernández González
2004	Jorge Luis Prats Soca
2004	Alfredo Diez Nieto
2004	Silvio Rodríguez Domínguez
2003	Juan Climaco Formell Cortina
2003	Luis Mariano Carbonell Pullés
2003	Celina González Zamora
2003	Manuel Duchesne Cuzán
2003	Domingo Faustino Aragú Rodríguez
2003	Lázaro Ross
2002	Juan Pedro Blanco Rodríguez
2002	Harold Gramatges Leyte-Vidal
2001	Eduardo Ricardo Egües Martínez
2001	Esther María de la Caridad Borja Lima
2001	Electo Silva Gaínza
1998	Dionisio Jesús Valdés Rodríguez
1998	Juan Leovigildo Brouwer Mezquida
1997	Isaac Noel Nicola Romero
