= Trio Matamoros =

Cuban trova music group

Trío Matamoros
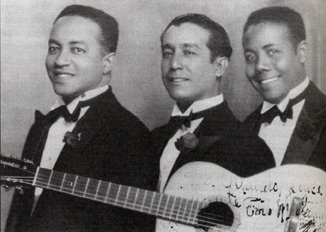
- Trío Matamoros, ca. 1930. From left to right: Rafael Cueto, Miguel Matamoros, Siro Rodríguez

Background information
- Origin: Santiago, Cuba
- Genres: Son cubano; bolero
- Years active: 1925-1961
- Labels: Victor, Seeco
- Past members: Miguel Matamoros; Rafael Cueto; Siro Rodríguez

The Trío Matamoros was a Cuban trova group. It was formed in 1925 by Miguel Matamoros (8 May 1894 in Santiago de Cuba – 15 April 1971; guitar), Rafael Cueto (14 March 1900 in Santiago de Cuba – 7 August 1991; guitar) and Siro Rodríguez (9 December 1899 in Santiago de Cuba – Regla, 29 March 1981; maracas and claves). All three were singers and composers. The group was originally called Trio Oriental, but changed their name to Trio Matamoros in 1928 after finding that a group called Trio Oriental already existed.

The Trío Matamoros played boleros and son. They toured all Latin America and Europe and recorded in New York. In 1934, they recorded the song "El desastre del Morro Castle" first artists to remember the tragedy of the Morro Castle, and they performed in Bogotá and Medellin, Colombia, among other places in Latin America. In 1940 Guillermo Portabales performed with the trio. Matamoros expanded the trio into a conjunto (Conjunto Matamoros) for a trip to Mexico and hired the young Beny Moré as singer from 1945 to 1947. They recorded many 78 rpm records and LPs; some of their output is available on CDs. The group were critically acclaimed for the harmony of their voices, and the quality of the lyrics.

The group is considered an important act in the rise of son music. Throughout the nearly four decades that it was active, the group re-configured itself into many musical variations and acts as a quartet, septet, orchestra, etc.

Miguel Matamoros was one of the most prolific composers of Cuban son. His first hit was "El que siembra su maíz" (He who sows his corn), followed by songs including "Lágrimas negras" (Black tears) and "Son de la Loma." The group, whose members stayed together for 35 years, announced their disbandment in May 1961. Their last concert had taken place in New York the year before.
