= Roberto Ledesma =

Cuban-born bolero singer

Roberto José Ledesma Gayton (born 24 June 1924) is a Cuban-born American bolero singer who emigrated to the United States in 1960. Among his well-known recordings is a version of "Son de la Loma". He turned 100 on 24 June 2024.
