= Xiomara Alfaro =

Cuban singer (1930–2018)

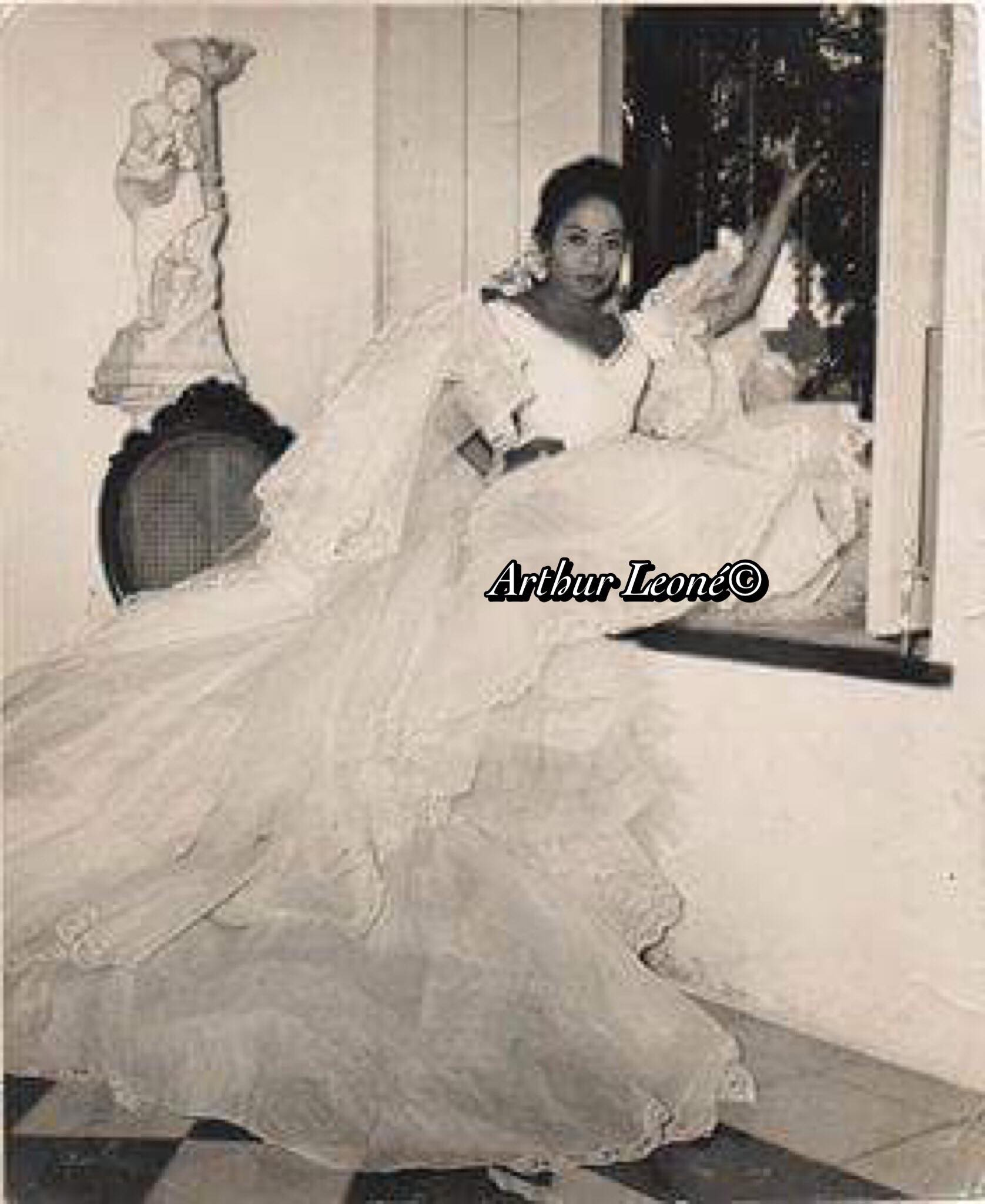
- Xiomara Alfaro as a young woman
- Born: May 11, 1930; Havana, Cuba
- Died: June 24, 2018; Coral Gables, Florida
- Occupation: Singer

Xiomara Alfaro (May 11, 1930 – June 24, 2018) was a Cuban coloratura soprano. Her interpretation of Cuban composer and pianist Ernesto Lecuona's "Siboney" was the composer's favorite.

== Early life ==
Alfaro was born in Havana. She was a musical child, and won a contest for young singers sponsored by Radio Suaritos; she regularly appeared on Radio Suaritos broadcasts, which led to further opportunities. Her sister Olympia Alfaro was also known a singer.

== Career ==
Alfaro was a star of the Cuban music scene of the 1950s. She was in the original cast of Batamú (1951), a musical revue by Obdulio Morales. She became famous as a singer of bolero music, with a clear, strong soprano voice well suited to the genre. She was known as "El Ruiseñor de la Cancion" (The Nightingale of Music) and as "La Alondra de la Cancion" (The Lark of Music).

Alfaro's film appearances included a vocal performance alongside the Katherine Dunham dancers in Mambo (1954), and a role in Olé…Cuba! (1957), which also featured fellow Afro-Cuban singer Celia Cruz. She made more than two dozen recordings for RCA Records and other labels.

"I'm a very spiritual person," she explained in a 2007 interview. "I try to transmit to my audience when I sing. God gave me a gift. And when God gives you something, you use it."

== Recordings ==
- Siboney (1957, with Chico O'Farrill and Ernesto Duarte)
- Xiomara Alfaro en Nueva York (with Joe Cain y su Orquestra)
- Xiomara Alfaro Sings International Flavors
- En Gira (1962)
- Siboney: Lo Mejor de Xiomara A)lfaro Vol. 1 (2004)
- Lamento Borincano: Lo Mejor de Xiomara Alfaro Vol. 2 (2007)
- Aquellas Canciones (2009)
- Xiomara Alfara, Cubana (2015 reissue)
- Besos en mi Sueños (2015 reissue)
- Perlas Cubanas (2015 reissue)

== Personal life ==
Alfaro was married to Panamanian pianist Rafael Benitez. She fled Cuba in 1960. She died in 2018, in Cape Coral, Florida, at the age of 88.
