= Un Junte para la Historia =

Live album by Haciendo Punto en Otro Son, Moliendo Vidrio, and Fiel a la Vega
- Released: November 29, 1998
- Recorded: November 1998
- Genre: Rock en Español; Nueva trova
- Length: ??:??

Un Junte para la Historia was a concert from three Puerto Rican bands: Fiel a la Vega, Haciendo Punto en Otro Son, and Moliendo Vidrio, celebrated in Puerto Rico on November 29, 1998. The concert was then released as a DVD and a CD.

The concert featured four sets. The first three sets consisted of each band presenting some of their hit songs. The last set, featured a "junte" (slang for get together) of all three bands performing hit songs from each other.

== Track listing ==
=== Haciendo Punto en Otro Son ===
- "Los Carreteros"
- "Vida Campesina"
- "Sal a Caminar"
- "Que Vivan Los Estudiantes"
- "Yolanda"
- "Cantares"
- Medley
- "La Muralla"

=== Moliendo Vidrio ===
- "La Montaña"
- "Sigue Caminando"
- "El Tambor"
- "De Ciales Soy"
- "Peyo Mercé"
- "El Gesto de la Abuela"

=== Fiel a la Vega ===
- Medley ("Resurrección", "Todo Cambia y Todo Sigue Igual", "Las Flores de Emilio", "Los Superhéroes", "De Pecho", "Bla, Bla, Bla" & "El Panal")
- "Al Frente"
- "Granos de Sal"
- "Septiembre, Río Piedras"

=== El Junte ===
- "El Son que traigo yo"
- "Las Mujeres de mi Patria"
- "Mujer de 26 años"
- "Canción del Pueblo"
- "El Wanabí"
- "Boricua en la Luna"

== Personnel ==
=== Fiel a la Vega ===
- Tito Auger - Lead Vocals, Rhythm guitar
- Ricky Laureano - Lead Guitar, vocals
- Jorge Arraiza - Bass guitar
- Pedro Arraiza - Drums
- Papo Román - Percussion

=== Haciendo Punto en Otro Son ===
- Silverio Pérez - Vocals, Guitar
- Tony Croatto - Vocals, Guitar
- Irvin García - Vocals, Percussion
- Josy LaTorre - Vocals

=== Moliendo Vidrio ===
- Gary Nuñez
- Sunshine Logroño
- Rosita Velázquez
- Iván Martínez
- Pedro Villalón
