= Fiel a la Vega (album) =

Studio album by Fiel a la Vega
- Released: 1996
- Recorded: Bayona Studio, Arecibo, PR
- Genre: Rock en español
- Length: ??:??
- Label: CPC Records
- Producer: Fiel a la Vega

Fiel a la Vega chronology
Fiel a la Vega (1996)	El Concierto Acústico (1997)

Singles from Fiel a la Vega
- 1. "Salimos de Aquí" Released: 1996; 2. "El Wanabí" Released: 1996

Fiel a la Vega is the first album by the rock en español band Fiel a la Vega, released in 1996. The album is still considered one of the most influential albums in rock en español.

== Release ==
"Salimos de Aquí" is the first single released to promote the album. It is considered one of their biggest hits. It was written by band singer Tito Auger. The title means "We Came From Here". The song is a call for Puerto Ricans to be proud of their culture and heritage. It features several references to Puerto Rican culture and society.

The band also released a video for "Salimos de Aquí". The video was directed by Paloma Suau and was recorded in a farm in the band's hometown of Vega Alta and Vega Baja in Puerto Rico. The video features cuts of Puerto Rican people and events intercalated with the band performing in the farm.

== Track listing ==
All songs written by Tito Auger, except where noted.

1. "Salimos de Aquí" – 6:32
2. "Las Flores de Emilio" (Auger, Ricky Laureano) – 6:11
3. "Mil Canciones" – 4:50
4. "Nada" (Laureano) – 1:45
5. "Los Superhéroes" – 6:49
6. "De Pecho" – 4:00
7. "Un Pueblo Durmiendo" – 6:31
8. "'86" – 7:29
9. "El Wanabí" – 5:08
10. "De Mi Casa y Mi Viento" (Auger, Laureano) – 7:05
11. "Una Plegaria Más" – 6:41

== Track information ==
- "El Wanabi" was written for the short film Una Noche en Hollywood (One Night in Hollywood) by Edmundo Rodríguez. It was recorded and mixed on March 9, 1996, by Candido Parilla, and mastered at Digital Recording Service. (This is written in the album's liner notes)

== Certification ==
On April 13, 1997, the album was certified gold for selling 50,000 units.

== Personnel ==
- Tito Auger - lead vocals, rhythm guitar
- Ricky Laureano - lead guitar, vocals
- Jorge Arraiza - bass guitar
- Pedro Arraiza - drums

=== Additional musicians ===
- Hiram Williams - cello ("Una Plegaria Más")
- Elliud - percussion ("Las Flores de Emilio")
- Papo Román - percussion ("El Wanabi")
