= Equilibrio (album) =

Studio album by Fiel a la Vega
- Released: February 9, 2010
- Genre: Rock en español
- Length: 45:44

Fiel a la Vega chronology
Desde el Comienzo: 1994–2004 (2005)	Equilibrio (2010)

Equilibrio is the fifth studio album by the rock en español band Fiel a la Vega. It was released independently on February 9, 2010.

== Concept ==
According to the band's founders and songwriters, Tito Auger and Ricky Laureano, the concept of the album and its title (which translated as "equilibrium") comes from their feelings towards the current state of their country, Puerto Rico. Lead singer Auger says about it that "things are a bit indecipherable. We are facing a future in which we have to make drastic changes and, in our way towards that, we feel we're walking on a wire trying to keep ourselves equilibrated while trying not to lose ourselves in the process." Among the situations they mentioned was the level of unemployment in the island.

The songwriting process started after the band released the compilation album Desde el Comienzo: 1994-2004 in 2005. According to Auger and Laureano, this period gave them the chance to write more cautiously, while arranging each song without the pressure of a record label. "We wrote 14 or 15 songs. It was a meticulous process, with a lot of communication, to make sure we had a representation of what we wanted as a group... it's a good album, more 'rocked'," said Auger and Laureano.

Laureano added that the group prefers to protect their lyrical and musical content, before "polluting it with decisions of leaders of the musical industry". Auger said that "it was a good moment to release an album" because, according to him, there was no genre dominating at the time.

== Track listing ==
1. "Monte" - 4:33
2. "Avísame" - 3:16
3. "Turísticamente Bien" - 5:23
4. "Aliviar el Camino" - 4:08
5. "Arena y Cal" - 3:47
6. "El Sol de Margara" - 4:35
7. "Con Cada Amanecer" - 4:44
8. "Canción de la Dignidad" - 4:18
9. "Equilibrio" - 3:52
10. "Evolución es Revolución" - 3:33
11. "Arena y Cal" (Acoustic) - 3:41

== Singles ==
The first single from the album was "Turísticamente Bien", released in early 2010.

The second single was "Arena y Cal", released in October. The band recorded a video for each version of the song, regular and acoustic, in October 2010 in the restaurant Aquí se puede in Old San Juan. The video was directed by Papo Nazario.

== Personnel ==
- Tito Auger - lead vocals, acoustic guitar, harmonica
- Ricky Laureano - lead and acoustic guitar, vocals, cuatro
- Jorge Arraiza - bass guitar, vocals, keyboards, percussion
- Pedro Arraiza - drums, harmonica
