= Teresa María =

Spanish singer (died 2025)

María Teresa Heras Garuz (1944 – August 31, 2025), better known as Teresa María, was a Spanish singer and voice actress.

== Life and career ==
Garuz was born in Garrapinillos, in Zaragoza. She moved to Barcelona, where she began her training as a singer. In 1962 she recorded her first album for the SAEF label, where she covered some international hits of the time. A year later she participated in the Mediterranean Song Festival with the song "En Roma", reaching the final of the contest.

In 1964 she participated in the Spanish national final to select the song and participants of the Eurovision Song Contest that was to be held in Copenhagen in the same year. The final was held within the framework of the Spanish Television program Gran parada. The winner was chosen through voting postcards. Due to public support, she won the contest together with the singer Michel, both performing the song "Caracola" by composer Fina de Calderón, but ultimately neither of them would represent Spain in the contest, as Spanish Television decided internally to send the Italian-Uruguayan trio Los TNT.

During the 1960s, she recorded a number of albums, whilst also working on the Spanish dubbing of the musical films, including Chitty Chitty Bang Bang and Doctor Dolittle among others.

=== Personal life and death ===
Garuz had a son, Daniel Carbonell Heras (born 6 August 1972), better known as musician Macaco.

Garuz died from complications of Alzheimer's disease in August 2025 at the age of 81.
