= Spain in the Eurovision Song Contest 1964 =

- Eurovision Song Contest 1964
- Participating broadcaster: Televisión Española (TVE)
- Country: Spain
- Selection process: Song: National final Artist: Internal selection
- Announcement date: Song: 31 January 1964

Competing entry
- Song: "Caracola"
- Artist: Nelly with Tim and Tony
- Songwriter: Fina de Calderón

Placement
- Final result: 12th, 1 point

Participation chronology

Spain was represented at the Eurovision Song Contest 1964 with the song "Caracola", written by Fina de Calderón, and performed by the band Los TNT credited as Nelly with Tim and Tony. The Spanish participating broadcaster, Televisión Española (TVE), selected its entry through a national final and, subsequently, the performers internally. The song, performed in position 16, placed twelfth out of sixteen competing entries with 1 point.

== Before Eurovision ==
=== Song national selection ===
Televisión Española (TVE) used its television show Gran parada to select its entry for the Eurovision Song Contest 1964. On 18 January 1964, the ten songs in competition were presented in a Gran parada episode hosted in Barcelona by Carmina Alonso and Ana María Solsona, and aired on TVE and on Radio Peninsular. Each song was presented twice by two different singers among: Alfredo Garrido, Lita Torelló, Lorenzo Valverde, Michel, Teresa María, Claudia, Gelu, Lolita Sevilla, Luis Gardey, and Tito Mora. They were accompanied by a 35-piece orchestra conducted by Rafael Ibarbia or a rhythm sextet conducted by Vicente Crespo. In addition to the competing entries, Isabelle Aubret –who won Eurovision for France in 1962– and The Blue Diamonds performed as guest artists.

Songs in competition
Song	Songwriter(s)
"Soy"	Salvador López Dols; José María Martí Bosch
"Torero"	Miguel Dochado Díaz
"Olé"	Carlos Céspedes; Manuel Clavero; Enrique E. Cofiner
"La niña del espejo"	Esteban San Julián; Antonio Nebreda Martín
"Llegaré"	Fernando María Sáenz; Ángel Martínez Llorente
"Estrellas en el agua"	Carlos Laporta; Isidro Solá
"Todo me da igual"	José Valero
"Luz de bengala"	Fina de Calderón
"Caracola"	Fina de Calderón
"El niño y el toro"	Fernando Portolés; Francisco Naranjo

The winning song was chosen by postal vote with a voucher printed in the magazine Tele-Radio. On 31 January 1964, the letters received were opened and the counting of the 5,304 valid vouchers was made. That same day it was announced that the winning song, with 3,100 votes, was "Caracola" that had been performed by Michel and Teresa María.

R/O	First Singer	Second Singer	Song	Votes	Place
1	Gelu	Lorenzo Valverde	"Soy"	201	6
2	Lolita Sevilla	Luis Gardey	"Torero"	410	3
3	Claudia	Tito Mora	"Olé"	103	8
4	Lolita Sevilla	Alfredo Garrido	"La niña del espejo"	639	2
5	Gelu	Tito Mora	"Llegaré"	243	5
6	Lita Torelló	Michel	"Estrellas en el agua"	97	9
7	Lita Torelló	Lorenzo Valverde	"Todo me da igual"	321	4
8	Lita Torelló	Michel	"Luz de bengala"	54	10
9	Michel	Teresa María	"Caracola"	3,100	1
10	Tito Mora	Claudia	"El niño y el toro"	136	7

=== Artist internal selection ===
After the song selection, TVE internally chose Los TNT, who had not taken part in it, to perform the song at Eurovision. The trio consisted of siblings Tim, Nelly, and Tony Croatto. As the rules in place at the time only allowed the participation of soloists and duos in the contest, TVE had to enter Nelly as soloists accompanied by Tim and Tony as backing singers, as "Nelly with Tim and Tony".

== At Eurovision ==
On 21 March 1964, the Eurovision Song Contest was held at the Tivolis Koncertsal in Copenhagen, Denmark, hosted by Danmarks Radio (DR), and broadcast live throughout the continent. Los TNT performed "Caracola" last in the running order, following Belgium. Rafael Ibarbia conducted the event's orchestra performance of the Spanish entry. A background scenery was designed for the occasion by Salvador Dalí. (Note: Using octopus ink, Dalí had painted a scene depicting a conch shell (caracola) between the tentacles of a giant octopus. The DR decorators reproduced the sketch, which they received from TVE, for the backing scenery of the Spanish performance. However, the background sceneries that were requested to the participating broadcasters were ultimately not used, nor were their delegations informed that they would not be used.) The song received a single point from Italy, coming twelfth in a field of sixteen.

TVE broadcast the contest in Spain on its television service with commentary by Federico Gallo. Radio Nacional de España (RNE) aired the contest deferred on Radio Nacional.

=== Voting ===
Points awarded to Spain
Score	Country
5 points	
3 points	
1 point	Italy

Points awarded by Spain
Score	Country
5 points	Austria
3 points	Denmark
1 point	France
