= Boricua en la luna =

"Boricua en la Luna"

Single by Roy Brown

from the album Árboles
- Released: 1987
- Recorded: January to February 1987
- Genre: Folk rock, nova trova
- Label: Lara-Yarí
- Songwriter(s): Juan Antonio Corretjer, Roy Brown

"Boricua en la Luna" is originally a poem by Juan Antonio Corretjer. Puerto Rican singer/songwriter Roy Brown popularized it by adapting it to song. It was first featured on the album Árboles, from Brown and Cuban singer Silvio Rodríguez and became one of Brown's most popular songs.

== Song history ==
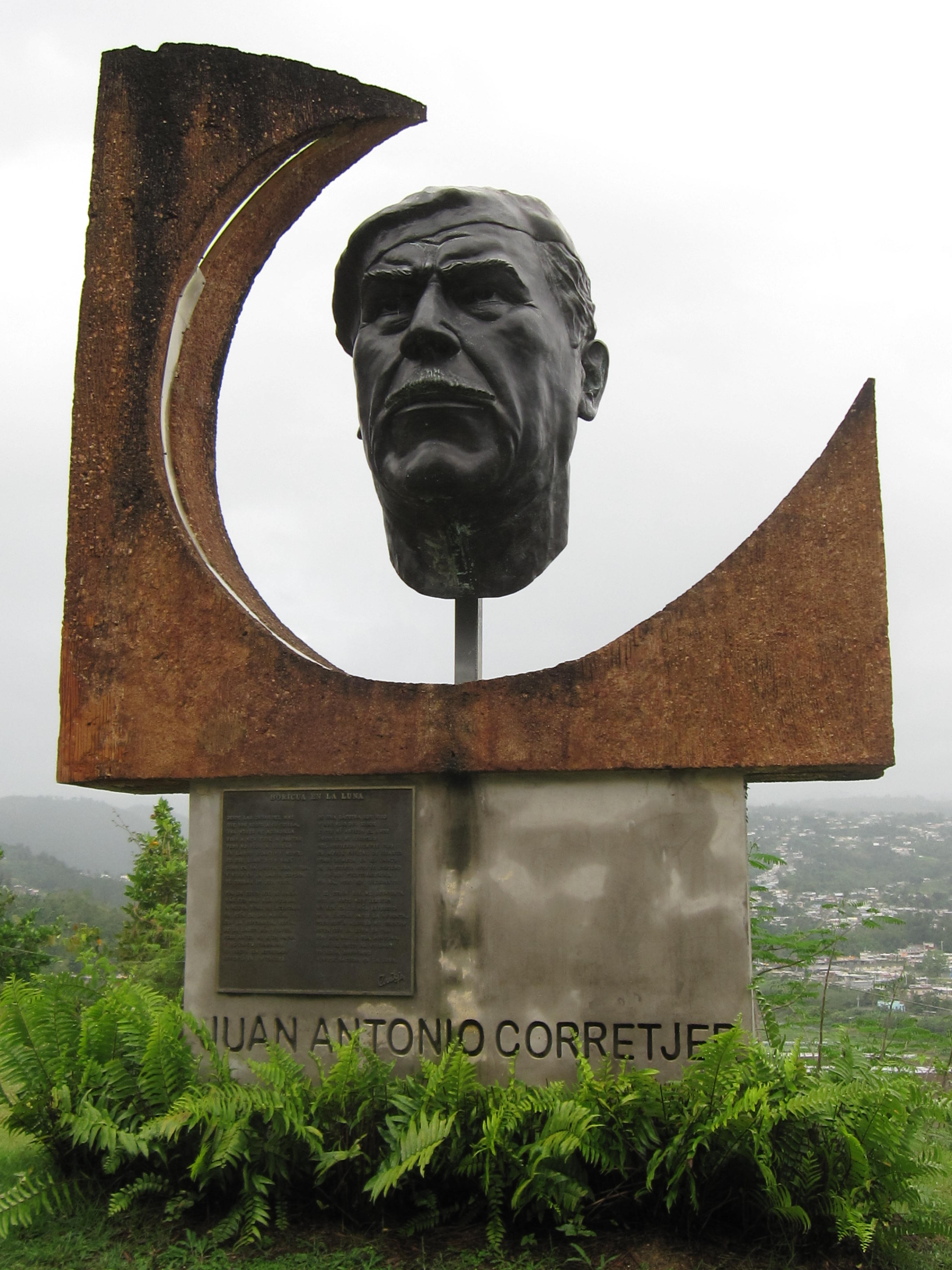
"Boricua en la luna" is a poem written by Juan Antonio Corretjer

On the booklet of Roy Brown's hits album Colección, he writes that the song "could've never been". Brown writes that in the late 70s, Corretjer handed him the lyrics, which he intended to be décimas, to see if Roy could come up with something. Brown, who at the time was moving to New York City, forgot about them. Several years later, when Corretjer died, Brown started looking for the décimas, but had a hard time finding them. A year later, Brown finally found them and says the music came "like a yank". However, he broke his finger playing basketball so he was unable to play it for a year. In 1987, he finally recorded it for the album Árboles.

== Lyrical interpretation ==
The song tells the story of a fictional character who recalls his heritage, product of the Puerto Rican migration to New York. He tells of his parents: a working-class father from Las Marías and an aspiring singer from Aguadilla, and how they migrated to the United States looking for better opportunities, resulting in his conception and birth on the mainland. Despite their aspirations, the song tells of the struggles of Puerto Rican immigrants in the States, which results in the death of his father and the mother's failed career.

The song continues with the protagonist becoming proud of his Puerto Rican heritage, thanks to the upbringing of his grandfather. This leads him to proclaim himself as Puerto Rican, regardless of his birthplace. In the conclusion of the song, the protagonist declares himself that he would be "borincano" even if he was born on the Moon. This last line is what gives the title to the song.

The song has become a symbol of national pride among some Puerto Ricans. The newspaper Primera Hora even used the title of the poem/song for a recurring series of articles on notable Puerto Ricans that have moved to the United States and other parts of the world.

== Other versions and covers ==
"Boricua en la Luna" has become one of Roy Brown's most popular songs. Because of this, the song is featured on several other albums. The song appears on the live album Distancias en Vivo and in the greatest hits album Colección.

In the mid-90s, Puerto Rican rock band Fiel a la Vega began covering the song during their live presentations. In July 1997, they recorded a live version of the song during their acoustic concert. In it, lead singer Tito Auger shares the vocals with Roy Brown himself. When they released the concert album, El Concierto Acústico, "Boricua en la Luna" was one of the singles promoted. The next year, their version of the song received a Tu Música Award for Song of the Year. The song has continued to be a staple of the band during their live shows.

In 1998, Fiel a la Vega joined local bands Haciendo Punto en Otro Son and Moliendo Vidrio for a series of concerts entitled Un Junte para la Historia. After three separate sets from each band, the three took the stage together for one last set. The last song from the concert was "Boricua en la Luna".

== See also ==
- Stateside Puerto Ricans
