= Arraiza =

Arraiza is a surname of Navarran Basque origin. Notable people with the surname include:

- Eunate Arraiza (born 1991), Spanish women's footballer
- Jorge Arraiza (born 1970), Puerto Rican musician
- Pedro Arraiza (born 1973), Puerto Rican musician
