= Palante el Mambo! =

Studio album by Diego Gutiérrez
- Released: 2018
- Studio: Egrem Studios
- Genre: Cuban music, Nueva Trova, Latin pop
- Label: Egrem Cuba
- Producer: Tony Rodríguez and Diego Gutiérrez

Diego Gutiérrez chronology
De cero (2007)	Palante el Mambo! (2018)	Piloto automático (2019)

Singles from Palante el Mambo!
- 1. "Filosofía de bar"

Palante el Mambo! is the second studio album by Diego Gutiérrez. He recreates in this album Cuban genres and rhythms from a very personal vision of songwriting, which earned him immediate attention from critics and audiences. It was nominated for the Latin Grammy Award for Best Tropical Fusion Album category at its 19th edition in 2018.

== Production ==
For this album, Diego Gutiérrez chose among his songs the most representative of Cuban genres, which notably differentiates this work from his previous release De cero, more focused on a pop-rock sound. He also opted for the arrangements by a pianist with experience in Cuban salsa music, arranger and pianist of the popular Havana D'Primera orchestra. This would give his songs the peculiar flavor of native rhythms, mixed with his composition influenced by Nueva Trova and Contemporary Cuban Song.

This album won Cubadisco Award in the Best Fusion Album category in 2018.

After being nominated for the Latin Grammy Awards, Gutierrez has been able to present this album on tours throughout Cuba and several countries.

== Track listing ==
All tracks are written by Diego Gutiérrez.

No.	Title	Length
1.	"Pa´lante el mambo"	3:47
2.	"Qué buena vida"	4:39
3.	"Contra la pared"	4:18
4.	"Felicidad"	3:22
5.	"Mira la TV"	4:19
6.	"Filosofía de bar"	4:36
7.	"Sólo otra canción"	3:53
8.	"Piénsatelo"	3:48
9.	"Sucu sucu sentimental"	4:15
10.	"Fin de la historia"	5:00

== Personnel ==
- Lyrics, music and main voice in all songs: Diego Gutiérrez.
- Record producer: Tony Rodríguez and Diego Gutiérrez.
- Arrangements: Tony Rodriguez
- Piano and keyboards: Tony Rodríguez
- Electric bass: Yandy Martínez
- Electric guitar: Roberto Gómez
- Drums: Oliver Valdés
- Güiro: Oliver Valdés (Tracks 1, 2, 3, 5, 6, 8 and 9)
- Congas: Adel González
- Trumpet: Alejandro Delgado (Tracks 1, 2, 3, 5 and 10)
- Trombone: Amaury Pérez (Tracks 1, 3, 5 and 10)
- Saxophone: Jamil Scherry (Tracks 1, 3, 5 and 10)
- Backing vocals: Yosvel Bernal (Tracks 1, 2, 3, 5, 6, 8, 9, and 10)
- Backing vocals: Merlin Lorenzo (2, 3, 4, 5, 7, 8, 9 and 10)
- Programming and beat-making: José A. Blanco "El Negro WadPro" (Tracks 1, 3, and 10)
- Whistles: Tony Rodriguez (Track 6)
- Melodic: Tony Rodriguez (Track 9)
- Voice sample in "Filosofía de bar": Rolando Laserie
- Guest artist in "Contra la pared": Francis del Río
- Recording: Eng. Merlin Lorenzo and Eng. Daelsis Pena
- Post-production: Eng. Merlin Lorenzo
- Mixing: Eng. José Raúl Varona
- Mastering: Eng. Daelsis Pena
- Executive Producer: Brenda Besada
- Photo shoot: Ivan Soca Pascual
- Visual concept: Mario David Cárdenas
