= Diego Gutiérrez (singer-songwriter) =

Cuban singer-songwriter (born 1974)

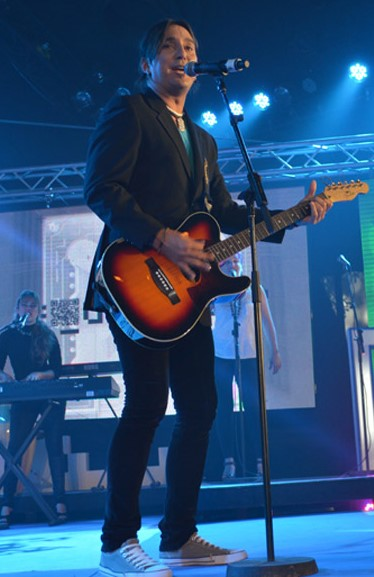

Background information
- Born: Diego Gutiérrez Abreu; Ciego de Ávila
- Origin: Cuba
- Genres: Latin pop; nueva trova
- Occupations: Singer-songwriter
- Instruments: Guitar; voice
- Years active: 1994–present
- Label: Egrem
- Member of: National Academy of Recording Arts and Sciences; Latin Academy of Recording Arts & Sciences
- Website: diegogutierrezcuba.com

Diego Gutiérrez (born September 25, 1974) is a Cuban singer-songwriter. In 2018, Gutiérrez was nominated for his album Palante el Mambo! to the Latin Grammy Award for Best Tropical Fusion Album.

== Early years ==
Diego Gutiérrez was born in Ciego de Ávila, where he lived during his childhood and adolescence. His brothers taught him to play the guitar, being themselves self-taught, and soon he began to sing the Trova Tradicional Cuban classics and also the songs of the Nueva Trova movement. Since he was little he got the influences of Cuban country and popular music through the old vinyls listened at home, which marked his compositions to come.

He began to write his own songs at the Central University of Las Villas, where he found a powerful cultural movement which inspired and drove him to think seriously in developing his musical career, while studying English Language and Literature. First, he got known by a growing audience through amateur musicians festivals, where he won several awards and later through concerts and tours around his country.

== Career ==
In 1997, he founded together with other fellow troubadours in Santa Clara the site of singing-songwriting called La Trovuntivitis, based in El Mejunje. This is an iconic cultural Center in Cuba, from where new generations of musicians, singer-songwriters and artists have emerged. Also around the same year they all together founded the national festival of trovadours "Longina".

He has been invited to share the stage with well-known singer-songwriters from Cuba like Carlos Varela, David Torrens, Santiago Feliú among other important musicians and participated in a concert invited by Manu Chao, together with La Trovuntivitis, as part as a Cuban tour by this artist.

In 2006, Gutiérrez recorded his first studio album titled De cero which received three nominations and two Cubadisco Awards.

He has participated as an invited musician in the World Festival of Youth and Students in Algiers (2001) and in Caracas (2005). He was invited to the 2009 edition of Barnasants International singer-songwriters festival in Barcelona and later performed a series of concerts in Sevilla, Valencia and Madrid.

For his second studio album titled Palante el Mambo! he received a Cubadisco Award and a nomination to the Latin Grammy Awards in 2018.

In 2019, he launched his third studio release titled Piloto automático.

As a result of his work throughout the years putting into music the verses of various writers from Villa Clara, in 2021 Diego Gutiérrez released his more recent album Viaje al Centro de la Tierra.

His most recent release is the studio album Primeros auxilios, launched in February 2025.

Gutiérrez has brought his work to United States, Spain, United Kingdom, Argentina, Switzerland, Mexico, Venezuela, Cyprus, Uruguay, Algeria and Bolivia as a part of tours, festivals and concerts.

He is a member of the Latin Academy of Recording Arts & Sciences.

== Discography ==
=== Studio albums ===
- 2006: De cero
- 2018: Palante el Mambo!
- 2019: Piloto automático
- 2021: Viaje al Centro de la Tierra
- 2025: Primeros auxilios

=== Live album ===
- 2008: Demasiado Diego Recorded live in Centro Pablo de la Torriente Brau, La Habana.

=== Various artists albums and anthologies ===
- 2001: Trov@nónima.cu
- 2003: Acabo de soñar, poems of José Martí sung by young Cuban troubadours
- 2005: A guitarra limpia. Antología 4 (collective work)
- 2006: Te doy una canción Vol.1, tribute to Silvio Rodríguez
- 2007: Décimas del gato Simón, poems by Josefina de Diego.
- 2009: Del verso a la canción various artists
- 2018: La Trovuntivitis
- 2022: La Nueva Trova y más. 50 años, Vol.9

== Awards and nominations ==
- A Latin Grammy Award is an accolade by the Latin Academy of Recording Arts & Sciences to recognize outstanding achievement in the music industry.

Latin Grammy Awards 2018
Nominee/ work	Award	Result
Palante el Mambo!	Tropical Fusion	Nominated

- Cubadisco is the most important music festival and awards event celebrating Cuban music in this country and every year it recognizes the achievements in Cuban discography.

Cubadisco Awards
Year	Nominee/ work	Award	Result
2007	De cero	*Ópera prima *Trova-pop-rock * Video clip	Won *Trova-Pop-Rock * Best Video Clip
2008	Demasiado Diego (Live)	Trova	Nominated
2009	Del verso a la canción (various artists)	* Album notes. * Trova	Won * Album notes * Trova
2018	Palante el Mambo!	Fusion	Won
2021	Piloto automático	Trova-Pop-Rock	Nominated

- The Lucas Awards (Spanish: Premios Lucas) are awarded in Cuba for best music video.

Lucas Awards 2015
Year	Nominee/ work	Award	Result
2015	El cinematógrafo (video clip)	• Trova • Visual effects • Art direction • Opera prima. • Animation	Won • Best video Trova •Best video Visual effects
