= De cero =

Studio album by Diego Gutiérrez
- Released: 2007
- Studio: Abdala Studios
- Genres: Pop-rock, folk, Nueva Trova, Latin pop
- Labels: Unicornio, Cuba
- Producer: Elmer Ferrer

Diego Gutiérrez chronology
Demasiado Diego (2006)	De cero (2007)	Palante el Mambo! (2018)

Singles from De cero
- 1. "En la Luna de Valencia"; 2. "Quién"

De cero is the debut album by Diego Gutiérrez. Its arrangements and sonority range from pop-rock and latin pop to Nueva Trova and cuban music. In 2007, it won three nominations and two Cubadisco Awards in the category of Best Album of Trova-Pop-Rock and Best Video Clip for its single En la Luna de Valencia.

== Production ==
De cero was recorded in the Abdala Studios (Havana, Cuba) with a small ensemble of musicians and it represented a turn over in Diego Gutiérrez ´s career, because of the way his songs were presented to the audience. The songs in the album were composed through his guitar alone and with the new arrangements his work reached a whole new level regarding musical expression, which was a pleasant surprise for his fans.

Record producer Elmer Ferrer, along with his band and that time, brought pop-rock sounds and jazz harmonies to Gutiérrez work, and an unprejudiced approach to it, which contributed to this debut album's success.

== Track listing ==
All tracks are written by Diego Gutiérrez.

No.	Title	Length
1.	"Próximo zarpazo"	3:59
2.	"De vuelta"	4:32
3.	"Mañana será"	3:21
4.	"En la Luna de Valencia"	3:51
5.	"Siguiendo los cometas"	3:52
6.	"Entre los flashes"	2:44
7.	"Sabor salado"	3:28
8.	"Adriana"	2:52
9.	"Sin mi mitad"	4:11
10.	"Quién"	3:51
11.	"Ostra"	4:04

== Personnel ==
- Vocals, acoustic guitar: Diego Gutiérrez
- Electric guitar, acoustic guitar: Elmer Ferrer
- Bass: Juan Pablo Dominguez
- Drums: Amhed Mitchel
- Piano and keyboards: Alexis Bosch
- Percussion: Francois Zayas
- Trumpet: Alexander Abreu
- Backing vocals: Rochy y Hakely Nakao
- Record producer: Elmer Ferrer
- Executive producer: Lecsy González
