= Demasiado Diego =

Live album by Diego Gutiérrez
- Released: 2006
- Recorded: Pablo de la Torriente Brau Cultural Center
- Genre: folk, Nueva Trova, Cuban music
- Label: A guitarra limpia Cuba
- Producer: Diego Gutiérrez

Diego Gutiérrez chronology
Demasiado Diego (2006)	De cero (2007)

Singles from Demasiado Diego
- 1. "Sabor salado" Released: 2006

Demasiado Diego is a live album by Diego Gutiérrez. It was recorded from a concert Diego gave at the Pablo de la Torriente Brau Cultural Center in Havana, Cuba, as part of the series of Trova recitals called A guitarra limpia. In this recording, Gutiérrez uses a small acoustic format and only with his guitar, showing his songs in the purest style of Nueva Trova.

== Track listing ==
All songs are written by Diego Gutiérrez

No.	Title	Writer(s)	Length
1.	"A guitarra limpia (Instrumental)"		0:37
2.	"Entre los flashes"		3:34
3.	"La fiebre del oro"		3:11
4.	"Brazos en cruz"		3:46
5.	"Ella cuenta la historia"		2:51
6.	"Muchacha entre castillos"		4:17
7.	"Felicidad"		3:45
8.	"Sorry"		3:34
9.	"Carta de Penélope a Odiseo"	Diego Gutiérrez – Edelmis Anoceto	4:14
10.	"A many splendored thing"	Diego Gutiérrez – Sigfredo Ariel	2:27
11.	"Sabor salado"		3:25
12.	"Quién"		4:05
13.	"El Cinematógrafo"		4:16
14.	"Cuerda floja"		3:10
15.	"En la Luna de Valencia"		4:32
16.	"Mando a distancia – Bonus track –"		2:27

== Personnel ==
- Vocals, acoustic guitar on all tracks: Diego Gutiérrez
- Electric guitar, acoustic guitars and backing vocals: IT Duo
- Minor percussion: Ariel Marrero
- Backing vocals: Rochy and Hakely Nakao
- Record producer: Diego Gutiérrez
- Executive producer: Centro Pablo de la Torriente Brau
