= Papo =

Papo is a masculine given name and nickname. It is also used as a surname. It may refer to:

== Surname ==
- Eliezer Papo (1785–1828), rabbi and writer in the Ottoman Empire
- Hope Papo, South African politician
- Izidor Papo (1913–1996), Austro-Hungarian surgeon, officer, military medical chief and academician
- Roza Papo (1914–1984), Yugoslav physician and general
- Seyran Papo (born 1988), German politician

== Given name ==
- Papo Colo (born 1946), Puerto Rican performance artist, painter, writer and curator
- Papo Lucca (born 1946), Puerto Rican musician

== Nickname ==
- Alfredo Alejandro Carrión (born 1948), Puerto Rican politician
- Petrus Compton, 21st century Saint Lucian politician
- Jose Garcia Cosme (1957–2019), better known as Papo Cachete, Puerto Rican convicted drug dealer
- Juan "Papo" Franceschi (c. 1946–1990), Puerto Rican sprinter
- Papo Román (born 1957), Puerto Rican musician
