= List of Latin music genres =

The earliest subgenres of Latin music is the corrido, a subgenre originating from popular music or Latin pop; a subclass of Latin music. Corrido music had its beginnings in Iberian folk in medieval Europe. The genre shared similarities to medieval cancioneros, through the European colonization of the Americas in the 15th century and the slave trade that followed, the lyrics were romanticized with heroic figures as the song's protagonist. Although the term "Latin music" varies between sources, the general consensus is that of genres originating in Latin America, the United States, and Iberian Peninsula, or music in Spanish. Although subgenres changes classification over time and various genres are clustered in subclasses of larger scopes, this timeline does not include regionalized identities of Latin music (e.g., "Dominican merengue", "Chilean folk", and "Puerto Rican salsa" for an example) are excluded in this list as they share or are under the same umbrella of their respective genres with slightly varying differences. Latin music is vastly large and it is impossible to include every subgenre on any list. Latin music shares a mixture of Indengious and European cultures, and in the 1550s included African influence. In the late 1700s, popular European dances and music, such as contradanzas and danzones, were introduced to Latin music. Through the 1800s, former colonies of Spain achieved independence and began performing narrative songs that were of national and local interest. The polka and accordion were introduced to Latin music in the 1860s, while Rosendo Mendizábal's "El Enterriano" (1897) became the first tango recording.

== Subgenres of Latin music ==
Genre	Subclass	Genre originated	Date of origin	Locale of origin	Notable artists
Merengue	Tropical music	Uncertain. It has been theorized to have originated from Hatian mereng, and an Afro-Cuban dance called the upa.	The genre possibly originated in the mid-1800s, or roughly around 1844 (see Dominican War of Independence).	Uncertain, theorized from Haiti (Haitian France) and/or Africa (Bantu people of Madagascar). (Note: According to various musicologists and historians, Dominicans often downplay, ignore, or deny that the genre originated from Haiti as well as downplaying, ignoring, and denying any Haitian involvement in the development of merengue music. Dominican society claims the genre originated in the Dominican Republic, though Puerto Rico, Cuba, and Haiti, have claimed that the genre originated in their homelands.)	Juan Luis Guerra • Elvis Crespo • Olga Tañon • Manny Manuel
Salsa	Tropical music	Cuban son, New York jazz.	1950s	New York City. (Note: Both Puerto Rico and Cuba have claimed the genre originated in their territories.)	Celia Cruz • Hector Lavoe • Willie Colon • Marc Anthony
Trova	Tropical music	Spanish folk music and nueva canción.	1953 (see Cuban Revolution)	Cuba	María Teresa Vera • Silvio Rodriguez • Noel Nicola • Carlos Varela
Bolero	Tropical music	Spanish folk	18th century	Mallorca	María Teresa Vera • Silvio Rodriguez • Noel Nicola • Carlos Varela
Latin pop	Latin pop	Pop music (American pop, Chicano rock), freestyle music, and traditional Latin music.	late-1950s, 1960s	United States (Miami and New York City), Latin America	Ritchie Valens • Ricky Martin • Enrique Iglesias • Shakira
Bachata	Tropical music	Cuban bolero (guitar bolero), African music.	1960s	Dominican Republic.	Luis Segura • Melida Rodriguez • Aventura • Prince Royce
Banda	Regional Mexican	Early ranchera music.	Late-20th century.	Mexico.	Jenni Rivera • Julión Álvarez • Juan Gabriel • Ana Bárbara
Latin jazz	Latin pop	jazz, Spanish tinge	1910s.	United States.	Tito Puente • Machito • Antonio Carlos Jobim • Magos Herrera
Tejano	Regional Mexican	Traditional Mexican (conjunto, musica nortena, corridos), American pop.	20th century.	Texas (South Texas).	Selena • Bruno Villareal • La Mafia • Emilio Navaira
Reggaeton	Latin urban	Reggae, hip-hop, Spanish Caribbean music, disco	Late-1990s.	Puerto Rico.	Daddy Yankee • Don Omar • Ivy Queen • J Balvin
Mariachi	Regional Mexican	Waltz, polka, bolero	1920	Mexico.	Vicente Fernandez • Lola Beltran • Antonio Aguilar • Pedro Infante

== See also ==
- Latin American music in the United States
- Women in Latin music

== Bibliography ==
- Austerlitz, Paul (1997). Dominican Music and Merengue, and Dominican Identity (1st ed.). Temple University Press. ISBN 1566394848.
- Sellers, Julie A. (2004). Merengue and Dominican Identity: Music as National Unifier. McFarland Press. ISBN 078641815X.
- Brill, Mark (2017). Music of Latin America and the Caribbean. Routledge. ISBN 978-1351682305.
- Waxer, Lise (2013). Situating Salsa: Global Markets and Local Meanings in Latin Popular Music. Routledge. ISBN 978-1135725419.
- Moore, Robin D. (2006). Music and Revolution: Cultural Change in Socialist Cuba. University of California Press. ISBN 0520247108.
- Clark, Walter Aaron (2013). From Tejano to Tango: Essays on Latin American Popular Music. Routledge. ISBN 978-1136536878.
- Stavans, Ilan (2014). Latin Music: Musicians, Genres, and Themes. ABC-CLIO. ISBN 978-0313343964.
- Rodriguez, Arturo (2005). Traditional Afro-Cuban Concepts in Contemporary Music. Mel Bay Publications. ISBN 1610658884.
- Rondón, César Miguel (2010). The Book of Salsa: A Chronicle of Urban Music from the Caribbean to New York City. University of North Carolina Press. ISBN 978-0807886397.
- Miguel, Guadalupe (2002). Tejano Proud: Tex-Mex Music in the Twentieth Century. Texas A&M University Press. ISBN 1585441880. - Read online, registration required
- Torres, George (2014). Encyclopedia of Latin American Popular Music. ABC-CLIO. ISBN 978-0313087943.
- Rivera, Raquel Z.; Marshall, Wayne; Hernandez, Deborah (2010). Reggaeton. Duke University Press. ISBN 978-0822392323.
- Smith, Jessie C. (2010). Encyclopedia of African American Popular Culture. ABC-CLIO. ISBN 978-0313357978.
- Nieto, John; Phillips, Bob (2005). Mariachi Philharmonic, Mariachi in the Traditional String Orchestra: Viola. Alfred Music Publishing. ISBN 0739038613.
- "Ranchera Music". don Quijote. don Quijote S.L.
