= Lo Nuestro Awards =

Spanish-language awards show honoring the best of Latin music

- Current: Premio Lo Nuestro 2026
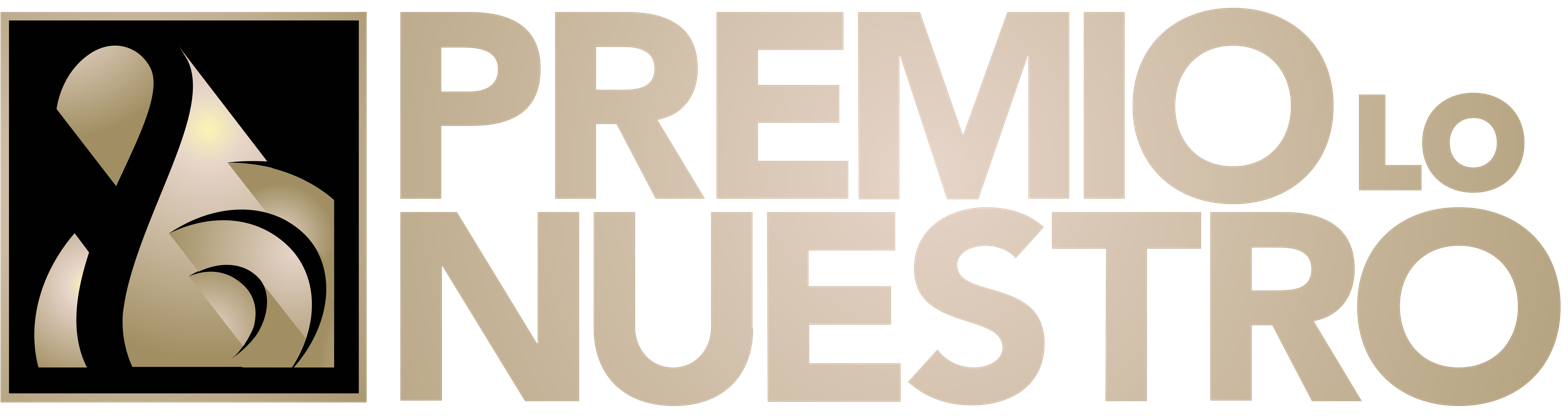
- Awarded for: recognition of the most talented performers of Latin music
- Country: United States
- Presented by: Univision (USA); Las Estrellas (Mexico); TeleOnce (Puerto Rico)
- First award: 1989
- Website: www.univision.com/shows/premio-lo-nuestro

The Lo Nuestro Awards or Premios Lo Nuestro (Spanish for "Ours") is a Spanish-language awards show honoring the best of Latin music, presented by TelevisaUnivision, and is carried by its Univision network in association with its related radio stations known as the Uforia Audio Network.

The awards ceremony features famous Latino actors, musicians and show business personalities. The show is broadcast all over the Americas. In February 2006, Univision announced that closed captioning in English would be offered for the first time in the history of the broadcast. The 2013 edition, which officially marked its 25th anniversary on the network, was dedicated to singer Jenni Rivera after her death in December 2012.

== Background ==
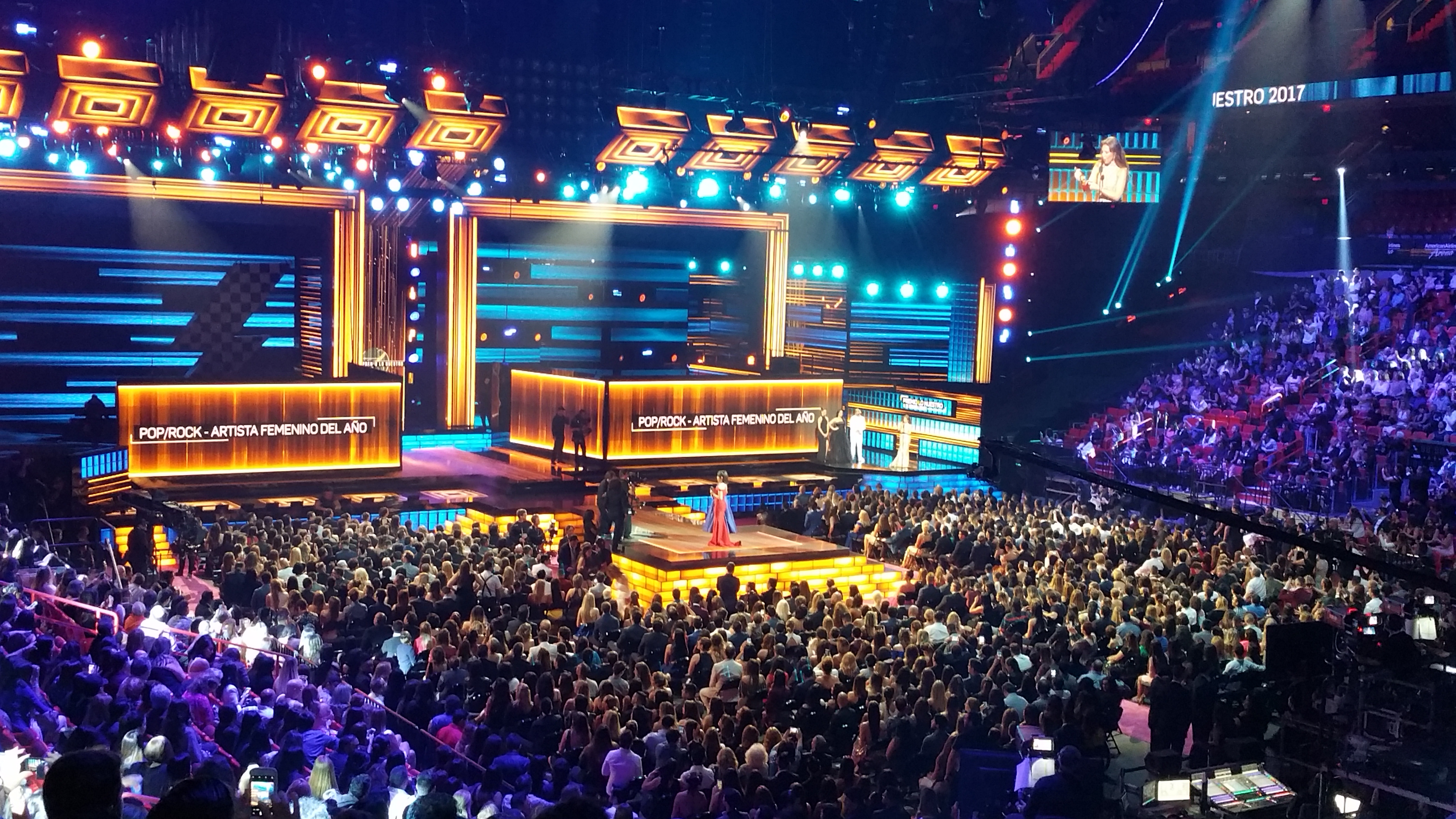
Stage for Lo Nuestro Awards of 2017

In 1989, the Lo Nuestro Awards were established by Univision, to recognize the most talented performers of Latin music. The nominees were initially selected by Univision and Billboard magazine, and the winners chosen by the public. Nominees and winners for the Lo Nuestro Awards were selected by a voting poll conducted among program directors of Spanish-language radio stations in the United States and the results were tabulated and certified by the accounting firm Arthur Andersen. The trophy awarded is shaped like a treble clef. The categories included were for the Pop, Tropical/Salsa, Regional Mexican and Music Video fields before the 2000 awards, from 2001 onwards categories were expanded and included a Rock field; for the Regional Mexican genre a Ranchera, Grupero, Tejano and Norteño fields were added; and Traditional, Merengue and Salsa performances were also considered in the Tropical/Salsa field. Before the Latin Grammy Awards inception, the Lo Nuestro Awards were considered as the Grammy Award equivalent for Latin music. Therefore, the Lo Nuestro ceremony was advanced from May to February since the 1st Latin Grammy Awards were held in September, 2000. The eligibility period for songs to be nominated are from October 1 to September 30.

== Ceremonies ==
Date	Ceremony	Venue	Host city	Host(s)
May 31, 1989	Premio Lo Nuestro 1989	James L. Knight Center	Miami, Florida	Lucy Pereda, Antonio Vodanovic
May 24, 1990	Premio Lo Nuestro 1990	James L. Knight Center	Miami, Florida	Celia Cruz
May 23, 1991	Premio Lo Nuestro 1991	James L. Knight Center	Miami, Florida	Plácido Domingo, Juan Gabriel
May 14, 1992	Premio Lo Nuestro 1992	Caesars Palace	Las Vegas, Nevada	Gloria Estefan
May 20, 1993	Premio Lo Nuestro 1993	James L. Knight Center	Miami, Florida	Armando Manzanero
May 19, 1994	Premio Lo Nuestro 1994	James L. Knight Center	Miami, Florida	Emilio Estefan
May 18, 1995	Premio Lo Nuestro 1995	James L. Knight Center	Miami, Florida	Julio Iglesias
May 9, 1996	Premio Lo Nuestro 1996	James L. Knight Center	Miami, Florida	Marco Antonio Solis
May 8, 1997	Premio Lo Nuestro 1997	James L. Knight Center	Miami, Florida	Mariachi Vargas de Tecalitlán
May 14, 1998	Premio Lo Nuestro 1998	James L. Knight Center	Miami, Florida	Los Panchos
May 6, 1999	Premio Lo Nuestro 1999	James L. Knight Center	Miami, Florida	Los Tigres del Norte
May 5, 2000	Premio Lo Nuestro 2000	James L. Knight Center	Miami, Florida	Antonio Aguilar
February 8, 2001	Premio Lo Nuestro 2001	James L. Knight Center	Miami, Florida	Joan Sebastian
February 7, 2002	Premio Lo Nuestro 2002	James L. Knight Center	Miami, Florida	José José
February 6, 2003	Premio Lo Nuestro 2003	James L. Knight Center	Miami, Florida	Luis Miguel
February 26, 2004	Premio Lo Nuestro 2004	Miami Arena	Miami, Florida	Ricky Martin
February 24, 2005	Premio Lo Nuestro 2005	American Airlines Arena	Miami, Florida	Los Temerarios
February 23, 2006	Premio Lo Nuestro 2006	American Airlines Arena	Miami, Florida	Ana Gabriel
February 22, 2007	Premio Lo Nuestro 2007	American Airlines Arena	Miami, Florida	Juan Luis Guerra
February 21, 2008	Premio Lo Nuestro 2008	American Airlines Arena	Miami, Florida	Vicente Fernández
March 26, 2009	Premio Lo Nuestro 2009	BankUnited Center	Coral Gables, Florida	Emmanuel
February 18, 2010	Premio Lo Nuestro 2010	American Airlines Arena	Miami, Florida	Chayanne
February 17, 2011	Premio Lo Nuestro 2011	American Airlines Arena	Miami, Florida	Maná
February 16, 2012	Premio Lo Nuestro 2012	American Airlines Arena	Miami, Florida	Pepe Aguilar
February 21, 2013	Premio Lo Nuestro 2013	American Airlines Arena	Miami, Florida	Alejandro Sanz
February 20, 2014	Premio Lo Nuestro 2014	American Airlines Arena	Miami, Florida	Marc Anthony
February 19, 2015	Premio Lo Nuestro 2015	American Airlines Arena	Miami, Florida	Ricardo Arjona
February 18, 2016	Premio Lo Nuestro 2016	American Airlines Arena	Miami, Florida	Carlos Vives
February 23, 2017	Premio Lo Nuestro 2017	American Airlines Arena	Miami, Florida	Romeo Santos
February 22, 2018^{A}	Premio Lo Nuestro 2018	American Airlines Arena	Miami, Florida	Gloria Estefan, Emilio Estefan
February 21, 2019	Premio Lo Nuestro 2019	American Airlines Arena	Miami, Florida	Daddy Yankee, Intocable
February 20, 2020	Premio Lo Nuestro 2020	American Airlines Arena	Miami, Florida	Pitbull, Thalía, Alejandra Espinoza
February 18, 2021	Premio Lo Nuestro 2021	American Airlines Arena	Miami, Florida	Gloria Trevi
February 24, 2022	Premio Lo Nuestro 2022	American Airlines Arena	Miami, Florida	Paulina Rubio
February 23, 2023	Premio Lo Nuestro 2023	American Airlines Arena	Miami, Florida	Alejandra Espinoza, Paulina Rubio, Adrián Uribe
February 22, 2024	Premio Lo Nuestro 2024	American Airlines Arena	Miami, Florida	Galilea Montijo, Clarissa Moline, Angélica Vale
February 20, 2025	Premio Lo Nuestro 2025	American Airlines Arena	Miami, Florida	Alejandra Espinoza, Laura Pausini, Thalía

== Premio Lo Nuestro a la Excelencia ==
In addition to categories for different genres of music, the honors include "Premio Lo Nuestro a la Excelencia", (literally, The "Ours" award for Excellence), a career or lifetime achievement award.

== Records ==
=== Most wins ===
As of the 2026 edition, the record for most Premios Lo Nuestro won is held by Shakira with 40 awards. The record for most Premios Lo Nuestro won by a male artist belongs to Bad Bunny and Marc Anthony, with 30 awards. The record for most wins for a group belongs to Intocable, who have collected 25 awards.

Rank	Artist	Number of awards
1	Shakira	40
2	Olga Tañón	31
3	Bad Bunny	30
3	Karol G	30
3	Marc Anthony	30
4	Enrique Iglesias	25
4	Intocable	25
5	Aventura	23
5	Daddy Yankee	23
6	Prince Royce	21
7	Maná	20
7	Romeo Santos	20
8	J Balvin	19
9	Jenni Rivera	18
10	Juanes	16

=== Most wins in a single ceremony ===
The record for the most Premios Lo Nuestro won in a single year is held by Ozuna (in 2019) and Karol G (in 2024), with 9 awards won. Daddy Yankee (in 2020) and Bad Bunny (in 2021) follow with 7 awards won.

- Ozuna: 9 (2019)
- Karol G: 9 (2024)
- Daddy Yankee: 7 (2020)
- Bad Bunny: 7 (2021)

=== Most wins for a male soloist ===
Rank	Artist	Number of awards
1	Bad Bunny	30
1	Marc Anthony	30
2	Enrique Iglesias	25
3	Daddy Yankee	23
4	Prince Royce	21
5	Romeo Santos	20
6	J Balvin	19
7	Juanes	16
8	Carín León	15
8	Maluma	15
8	Vicente Fernández	15
9	Elvis Crespo	14
9	Juan Luis Guerra	14
9	Marco Antonio Solís	14
9	Pepe Aguilar	14
9	Ricky Martin	14
10	Camilo	13

=== Most wins for a female soloist ===
Rank	Artist	Number of awards
1	Shakira	40
2	Olga Tañón	31
3	Karol G	30
4	Jenni Rivera	18
5	Ana Gabriel	13
6	Selena	9
6	Thalía	9
7	Natti Natasha	8
8	Celia Cruz	7
9	Paulina Rubio	6
10	Ana Bárbara	5
10	Becky G	5

=== Most wins by a duo or group ===
Rank	Artist	Number of awards
1	Intocable	25
2	Aventura	23
3	Maná	20
4	Wisin & Yandel	15
5	Grupo Firme	14

== See also ==
- List of Latin music genres

== Notes ==
A. For the 2018 Lo Nuestro Awards, Univision commemorated the 30th anniversary of the awards by only presenting special awards. No nominations were presented that year.
