= Viaje al Centro de la Tierra =

Studio album by Diego Gutiérrez
- Released: 2021
- Studio: PM Records
- Genre: Pop-rock, folk, Nueva Trova, Latin pop
- Label: Egrem Cuba
- Producer: Emilio Martiní and Diego Gutiérrez

Diego Gutiérrez chronology
Piloto automático (2019)	Viaje al Centro de la Tierra (2021)	Primeros auxilios (2025)

Singles from Viaje al Centro de la Tierra
- 1. "Carta de Penélope a Odiseo" Released: 2022; 2. "Sin final Feliz" Released: 2022; 3. "Cincuenta por ciento" Released: 2022

Viaje al Centro de la Tierra is the fourth studio album by Diego Gutiérrez. The songs in it are texts put into music by Diego Gutiérrez written by well-known poets from central Cuba. This work is characterized by the variety of the musical genres that distinguishes the production of this singer-songwriter, and its sonorities of pop-rock, Latin pop, folk, and Cuban music stand out through the album.

== Production ==
For the recording of this album, Diego Gutiérrez turned to guitarist Emilio Martiní for the second time for arrangements and shared record production. It was recorded at PM Records Studios in Havana, and featured important Cuban and foreign instrumentalists.

The songs that compose it are poems by renowned Cuban writers, turned into songs over the years, in friendship shared in the time when Gutiérrez lived in Santa Clara, a province in central Cuba. Hence the title of the album, which is also a tribute to the work of Jules Verne.

This album was officially presented in Cuba in concert at Casa de las Américas in January 2022.

== Track listing ==
No.	Title	Writer(s)	Length
1.	"...tres...cuatro"	Diego Gutiérrez	0:32
2.	"Son de la nada"	Diego Gutiérrez – Samuel Feijóo	4:27
3.	"Memorias"	Diego Gutiérrez – Alexis Castañeda	3:09
4.	"Casi alondra"	Diego Gutiérrez – Yamil Díaz	3:35
5.	"Sin final feliz"	Diego Gutiérrez – Alpidio Alonso	3:57
6.	"A many splendored thing"	Diego Gutiérrez – Sigfredo Ariel	3:39
7.	"Carta de Penélope a Odiseo"	Diego Gutiérrez – Edelmis Anoceto	4:06
8.	"Definición del cariño"	Diego Gutiérrez – Arístides Vega	3:41
9.	"Circo"	Diego Gutiérrez – Carlos Galindo	4:12
10.	"Pasa flotando en las aguas la casa de la muerte"	Diego Gutiérrez – Frank Abel Dopico	5:02
11.	"El maniquí"	Diego Gutiérrez – Pedro Llanes	3:57
12.	"Cincuenta por ciento"	Diego Gutiérrez – Ricardo Riverón	6:39

== Personnel ==
Music and voice in all songs: Diego Gutiérrez

Record producers: Emilio Martiní and Diego Gutiérrez

Arrangements: Emilio Martiní

Electric guitar and acoustic guitar: Emilio Martiní

Programming, Rhodes Piano, keyboards and melodica: Emilio Martiní

Acoustic guitar tracks 6, 10, 11: Diego Gutierrez

Electric bass and double bass: Lázaro ́ ́El Fino ́ ́ Rivero

Drums, percussion set, congas, darbuka, bongo, maracas, güiro, miscellaneous: Yosvany ́ ́El Pipi ́ ́ Betancourt

Tenor sax and alto sax tracks 1 and 7: Mariet Melgarejo

Vocals and backing vocals: Merlin Lorenzo

Backing vocals: Emilio Martiní and Diego Gutiérrez

Andy Williams sample "Love is a many splendored thing" on track 5

Special guests:

Ernán López-Nussa: Acoustic piano on "Circo"

Yaroldy Abreu: shaker, botija, pumpkin, bass drum, claves and miscellaneous

Sergio Bienzobas (Spain): Baritone sax, alto sax and soprano saxophone in "A many splendored thing" and "Definición del cariño". Accordion on "Casi Alondra"

Pablo Cruz Placer: Soprano saxophone in "Carta de Penélope a Odiseo"

Rosa García: Acoustic piano on "Cincuenta por ciento"

Mayquel Gonzälez: Trumpet on "Son de la nada" and "Memorias"

Yissy García: Drums on "Carta de Penélope a Odysseus" and "Definición del cariño"

Ruly Herrera: Drums on "Memorias" and "A Many splendored thing"

Executive Producer: Ingrid Elisabeth Gilart

Recording: Eng. Merlin Lorenzo

Mixing: Merlin Lorenzo and Emilio Martiní

Mastering: Eng. Orestes Águila

Design: Juan Carlos Viera
