= Piloto automático =

Studio album by Diego Gutiérrez
- Released: 2019
- Studio: Abdala Studios
- Genre: Pop-rock, folk, Nueva Trova, Latin pop
- Label: Egrem, Cuba
- Producer: Emilio Martiní and Diego Gutiérrez

Diego Gutiérrez chronology
Palante el Mambo! (2018)	Piloto automático (2019)	Viaje al Centro de la Tierra (2021)

Singles from Piloto automático
- 1. "Como antes" Released: 2021

Piloto automático is the third studio album by Cuban singer-songwriter Diego Gutiérrez. Like Gutiérrez's previous works, it shows great variety and generic versatility, ranging from pop-rock to Latin American music, with a mixture and fusion of Cuban music, Trova and folk music.

== Production ==
This album was recorded at Abdala Studios (Havana, Cuba), with a record production based on the arrangements of Emilio Martiní and a variable format of musicians, chosen according to the generic variety of the album. Piloto automático represented a return to reflexive and nostalgic songs, although there are some with a more optimistic air and spirit.

== Track listing ==
All tracks are written by Diego Gutiérrez.

No.	Title	Length
1.	"Sólo viví"
2.	"La casa se vuelve contra mí"
3.	"Las leyes del Tarot"
4.	"Quien provoca una pena"
5.	"Piloto automático"
6.	"Algo hice mal"
7.	"Sin palabras"
8.	"Migas de pan"
9.	"Todas las noches de un año"
10.	"Como antes"

== Personnel ==
- Vocals, acoustic guitar and backing vocals: Diego Gutiérrez
- Electric guitar, acoustic guitar and backing vocals: Emilio Martiní
- Keyboards and programming: Emilio Martiní
- Electric bass track 1: Jan Cruz
- Double bass on track 6: Gastón Joya
- Electric bass and double bass on the other tracks: David Faya
- Drums: Otto Santana
- Acoustic piano on tracks 4, 5 and 6: Miguel Ángel de Armas
- Minor percussion and miscellaneous: Yosvany Betancourt
- Saxophone on track 6: Jamil Scherry
- Violin on track 8: Jelien Baso
- Quena on track 5: Rodrigo Sosa
- Backing vocals on tracks 1, 2, 4 and 5: Merlin Lorenzo, Rubiel Martin and Elisabeth Padrón
- Second vocals on tracks 1, 3, 5, 7 and 9
- Guest artist in La casa se vuelve contra mí: David Torrens
- Samples on track 3: ̈The Beatles ́ ́Lucy in the sky with diamonds ̈ ̈
- Record producer: Emilio Martiní and Diego Gutiérrez
- Executive Producer: Brenda Besada
- Recording: Eng. Daelsis Pena
- Post-Production: Eng. Merlin Lorenzo
- Mixing: Eng. Jose Raúl Varona
- Mastering: Eng. Orestes Águila
- Photos: Alejandro Azcuy
- Album art: Juan Carlos Viera
