= Fina de Calderón =

Spanish writer, poet and musician (1927–2010)

Fina de Calderón (August 21, 1927 Madrid- January 12, 2010 Madrid) was a Spanish writer, poet, songwriter, and musician.

Her song "Caracola" ("Conch") was the Spanish entry in the Eurovision Song Contest 1964, performed by Los TNT.

== Life ==
She grew up in France. As a youth, she studied violin and composed her first poems. She moved to Toledo, and was owner of Cigarral del Ángel.

== Family ==
She married Fernando Calderon Gutierrez, Marquis of Mozobamba del Pozo, and they had three children, José Rafael, Mariola and Giovanna.

== Works ==
- Fuego, grito, luna (Fire, cry, moon), (theater)
- Los pasos que no regresan. Huerga Y Fierro Editores. 2004. ISBN 978-84-8374-473-4. (The steps do not come back) (Memoir)

=== Poetry ===
- La cicatriz de arena (The scar of sand) (poetry)
- Pluriels (Plurales) Fugger Libros, SIAL Ediciones, 2006, ISBN 978-84-96464-18-6 (poems bilingual French / Spanish)
- Canciones infantiles. Illustrator Alain Durand. Ediciones de la Torre. 2007. ISBN 978-84-7960-382-3.
- La sed que dura. Huerga Y Fierro Editores. 2002. ISBN 978-84-8374-365-2.
- Glorieta de la melancolía. Huerga Y Fierro Editores. 1998. ISBN 978-84-8374-040-8.
- Vencejos, aunque ruiseñores. Ediciones de la Torre. 1994. ISBN 978-84-7960-072-3.

=== Songs ===
- "En Roma (Rome)"
- "La otra mitad (The other half)"
- "Pouvoir" (song by Édith Piaf)
- "Nous de Paris" (song by Maurice Chevalier)
- "Caracola (Conch)"
- "Primer plano (Foreground)" (song by Víctor Manuel in 1966)
- Mis Canciones Festivaleras de los años 60. Ediciones de la Torre. 2007. ISBN 978-84-7960-383-0. (My festival-goers songs of the 60's)"

=== Dances ===
- Cancela (ballet)
- El Greco (ballet)
