= Papo Román =

Puerto Rican musician (born 1957)

- Also known as: Papo
- Born: Víctor Román; December 12, 1957 (age 67)
- Origin: Dorado, Puerto Rico
- Genres: Rock en Español; Nueva trova Salsa
- Occupation: Musician
- Instrument: percussion
- Years active: 1970-present
- Formerly of: Fiel a La Vega
- Website: www.fielalavega.com

Víctor "Papo" Román (born December 12, 1957, in Dorado, Puerto Rico) is a Puerto Rican musician most known for being the percussionist of the Rock en Español band Fiel a la Vega.

== Biography and career ==
Papo Román is the son of Víctor Román and Juanita Rodríguez. Since he was 12 years old, he started developing an interest in music. His first teacher was his friend Miguel Nieto. After years of practicing and with the influences of Richie Ray & Bobby Cruz, Román started playing with several groups like Orquesta La Preferida, La Sónica, Maso Rivera, Tavín Pumarejo, and Orquesta La Innovacián, among others.

In 1996, when Fiel a la Vega was completing the recording of their first album, guitarist Ricky Laureano (who was Román's brother-in-law at the time) invited Román to play percussion in the song "El Wanabí". After that, they invited Román to play the songs "El Wanabí" and "Las Flores de Emilio" in their first concert. The latter was the first song of the set and after five songs, the band noticed that Román was still playing with them. The band liked it so much that they decided to include Román in the band.

The band's first album quickly achieved great success in the island releasing several radio hits and winning several awards. As of 2007, the band released four studio albums with Román.

On October 11, 2006, Román communicated with a letter to the fans and the press that he will be quitting the band after ten years. He stated that, despite not regretting the time spent with the band, he needed to slow down and dedicate time to his family. Román is the father of six children, two of them teenage daughters.

== See also ==
- Music in Puerto Rico
- Puerto Rican rock
