= Moliendo Vidrio =

- Origin: Puerto Rico
- Genres: Nueva trova
- Years active: 1975–present
- Past members: Gary Núñez; Sunshine Logroño; Rosita Velázquez; Iván Martínez; Pedro Villalón

Moliendo Vidrio (originally called Moliendo Vidrio con el Pecho) is a Nueva Trova band from Puerto Rico, founded in 1975.

Band members included Gary Núñez, Sunshine Logroño, Rosita Velázquez, Iván Martínez, Pedro Villalón and Carmen Nydia Velázquez, among many others. Moliendo Vidrio's repertoire has been sung by generations and it has become part of the Puerto Rican folklore.

== Band history ==
=== Un Junte para la Historia ===
In November 1998, the band reunited for a concert with Puerto Rican bands Fiel a la Vega and Haciendo Punto en Otro Son. During the concert, the bands alternated sets performing the hit songs of each other, ending with a huge "junte" of all of the musicians singing several songs of each band. The concert was recorded and released later as an album titled Un Junte para la Historia.
