= Fiel a La Vega =

Rock en Español band from Puerto Rico

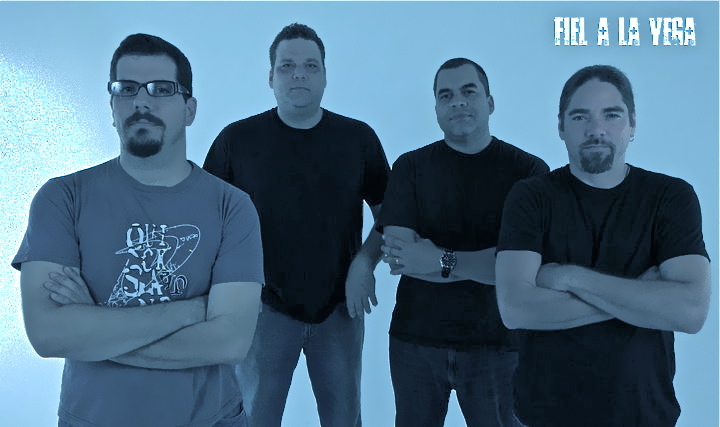
- Fiel a La Vega - Pedro Arraiza, Jorge Arraiza, Ricky Laureano, Tito Auger

Background information
- Origin: Vega Baja and Vega Alta, Puerto Rico
- Genres: Rock en Español
- Years active: 1994–present
- Members: Tito Auger; Ricky Laureano; Jorge Arraiza; Pedro Arraiza
- Past members: Papo Román

Fiel a La Vega is a Rock en español band from Puerto Rico formed in 1994. The band consisted of members Tito Auger and Ricky Laureano (vocals and guitars), who come from the northern city of Vega Alta, Puerto Rico, along with brothers Pedro and Jorge Arraiza (drums and bass), who come from the neighboring city of Vega Baja. Their hometown is what gave name to the band. Since 1996, they were joined by percussionist Papo Román, who left the band in 2006 to spend time with his family.

The band rose to prominence with their eponymous debut album, which was released in 1996. The album was a hit, spawning several hit singles like "Salimos de Aquí" and "El Wanabí", and turning the band into one of the most popular musical groups in the island at the moment. Fiel a la Vega followed their debut album with four more studio albums, three of which were released independently. Despite not having the support of a multinational record label or wide publicity, after 20 years, the band is still considered by many as "the most important rock band in the history of Puerto Rico".

In recent years, the band has left the hectic production/gigging schedule, with its members being involved in personal projects. Singer Auger has been touring the island solo, and with a musical troupe called La Banda Acústica Rodante, while guitarist Laureano has been pursuing a solo career, while also touring the island with fellow guitarist Joel Rodríguez. Brothers Pedro and Jorge continue to work as a professor and chef respectively, while also working on their own band, Los Arraiza Voladores and featuring with the acoustic cover band Good Acoustics. In October 2016 the band performed at the Coliseo of Puerto Rico to celebrate their 20th anniversary accompanied by former member Papo Román and keyboards played by Francisco "Quito" González. The concert had an attendance of 7,000 people and lasted 3 and a half hours commemorating their two decades playing music.

== Band history ==
=== Early years (1994-1995) ===
Childhood friends Ricky Laureano and Tito Auger formed the band in 1994 after looking for success in the United States. Returning to Puerto Rico, they joined long-time friends Pedro and Jorge Arraiza (with whom they had played before in Los Arraiza Voladores) and officially started the band. After playing local gigs through the island, they started gaining the attention of the public and became one of the most sought bands in the island. Their television debut was in Voces en Función.

=== First Albums and Success (1996-1998) ===
In April 1996, the band released their eponymous album Fiel a la Vega, adding percussionist Papo Román to its line-up. The album spawned hits like "Salimos de Aquí" and "El Wanabí", both of which were released with videos. According to local newspaper El Nuevo Día, the album was among the Top 10 sellers of the year. In August 1996, the band played at Hard Rock Cafe in Old San Juan. In 1997, their first album was certified gold for selling 50,000 units.

Following the success of the album, the band held four sold-out concerts in July 1997 in the Performing Arts Center of Guaynabo. The concert was released months later as the band's follow-up album, titled El Concierto Acústico. In the concert, the band played acoustic versions of the songs in their first album as well as covers from Latin American artists that influenced them such as Roy Brown, Leon Gieco, Silvio Rodríguez, and Haciendo Punto en Otro Son.

The band continued to enjoy the success playing in front of 30,000 people at the Claridad Festival. That night an attendance record at the festival was set. That same year, they participated in the annual special show of Banco Popular dedicated to Bobby Capó. The band performed the song "Sale el Sol" in the show.

In 1998, amidst relentless touring, they released A Quien Pueda Interesar. The album was accompanied with videos for the songs "Bla, Bla, Bla", "Al Frente", and "El Panal". Following the success of this second album, they became the first Puerto Rican band to headline and sell out the Roberto Clemente Coliseum. The concert was held on June 6, 1998.

In November of the same year, they returned to the Roberto Clemente Coliseum, sharing the stage with local bands Haciendo Punto en Otro Son and Moliendo Vidrio. During the concert, the bands alternated sets performing the hit songs of each other, ending with a huge "junte" of all of the musicians singing several songs of each band. The concert was recorded and released later as an album titled Un Junte para la Historia.

=== Deal with EMI Latin (1999-2001) ===
In March 1999, the band organized a series of concerts at the Luis A. Ferré Performing Arts Center where they performed their music with a symphonic orchestra, not The Puerto Rico Symphonic Orchestra, as it is sometimes stated. In the concert, they played their hits as well as covers from Rubén Blades, Danny Rivera, Silvio Rodríguez, and Puerto Rican Salsa superstars El Gran Combo. At that time, the band finished negotiating a record deal with EMI Latin. Soon after, they released Tres being their only CD with a major label. The band produced the hit singles "Canción en la Arena", "Solamente" and "Desde el Comienzo".

In April 2000, the band toured the East Coast of the United States with shows in Miami, Orlando, New York City, and Washington, DC. In June 2000, upon returning to Puerto Rico, the band held a concert at the Rubén Rodríguez Coliseum in Bayamón. In August 2001, they collaborated with other artists in a song titled "Canción para Vieques", about the Navy-Vieques protests.

=== Last albums (2001-2010) ===
In November 2001, they parted ways with EMI Latin. A month later, they released their second live album titled El Concierto Sinfónico. They followed it with presentations in the island and in Florida, while they began to work in their fourth studio album. The album La Prosperidad was released independently in December 2002 with the single "Hay que Edificar". They supported it with a national tour through all the island finishing on May 31, 2002, with a concert at the Roberto Clemente Coliseum.

In 2005, they released a greatest hits album to coincide with the band's tenth anniversary. Desde el Comienzo: 1994-2004.

On October 11, 2006, percussionist Papo Román communicated by letter to his " friends, press, musicians and dear fieles" that he will be quitting the band after ten long years with them. He stated that, despite not regretting the time spent with the band, he needed to slow down and dedicate time to his family. Román is the father of six children, two of them teenage daughters.

In 2007, the band was selected along with several Latin rock groups to be part of a marketing campaign from Absolut Vodka. The campaign features the popular Absolut bottle silhouette using the motif of Fiel a la Vega's first album. The other bands selected were Los Amigos Invisibles (Venezuela), Charly García (Argentina), Los Jaivas (Chile) and Aterciopelados (Colombia).

In March 2007, the band recorded a live concert at the Ambassador Theater in San Juan. At the end of the year, the concert was released in a DVD titled Sesiones: 10 Años Acústicos y Eléctricos. Also, according to their website, they started working on a new album.

In April 2008, the band played at the Movistar Music Fest 2008 in Panama, with Tego Calderón, Calle 13, and Zion.

In early 2010, the band released the first single from their next album. The album, titled Equilibrio, was released on February 9, 2010. On December of that year, the band started a series of concerts on the cities of San Juan, Ponce, and Mayaguez. The concert in San Juan was supposed to be held at the University of Puerto Rico at Río Piedras, but due to ongoing strikes and protests at the university against the government, the band moved it to the Centro de Bellas Artes in Caguas. During the concert, lead singer Tito Auger heavily criticized the government for its handling of the crisis at the university and the current state of the country. "In recent years, it has been made more evident that the alleged democracy that protects us is only a mask for the media, a simple slogan. We are dominated by a plutocracy, which is an industrial, business, and political class, that is getting stronger and richer" said Auger.

=== Recent years ===
In recent years, the members have all been involved in their own projects. Singer Tito Auger has been performing with La Banda Acústica Rodante, which features fellow singers and musicians Mikie Rivera, Rucco Gandía, Walter Morciglio, and Nore Feliciano, while guitarist Ricky Laureano has launched a solo career, releasing two albums and occasionally touring under the name of Laureano & Rodríguez, along with Joel Rodríguez. Laureano explained in an interview that "saying we [Fiel a la Vega] will continue to make music together is more complicated than ever because everybody is doing his own thing. Tito and I are dedicated full-time to music, Jorge is a chef, and Pedro is a professor; so it wouldn't be impossible, but it's an uphill battle."

On October 18, 2014, Fiel a la Vega held a sold-out concert at Bahía Urbana in San Juan, Puerto Rico, in front of nearly 5,500 people. During the concert, which lasted more than 3 hours, the band played songs that spanned their 18-year trajectory. The concert was also broadcast through the Internet.

In October 2016 the band performed on the Coliseo of Puerto Rico to celebrate their 20th anniversary accompanied by former member Papo Román and keyboards played by Francisco "Quito" González. The concert had an attendance of 7,000 people and lasted three and a half hours commemorating their two decades playing music.

On August 18, 2018, they sold out hotspot venue VIVO Beach Club with a show including hits from all their albums. The show featured giant projection screens on which videos allusive to the songs were shown.

In October 2019 they sold out two shows at San Juan"s Luis A. Ferre Performing Arts Center of their acoustic show accompanied by a string quartet directed by Ricardo "Papoi" Dávila and with pianist Jorge "Bebo' Rivera.

They followed up in November 2nd with "Rocktoberfest @ VIVO Beach Club" alongside Puerto Rican rock bands Vivanativa, La Secta and Millo Torres y el Tercer Planeta. hosted by comedian Chente Ydrach. For this show Ocean Lab Brewery (located at VIVO Beach Club) produced one distinct beer for each of the bands and the host, to their specifications and those were the only beers available during the Fest.

On July 27, 2020, they broadcast a live, socially distanced show over social media platforms which collected nearly half a million views in two days. In this show they played their 1998 album "A Quien Pueda Interesar" entirely. They also announced new material in the works.

In August 2023, the band released Prima•Vera, their sixth studio album and the first in more than 13 years. Guitarist Ricky Laureano said the new album represented "a musical rebirth for us and a testimony of our commitment to music".

== Band members ==
=== Current members ===
- Tito Auger - Vocals, rhythm guitars
- Ricky Laureano - Vocals, lead guitars
- Jorge Arraiza - bass guitar, keyboards, background vocals
- Pedro Arraiza - drums, background vocals

=== Former members ===
- Papo Román - percussion (1996–2006)

== Discography ==
=== Studio albums ===
- Fiel a la Vega (April 1996)
- A Quien Pueda Interesar (May 1, 1998)
- Tres (November 1999)
- La Prosperidad (December 2002)
- Equilibrio (February 2010)
- Prima•Vera (August 2023)

=== Live albums ===
- El Concierto Acústico (November 1997)
- El Concierto Sinfónico (December 2001)
- Sesiones: 10 Años Acústicos y Eléctricos (DVD, December 2007)
- El Concierto (CD/DVD, October 2015)
- En Vivo Desde El Teatro Ambassador (Marzo 2019)

=== Compilations ===
- Desde el Comienzo: 1994-2004 (2005)

=== Other collaborations ===
- Siempre Piel Canela: La Música de Bobby Capó (1997, released by Banco Popular)
- Un Junte para la Historia (November 1998)

=== Singles ===
Year	Song	Album
1996	"Salimos de Aquí"	Fiel a la Vega
1996	"El Wanabí"	Fiel a la Vega
1998	"Bla, Bla, Bla"	A Quien Pueda Interesar
1998	"Al Frente"	A Quien Pueda Interesar
1998	"El Panal"	A Quien Pueda Interesar
1999	"Canción en la Arena"	Tres
2000	"Solamente"	Tres
2000	"Desde el Comienzo"	Tres
2002	"Hay Que Edificar"	La Prosperidad
2003	"A Quien Pueda Interesar"	La Prosperidad
2003	"Maniqueismo"	La Prosperidad
2010	"Turísticamente Bien"	Equilibrio

== Awards ==
=== 1997 ===
- Farándula Award: Best Local Rock Band.
- Artistas Award: Most Outstanding Band of the Year.
- Tu Música Award: Best National Rock Band.
- Tu Música Award: Ballad/Pop Song of the Year ("El Wanabí")

=== 1998 ===
- Tu Música Award: Best National Rock Band.
- Tu Música Award: Song of the Year ("Boricua en la Luna")
- Tu Música People's Choice Award.

=== 2000 ===
- Tu Música Award: Best National Video ("Solamente")

=== 2001 ===
- ASCAP Award: Best Rock en Español Song ("Canción en la Arena" written by Auger and Laureano)

== Book ==
In 2005, writer Edgardo Soto released a biography of the band titled Salimos de Aquí: La Biografía de Fiel a la Vega. The book includes facts about the band's formation and their rise to fame in the mid-1990s.

=== Release Information ===
- Soto, Edgardo. (2005) Salimos de Aquí: La Biografía de Fiel a la Vega. Terranova Editores; 1st Edition (ISBN 0976015897)

== See also ==
- Music in Puerto Rico
- Puerto Rican rock
- List of Puerto Rican songwriters
