= Bruno Villareal =

American accordionist (1901–1971)

- Also known as: El Azote del Valle
- Born: October 6, 1901; La Grulla, Texas, US
- Origin: San Benito, Texas, US
- Died: November 3, 1971 (aged 70) Robstown, Texas, US
- Genres: Conjunto
- Occupation: Accordionist
- Instruments: Diatonic button accordion, piano accordion

Bruno "El Azote del Valle" Villareal (October 6, 1901 – November 3, 1971) was an American Conjunto accordionist.

== Biography ==
Villareal was born on October 6, 1901, in La Grulla, Texas, later settling in San Benito. He recorded his first song on phonograph in 1928. He signed to Okeh Records, and was recorded on June 12, 1930, being the first accordionist to be signed by a major label. During the 1930s, he lived in a shack three miles Santa Rosa. Despite being half-blind, he would walk there every day to play for money. He fell from the public eye after World War II. He died on November 3, 1971, aged 70, in Robstown.

== Artistry ==
Considered a master accordionist, Villareal's accordion was often backed by other instruments, such as the twelve-string bass and tambora. His style was considered traditional.
