= La Grulla, Texas =

- City
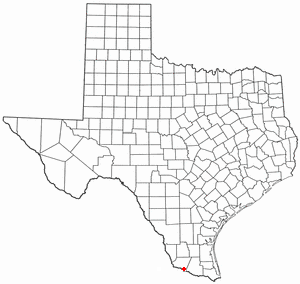
- Location of La Grulla, Texas

- Coordinates: 26°16′9″N 98°38′49″W
- Country: United States
- State: Texas
- County: Starr

Area
  - Total: 0.94 sq mi (2.43 km^{2})
  - Land: 0.94 sq mi (2.43 km^{2})
  - Water: 0 sq mi (0.00 km^{2})
- Elevation: 141 ft (43 m)

Population (2020)
  - Total: 1,222
  - Density: 1,300/sq mi (503/km^{2})
- Time zone: UTC-6 (Central (CST))
  - Summer (DST): UTC-5 (CDT)
- Zip Code: 78548, 78582
- FIPS code: 48-40288
- GNIS feature ID: 1339324
- Website: https://cityoflagrulla.com/

La Grulla is a city in Starr County, Texas, United States, founded by Juan Santiago Longoria (3rd great-grandfather of actress Eva Longoria) in 1836. The population was 1,222 at the 2020 census.

== Geography ==
La Grulla is located at 26°16′9″N 98°38′49″W (26.269278, –98.647067).

The city gained area prior to the 2010 census giving it a total area of 0.9 square mile (2.0 km^{2}), all land.

== Demographics ==
Historical population
Census	Pop.	Note	%±
1970	1,194		—
1980	1,442		20.8%
1990	1,335		−7.4%
2000	1,211		−9.3%
2010	1,622		33.9%
2020	1,222		−24.7%
U.S. Decennial Census; 1850–1900 1910; 1920 1930 1940; 1950 1960 1970; 1980 1990 2000; 2010 2020

La Grulla first appeared as a city in the 1970 U.S. census.

=== Racial and ethnic composition ===
La Grulla city, Texas – Racial and ethnic composition Note: the US Census treats Hispanic/Latino as an ethnic category. This table excludes Latinos from the racial categories and assigns them to a separate category. Hispanics/Latinos may be of any race.
Race / Ethnicity (NH = Non-Hispanic)	Pop 2000	Pop 2010	Pop 2020	% 2000	% 2010	% 2020
White alone (NH)	26	29	26	2.15%	1.79%	2.13%
Black or African American alone (NH)	2	0	2	0.17%	0.00%	0.16%
Native American or Alaska Native alone (NH)	1	1	0	0.08%	0.06%	0.00%
Asian alone (NH)	0	0	0	0.00%	0.00%	0.00%
Native Hawaiian or Pacific Islander alone (NH)	0	0	0	0.00%	0.00%	0.00%
Other race alone (NH)	0	0	0	0.00%	0.00%	0.00%
Mixed race or Multiracial (NH)	0	1	4	0.00%	0.06%	0.33%
Hispanic or Latino (any race)	1,182	1,591	1,190	97.61%	98.09%	97.38%
Total	1,211	1,622	1,222	100.00%	100.00%	100.00%

=== 2020 census ===
As of the 2020 census, La Grulla had a population of 1,222 and 327 families. The median age was 41.0 years; 23.6% of residents were under the age of 18 and 20.7% were 65 years of age or older. For every 100 females there were 96.1 males, and for every 100 females age 18 and over there were 92.0 males age 18 and over.

There were 432 households in La Grulla, of which 36.1% had children under the age of 18 living in them. Of all households, 43.3% were married-couple households, 20.4% were households with a male householder and no spouse or partner present, and 33.6% were households with a female householder and no spouse or partner present. About 23.9% of all households were made up of individuals and 15.3% had someone living alone who was 65 years of age or older.

There were 505 housing units, of which 14.5% were vacant. The homeowner vacancy rate was 0.0% and the rental vacancy rate was 0.0%.

As of the 2020 census, 0.0% of residents lived in urban areas while 100.0% lived in rural areas.

Racial composition as of the 2020 census
Race	Number	Percent
White	392	32.1%
Black or African American	3	0.2%
American Indian and Alaska Native	2	0.2%
Asian	0	0.0%
Native Hawaiian and Other Pacific Islander	0	0.0%
Some other race	164	13.4%
Two or more races	661	54.1%
Hispanic or Latino (of any race)	1,190	97.4%

=== 2000 census ===
At the 2000 census there were 1,211 people, 370 households, and 297 families living in the city. The population density was 2,074.2 inhabitants per square mile (800.9/km^{2}). There were 468 housing units at an average density of 801.6 per square mile (309.5/km^{2}). The racial makeup of the city was 75.72% White, 0.17% African American, 0.58% Native American, 22.71% from other races, and 0.83% from two or more races. Hispanic or Latino of any race were 97.61%.

Of the 370 households 40.5% had children under the age of 18 living with them, 54.6% were married couples living together, 19.2% had a female householder with no husband present, and 19.7% were non-families. 17.6% of households were one person and 10.8% were one person aged 65 or older. The average household size was 3.27 and the average family size was 3.70.

The age distribution was 33.9% under the age of 18, 10.7% from 18 to 24, 23.4% from 25 to 44, 18.8% from 45 to 64, and 13.2% 65 or older. The median age was 30 years. For every 100 females, there were 92.8 males. For every 100 females age 18 and over, there were 87.1 males.

The median household income was $16,648 and the median family income was $18,359. Males had a median income of $15,789 versus $15,250 for females. The per capita income for the city was $6,700. About 34.6% of families and 40.0% of the population were below the poverty line, including 49.2% of those under age 18 and 43.6% of those age 65 or over.

== Education ==
La Grulla is served by the Rio Grande City Grulla Independent School District (formerly Rio Grande City CISD).
