= Pedro Arraiza =

Puerto Rican musician

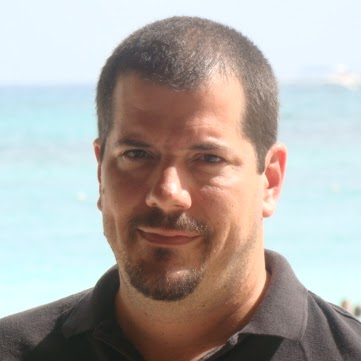

Background information
- Born: May 2, 1973 (age 53)
- Origin: Vega Baja, Puerto Rico
- Genres: Rock en Español; Nueva trova Jazz
- Occupations: Musician, Math tutor
- Instruments: vocals drums
- Years active: 1989-present
- Member of: Fiel a la Vega

Pedro Arraiza (born May 2, 1973 in Santurce, Puerto Rico) is a Puerto Rican musician most known for being the drummer of the Rock en Español band Fiel a la Vega.

== Biography and career ==
Pedro Arraiza is the youngest of the five children of Manuel Arraiza and Eneida González. Since he was 8 years old, he was pressed by his brothers Jorge and José to learn to play the drums in order to fill the vacant spot they had in their band.

Arraiza then developed interest in bands like The Beatles and The Who. In 1989, after some practicing the brothers formed a band called Los Arraiza Voladores, with cousin Emilio "Milo" Arraiza. At this time, he also developed an interest in Led Zeppelin, which would become his biggest influence.

In 1994, when childhood friends Tito Auger and Ricky Laureano returned from the United States, Pedro and his brother Jorge joined them and formed Fiel a la Vega. The band quickly achieved great success in the island releasing several radio hits and winning several awards. As of 2010, the band has released five studio albums.

== Personal life ==
- Arraiza has a Master's degree in Education with a concentration in Teaching of Mathematics from the Interamerican University of Puerto Rico.
- He was a Math high school teacher for 13 years (2001-2014)., took a 5-year break and started teaching again in February 2019.
- He is a Mathematics Assessment Specialist.
- He practiced fencing.

== Influences ==
Aside of the above mentioned The Who, The Beatles, and Led Zeppelin, Pedro mentions drummers Carter Beauford (from Dave Matthews Band), Neil Peart (from Rush), Simon Phillips (from Toto) and Dave Weckl among some of his American influences. He also credits Silvio Rodríguez, Rubén Blades, Haciendo Punto en Otro Son, Ismael Rivera and El Gran Combo among his influences in the tropical and Caribbean music genre.

== Other Collaborations ==
Aside of his work with Fiel a la Vega, Pedro is the drummer of El Asombroso Acto de los Hermanos Arraiza Voladores, and occasionally collaborates with Ricky Laureano and Good Acoustics.

== See also ==
- Music in Puerto Rico
- Puerto Rican rock
