= Tito Mora =

Spanish pop singer

- Born: Carlos García Romero; 25 June 1940; Madrid, Spain
- Died: 30 December 2013 (aged 73); Madrid, Spain
- Other name: Carlos García
- Occupation: Pop singer
- Years active: 1950s–1996

Carlos García Romero (25 June 1940 – 30 December 2013), better known by his stage name Tito Mora, was a Spanish pop singer.

Born in Madrid, he began his career as a member of Los Brujos, one of Spain's first pop music groups, and recorded his final album in 1996.

Tito Mora died from a long pulmonary illness on 30 December 2013, aged 72, at a hospital in Madrid.
