= Pablo Milanés =

Cuban musician (1943–2022)

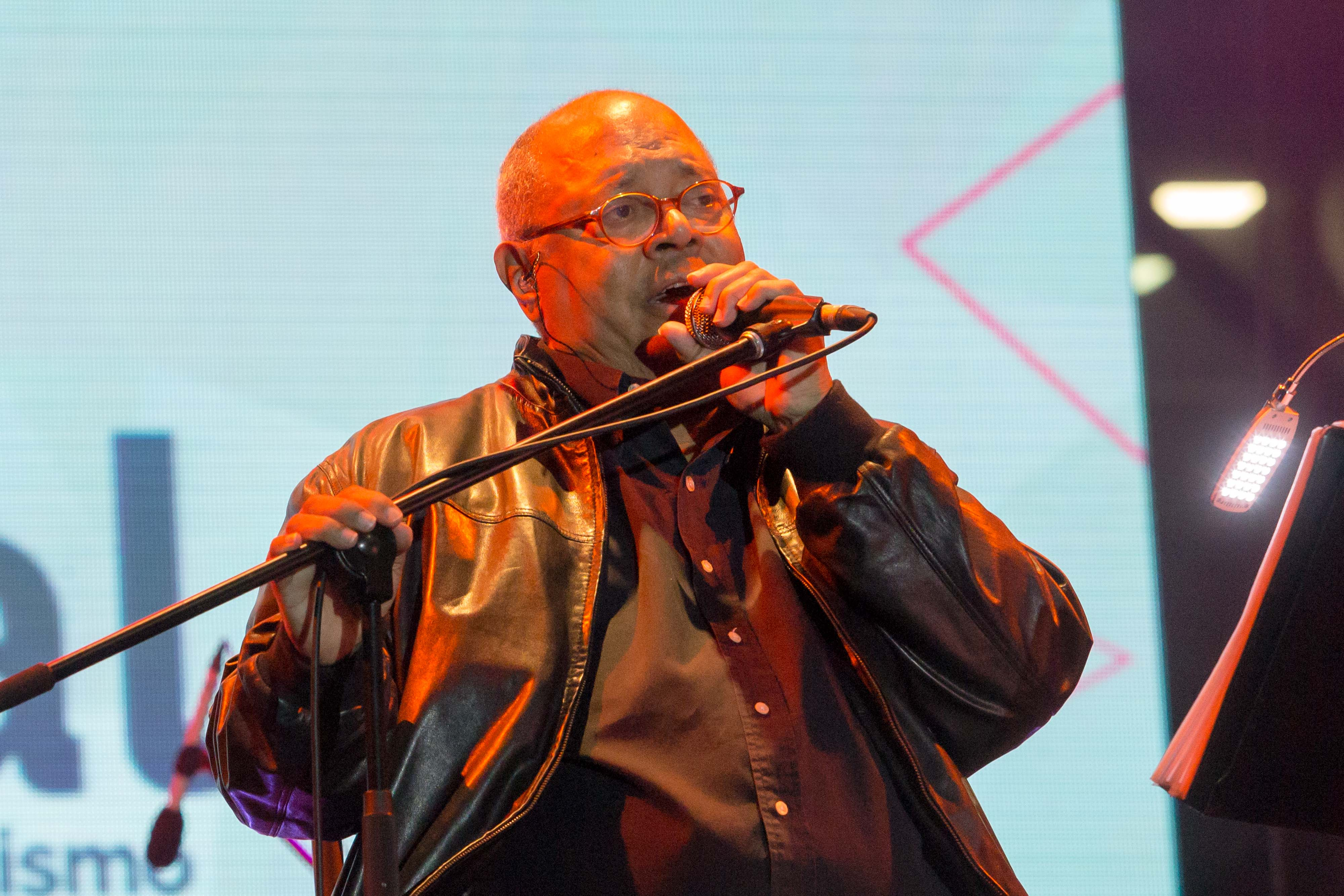
- Milanés in concert in 2015, Medellín, Colombia.

Background information
- Born: Pablo Milanés Arias; 24 February 1943; Bayamo, Oriente, Cuba
- Died: 22 November 2022 (aged 79) Madrid, Spain
- Genres: Filin; nueva trova; son; protest song
- Occupations: Musician; singer; composer
- Instruments: Guitar; vocals; piano
- Years active: 1956–2022
- Formerly of: Silvio Rodríguez; Noel Nicola; Vicente Feliú
- Website: milanespablo.com

Pablo Milanés Arias (24 February 1943 – 22 November 2022) was a Cuban guitarist and singer. He was one of the founders of the Cuban nueva trova, along with Silvio Rodríguez and Noel Nicola. His music, originating in the Trova, Son and other traditional styles of early 20th Century Cuban music, set him apart from the style of Silvio Rodríguez.

== Biography ==
Pablo Milanés, widely known as Pablito, moved with his family from Bayamo to Havana in 1950. He studied in the Conservatorio Municipal de La Habana, at the time the most prestigious musical school in the country. His first public performance was in 1956. By age 15, he was active in "bohemian" musical circles in Havana, associated with the so-called "filin" musicians.

Although he supported the Cuban Revolution, in 1965 he was sent to the UMAP agricultural forced-labor camp in Camagüey. In 1967, he escaped and fled to Havana to denounce the injustice of the labor camp. This resulted in his imprisonment, first for two months in La Cabaña, an 18th-century fortress in Havana, and then for a time in a prison camp. He was released when the prison camp was closed due to international pressure.

In 1969, he became part of the Grupo de Experimentación Sonora, a seminal group of young musicians, many of whom became founding members of the nueva trova, which started as a movement with a concert given by Pablo, Silvio Rodriguez, and Noel Nicola on 18 February 1968. Until the late 1980s, nueva trova was the unofficial musical style of the Cuban Revolution.

Since his first recording ("Versos sencillos de José Martí" in 1973), he issued more than 40 solo records, and many more in collaboration with other artists from Cuba, elsewhere in Latin America, and Spain. His first record with original songs (the eponymous "Pablo Milanés") was not issued until 1976. The heyday of his creativity occurred probably in the early 1980s, with his records "Yo me quedo", "El guerrero", and "Comienzo y final de una verde mañana".

Within the context of the nueva trova, Pablo was widely considered one of the closest to the traditional roots of Cuban music, while being open to diverse musical influences from other contemporary traditions, such as Brazilian music and Blues. The range of his compositions extended from starkly political anthems to inspired love songs. He set the poems of Cuban writers such as José Martí and Nicolás Guillén to music. Some of his most important musical influences were María Teresa Vera, Lorenzo Hierrezuelo, Barbarito Diez, Benny Moré, Lucho Gatica, and Johann Sebastian Bach. He won the Golden Osella for A Very Old Man with Enormous Wings (1988).

He lived in Vigo, Spain, with his Spanish wife and two sons since 2004. In 2014, he received a kidney transplant, receiving an organ donated by his wife.

Since relocating to Spain, Milanés was publicly critical of some aspects of the Cuban government, though he remained dedicated to the Cuban Revolution. In 2011, it was reported that his willingness to speak openly about the failures of the revolution strained his relations with Silvio Rodriguez. At that time, he did not participate in pro-government campaigns.

== Discography ==
- 1974 – Versos José Martí Cantados por Pablo Milanés
- 1975 – Canta a Nicolás Guillén
- 1976 – Pablo Milanés
- 1978 – No me pidas
- 1979 – Aniversario
- 1979 – Años with Luis Peña
- 1980 – Canta a la resistencia popular chilena
- 1981 – El pregón de las flores with Lilia Vera
- 1981 – Filin
- 1982 – Yo me quedo
- 1983 – El guerrero
- 1984 – Comienzo y final de una verde mañana
- 1984 – Ao vivo no Brasil
- 1986 – Querido Pablo
- 1986 – Años 2 with Luis Peña and Octavio Sánchez (Cotán)
- 1987 – Buenos días América
- 1987 – Trovadores with Armando Garzón
- 1988 – Proposiciones
- 1989 – Filin 2
- 1989 – Filin 3
- 1990 – Identidad
- 1991 – Canto de la abuela
- 1991 – Filin 4
- 1991 – Filin 5
- 1992 – Años 3 with Luis Peña (El Albino), Compay Segundo, and Octavio Sánchez (Cotán)
- 1994 – Canta boleros en Tropicana
- 1994 – Evolución
- 1994 – Igual que ayer with Caco Senante
- 1994 – Orígenes
- 1995 – Plegaria
- 1995 – Si yo volviera a nacer
- 1995 – Blanco y negro with Víctor Manuel
- 1997 – Despertar
- 1998 – Vengo naciendo
- 2000 – Días de gloria
- 2000 – Live from New York City
- 2002 – Pablo querido
- 2005 – Como un campo de maíz
- 2005 – Líneas paralelas with Andy Montañez
- 2007 – Regalo
- 2007 – Pablo Milanés en vivo: Amor y desamor
- 2008 – Raúl y Pablo with Raúl Torres
- 2008 – Más allá de todo with Chucho Valdés
- 2008 – Feeling 6
- 2011 – Pablo y Lynn Milanés en concierto with daughter Lynn Milanés
- 2013 – Renacimiento
- 2014 – Canción de otoño
- 2015 – 50 de 22
- 2016 – Flores del futuro with Miguel Núñez
- 2017 – Amor with daughter Haydée Milanés
- 2023 – Amor y salsa with various artists
