= Noel Nicola =

Cuban singer-songwriter

Noel Nicola (October 7, 1946 - August 7, 2005 in Havana, Cuba) was a Cuban singer-songwriter and founder of the Cuban nueva trova, along with Silvio Rodríguez, Pablo Milanés, Vicente Feliú Miranda and Sara Rosa González Gómez. He authored several songs of great significance within the Cuban music.

The first contact Noel Nicola had with music was in bosom of his family, because his father Isaac Nicola Romero was a guitar player and teacher, while his mother Eva Reyes was a violinist in the Orquesta Sinfónica Nacional (Cuba’s National Symphonic Orchestra) and a singer. Between the years 1954 and 1956, he studied under the guidance of Douane Voth (piccolo), and Martín Quiñones (singing lessons).

In the late 1960s and early 1970s, he was a student of Leo Brouwer, Juan Elósegui, Federico Smith and Sergio Vitier, not in the traditional academic way but as part of a workshop that was known as the Grupo de Experimentación Sonora del ICAIC (a Group of Sound Experimentation that worked for the Cuban Institute of Cinematographic Art and Industry).

Nicola died of cancer on August 7, 2005, at the age of 58.
