= Haciendo Punto en Otro Son =

Puerto Rican musical group

- Also known as: Haciendo Punto
- Origin: Puerto Rico
- Genres: Nueva trova
- Years active: 1975–present
- Past members: Original: Josy Latorre, Silverio Perez, Tony Croatto, Irvin Garcia, Nano Cabrera; Later: José Paché Cruz Ivan Gonzalez Aulet Moncho Díaz; José Vallejo; Jorge Arce; Ileana “Nana” Latorre; Nena Rivera; Cuqui Rodríguez; Pedro Guzmán; Rayda Cotto; José Vega; Millito Cruz; José "Chiqui" García
- Website: haciendopunto.com

Haciendo Punto en Otro Son is a Nueva Trova band from Puerto Rico, founded in 1975. They recorded fourteen albums and performed in Latin America, the Caribbean and United States.

Band members included Tony Croatto, Silverio Pérez, Josy LaTorre, Irvin García, Nano Cabrera, Ivan Gonzalez, Jorge Arce, José Vega Santana, Moncho Diaz, Jose ‘Pache’ Cruz and many others. Haciendo Punto’s repertoire has been sung by generations and it has become part of the Puerto Rican folklore.

Haciendo Punto’s contribution was the dissemination of other performers' music from the Caribbean and Latin America as well as their own Puerto Rican culture.

== Band history ==
The original quintet recorded the first two albums. Tony and Nano departed the group to form their own band which focuses on folklore and not "Nueva Trova". The third album was a huge success. Since the fourth album, Silverio Perez was the only member left from the original group.

Bassist and producer Ivan Gonzalez Aulet lead the group from the fourth to the ninth album, "Punto Final" (March, 1986). Tony, Silverio, Josy and Irvin recorded additional albums after the tenth, el Concierto Original (2000).

== First album ==
Haciendo Punto's eponymous album has reached classic status in Puerto Rico. All of its songs (except "Ríe y Bosteza", written by Cuban singer Silvio Rodríguez) either were radio hits or have become cultural references in Puerto Rico. The album features the following:

- "En la vida todo es ir", a poem written by Juan Antonio Corretjer, set to music by Roy Brown. It has since been versioned by various Spanish language interpreters, including Joan Manuel Serrat, Fiel a la Vega and others
- "Verde Luz", a song written by Antonio Caban Vale which has become a virtual second national anthem for Puerto Rico
- "Ensillando mi caballo", a set of décimas written by Pérez, at the suggestion of Corretjer, using a popular South American verse as the "pie forzado" (basis) of the song (it became the subject of a copyright dispute in 2006, when Perez discovered that his copyright had been granted to Corretjer by mistake and Corretjer's heirs could not allow him use of the song because of legal restrictions by the publishing agency, ACEMLA),
- "La vida campesina", a cover of a Pafu song with the same name. It was a popular medley of Puerto Rican jibaro songs which was Haciendo Punto's first radio hit,
- "Música", an ode to music written by Rodolfo "Rucco" Gandía, that became Haciendo Punto's second radio hit,
- "Agüeybaná", a homage to the Puerto Rican indigenous chief, curiously written by German-born Puerto Rican actor Axel Anderson,
- "Mujer de 26 años", a song about a disillusioned society girl who bitterly matures into a marriage of convenience, written by José Hernández Colón, the brother of former Puerto Rican governor Rafael Hernández Colón, and
- "Los caminos", a rumba sung by García and written by Cuban songwriter Pablo Milanés.

The album also features two parody songs, "Bolero de Mastropiero" (or merely "Bolero"), originally written by the Argentine musical comedy group Les Luthiers, and "Tango (di Vestimenta Interiore)", a popular and joking Argentinian tango in which Tony Croatto asks a former lover to give him back a particular piece of underwear.

== Discography ==
=== Studio albums ===
- Haciendo Punto en Otro Son (1976)
- Oubao Moin (1977)
- El Son Que Te Traigo Yo (1977)
- Haciendo Punto en Otro Son (1978)
- Tierra... Y Otros Cantares (1979)
- Son de la America Nuestra (1980)
- Morivivi (1981)
- Llegaremos (1983)
- Antología (1997)
- A mano Pelá (1999)
- Navidades En Su Punto (2003)
- Navidad En Otro Son (2006)

=== Live albums ===
- Punto Final (1986)
- El Concierto Original (1993)

== Television and videos ==
Haciendo Punto appeared on several TV shows. The most famous videos released on TV were "Un Abajito y Queriendo" and "Travesía" (winner of Premios ACE March 14, 1981, New York).

Un Junte para la Historia: The band reunited for a concert with Puerto Rican bands Fiel a la Vega and Moliendo Vidrio. During the concert, the bands alternated sets performing the hit songs of each other, ending with a huge "junte" of all of the musicians singing several songs of each band. The concert was recorded and released later as an album and video titled Un Junte para la Historia. (November, 1998)

El Concierto Original: Five original members reunited for a concert with the participation of local musicians. (televised by WAPA-TV in 2000)

Haciendo Punto por Tony: Homage to Tony Croatto. (televised by WAPA-TV May, 2005)
