= Los TNT =

Rock and Roll Band from the 1960s

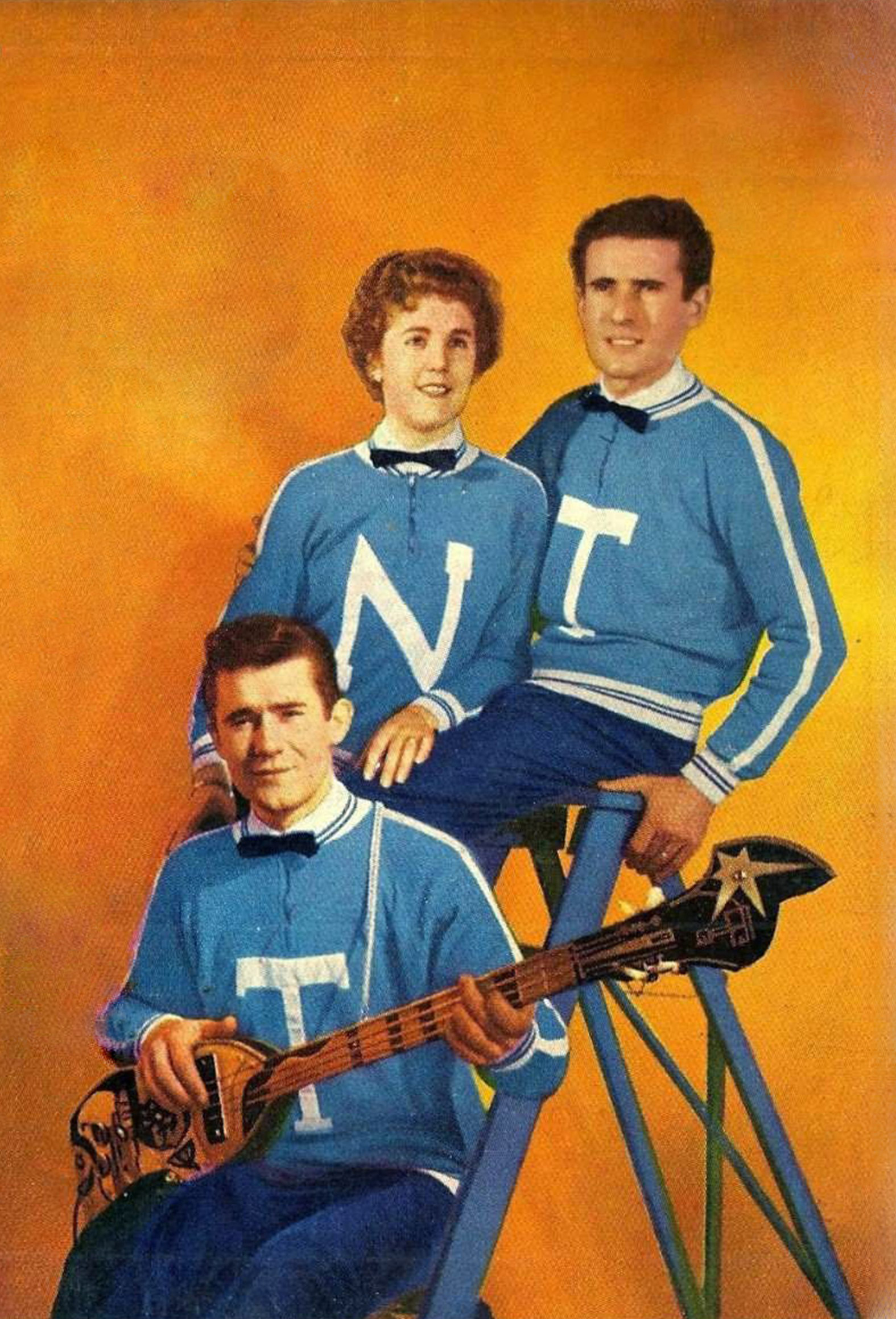

Background information
- Origin: Attimis, Italy
- Genres: Rock and roll Traditional Pop
- Years active: 1958–1966
- Label: RCA
- Past members: Nelly Croatto; Tim Croatto; Tony Croatto

Los TNT (Spanish pronunciation: [ˈlos ˈte ˈene ˈte]) were an Italian-Uruguayan rock 'n' roll band, popular in the 1960s. The band consisted of two brothers and a sister from Udine, Italy: Edelweiss "Tim" Croatto (1936 - 2022), Hermes "Tony" Croatto (1940 - 2005), and Argentina "Nelly" Croatto (born 1941). The acronym and word play TNT comes from their nicknames. The family emigrated to La Paz, Uruguay in 1946, and in 1953 they moved to Montevideo, where they started to sing.

In 1959 they moved to Buenos Aires, and they were discovered and hired by Argentine record label RCA Victor in 1960. Their first single was "Eso", which sold more than 100,000 copies in Argentina and became a success also in Mexico and most South American countries. Their first album, Los Fabulosos TNT, was published late in 1960. The second album, La Gira Triunfal por Latinoamérica de los TNT was published right after a tour through Venezuela, Colombia, Peru, and Chile, in 1961.

In 1962 they moved to Spain to work with record label Belter, and in 1964 they were chosen by Televisión Española (TVE) to represent the country (as Nelly, Tim & Tony) at the Eurovision Song Contest 1964 in Copenhagen, Denmark. With the song "Caracola", they placed 12th in a field of 16.

Nevertheless, in Spain they were not as successful as in Latin America and they returned to Argentina. In 1965 they recorded their last single with RCA, which included the songs "Yo No Me Marcho de Aquí" and "Llévame, Llévame".

In 1966 the band dissolved as Tim decided to leave to establish his own record label. Nelly and Tony continued to sing together, as Nelly y Tony or Los Vénetos, first established in Argentina and from 1970 in Puerto Rico. In 1974, Nelly got married and dissolved the duo; meanwhile Tony Croatto continued to work as an entertainer in Puerto Rico until his death in 2005.

Preceded by José Guardiola with "Algo prodigioso"	Spain in the Eurovision Song Contest; 1964	Succeeded by Conchita Bautista with "Qué bueno, qué bueno"
