= Jorge Arraiza =

Puerto Rican musician

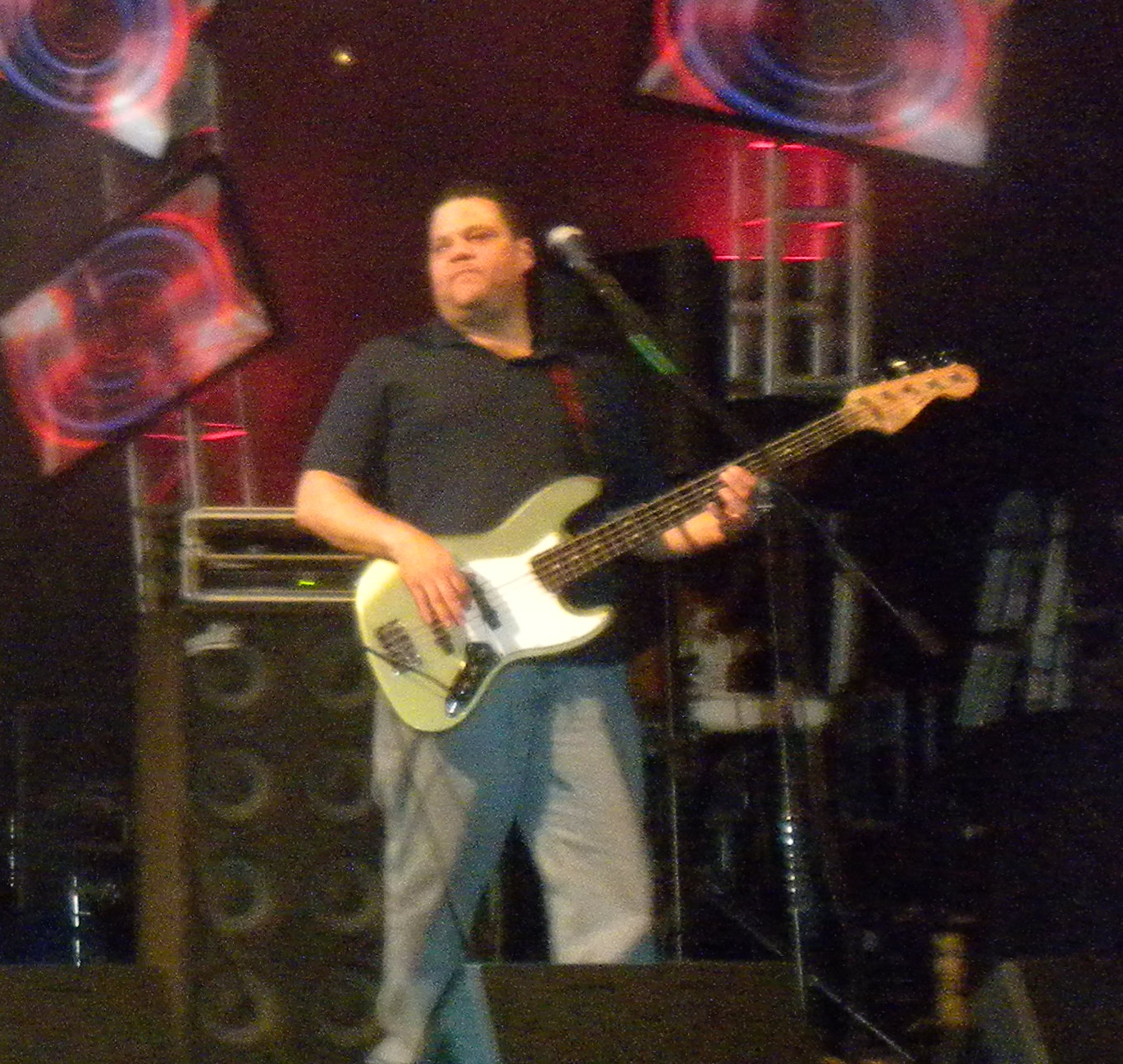
- Arraiza playing at Mayaguez, Puerto Rico in 2010.

Background information
- Born: June 27, 1970 (age 55)
- Origin: Vega Baja, Puerto Rico
- Genres: Rock en Español; Nueva trova Blues; Rock n Roll
- Occupation: Musician
- Instruments: vocals bass
- Years active: 1986-present
- Member of: Fiel a la Vega
- Formerly of: Los Arraiza Voladores; Good Acoustics
- Website: https://www.facebook.com/fielalavega

Jorge Arraiza (born June 27, 1970, in San Juan, Puerto Rico) is a Puerto Rican musician most known for being the bassist of the Rock en Español band Fiel a la Vega.

== Biography ==
Jorge Arraiza playing in Villalba, Puerto Rico (2004)

Jorge Arraiza is one of the sons of Manuel Arraiza and Eneida González. When he was 12 years old, he received an acoustic guitar and, pressed by his brother José, develops an interest for the rhythm & blues. At this time, he also starts listening to The Who becoming a huge fan of John Entwistle whom he credits as his biggest influence.

In 1986, he formed a band with his cousin Milo called Crossroads. His intention was to play music of the 1960s and the 1970s, but singer Tito Auger wanted to focus on Top 40 hits. The band shortly disbanded and Arraiza kept on working with his brothers (José and Pedro) forming a band called Los Arraiza Voladores in 1989, also with cousin Milo.

In 1994, he reunited with Tito Auger and Ricky Laureano to form the band Fiel a la Vega. The band quickly achieved great success on the island releasing several radio hits and winning several awards.

In 2010, Jorge graduated cooking school at Ana G Mendez University and has alternated between cooking jobs and gigs with Fiel a la Vega, as well as featuring with Repli-K (an 80s and 90s cover band).

In 2016, Los Arraiza Voladores released their CD "Blues Gobierno y Otros Males Sociales" recorded and produced by Ricky Laurerano.

In July 2020, Field a la Vega held a virtual concert with half a million viewers in attendance.

As of 2020, Fiel a la Vega has released five studio albums, three live albums (one acoustic, one symphonic, one electric) and two concert DVDs, as well as having filled every venue in the island.

== See also ==
- Music in Puerto Rico
- Puerto Rican rock
