= Cubadisco =

Music festival and awards event in Cuba

Cubadisco is a week-long music festival and awards event celebrating Cuban music. It is held in Havana City, Cuba, and was established in 1997.

There are 25 award categories. Each year the event celebrates a particular country and genre. There are also tributes to artists and personalities from the Cuban music scene. Expositions, conferences, discussions, concerts, and music release parties are part of the festivities across various theaters and other venues.

In the wake of the nationalization of Cuba's music industry, EGREM controlled music production activities in Cuba until the late 1980s when independent labels reemerged.
