= Ricky Laureano =

American musician

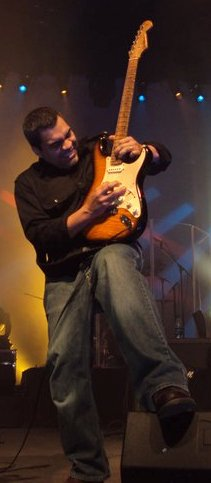

Background information
- Born: Enrique Laureano; 3 August 1969 (age 56); Vega Alta, Puerto Rico
- Genres: Rock en Español, Nueva Trova
- Occupations: Musician, songwriter, Vocalist, producer
- Instruments: Guitar, Acoustic guitar, Bass, Cuatro
- Years active: 1987–present
- Labels: EMI Latin, Independent

Ricky Laureano (born August 3, 1969) is a Puerto Rican musician most known for being the guitarist and one of the main songwriters of the Rock en Español band Fiel a la Vega.

== Biography ==
Ricky Laureano playing in Villalba, Puerto Rico (2004)

Ricky Laureano met Tito Auger in the late 80s. Together they formed another band called Farenheitt. The band recorded a single with the first writing collaborations of Auger and Laureano. Their first songs were titled "Maryann" and "I'd Been Looking". In 1990, Laureano and Auger decide to seriously pursue a career in music and they moved to the United States, specifically in New Jersey. Three months later, Auger's father died and he returned to Puerto Rico. Laureano stayed there and started playing with a band called Pure Myth. Two years later, upon Auger's return they reunited again.

After returning to Puerto Rico, Laureano and Auger reunited with friends Jorge and Pedro Arraiza, with whom they had played before and formed Fiel a la Vega. The band quickly achieved great success in the island releasing several radio hits and winning several awards. As of 2019, the band has released five studio albums, three live albums, a compilation, and has performed hundreds of concerts through Puerto Rico and the United States. They have also won several awards.

Since 2010, the band has reduced their presentations, which has allowed Laureano to work on his own music. Through the last years, he has recorded and released numerous singles and EPs which he has made available through his own website. In 2017, Laureano recorded his first full-length album in which he sang and recorded all the instruments. The eponymous album features twelve songs, all written by Laureano.

== See also ==
- Music in Puerto Rico
- Puerto Rican rock
