= Tito Auger =

Puerto Rican musician

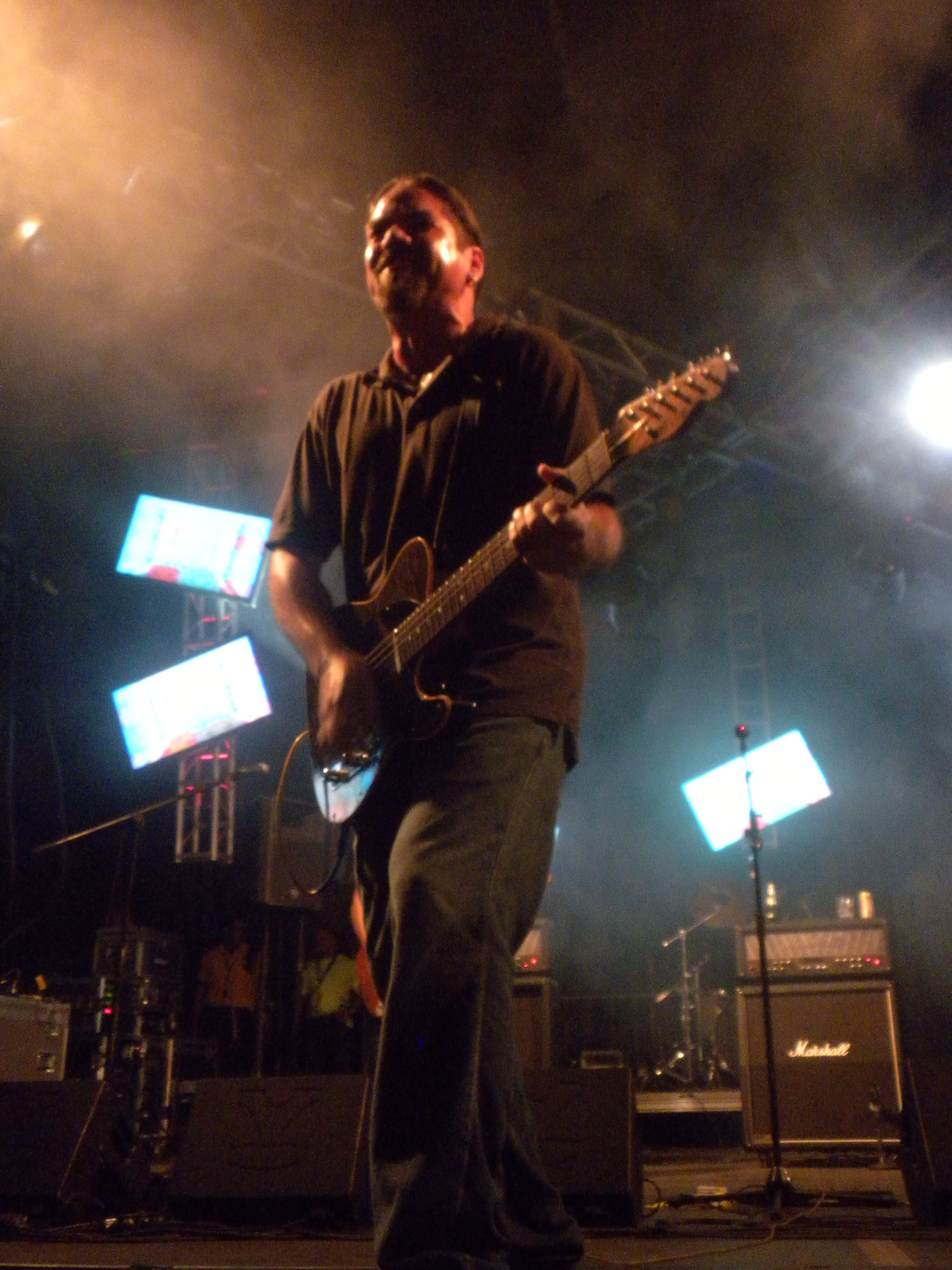
- Auger playing at Mayaguez, Puerto Rico in 2010.

Background information
- Also known as: Tito
- Born: Alfonso Auger Vega; March 3, 1968 (age 58)
- Origin: Vega Alta, Puerto Rico
- Genres: Rock en Español; Nueva trova
- Occupation: Musician
- Instruments: vocals guitar
- Years active: 1983-present
- Website: www.fielalavega.com

Alfonso "Tito" Auger Vega (born 3 March 1968, in Vega Alta, Puerto Rico) is a Puerto Rican musician best known for being the lead singer of the Rock en Español band Fiel a la Vega. Auger is also the band's main songwriter, together with Ricky Laureano.

== Biography ==
=== Early years and schooling ===
Auger was born in Hato Rey, Puerto Rico, and grew up in the town of Vega Alta. He is the son of Alfonso Auger Cabrera and Olga Vega Colón. Auger studied in the Nuestra Señora del Rosario school in Vega Baja. He followed his studies at the Universidad del Sagrado Corazón in San Juan where he received a bachelor's degree in Communications in 1990. As a young man, he migrated to New Jersey in the hope of becoming a rock star.

=== Interest in music ===
Auger started in music when he was 15 years old, playing the guitar. When he was 18, he was invited by some childhood friends (Emilio and Jorge Arraiza among them) to play in a band called Crossroads. The band performed mostly in the local area of Vega Alta and Vega Baja, and primarily played cover songs of popular American artists of the time like Bryan Adams, REO Speedwagon, and others.

Tito Auger playing in Caguas, Puerto Rico (2004)

Around this time, he began writing music, with his first song "Neverending Wait", written in English. Shortly after, Auger met guitarist Ricky Laureano. Together they formed another band called Farenheitt. The band recorded a single with the first writing collaborations of Auger and Laureano. Their first songs were titled "Maryann" and "I'd Been Looking". His music and style have been termed latin rock and urban trova.

=== With Fiel a la Vega ===
After returning to Puerto Rico, Auger and Laureano reunited with friends Jorge and Pedro Arraiza, with whom they had played before and formed Fiel a la Vega. The band quickly achieved great success in the island releasing several radio hits and winning several awards. As of 2007, the band has released four studio albums. In 2001, Auger and Laureano took time away from their band to create "Cancion para Vieques" (Song to Vieques), to protest the United States occupation of the Puerto Rican island of Vieques.

=== Other collaborations ===
Outside of the band, Auger has collaborated with other artists as both a performer and songwriter. Recently, he collaborated with popular Puerto Rican folk singer, Roy Brown, and American folk musician Tao Rodríguez-Seeger (from The Mammals), in an album called Que Vaya Bien. The group toured the island together promoting a song called "El Banquete de los Sánchez" written by Brown, and based on a poem by Luis Rafael Sánchez. Brown is one of Fiel a la Vega's main influences and they had performed together previously. Brown's most famous song, "Boricua en la Luna", has been covered by the band and is a staple in the band's live set.

== See also ==
- Music in Puerto Rico
- Puerto Rican rock
