= Nueva trova =

Movement in Cuban music

Nueva Trova ([ˈnweβa ˈtɾoβa], "new trova") is a movement in Cuban music that emerged around 1967–1968 after the Cuban Revolution of 1959, and the consequent political and social changes.

Nueva Trova has its roots in the traditional trova, but differs from it because its content is, in the widest sense, political. It combines traditional folk music idioms with 'progressive' and often politicized lyrics. It is related to nueva canción in Latin America, especially Chile and Argentina. Some of the Nueva Trova musicians were also influenced by rock and pop of that time.

Nueva Trova is defined by its connection with the Cuban revolution, and by its lyrics, which tried to escape the banalities of life by concentrating on socialism, injustice, sexism, colonialism, racism and similar issues. Haydée Santamaría was the creator and sponsor of this movement.

== Influences ==
Nueva Trova was one aspect of the Pan-Latin American "new song movement" which tended to use lyrics that were self-consciously literary, formal and schooled. Another influence was that of filín (feeling), a romantic song movement of the late 1940s to the early 1960s. Pablo Milanés, for one, was a filín singer.

At approximately the same time as the rise of Nueva Trova, similar musical genres across the world were increasing in popularity as part of a roots revival; these involved the popularization of traditional music welded with socio-political lyrics. Nueva Trova was most closely influenced by South American (especially Chilean) nueva canción, Spanish Nova Cançó, Bolivian canto nuevo, Portuguese canto livre and nova canção, and Brazilian Tropicalismo. At about the same time, Puerto Ricans like Roy Brown, Andrés Jiménez, Antonio Cabán Vale and the group Haciendo Punto en Otro Son also became popular.

Though inspired by American protest artists like Bob Dylan and Joan Baez, Nueva Trova criticized the abuses of the United States government and its allies. Other major influences include The Beatles, Chilean revivalist Violeta Parra, Uruguayan singer-songwriter Daniel Viglietti and the Catalan protest singer Joan Manuel Serrat.

In both Cuba and Puerto Rico, the politicized lyrics of Nueva Trova were very often critical of the United States; Puerto Rican singers were especially critical of Vieques' continued use as a United States Navy training ground.

Nueva Trova is defined, not only by its connection with Castro's revolution, but also by its lyrics. The lyrics try to escape the banalities of life (e.g. love) by concentrating on socialism, injustice, sexism, colonialism, racism and similar 'serious' issues. Silvio Rodríguez, Noel Nicola, and Pablo Milanés became the most important exponents of this style. Carlos Puebla and Joseíto Fernández were long-time trova singers who added their weight to the new regime, but of the two only Puebla wrote special pro-revolution songs.

The government gave support to musicians willing to write and sing anti-U.S. and pro-revolution songs. This was an additional incentive in a period when many of the traditional musicians found it difficult or impossible to earn a living.

In 1967, the Casa de las Américas in Havana held a Festival de la canción de protesta (protest songs). Tania Castellanos, a filín singer and author, wrote ¡Por Ángela! in support of Angela Davis. César Portillo de la Luz wrote Oh, valeroso Viet Nam.

Although Nueva Trova expressed the socio-economic issues of Cuba, later on some musicians chose to express these issues through Rap Cubano which they viewed as more pure and more to the street.

== Decline ==
Nueva Trova had its heyday in the 1970s, but was already declining before the fall of the Soviet Union. Examples of non-political styles in the Nueva Trova movement can be found, such as Liuba María Hevia, whose lyrics are focused on more traditional subjects such as love and solitude, though like others in the movement deploying a highly poetical style. On the other side of the spectrum, Carlos Varela is famous in Cuba for his open criticism of some aspects of Castro's revolution.

Nueva Trova was dealt a blow by the fall of the Soviet Union. It became less popular inside Cuba and also externally, in vivid contrast to the Buena Vista Social Club film and recordings, highlighting the extraordinary charm and musical quality of the older forms of Cuban music. Nevertheless Nueva Trova songs and albums of high musical and lyrical quality, such as Carlos Puebla's Hasta siempre, remain popular.

== Notable people ==
- Santiago Feliú, Cuban singer and songwriter
- Pablo Milanés, Cuban musician, composer, songwriter and guitarist
- Noel Nicola, Cuban singer and songwriter
- Silvio Rodriguez, Cuban musician, songwriter, guitarist, and poet
- Carlos Varela, Cuban singer and songwriter

== See also ==
- List of socialist songs
