= Lost and Found (Buena Vista Social Club album) =

Compilation album by Buena Vista Social Club
- Released: March 25, 2015
- Recorded: March 1996 (over seven days)
- Studio: Egrem studio, Havana, Cuba and other sessions
- Genre: Son cubano, bolero, descarga, danzón, guajira, criolla
- Length: 45:43
- Label: World Circuit, Nonesuch
- Producer: Nick Gold, Ry Cooder

Buena Vista Social Club chronology
At Carnegie Hall (2008)	Lost and Found (2015)

Professional ratings
Review scores
Source	Rating
AllMusic	4/5 stars
Drowned in Sound	8/10 stars
The Guardian	4/5 stars
NPR	(favorable)
PopMatters	7/10 stars
Rolling Stone	3.5/5 stars

Lost and Found is a compilation album, and the third under the Buena Vista Social Club name, released on March 25, 2015, on World Circuit Records and Nonesuch Records. It is a mixture of leftover tracks from the Egrem studio sessions, and from a string of dates through the late 1990s and early 2000s, and live performances from the band in the years that followed.

== Background ==
Following its release, the original Buena Vista Social Club album was an international best seller, and the most successful album in the history of Cuban music. The band was also profiled in the film of the same name, directed by Wim Wenders, in which the Cuban musicians travelled to Amsterdam and New York City as a full line-up in 1998. The latter performance was recorded and released as a live album in 2008. This newfound attention allowed solo albums to be recorded by Ibrahim Ferrer, Eliades Ochoa, Manuel "Guajiro" Mirabal, Jesús "Aguaje" Ramos, Omara Portuondo, Rubén González and Cachaíto López. Orquesta Buena Vista Social Club, a core band featuring several of the original musicians, continued to sell out shows worldwide and embarked on a farewell "Adios" tour in 2015.

When asked about a possible album of leftover tracks from the Egrem studio sessions, producer Nick Gold said:

Over the years we were often asked what unreleased material was left in the vaults. We knew of some gems, favourites amongst the musicians, but we were always too busy working on the next project to go back and see what else we had. When we eventually found the time, we were astonished at how much wonderful music there was.

== Track listing ==
All tracks produced by Nick Gold, except tracks 2 and 12, which are produced by Ry Cooder.

1. "Bruca maniguá" – 5:16
2. "Macusa" – 4:05
3. "Tiene Sabor" – 3:18
4. "Bodas de Oro" – 4:40
5. "Black Chicken 37" – 3:33
6. "Habanera" – 2:17
7. "Como Fue" – 4:01
8. "Guajira en F" – 4:21
9. "Quiéreme Mucho" – 1:29
10. "Pedacito de Papel" – 2:38
11. "Mami Me Gustó" – 5:18
12. "Lágrimas negras" – 4:05
13. "Como Siento Yo" – 1:54
14. Bonus Track: "Rubén Sings!" – 0:48

== Personnel ==
- Ibrahim Ferrer, vocals (tracks 1, 7 and 11), coro (track 2)
- Demetrio Muñiz, band leader, trombone, coro (tracks 1, 7 and 11)
- Adolfo Pichardo, piano (tracks 1, 7 and 11)
- Orlando "Cachaíto" López, bass (tracks 1–5, 7, 8, 11 and 12)
- Angel Terry Domech, congas (tracks 1, 7 and 11)
- Filiberto Sánchez, timbales (tracks 1, 7 and 11)
- Roberto García, bongos (tracks 1, 7 and 11)
- Lázaro Villa, maracas, coro (tracks 1, 7 and 11)
- Manuel "Guajiro" Mirabal, trumpet (tracks 1, 4, 6–8 and 11), coro (tracks 1, 4, 7 and 11)
- Alejandro Pichardo, trumpet, coro (tracks 1, 4, 7, 8 and 11)
- Jesús "Aguaje" Ramos, trombone, coro (tracks 1, 4, 7, 8 and 11), band leader (tracks 4 and 8), trombone (tracks 4 and 8)
- Javier Zalba, alto, soprano saxophone (tracks 1, 7 and 11)
- Pantaleón Sánchez, alto sax (tracks 1, 7 and 11)
- Rafael "Jimmy" Jenks, tenor sax (tracks 1, 5, 7 and 11)
- Tony Jiménez, tenor sax (tracks 1, 7 and 11)
- Ventura Gutiérrez, baritone sax (tracks 1, 7 and 11)
- Eliades Ochoa, vocals, guitar (tracks 2, 9, 10 and 12)
- Compay Segundo, vocals, guitar (track 2)
- Juan de Marcos González, coro and conductor (track 2)
- Carlos González, bongos (tracks 2, 5 and 12), claves (track 3)
- Joachim Cooder, dumbek (tracks 2 and 12)
- Alberto "Virgilio" Valdés, maracas (tracks 2, 3, 5 and 12), coro (track 12)
- Omara Portuondo, vocals (tracks 3 and 12)
- Manuel Galbán, acoustic guitar (track 3), electric guitar (tracks 4 and 8)
- Swami Jr., seven-string guitar (track 3)
- Jorge Chicoy, electric guitar (track 3)
- Ramses M. González, drums (track 3)
- Amadito Valdés, timbales (tracks 3–5 and 8)
- Julián Corrales, violin (track 3)
- Enrique Lazaga, guiro (track 3, 4 and 8)
- Caridad Valdés Menéndez, Yaremi Alfonso Nápoles, Idania Valdés Casuso and Riena Hernández Centeno, coro (track 3)
- Rubén González, piano solo (track 4), piano (track 13)
- Rubencito González, piano (track 4)
- Miguel "Angá" Díaz, congas (tracks 4, 5 and 8)
- Carlitos González, bongos (tracks 4 and 8)
- Miguelito Valdés, trumpet solo (tracks 4 and 8)
- Luis Alemañy Conde, Yanko Pisaco and Yaure Muñiz, trumpet (tracks 4 and 8)
- Pedro Depestre, violin (track 5)
- Carlos M. Calunga, vocal (track 8)
- Roberto Fonseca, piano (track 8)
- Barbarito Torres, laúd (track 12)

Additional personnel

- Recorded and mixed by Jerry Boys
- Mastered by Tom Leader and Bernie Grundman
- Archive research and additional production by Tim Jenkinson
- Photography by Christien Jaspars and Karl Haimel
- Designed by House at Intro
- Sleeve notes by Nigel Williamson

== Charts ==
=== Weekly charts ===
Weekly chart performance for Lost and Found
Chart (2015)	Peak position
Belgian Albums (Ultratop Flanders)	33
Belgian Albums (Ultratop Wallonia)	51
Dutch Albums (Album Top 100)	7
Finnish Albums (Suomen virallinen lista)	37
French Albums (SNEP)	87
German Albums (Offizielle Top 100)	95
Irish Albums (IRMA)	81
Italian Albums (FIMI)	75
New Zealand Albums (RMNZ)	38
Swiss Albums (Schweizer Hitparade)	48
UK Albums (OCC)	86
US Top Latin Albums (Billboard)	2
US Tropical Albums (Billboard)	1
US World Albums (Billboard)	1

=== Year-end charts ===
Year-end chart performance for Lost and Found
Chart (2015)	Position
Belgian Albums (Ultratop Flanders)	187
US Top Latin Albums (Billboard)	27
