= Buena Vista Social Club Presents Ibrahim Ferrer =

Studio album by Ibrahim Ferrer
- Released: June 8, 1999
- Recorded: March 1998
- Studio: EGREM, Havana, Cuba; Livingston Studios, London, UK
- Genre: Canción, bolero, son cubano, guajira, guaguancó, son montuno
- Length: 52:05
- Language: Spanish
- Label: World Circuit / Nonesuch
- Producer: Ry Cooder, Nick Gold, Juan de Marcos González

Ibrahim Ferrer chronology
Buena Vista Social Club Presents Ibrahim Ferrer (1999)	Buenos Hermanos (2003)

Buena Vista Social Club Presents Ibrahim Ferrer is the first studio album by Cuban singer Ibrahim Ferrer. It was released on June 8, 1999, through World Circuit, and was one of the top ten selling Latin albums in the US in that year.

== Recording ==
The album was recorded in March, 1998.

== Critical reception ==
Professional ratings
Review scores
Source	Rating
AllMusic	4.5/5 stars

AllMusic reviewer David Lavin commented: "Ferrer's album is pleasant, the kind of album you could put on during brunch on a sunny morning. (...) One standout is "Mami Me Gusto," a rolling upbeat tune by the legendary Cuban composer/bandleader Arsenio Rodríguez. (...) The rest of the album is nice, but rarely as inspired or joyous as the original Buena Vista release. If you're looking for classy cocktail party music that will hold the attention of music fans, and won't bother the uninterested, look no further."

In his review for fRoots magazine, Jon Lusk stated: "The new album strikes a perfect balance between continuity and innovation. There's still that suave subtle old-time acoustic vibe, but there are also plenty of pleasant surprises. (...) Ferrer is said to have hankered to do more boleros throughout his career, and his wish is finally granted here in abundance. The slower tempos predominate, though there are also wonderful examples of guaguancó, son and guajira. The choice of composers reflects his personal history as the little man in the background who has finally got to make the hit album he always wanted."

At the 42nd Annual Grammy Awards in 2000, Buena Vista Social Club Presents Ibrahim Ferrer received a nomination for Best Tropical Traditional Latin Performance. At the inaugural Latin Grammy Awards in the same year, the record was nominated for Traditional Tropical Album, Best Engineered Album, and while Ferrer himself won the award for Best New Artist. At the 2000 Billboard Latin Music Awards, the album won the award for Tropical Album of the Year by a New Artist and was nominated Tropical Album of the Year by a Male Artist.

== Track listing ==
1. "Bruca Maniguá" (Arsenio Rodríguez) – 4:44
2. "Herido De Sombras" (Pedro Vega Francia) – 4:11
3. "Marieta" (Faustino Oramas) – 5:55
4. "Guateque Campesino" (Celia Romero) – 5:09
5. "Mami Me Gustó" (Arsenio Rodríguez) – 5:04
6. "Nuestra Ultima Cita" (Armando Medina) – 3:56
7. "Cienfuegos Tiene Su Guaguanco" (Victor Lay) – 5:22
8. "Silencio" (Rafael Hernández) – 4:38
9. "Aquellos Ojos Verdes" (Nilo Menendez / Adolfo Utrera) – 4:54
10. "Qué Bueno Baila Usted" (Benny Moré) – 4:39
11. "Como Fue" (Ernesto Duarte) – 3:33

== Charts ==
=== Weekly charts ===
Chart (1999–2000)	Peak position
Austrian Albums (Ö3 Austria)	16
Belgian Albums (Ultratop Flanders)	16
Finnish Albums (Suomen virallinen lista)	9
French Albums (SNEP)	35
German Albums (Offizielle Top 100)	2
Dutch Albums (Album Top 100)	4
Norwegian Albums (VG-lista)	7
Scottish Albums (OCC)	72
Swedish Albums (Sverigetopplistan)	18
Swiss Albums (Schweizer Hitparade)	12
UK Albums (OCC)	42
UK Independent Albums (OCC)	8
US Billboard 200	137
US Top Latin Albums (Billboard)	2
US Tropical Albums (Billboard)	1

=== Year-end charts ===
Chart (1999)	Position
US Top Latin Albums (Billboard)	10
US Tropical Albums (Billboard)	4

Chart (2000)	Position
US Top Latin Albums (Billboard)	9
US Tropical Albums (Billboard)	5

== Certifications and sales ==
Region	Certification	Certified units/sales
Germany	—	230,000
United States (RIAA)	Gold	500,000^{^}
Summaries
Europe	—	500,000
^{^} Shipments figures based on certification alone.

== Personnel ==
=== Musicians ===
- Ibrahim Ferrer – vocals
- Rubén González – piano
- Manuel Galbán – electric guitar
- Orlando "Cachaíto" López – bass
- Amadito Valdés – timbales
- Ángel Terry Domech – congas
- Roberto García – bongos
- Carlos González – bongos
- Alberto "Virgilio" Valdés – maracas
- Ibrahim Ferrer Jr. – clave
- Ry Cooder – electric guitar
- Joachim Cooder – udu drum, dumbek and drums
- Gil Bernal – tenor saxophone
- Lázaro Ordóñez Enríquez – violin
- Eliades Ochoa – guitar
- Papi Oviedo – tres
- Barbarito Torres – laúd
- Manuel "Guajiro" Mirabal – trumpet
- Octavio Calderón – trumpet
- Carmelo González – trumpet
- Yanko Pisaco Pichardo – trumpet
- Alejandro Pichardo Pérez – trumpet
- Daniel Ramos – trumpet
- Jesús "Aguaje" Ramos – trombone
- Jorge Leal – trombone
- Alberto Muñoz – trombone
- Carlos Montenegro Ruíz – alto saxophone
- José Ramírez Nurque – alto saxophone
- Antonio Francisco Jiménez Sánchez – tenor saxophone
- Braulio Hernández Rodríguez – tenor saxophone
- Adrian Corzo González – tenor saxophone
- Julián Corrales Subidá – 1st violin
- Alyoth Marichal Castillo – 1st violin
- Pedro Depestre González – 1st violin
- José Conyedo Román – 1st violin
- José Pérez Fuentes – 2nd violin
- Ariel Sarduy Méndez – 2nd violin
- Rogelio Martínez Muguercia – 2nd violin
- Humberto Legat Yera – 2nd violin
- Lenor Bermúdez Bermúdez – viola
- Rafael Cutiño Diequez – viola
- Angél Zaldívar Copello – viola, cello
- Roy Ávila Serrano – cello
- Andrés Escalona Graña – bass
- Aleida Espinosa – bass

=== Singers ===
- Pío Leyva – chorus vocals
- Manuel "Puntillita" Licea – chorus vocals
- José Antonio "Maceo" Rodríguez – vocals, chorus vocals
- Lázaro Villa – chorus vocals
- Teresa García Caturla – chorus vocals
- Omara Portuondo – chorus vocals
- Michelle Alderete Espigul – vocals (Gema Cuatro)
- Estela Guzmán Vega – vocals (Gema Cuatro)
- Laura Flores Hernández – vocals (Gema Cuatro)
- Odette Tellería Orduña – vocals (Gema Cuatro)

=== Production ===
- Ry Cooder – producer
- Nick Gold – executive producer
- Juan de Marcos González – consultant and coordinator
- Jerry Boys – engineer, mixing, mastering
- Tom Leader – assistant mastering engineer
- Jenny Adlington – project manager
- Francesca Clarke – translation
- Sigfredo Ariel – song transcriptions and research
- Karl Haimel – photography
- Susan Titelman – photography
- Donata Wenders – photography
- The Team – design

== See also ==
- 1999 in Latin music
- List of number-one Billboard Tropical Albums from the 1990s
