= Rhythms del Mundo =

2006 compilation album by various artists

Rhythms del Mundo: Cuba

Compilation album by Various Artists
- Released: November 14, 2006
- Recorded: 2005–2006
- Genre: Salsa, mambo, son, bolero, tropical, Latin
- Label: Universal Music
- Producer: Kenny Young, Berman Brothers

Rhythms del Mundo chronology
Rhythms del Mundo: Cuba (2006)	Rhythms del Mundo Classics (2009)

Rhythms del Mundo is a nonprofit collaborative album, which fuses an all-star cast of Cuban musicians including Ibrahim Ferrer and Omara Portuondo of the Buena Vista Social Club with tracks from US, UK and Irish artists such as Dido, Arctic Monkeys, U2, Coldplay, Sting, Jack Johnson, Maroon 5, Franz Ferdinand, Kaiser Chiefs and others. A follow-up album, Rhythms del Mundo Classics, was released in 2009.

== Background ==
Kenny Young, Founder and Trustee of APE, explains how the project emerged: "The project was sparked off by the devastating 2004 Indian Ocean tsunami. The idea came in to do a project with The Buena Vista Social Club to fuse their Latin sounds with Western artists and their familiar popular songs. The project evolved when more environmental disasters struck—the Asian Earthquakes and Hurricane Katrina. But the big picture was climate change. You can call these natural disasters but after all the research and scientific data, we know that we're at least partly to blame for some of these disasters. Global warming is now in the news daily. If we don't act in the time frame our experts give us, our grandchildren will curse us eternally."

Thom Yorke comments, "We need a law, we need to have the Government put climate change in its place. If you leave industry to sort it out on a voluntary basis that's never going to happen. So everybody, if they've got any concerns about climate change, has to register that concern with their Government officials because it's the only way to go."

== Charity ==
Album proceeds benefits the environmental nonprofit organization Artists Project Earth, which raises awareness and funds for climate change projects and for disaster relief efforts. The artists on this album fully support the record as a commitment to the music and to the cause that it endorses.

== Music ==
The main recording sessions took place in Havana at Abdala Studios from April 2005 to June 2006 and mixed at Lazy Moon Studios (UK). While the majority of the vocals remain the same, the musicians of the Buena Vista Social Club reworked the original orchestration from each song and created something utterly unique, casting their trademark mastery over each track. Rhythms Del Mundo includes restructured tracks such as "Clocks" by Coldplay, "Better Together" by Jack Johnson, "She Will Be Loved" by Maroon 5, "High and Dry" by Radiohead, "Dancing Shoes" by Arctic Monkeys and "Modern Way" by Kaiser Chiefs, as well as other popular songs.

Rhythms Del Mundo also includes music by famed Cuban singers Omara Portuondo and the last vocal recording of Afro-Cuban bolero singer, Ibrahim Ferrer, who died in 2005. The other Cuban musicians from The Buena Vista Social Club who perform on this album are as follows: Barbarito Torres, Amadito Valdés, Virgilio Valdes, Angel Terri Domech, Manuel "Guajiro" Mirabal, Orlando "Cachaíto" López and Demetrio Muniz. This project is the brainchild and concept of Kenny Young, Ron Oehl and the Berman Brothers. They produced the 16 new original recordings on the CD.

=== Track listing ===
1. "Clocks" – Coldplay – 5:01
2. "Better Together" – Jack Johnson – 3:27
3. "Dancing Shoes" – Arctic Monkeys – 2:29
4. "One Step Too Far" – Dido & Faithless – 3:17
5. "As Time Goes By" – Ibrahim Ferrer – 3:10
6. "I Still Haven't Found What I'm Looking For" – U2 & Coco Freeman – 4:53
7. "She Will Be Loved" – Maroon 5 – 4:05
8. "Modern Way" – Kaiser Chiefs – 3:58
9. "Killing Me Softly" – Omara Portuondo (cover song of Roberta Flack) – 4:27
10. "Ai no Corrida" – Vania Borges feat. Quincy Jones (cover song of Chaz Jankel) – 4:30
11. "Fragilidad" – Sting – 4:17
12. "Don't Know Why" – Vania Borges (cover song of Norah Jones) – 3:10
13. "Hotel Buena Vista" – Aquila Rose & Idania Valdez – 3:27
14. "The Dark of the Matinee" – Coco Freeman feat. Franz Ferdinand – 3:58
15. "High and Dry" – El Lele de Los Van Van feat. Radiohead (samples) – 5:14
16. "Casablanca (As Time Goes By)" – Ibrahim Ferrer & Omara Portuondo – 3:10

In Summer 2008, the first follow-up album, Rhythms del Mundo – Cubano Alemán was released in Germany, with some popular German artists recording Cuban remakes of their songs in Cuba and other artists sending their songs to Cuba, waiting for a Cuban remake to rerecord the voice over the now Latin music recorded in Cuba by Cuban artists. The CD was a charity project for a climate protection project, "Artists' Project Earth".

In July 2009, the second follow-up album Rhythms del Mundo Classics was released, featuring artists like The Killers, Amy Winehouse, Keane, Jack Johnson, The Rolling Stones, KT Tunstall and others.

== Reception ==
Professional ratings
Review scores
Source	Rating
Allmusic	4.5/5 stars
Rolling Stone	2/5 stars

AMG rates Rhythms del Mundo: Cuba with 4.5 out of 5 stars and goes on to praise the flawless musicianship, the inspired arrangements and also the timeless quality of some of the tracks.

== Chart performance ==
Chart (2006)/(2007)	Peak position
Belgium (Flanders) Albums Chart	22
Belgium (Wallonia) Albums Chart	94
French Albums Chart	59
Mexican Albums Chart	34
Swiss Albums Chart	11
U.S. Billboard Top World Albums	74

=== Year-end chart ===
End of year chart (2007)	Position
German Albums Chart	50

== Sales and certifications ==
Region	Certification	Certified units/sales
Greece (IFPI Greece)	Gold	7,500^{^}
^{^} Shipments figures based on certification alone.
