= Buena Vista Social Club =

Cuban musical ensemble

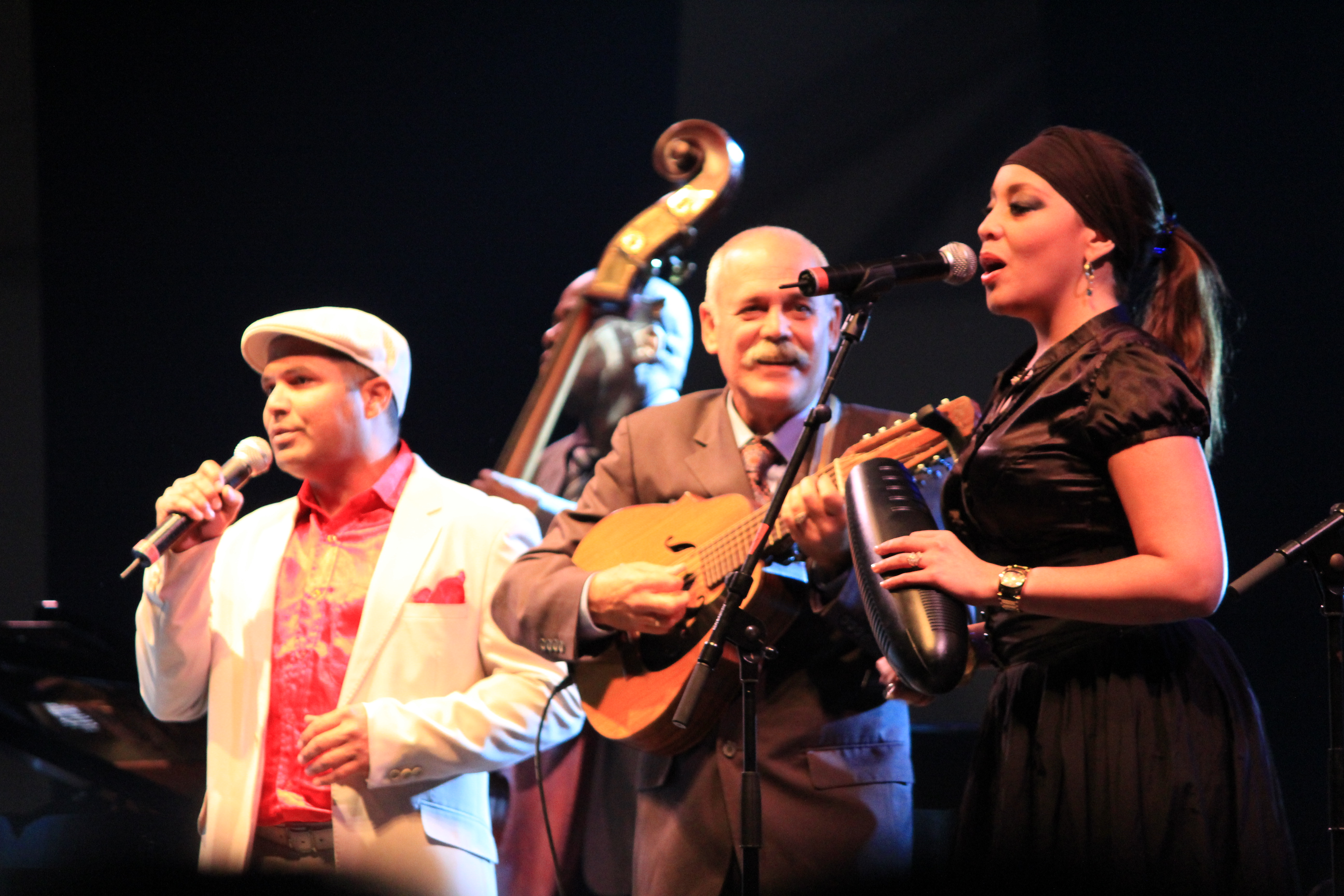
- Carlos Calunga, Barbarito Torres and Idania Valdés performing with Orquesta Buena Vista Social Club in 2012

Background information
- Origin: Havana, Cuba
- Genres: Son cubano; bolero; guajira; danzón
- Years active: 1996–2015
- Labels: World Circuit; Nonesuch
- Past members: § Musicians
- Website: buenavistasocialclub.com

Buena Vista Social Club was a musical ensemble primarily made up of Cuban musicians, formed in 1996. The project was organized by World Circuit executive Nick Gold, produced by American guitarist Ry Cooder and directed by Juan de Marcos González. They named the group after the members' club of the same name in the Buenavista quarter of Havana, a popular music venue in the 1940s. To showcase the popular styles of the time, such as son, bolero and danzón, they recruited a dozen veteran musicians, some of whom had been retired for many years.

The group's eponymous studio album was recorded in March 1996 and released in September 1997, quickly becoming an international success, which prompted the ensemble to perform with a full line-up in Amsterdam and New York in 1998. German director Wim Wenders captured the performance on film for a documentary—also called Buena Vista Social Club—that included interviews with the musicians conducted in Havana. Wenders' film was released in June 1999 to critical acclaim, receiving an Academy Award nomination for Best Documentary feature and winning numerous accolades including Best Documentary at the European Film Awards. This was followed up by a second documentary Buena Vista Social Club: Adios in 2017.

The success of both the album and film sparked a revival of interest in traditional Cuban music and Latin American music in general. Some of the Cuban performers later released well-received solo albums and recorded collaborations with stars from different musical genres. The "Buena Vista Social Club" name became an umbrella term to describe these performances and releases, and has been likened to a brand label that encapsulates Cuba's "musical golden age" between the 1930s and 1950s. The new success was fleeting for the most recognizable artists in the ensemble: Compay Segundo, Rubén González, and Ibrahim Ferrer, who died aged 95, 84, and 78 respectively; Compay Segundo and González in 2003, then Ferrer in 2005.

Several surviving members of the Buena Vista Social Club, such as tresero (tres player) Eliades Ochoa, veteran singer Omara Portuondo, and laúd player Barbarito Torres currently tour worldwide.. A stage musical telling the story of the original group premiered on Broadway in 2025.

== The original Buenavista Social Club ==
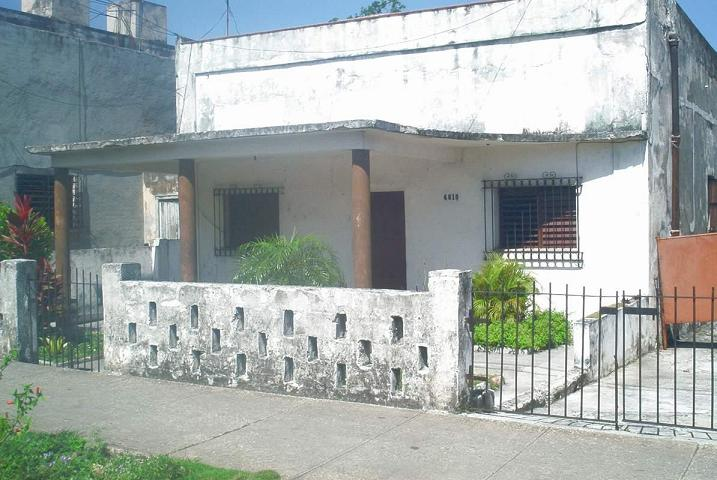
Abandoned building in Almendares, Marianao, that housed the Buenavista Social Club in the 1940s.

The Buenavista Social Club was a members-only club originally located in Buenavista (literally good view), a quarter in the current neighbourhood of Playa (before 1976 part of Marianao), one of the 15 municipalities in Cuba's capital, Havana. The original club was founded in 1932 in a small wooden venue at calle Consulado y pasaje "A" (currently calle 29, n. 6007). In 1939, due to lack of space the club relocated to number 4610 on Avenue 31, between calles 46 and 48, in Almendares, Marianao. This location is recalled by Juan Cruz, former director of the Marianao Social Club and master of ceremonies at the Salón Rosado de la Tropical (other nightclubs in Havana). As seen in the Buena Vista Social Club documentary, when musicians Ry Cooder, Compay Segundo and a film crew attempted to identify the location of the club in the 1990s, local people could not agree on where it had stood.

At the time, clubs in Cuba were segregated; there were sociedades de blancos (white societies), sociedades de negros (black societies), etc. The Buenavista Social Club operated as a black society, which was rooted in a cabildo. Cabildos were fraternities organized during the 19th century by African slaves. The existence of many other black societies such as Marianao Social Club, Unión Fraternal, Club Atenas (whose members included doctors and engineers), and Buenavista Social Club, exemplified the remnants of institutionalized racial discrimination against Afro-Cubans. These societies operated as recreational centers where workers went to drink, play games, dance and listen to music. In the words of Ry Cooder,

Society in Cuba and in the Caribbean including New Orleans, as far as I know, was organized around these fraternal social clubs. There were clubs of cigar wrappers, clubs for baseball players and they'd play sports and cards—whatever it is they did in their club—and they had mascots, like dogs. At the Buena Vista Social Club, musicians went there to hang out with each other, like they used to do at musicians' unions in the U.S., and they'd have dances and activities.

As a music venue, the Buenavista Social Club experienced the peak of Havana's nightclub life, when charangas and conjuntos played several sets every night, going from club to club over the course of a week. Often, bands would dedicate songs to the clubs where they played. In the case of the Buenavista Social Club, an eponymous danzón was composed by Israel López "Cachao" in 1938, and performed with Arcaño y sus Maravillas. In addition, Arsenio Rodríguez dedicated "Buenavista en guaguancó" to the same place. Together with Orquesta Melodías del 40, the Maravillas and Arsenio's conjunto were known as Los Tres Grandes (The Big Three), drawing the largest audiences wherever they played. These vibrant times in Havana were described by pianist Rubén González, who played in Arsenio's conjunto, as "an era of real musical life in Cuba, when there was very little money to earn, but everyone played because they really wanted to".

=== After the Revolution ===
Shortly after the Cuban Revolution of 1959, newly elected Cuban President Manuel Urrutia Lleó, a devout Christian, began a program of closing gambling outlets, nightclubs, and other establishments associated with Havana's hedonistic lifestyle. This had an immediate impact on the livelihoods of local entertainers. As the Cuban government rapidly shifted towards the left in an effort to build a "classless and colourblind society", it struggled to define policy toward forms of cultural expression in the black community; expressions which had implicitly emphasized cultural differences. Consequently, the cultural and social centers were abolished, including the Afro-Cuban mutual aid Sociedades de Color in 1962, to make way for racially integrated societies. Private festivities were limited to weekend parties and organizers' funds were confiscated. The measures meant the closure of the Buenavista Social Club. Although the Cuban government continued to support traditional music after the revolution, certain favor was given to the politically charged nueva trova, and poetic singer-songwriters such as Silvio Rodríguez and Pablo Milanés. The emergence of pop music and salsa, a style derived from Cuban music but developed in the United States, meant that son music became even less common.

Cuban music experienced quite a radical change in the 1960s, as National Geographic notes:

Cuban dance music also witnessed dramatic change beginning in the late 1960s, as groups explored the fusion of Cuban son with American rock, jazz and funk styles. Groups such as Los Van Van and Irakere established modern forms of Cuban music, paving the way for new rhythms and dances to emerge as well as fresh concepts in instrumentation. ... Cuba's dance music had already inspired a change from the older son-style dances, as younger Cubans broke free of step-oriented dances...

The occurrence of these closures and the change in traditions is the simplest explanation of why many musicians were out of work, and why their style of music had declined before the Buena Vista Social Club made it popular again.

== Album ==
Buena Vista Social Club "Chan Chan" (1997)
30 second sample from Buena Vista Social Club's "Chan Chan", which, according to Ry Cooder, became the group's "calling card".

In 1996, American guitarist Ry Cooder had been invited to Havana by British world music producer Nick Gold of World Circuit Records to record a session in which African musicians from Mali were to collaborate with Cuban musicians. On Cooder's arrival (via Mexico to avoid the ongoing U.S. trade and travel embargo against Cuba), it transpired that the musicians from Mali had not received their visas and were unable to travel to Havana. Cooder and Gold changed their plans and decided to record an album of Cuban son music with local musicians.

Already on board the African collaboration project were Cuban musicians including bassist Orlando "Cachaíto" López, guitarist Eliades Ochoa and musical director Juan de Marcos González, who had himself been organizing a similar project for the Afro-Cuban All Stars. A search for additional musicians led the team to singer Manuel "Puntillita" Licea, pianist Rubén González and octogenarian singer Compay Segundo, who all agreed to record for the project.

Within three days of the project's birth, Cooder, Gold and de Marcos had organized a large group of performers and arranged for recording sessions to commence at Havana's EGREM Studios, formerly owned by RCA records, where the equipment and atmosphere had remained unchanged since the 1950s. Communication between the Spanish and English speakers at the studio was conducted via an interpreter, although Cooder reflected that "musicians understand each other through means other than speaking".

The album was recorded in just six days and contained fourteen tracks; opening with "Chan Chan" written by Compay Segundo, a four chord son that was to become what Cooder described as "the Buena Vista's calling card"; and ending with a rendition of "La Bayamesa", a romantic criolla composed by Sindo Garay (not to be confused with the Cuban national anthem of the same name). The sessions also produced material for the subsequent release, Introducing...Rubén González, which showcased the work of the Cuban pianist.

Buena Vista Social Club "Buena Vista Social Club" (1997)
30 second sample from Buena Vista Social Club' from the 1997 album of the same name, featuring the piano playing of Rubén González. The song was the Havana club's "mascot tune" in the 1940s.

One of the songs that featured on the album was "Buena Vista Social Club", a danzón written by Israel "Cachao" López, the uncle of bass player "Cachaíto" (though Cooder attributed it to Orestes López, the brother of Cachao and father Cachaíto). The song spotlighted the piano work of Rubén González and it was recorded after Cooder heard González improvising around the tune's musical theme before a day's recording session. After playing the piece, González explained to Cooder the history of the social club and that the song was the club's "mascot tune". When searching for a name for the overall project, manager Nick Gold chose the song's title. According to Cooder,

It should be the thing that sets it apart. It was a kind of club by then. Everybody was hanging out and we had rum and coffee around two in the afternoon. It felt like a club, so let's call it that. That's what gave it a handle.

Upon release on 17 September 1997, the CD became a huge "word of mouth hit", far beyond that of most world music releases. It sold more than one million copies and won a Grammy award in 1998. In 2003 it was listed by the New York-based Rolling Stone magazine as #260 in The 500 Greatest Albums of All Time.

== Musicians ==
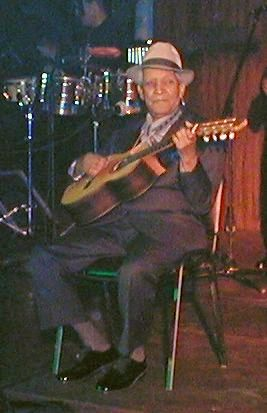
Armónico player and singer Compay Segundo, a prominent figure in the ensemble, in 2002, a year before his death at the age of 95. Born Máximo Francisco Repilado Muñoz but given the nickname Segundo (second), he was traditionally a "second voice" singer providing a baritone counterpoint harmony. On the Buena Vista Social Club recording, Segundo provides both voices on the song "¿Y tú qué has hecho?", written in the 1920s by his friend Eusebio Delfín. (sample).

A total of twenty musicians contributed to the recording including Ry Cooder's son Joachim Cooder, who at the time was a 19-year-old scholar of Latin percussion and provided drums for the band. Ry Cooder himself played slide guitar on several songs and helped produce and mix the album, afterwards describing the sessions as "the greatest musical experience of my life". Ry Cooder had been a successful American guitarist since the 1960s, recording with Captain Beefheart and the Rolling Stones. Known for his slide guitar work, his interest in roots music led him to record music from diverse genres including Tex-Mex, Hawaiian and Tuvan throat singing. He was later prosecuted and fined $25,000 by U.S. authorities for his work on the Buena Vista Social Club, having broken the Trading with the Enemy Act, a clause that forms part of the ongoing United States embargo.

Many of the Cuban musicians who featured on the album were at their musical prime in the 1940s and 1950s. After the success of the 1997 record they became known in Cuba as "Los Superabuelos" (the Super-Grandfathers). Juan de Marcos González, a Cuban folk revivalist who was younger than the bulk of performers introduced Cooder to veteran singer Ibrahim Ferrer. Ferrer (1927–2005) had been lead vocalist for bandleader Pacho Alonso, and also sang for Beny Moré, Cuba's most prominent performer in the 1940s, before his soft singing style fell out of fashion. Having found the semi-retired seventy-year-old Ferrer taking his daily stroll on the streets of Havana and shining shoes for extra money, González signed him up for the project. Cooder later described the discovery as something that happens "perhaps once in your life", and Ferrer as "the Cuban Nat King Cole". Ferrer became a prominent member of the group, and the success of the record was attributed in part to the popularity of his vocal performances. The singer went on to record a number of successful solo albums and performed with contemporary acts such as Gorillaz before his death in 2005 at the age of 78.

Virtuoso pianist Rubén González (1919–2003) also had further success releasing two solo albums after working on the initial project. González was a pianist for bandleader Arsenio Rodríguez in the 1940s, and is attributed with helping establish Cuban piano styles that were to dominate Latin music for the remainder of the century. Despite suffering from arthritis and not even owning a piano at the time of recording with Cooder, (due to an infestation of termites whilst living in South America) the American guitarist described him as "the greatest piano soloist I have ever heard". After the success of the 1997 record, González recorded and toured with bassist Orlando "Cachaíto" López, who was the only musician to play on all of the songs on the Buena Vista Social Club album. "Cachaito" (1933–2009) was the son of multi-instrumentalist Orestes López and the nephew of fellow bassist Israel "Cachao" López, the brothers often attributed with inventing the mambo. Named after his prestigious uncle, "Cachaito" (little Cachao) was a leading Descarga musician in the 1950s and 1960s, a musical form that takes its influence from modern jazz, and he became the ever-present bassist at Buena Vista Social Club performances and recordings.

One of the first to come on board the project was Compay Segundo (born Máximo Francisco Repilado Muñoz) (1907–2003), who at 89 years old was the oldest of the performers. During a discussion about politics, the veteran Segundo said: "Politics? This new guy [Fidel Castro] is good. The 1930s were rough. That's when we had the really bad times." Segundo was an accomplished guitarist and tres player who started his career playing with established bands of the 1920s and 1930s. In the 1940s, he gained fame as one half of the Los Compadres duo, and then formed Los Muchachos, a band that he led until his death in 2003. For the Buena Vista Social Club recording and performances, Segundo played a unique seven-stringed instrument, a hybrid between a guitar and a tres, which he devised himself and called an armónico. He also sang, mostly doing background vocals, in a number of songs in his baritone voice, including the self-penned opening track, Chan Chan, with Eliades Ochoa as the leading voice. Cowboy hat wearing Eliades Ochoa (b. 1946), who had collaborated previously with Segundo and was a well established traditional Cuban folk performer, played guitar and sang for the group. Omara Portuondo (b. 1930), a bolero singer and the only female in the collective, sang "Veinte Años" on the record and duets with Segundo and Ibrahim Ferrer during live performances.

Other performers included singer Pío Leyva (1917–2006) who had been working with Segundo since the early 1950s, and fellow and singer Manuel "Puntillita" Licea (1927–2000), who had performed with Celia Cruz and Benny Moré. Additional improvised percussion was provided by Amadito Valdés and Carlos González. The youngest established member of the group was Barbarito Torres, (b. 1956) a virtuoso player of the laúd, a Cuban offshoot of the lute. Trumpet was provided by Manuel "Guajiro" Mirabal (1933–2024), who went on to release solo records under the Buena Vista presents... title.

== Film ==
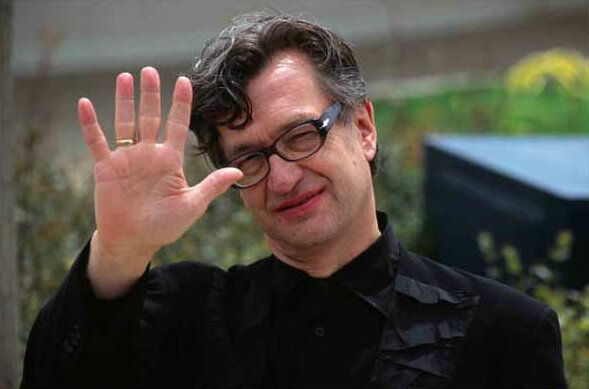
Film director Wim Wenders, who shot the documentary Buena Vista Social Club in 1999.

Shortly after returning from Havana to record the Buena Vista Social Club album, Ry Cooder began working with German film director Wim Wenders on the soundtrack to Wenders' film The End of Violence, the third such collaboration between the two artists. According to Wenders, it was an effort to force Cooder to focus on the project, "He always sort of looked in the distance and smiled, and I knew he was back in Havana." Although Wenders knew nothing about Cuban music at the time, he became enthused by tapes of the Havana sessions provided by Cooder, and agreed to travel to the island to film the recording of Buena Vista Social Club Presents: Ibrahim Ferrer, the singer's first solo album, in 1998.

Wenders filmed the recording sessions on the recently enhanced format Digital Video with the help of cinematographer Robert Müller, and then shot interviews with each "Buena Vista" ensemble member in different Havana locations. Wenders was also present to film the group's first performance with a full line-up in Amsterdam in April 1998 (two nights) and a second time in Carnegie Hall, New York City on 1 July 1998. The completed documentary was released on 17 September 1999, and included scenes in New York of the Cubans, some of whom had never left the island, window shopping and visiting tourist sites. According to Sight & Sound magazine, these scenes of "innocents abroad" were the film's most moving moments, as the contrasts between societies of Havana and New York become evident on the faces of the performers. Ferrer, from an impoverished background and staunchly anti-consumerist, was shown describing the city as "beautiful" and finding the experience overwhelming. Upon completion of filming, Wenders felt that the film "didn't feel really like it was a documentary anymore. It felt like it was a true character piece".

The film became a box office success, grossing $23,002,182 worldwide. Critics were generally enthusiastic about the story and especially the music, although leading U.S. film critic Roger Ebert and the British Film Institute's Peter Curran felt that Wenders had lingered too long on Cooder during the performances; and the editing, which interspersed interviews with music, had disrupted the continuity of the songs. The film was nominated for an Academy Award for best documentary feature in 1999. It won best documentary at the European Film Awards and received seventeen other major accolades internationally.

== Live performances ==
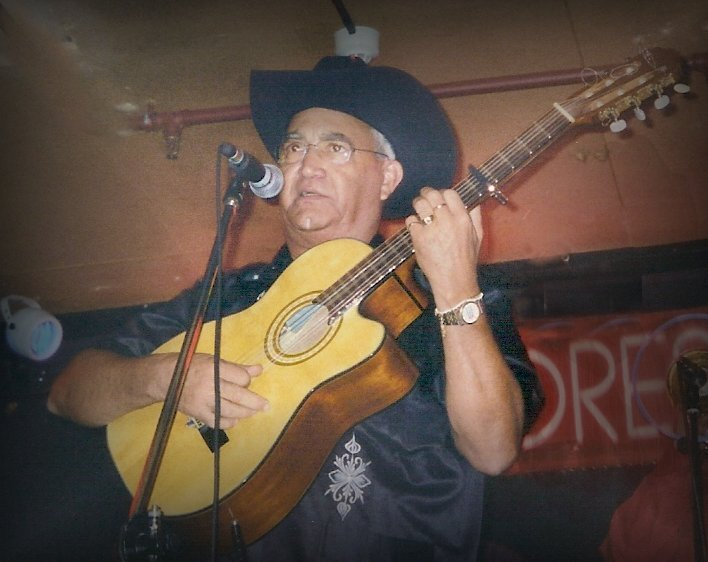
Guitarist Eliades Ochoa who sang "El Carretero" on the record. In the film, Ochoa is shown playing the song whilst walking alongside a deserted railtrack.

The first performances by the full line up of Buena Vista Social Club, including Cooder, were those filmed by Wenders in Amsterdam and New York. Other international shows and television appearances soon followed with varying line ups. Ibrahim Ferrer and Rubén González performed together in Los Angeles in 1998 to an audience that included Alanis Morissette, Sean Combs, and Jennifer Lopez, Ferrer dedicating the song Mami Me Gusto to the Hispanic Lopez.

Performances in Florida, which has a large Cuban exile and Cuban American community, were rare after the release of the film due to the political climate. In the late 1990s, a concert by Cuban jazz pianist Gonzalo Rubalcaba turned into a near riot when concert goers were attacked and spat at by protesters opposed to the Cuban government. When "Buena Vista" musicians played for a music industry conference at Miami Beach in 1998, hundreds of protesters chanted outside and the convention center hall was cleared briefly because of a bomb threat. In 1999, Ferrer and Ruben González were forced to cancel Miami shows citing fears for their safety after fellow-Cubans Los Van Van drew 4,000 protesters at a previous show, and Compay Segundo was forced to cut short a 1999 Miami performance due to another bomb threat. When touring the U.S., the Cubans are only entitled to their per diem (transportation and lodging) and are not permitted performance fees due to the U.S. embargo. In 2001 a Buena Vista Social Club (with Ibrahim Ferrer) performance was recorded in Austin for PBS and broadcast on Austin City Limits in 2002.

Musicians associated with Buena Vista Social Club have toured throughout the world as Orquesta Buena Vista Social Club, and despite the deaths of six of the original members, the collective performed with many of the remaining ensemble members including Barbarito Torres and "Guajiro" Mirabal. Ry Cooder's guitar parts were handled by Manuel Galbán, a former member of Cuban vocal group Los Zafiros, who played on Ibrahim Ferrer's first solo record with Cooder and appeared in Wim Wenders' film. Following a 2007 performance in London, a reviewer at The Independent described the ensemble as "something of an anomaly in music business terms, due to their changing line-up and the fact that they've never really had one defining front person", adding, "It's hard to know what to expect from what is more of a brand than a band."

== Cultural impact ==
Compay Segundo saying goodbye to the audience at the Hotel Nacional de Cuba, Havana. October 2002

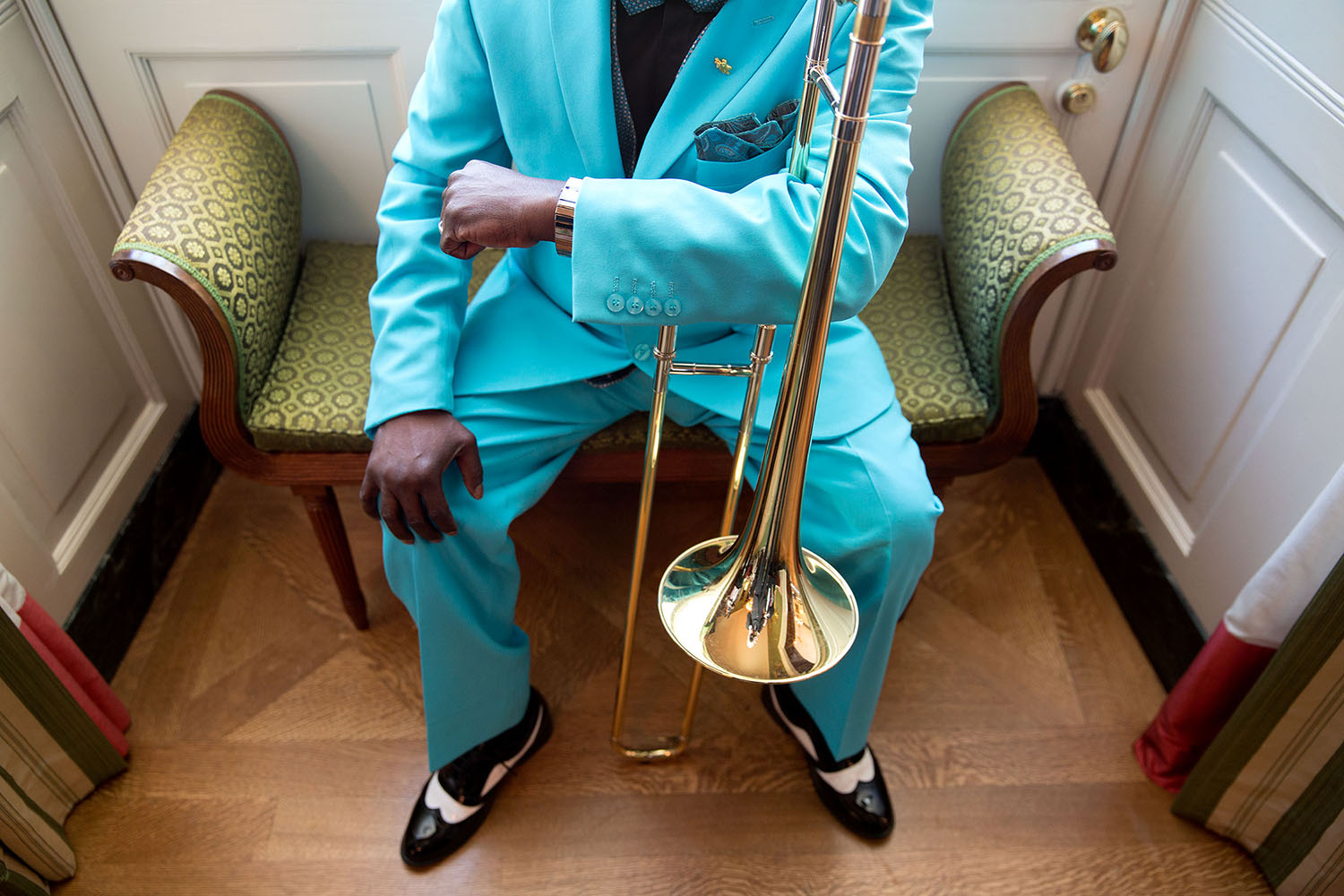
Jesús "Aguaje" Ramos and his trombone at the White House, where Orquesta Buena Vista Social Club were received in 2015.

The international success of the Buena Vista Social Club generated a revival of interest in traditional Cuban music and Latin American music as a whole. Musical director Juan de Marcos felt that the recordings serve "as a symbol of the power of Cuban music, and which to a certain degree have contributed to Cuban music regaining the status it always had in Latin American and world music."

Cuba's burgeoning tourist industry of the late 1990s benefited from this rebirth of interest. According to The Economist, "In the tourist quarters of Old Havana it can seem at times as if every Cuban with a guitar has come out to sing the songs that Buena Vista made famous. It's as if you were to go to Liverpool and find bands singing Beatles songs on every street corner." The songs Buena Vista sings are often not their own compositions. Some songs they sing have long been popular in Cuba and people have always performed them in the street. Despite the appeal of the "Buena Vista" ambience to tourists, Cubans themselves were less aware of the "Buena Vista Social Club" than international music listeners. This was due to the foreign nature of the production, and the dominance of modern Timba, Songo and other musical forms on the island. Some explain that Buena Vista did not impact the Cuban audience, as they were not creating anything new; they were just playing the same songs that Cubans know and have been playing for many years.

Mari Marques, a Cuban American who leads cultural tours to Cuba, contests that the preponderance of traditional musicians was not solely a consequence of the "Buena Vista Social Club". Marques believes the notion that some music had been completely neglected in Cuba is "a romantic exaggeration that was propagated by U.S. media coverage", and the reality is that son trios have existed "everywhere in cities such as Santiago de Cuba in the east of the island." British world music record label Tumi Music, who had worked with de Marcos and many of the ensemble musicians prior to Cooder, asserted that Cuba has more than 50,000 musicians, all as good as, and some as old as the "Buena Vista" participants, "but these people hardly ever have the opportunity to share their talents with the outside world." The label lamented that, "for the West to pay any real attention and consume the product, you needed someone like Ry Cooder to give it a stamp of approval first."

British Socialist Workers Party member and Marxist writer Mike Gonzalez believes the ensemble provoked a backward glance to "timeless, sensual places where dreams and desire merged in a comfortable, evocative music". Gonzalez asserts that the aura evoked did not represent "the real Cuba" before the revolution of 1959, nor Cuba in the modern era, but that the Cuban government were happy for the tourist industry to "enjoy the fruits of this confusion". The American Historical Review suggested that the Buena Vista Social Club's mise en scène fueled nostalgic, idealistic feelings not only of many Americans and Cubans in the United States who remember the Havana of the 1950s, but also of Cubans in Cuba. The result was a reminiscence about the pre-revolutionary era—dominated by the politics of Gerardo Machado in the 1920s–30s and then General Fulgencio Batista until 1959—which "no longer seems so bad".

A stage musical adaptation with the same name as the album and focusing on the history and performers of the group was staged Off-Broadway in 2023. The musical moved to Broadway in 2025, garnering ten Tony Award nominations and winning four.

== Discography ==
=== Buena Vista Social Club albums ===
- Buena Vista Social Club (World Circuit/Nonesuch Records,16 September 1997)
- Buena Vista Social Club at Carnegie Hall (World Circuit/Nonesuch Records, 14 October 2008) (live album)
- Lost and Found (World Circuit/Nonesuch Records, 23 March 2015) (collection of previously unreleased tracks)

=== Other releases ===
==== Solo albums ====
The below discography includes solo albums released since the first Buena Vista Social Club album that feature the musicians in the ensemble, and that are considered to be under the "Buena Vista Social Club" aegis.

- Rubén González
  - Introducing... Rubén González (World Circuit/Nonesuch Records, 17 September 1997) – with Orlando "Cachaito" Lopez, Manuel "El Guajiro" Mirabal, Ry Cooder and Manuel Galbán
  - Chanchullo (World Circuit/Nonesuch Records, 17 September 2000) – with Ibrahim Ferrer, Eliades Ochoa, Cheikh Lô, Amadito Valdés and Joachim Cooder
- Barbarito Torres
  - Havana Cafe (Atlantic Records, 6 April 1999) – with Manuel "El Guajiro" Mirabal, Ibrahim Ferrer, Pío Leyva and Omara Portuondo
- Ibrahim Ferrer
  - Buena Vista Social Club Presents Ibrahim Ferrer (World Circuit/Nonesuch Records, 8 June 1999) – with Rubén González, Orlando "Cachaito" Lopez, Ry Cooder, Manuel Galbán
  - Buenos Hermanos (World Circuit/Nonesuch Records, 18 March 2003) – with Orlando "Cachaito" Lopez, Ry Cooder and Manuel Galbán
  - Mi Sueño (World Circuit/Nonesuch Records, 26 March 2007) – with Orlando "Cachaíto" López, Manuel Galbán, Rubén González, Manuel "Guajiro" Mirabal, Omara Portuondo, Amadito Valdés
- Eliades Ochoa
  - Sublime Illusion (Higher Octave, 29 June 1999) – with Ry Cooder
- Omara Portuondo
  - Buena Vista Social Club Presents: Omara Portuondo (World Circuit/Nonesuch Records, 25 April 2000) – with Pío Leyva, Rubén González, Orlando "Cachaito" Lopez, Eliades Ochoa, Compay Segundo and Amadito Valdés
  - Flor de Amor (World Circuit/Nonesuch Records, 25 May 2004) – with Barbarito Torres, Orlando "Cachaito" Lopez and Manuel Galbán
- Orlando "Cachaíto" López
  - Cachaito (World Circuit/Nonesuch Records, 22 May 2001) – with Juan de Marcos González, Amadito Valdés and Ibrahim Ferrer
- Amadito Valdés
  - Bajando Gervasio (Primienta Records, 10 December 2002) – with Barbarito Torres
- Manuel "Guajiro" Mirabal
  - Buena Vista Social Club Presents: Manuel "Guajiro" Mirabal (World Circuit/Nonesuch Records, 4 January 2005) – with Ibrahim Ferrer, Pío Leyva, Orlando "Cachaito" Lopez, Omara Portuondo, Juan de Marcos González and Manuel Galbán

==== Various artists ====
- Rhythms del Mundo: Cuba (Universal Music, 14 November 2006) – with Ibrahim Ferrer, Orlando "Cachaito" Lopez, Barbarito Torres, Amadito Valdés, Omara Portuondo performing alongside Coldplay, Arctic Monkeys, Dido, Quincy Jones, Kaiser Chiefs, Radiohead, U2 and Jack Johnson

== See also ==
- Afro-Cuban All Stars, parallel project
- AfroCubism, successful collaboration with African musicians
