= Buena Vista Social Club (album) =

1997 studio album by ensemble of Cuban musicians

Studio album by Buena Vista Social Club
- Released: June 23, 1997
- Recorded: March 1996
- Studio: EGREM (Havana)
- Genres: Son cubano; bolero; descarga; danzón; guajira; criolla; jazz
- Length: 60:12
- Labels: World Circuit; Nonesuch
- Producer: Ry Cooder

Buena Vista Social Club chronology
| Buena Vista Social Club (1997) | At Carnegie Hall (2008) |

Buena Vista Social Club is the only studio album by Cuban musical ensemble Buena Vista Social Club, directed by Juan de Marcos González and American guitarist Ry Cooder. Produced by Cooder, it was recorded at Havana's EGREM studios in March 1996 and released on June 23, 1997, through World Circuit internationally. Release in the United States followed on September 16 by Nonesuch Records. It is the only standard studio album exclusively credited to the Buena Vista Social Club.

Buena Vista Social Club was recorded in parallel with A toda Cuba le gusta by the Afro-Cuban All Stars, a similar project also promoted by World Circuit executive Nick Gold and featuring largely the same lineup. In contrast to A toda Cuba le gusta, which was conceived as a revival of the son conjunto, Buena Vista Social Club was meant to bring back the traditional trova and filin, a mellower take on the Cuban son and bolero, as well as the danzón.

The album was a critical and commercial success and is one of the best-selling Latin albums of all time. Its release was followed by a short concert tour in Amsterdam and New York's Carnegie Hall in 1998. Footage from these dates, as well as from the recording sessions in Havana, was shown in the 1999 documentary Buena Vista Social Club directed by Wim Wenders. In 2022, the album was selected for preservation in the United States National Recording Registry by the Library of Congress as being "culturally historically or aesthetically significant". In the same year it was recognized by the Guinness World Records as the best-selling world music album.

== Background ==
In 1996, American guitarist Ry Cooder was invited to Havana by British world music producer Nick Gold of World Circuit Records to record a session in which two African highlife musicians from Mali were to collaborate with Cuban musicians. When Cooder arrived (via Mexico to avoid the ongoing U.S. trade and travel embargo against Cuba), it was found that the musicians from Africa had not received their visas and were unable to come. Cooder and Gold changed their plans and decided to record an album of Cuban son music with local musicians instead. Cuban musicians already involved in the African collaboration project included bassist Orlando "Cachaito" López, guitarist Eliades Ochoa and musical director Juan de Marcos González, who had himself been organizing a similar project for the Afro-Cuban All Stars. A search for additional musicians led the team to singer Manuel "Puntillita" Licea, pianist Rubén González, trumpeter Manuel "Guajiro" Mirabal and octogenarian singer Compay Segundo, who all agreed to record for the project.

Cooder, Gold and de Marcos organized a large group of performers (twenty are credited) and arranged recording sessions at Havana's EGREM Studios, formerly owned by RCA records, where the equipment and atmosphere had remained unchanged since the 1950s. Communication between the Spanish and English speakers at the studio was conducted via an interpreter, although Cooder reflected that "musicians understand each other through means other than speaking".

== Recording ==
The album contained fourteen tracks and was recorded in six days. It opened with "Chan Chan" written by Compay Segundo, a four-chord son (Dm, F, Gm, A7) that was to become what Cooder described as "the Buena Vista's calling card"; and ending with a rendition of "La bayamesa", a traditional Cuban patriotic song (not to be confused with the Cuban national anthem of the same name). The sessions also produced material for the subsequent release Introducing...Rubén González which showcased the work of the Cuban pianist. Among the songs left off the album were the classic bolero-son "Lágrimas negras", which was deemed too popular for inclusion, and Compay Segundo's "Macusa". Both songs were later released on the compilation Lost and Found.

=== Songs ===
"Chan Chan"
According to Ry Cooder, the song became the group's "calling card".

"Buena Vista Social Club"
The song features the piano playing of Rubén González, and was the Havana club's "mascot tune" in the 1940s.

The majority of the album comprised standards of the trova and filin repertoire, namely sones, guajiras and boleros typically played by small guitar-led ensembles. A foremost example of the son tradition on the album was "Chan Chan", the group's signature tune and the album opener. Written in the 1980s, it was one of Compay Segundo's most famous songs and one he had recorded several times, most notably with Eliades Ochoa and his Cuarteto Patria. The same formula was followed in this recording, with Ochoa singing lead and Segundo on second voice (as his artist name indicated). The song's lyrics depicted a rural scene with two characters, Juanita and Chan Chan. "Chan Chan" was followed by "De camino a la vereda", another son, written and sung by Ibrahim Ferrer.

Another example of the son cubano was Sergio González Siaba's "El cuarto de Tula", sung by Eliades Ochoa, with Ferrer and Manuel "Puntillita" Licea joining Ochoa in an extended descarga (jam) section improvising lyrics. Barbarito Torres played a frenetic laúd solo towards the end of the track. Timbales were played by 13-year-old Yulién Oviedo Sánchez. The song was featured in the 2001 film Training Day. "Candela" was another classic son, composed by Faustino Oramas "El Guayabero". Its lyrics, rich with sexual innuendo, were sung by Ibrahim Ferrer, who improvised vocal lines throughout the track, and the whole ensemble performed an extended descarga.

Of the many boleros featured in the album, Isolina Carrillo's "Dos gardenias" was perhaps the most famous, sung here by Ibrahim Ferrer. Carrillo wrote the song in 1945 and it became a huge success in Cuba and abroad. The song was chosen for the album after Cooder heard Ferrer and Rubén González improvising the melody before a recording session. Ferrer had learned the song while playing with Cuban bandleader Beny Moré. Another bolero, "¿Y tú qué has hecho?" was written by Eusebio Delfín in the 1920s and featured Compay Segundo on tres and vocals. Segundo was traditionally a "second voice" singer providing a baritone counterpoint harmony. On this recording he multitracked both voices. The song also featured a duet between Segundo on tres and Ry Cooder on guitar. "Veinte años", also a bolero, was sung by the only female vocalist in the ensemble, Omara Portuondo, with Segundo on second vocals. It was recorded in one take after Omara had finished her own recording sessions at EGREM studios and was preparing to fly to Vietnam. Other boleros included were Rafael Ortiz's "Amor de loca juventud", Eliseo Silveira's "Orgullecida" (both sung by Compay Segundo) and Electo Rosell's "Murmullo" (sung by Ibrahim Ferrer, who used to be the lead vocalist in Rosell's ensemble Orquesta Chepín-Chovén).

"El carretero", a guajira (country lament), was sung by Eliades Ochoa with the full ensemble providing additional instruments and backing vocals. "La bayamesa", a famous criolla by Sindo Garay, was the album closer with Puntillita, Compay Segundo and Ibrahim Ferrer on vocals.

Two tracks were included from the Cuban danzón repertoire, "Pueblo Nuevo" and "Buena Vista Social Club", both dedicated to locations in Havana. They were originally recorded by Arcaño y sus Maravillas and were composed by bass player Cachao (although "Buena Vista Social Club" has been wrongly attributed to his brother Orestes López in the liner notes and by Cooder). The title track, highlighting the piano work of Rubén González, was recorded after Cooder heard González improvising around the tune's musical theme before a day's recording session. After playing the tune, González explained to Cooder the history of the social club and that the song was the club's "mascot tune". When searching for a name for the overall project, manager Nick Gold chose the song's title. According to Cooder,

It should be the thing that sets it apart. It was a kind of club by then. Everybody was hanging out and we had rum and coffee around two in the afternoon. It felt like a club, so let's call it that. That's what gave it a handle.

== Reception ==
Professional ratings
Review scores
| Source | Rating |
|---|---|
| AllMusic | 5/5 stars |
| Encyclopedia of Popular Music | 5/5 stars |
| Entertainment Weekly | B+ |
| Record Collector | 4/5 stars |
| Rolling Stone | 4/5 stars |
| Uncut | 5/5 stars |
| Vibe | (favorable) |

Buena Vista Social Club earned widespread critical acclaim from music writers and publications. In 2003, the album was ranked number 260 on Rolling Stone magazine's list of the 500 greatest albums of all time, one of only two albums on the list to be produced in a non-English speaking country. The album was also included in the book 1001 Albums You Must Hear Before You Die.

The album was awarded the 1998 Grammy Award for Best Traditional Tropical Latin Album and Tropical/Salsa Album of the Year by a Group at the 1998 Billboard Latin Music Awards.

In 2022, the album was selected by the Library of Congress for preservation in the National Recording Registry.

In 2024, it was ranked in eleventh position on the “Los 600 de Latinoamérica” list compiled by a collective of music journalists from several countries of the Americas, curating the top 600 Latin American albums from 1920 to 2022.

== Track listing ==
Buena Vista Social Club track listing
| No. | Title | Writer(s) | Length |
|---|---|---|---|
| 1. | "Chan Chan" | Compay Segundo | 4:16 |
| 2. | "De camino a la vereda" | Ibrahim Ferrer | 5:03 |
| 3. | "El cuarto de Tula" | Sergio González Siaba | 7:27 |
| 4. | "Pueblo Nuevo" | Israel "Cachao" López | 6:05 |
| 5. | "Dos gardenias" | Isolina Carrillo | 3:02 |
| 6. | "¿Y tú qué has hecho?" | Eusebio Delfín | 3:13 |
| 7. | "Veinte años" | María Teresa Vera | 3:29 |
| 8. | "El carretero" | Guillermo Portabales | 3:28 |
| 9. | "Candela" | Faustino Oramas | 5:27 |
| 10. | "Amor de loca juventud" | Rafael Ortiz | 3:21 |
| 11. | "Orgullecida" | Eliseo Silveira | 3:18 |
| 12. | "Murmullo" | Electo "Chepín" Rosell | 3:50 |
| 13. | "Buena Vista Social Club" | Israel "Cachao" López | 4:50 |
| 14. | "La bayamesa" | Sindo Garay | 2:54 |

== Musicians ==
- Eliades Ochoa – vocals (1, 3, 8, 9), guitar (1, 3, 8, 9, 11)
- Compay Segundo – backing vocals (1), congas (1), guitar (2, 6, 7, 10, 11, 14), vocals (6, 7, 10, 11, 14)
- Ibrahim Ferrer – backing vocals (1, 8), vocals (2, 3, 5, 9, 12, 14), conga (4), clave (6, 13), bongos (10)
- Ry Cooder – guitars (1–7, 11–13), mbira (2, 8), laúd (8), bolon (8), floor slide (8), percussion (8), acoustic slide guitar (9), electric slide guitar (9), slide guitar (10)
- Manuel "Guajiro" Mirabal – trumpet (1–6, 9, 11)
- Orlando "Cachaito" López – upright bass (1–9, 11–14)
- Carlos González – bongos (1, 3, 9), cowbell (3, 9)
- Alberto "Virgilio" Valdés – maracas (1–9, 12, 13), backing vocals (2), chorus vocals (3, 9)
- Joachim Cooder – udu drum (1, 4, 5, 8, 12, 13), dumbek (2, 3, 6, 7, 9–11), conga (3), drums (11)
- Barbarito Torres – laúd (2, 3, 11)
- Manuel Licea – backing vocals (2), vocals (3, 14), chorus vocals (9), congas (13)
- Juan de Marcos González – backing vocals (2, 8), conductor (3, 9), güiro (8), chorus vocals (9)
- Luis Barzaga – backing vocals (2), chorus vocals (3, 9)
- Julienne Oviedo Sánchez – timbales (3)
- Rubén González – piano (4, 5, 6, 11–14)
- Lázaro Villa – güiro (4, 13), congas (5, 12)
- Omara Portuondo – vocals (7)
- Julio Alberto Fernández – vocals (10), maracas (10)
- Benito Suárez Magana – guitar (10)
- Salvador Repilado Labrada – bass (10)

== Chart performance ==
As of 2020, the album had sold over eight million copies. and is considered one of the best-selling Latin albums of all time worldwide.

Buena Vista Social Club achieved considerable sales in Europe, reaching the Top 10 in several countries, including Germany where it topped the charts, as well as the US, where it reached number 80 on the Billboard 200. In 2009, it was awarded a double platinum certification from the Independent Music Companies Association which indicated sales of at least 1,000,000 copies throughout Europe. As of October 2017, it is the second bestselling Latin album in the United States after Dreaming of You (1995) by Selena.

=== Weekly charts ===
1997–2000 weekly chart performance for Buena Vista Social Club
| Chart (1997–2000) | Peak position |
|---|---|
| Australian Albums (ARIA) | 6 |
| Austrian Albums (Ö3 Austria) | 37 |
| Belgian Albums (Ultratop Flanders) | 18 |
| Belgian Albums (Ultratop Wallonia) | 29 |
| Dutch Albums (Album Top 100) | 7 |
| Finnish Albums (Suomen virallinen lista) | 2 |
| French Albums (SNEP) | 8 |
| German Albums (Offizielle Top 100) | 1 |
| Irish Albums (IRMA) | 27 |
| Italian Albums (FIMI) | 26 |
| Norwegian Albums (VG-lista) | 14 |
| Swedish Albums (Sverigetopplistan) | 26 |
| Swiss Albums (Schweizer Hitparade) | 7 |
| UK Albums (Official Charts) | 44 |
| US Billboard 200 | 80 |
| US Top Latin Albums (Billboard) | 1 |
| US Tropical Albums (Billboard) | 1 |
| US World Albums (Billboard) | 1 |

2020–2021 weekly chart performance for Buena Vista Social Club
| Chart (2020–2021) | Peak position |
|---|---|
| Austrian Albums (Ö3 Austria) | 10 |
| Belgian Albums (Ultratop Flanders) | 11 |
| Belgian Albums (Ultratop Wallonia) | 16 |
| Portuguese Albums (AFP) | 4 |
| Scottish Albums (Official Charts) | 14 |
| Spanish Albums (Promusicae) | 24 |

2026 weekly chart performance for Buena Vista Social Club
| Chart (2026) | Peak position |
|---|---|
| Greek Albums (IFPI) | 79 |

=== Year-end charts ===
Year-end chart performance for Buena Vista Social Club
| Chart | Year | Position |
|---|---|---|
| Dutch Albums (Album Top 100) | 1997 | 53 |
| Dutch Albums (Album Top 100) | 1998 | 16 |
| Austrian Albums (Ö3 Austria) | 1999 | 27 |
| Dutch Albums (Album Top 100) | 1999 | 42 |
| French Albums (SNEP) | 1999 | 18 |
| German Albums (Offizielle Top 100) | 1999 | 4 |
| Australian Albums (ARIA) | 2000 | 59 |
| Canadian Albums (Nielsen SoundScan) | 2000 | 107 |
| Dutch Albums (Album Top 100) | 2000 | 69 |
| European Albums (Music & Media) | 2000 | 32 |
| French Albums (SNEP) | 2000 | 33 |
| German Albums (Offizielle Top 100) | 2000 | 11 |
| Swiss Albums (Schweizer Hitparade) | 2000 | 30 |
| French Albums (SNEP) | 2001 | 84 |
| German Albums (Offizielle Top 100) | 2001 | 84 |
| Belgian Albums (Ultratop Flanders) | 2015 | 126 |
| Belgian Albums (Ultratop Flanders) | 2016 | 102 |
| Belgian Albums (Ultratop Flanders) | 2017 | 129 |
| Belgian Albums (Ultratop Flanders) | 2018 | 82 |
| Belgian Albums (Ultratop Flanders) | 2019 | 134 |
| Belgian Albums (Ultratop Flanders) | 2020 | 156 |
| Belgian Albums (Ultratop Flanders) | 2021 | 83 |
| US Top Latin Albums (Billboard) | 2021 | 100 |
| Belgian Albums (Ultratop Flanders) | 2022 | 58 |
| Belgian Albums (Ultratop Flanders) | 2023 | 125 |
| Belgian Albums (Ultratop Flanders) | 2024 | 164 |
| Belgian Albums (Ultratop Flanders) | 2025 | 186 |

== Stage musical adaptation ==
A stage musical adaptation of the album and focusing on the history and performers of the group was staged Off-Broadway in 2023.

== Certifications and sales ==
Certifications and sales for Buena Vista Social Club
| Region | Certification | Certified units/sales |
|---|---|---|
| Argentina (CAPIF) | Platinum | 60,000^{^} |
| Australia (ARIA) | Platinum | 70,000^{^} |
| Austria (IFPI Austria) | 2× Platinum | 100,000^{*} |
| Belgium (BRMA) | 3× Platinum | 150,000^{*} |
| Brazil (Pro-Música Brasil) | Gold | 100,000^{*} |
| Canada (Music Canada) | Platinum | 100,000^{^} |
| Denmark (IFPI Danmark) | 3× Platinum | 60,000^{‡} |
| France (SNEP) | Gold | 100,000^{*} |
| Germany (BVMI) | 3× Gold | 750,000^{^} |
| Japan (RIAJ) | Gold | 100,000^{^} |
| Netherlands (NVPI) | 2× Platinum | 200,000^{^} |
| Norway (IFPI Norway) | Gold | 25,000^{*} |
| Sweden (GLF) | Gold | 40,000^{^} |
| Switzerland (IFPI Switzerland) | 3× Platinum | 150,000^{^} |
| United Kingdom (BPI) video | 3× Platinum | 150,000^{^} |
| United Kingdom (BPI) | Platinum | 528,398 |
| United States (RIAA) | Platinum | 1,925,000 |
Summaries
| Europe (IFPI) | 3× Platinum | 3,000,000^{*} |
| Worldwide | — | 8,000,000 |
^{*} Sales figures based on certification alone.^{^} Shipments figures based on certification alone.^{‡} Sales+streaming figures based on certification alone.

== See also ==
- 1997 in Latin music
- List of number-one Billboard Top Latin Albums from the 1990s
- List of number-one Billboard Tropical Albums from the 1990s
- List of best-selling Latin albums
- List of best-selling Latin albums in the United States
