= Buena Vista Social Club at Carnegie Hall =

Live album by Buena Vista Social Club
- Released: October 13, 2008
- Recorded: July 1, 1998
- Genres: Son cubano; bolero; descarga; danzón; guajira; criolla
- Length: 77:01
- Labels: World Circuit; Nonesuch
- Producer: Ry Cooder

Buena Vista Social Club chronology
Buena Vista Social Club (1997)	Buena Vista Social Club at Carnegie Hall (2008)	Lost and Found (2015)

Professional ratings
Review scores
Source	Rating
AllMusic	5/5 stars

Buena Vista Social Club at Carnegie Hall is a live album by Buena Vista Social Club. The double album documents the band's complete performance at Carnegie Hall, New York City, on July 1, 1998. The album was produced by guitarist Ry Cooder and released ten years after its recording, on October 13, 2008, through World Circuit.

The performance featured veteran Cuban performers such as Ibrahim Ferrer, Ruben González, Compay Segundo, and Omara Portuondo. Parts of the concert were featured in Wim Wenders' Oscar-nominated documentary, also called Buena Vista Social Club.

In 2009, it was awarded a gold certification from the Independent Music Companies Association which indicated sales of at least 100,000 copies throughout Europe. As of March 2015 it has sold 47,000 copies in United States.

== Track listing ==
Disc one

1. "Chan Chan" – 4:45
2. "De camino a la vereda" – 4:58
3. "El cuarto de Tula" – 8:00
4. "La engañadora" – 2:44
5. "Buena Vista Social Club" – 5:59
6. "Dos gardenias" – 4:23
7. "Quizás, quizás, quizás" – 3:47
8. "Veinte años" – 4:06

Disc two

1. "Orgullecida" – 3:23
2. "¿Y tú qué has hecho?" – 3:33
3. "Siboney" – 2:32
4. "Mandinga" – 5:29
5. "Almendra" – 5:49
6. "El carretero" – 5:38
7. "Candela" – 7:00
8. "Silencio" – 4:55

== Charts ==
Weekly chart performance for Buena Vista Social Club at Carnegie Hall
Chart (2008)	Peak position
Austrian Albums (Ö3 Austria)	49
Belgian Albums (Ultratop Flanders)	17
Belgian Albums (Ultratop Wallonia)	39
Dutch Albums (Album Top 100)	35
French Albums (SNEP)	44
German Albums (Offizielle Top 100)	49
Irish Albums (IRMA)	47
Italian Albums (FIMI)	77
Mexican Albums (Top 100 Mexico)	57
Swiss Albums (Schweizer Hitparade)	37
UK Albums (Official Charts)	55
US Billboard 200	200
US Top Latin Albums (Billboard)	10

== See also ==
- List of number-one Billboard Tropical Albums from the 2000s
