= Silencio (Rafael Hernández song) =

Song composed by Rafael Hernández Marín

Song
- Language: Spanish
- English title: "Silence"
- Genre: Bolero
- Songwriter(s): Rafael Hernández

"Silencio" (Spanish for "silence") is a bolero written in 1932 by Puerto Rican musician and composer Rafael Hernández. It has become a standard of the Latin music repertoire, with notable performances by artists such as Cuarteto Machín, Daniel Santos, Noro Morales and Ibrahim Ferrer.

This bolero should not be confused with the omelenkó of the same name composed by Elsa Angulo Macías and recorded by Celia Cruz with La Sonora Matancera in 1953.

== Recordings ==
=== Buena Vista Social Club ===
Recorded by various artists in the world of Hispanic music, it came to wider prominence when it was included in the Oscar-nominated soundtrack of the 1999 documentary film Buena Vista Social Club, set in Cuba and directed by Wim Wenders. The song was sung by well-known singers Ibrahim Ferrer and Omara Portuondo, and conducted by Juan de Marcos González, featuring Ry Cooder on guitar. The scene from the film in which the song is performed is particularly poignant because the age of the performers (72 and 69, respectively; the oldest bandmember was 91 and several others were over 80 years old) is contrasted by the freshness and emotional intensity of the performance, in which she is moved to tears that he tenderly brushes away.

The song was not included in the Buena Vista Social Club eponymous album, but rather in Ferrer's Buena Vista Social Club Presents Ibrahim Ferrer, released in 1999 by World Circuit.

=== Other versions ===
At the height of his career (the late 1950s until his death in 1964), the Puerto Rican pianist and bandleader Noro Morales released a series of recordings of ballroom rumba pieces arranged for his sextet, without vocals and with (an innovation) the piano playing both melody and rhythm. Several of his successes were composed by Hernández, among them "Silencio".

The 1969 Mexican film "El jibarito Rafael", set in Puerto Rico, has a scene where a tuxedo-clad singer (Felipe Pirela) sings the song as he wanders around the nightclub where the protagonist couple is sitting, to end up facing the girl directly as he begins the phrase "Silencio ..."

The Italian Singer Fabio Lepore made his version on the album "Pausa Caffe'"

== Lyrics ==
The first two lines of the song, "Duermen en mi jardín / Las blancas azucenas", translates as Sleeping in my garden / The white lilies. The order of these lines is reversed in some versions. The third line, Los nardos y las rosas or The tuberoses and the roses, is omitted entirely from some versions.

Further lines of the song talk about a tormented soul: And my soul, very sad and heavy, Wants to hide from the flowers, Its bitter pain. The singer hides their true feelings: I don't want the flowers to know, The torments' life sends me, If they knew what I suffer. With my pains, they too would cry. The point is reiterated: Silence; let them sleep, The nards and the lilies. I don't want them to know my sadness. The final line, repeated three times, translates as Because, if they see me crying, they’ll die.

All the flowers mentioned are heavily scented, and hence have a palpable and evocative presence, even at night, in the dark, when they are "sleeping". This attribute leads to the conceit that the flowers are as sensitive to human emotions, just as humans are to their scents.
