= Pedro Depestre =

Cuban violinist, arranger and musical director

- Birth name: Pedro Celestino Depestre González
- Born: June 1945 Cienfuegos, Cuba
- Died: 8 April 2001 (aged 55) Basel, Switzerland
- Genres: Chachachá, danzón, songo, descarga
- Occupation(s): Musician, musical director, arranger
- Instrument: Violin
- Years active: 1948–2001
- Labels: EGREM, World Circuit, Latin World
- Formerly of: Orquesta Aragón, Orquesta Maravillas de Florida, Orquesta Típica Juventud, Estrellas de Areito, Buena Vista Social Club

Pedro Celestino Depestre González (June 1945 – 8 April 2001) was a Cuban violinist, arranger and musical director. He was one of Cuba's most prolific charanga violinists, playing with Orquesta Aragón, Orquesta Maravillas de Florida, Orquesta Típica Juventud and Estrellas de Areito, among others. In the late 1990s, he recorded with the Buena Vista Social Club ensemble and toured with Orlando "Cachaíto" López in 2001, but died on stage during the first concert of the tour.

== Life and career ==
He joined Orquesta Aragón in 1958, at age thirteen, replacing his father, Filiberto Depestre Méndez. In 1963, he became director of Orquesta Maravillas de Florida, another charanga similar to the Aragón, again replacing his father. He later directed the Orquesta Típica Juventud, based in Santiago de Cuba, for many years, releasing several albums.

Depestre also worked for Orquesta ICRT and EGREM, Cuba's national record label. In 1979, he took part in the Estrellas de Areito recordings, improvised jam sessions featuring the most prominent musicians residing in Cuba at the time. He was later first violinist and music director of the Tropicana Club orchestra.

In the late 1990s, Depestre played in several studio recordings by the Buena Vista Social Club project, which were released on albums by Ibrahim Ferrer and Omara Portuondo. He did not tour with the band until 2001, when he joined bassist Orlando "Cachaíto" López for his European tour. On the first show of the tour, in Basel, Switzerland, Depestre died on stage after playing a solo. He was 55 years old.

== Discography ==
As leader

- 1999: Son charangas y pasiones (Latin World)

With Orquesta Típica Juventud

- 1975: XI Festival Mundial de la Juventud y los Estudiantes, Habana, Cuba, 1978 (Areito)
- 1983: Mi orquesta sigue igual (Siboney)
- 1985: Se va pegando (Siboney)
- 1996: Lo mismo bailo un son (live, recorded 1972)

As sideman

- 1980: Estrellas de Areito – Vol. 3 (EGREM)
- 1999: Ibrahim Ferrer – Buena Vista Social Club Presents Ibrahim Ferrer (World Circuit)
- 2000: Omara Portuondo – Buena Vista Social Club Presents Omara Portuondo (World Circuit)
- 2001: Orlando "Cachaíto" López – Cachaíto (World Circuit)
- 2015: Buena Vista Social Club – Lost and Found (World Circuit, recorded 1996–2004)
