= Amadito Valdés =

Cuban percussionist

- Also known as: Amadito Valdés Jr.
- Born: Amado Valdés; February 14, 1946 (age 80); Havana, Cuba
- Genres: Afro-Cuban jazz, son cubano, Cuban charanga, salsa
- Occupation: Musician
- Instruments: Timbales, drum kit
- Label: EGREM
- Formerly of: Cuarteto d'Aida; Buena Vista Social Club; Afro-Cuban All Stars
- Website: http://amaditovaldes.com/

Amadito Valdés (born February 14, 1946) is a Cuban timbalero, best known for his work with Cuarteto Las d'Aida and Buena Vista Social Club.

== Career ==
Valdés was born in Havana in 1946. Early on, he studied music with his father, Amadito Valdés Sr., who was a well-known Cuban jazz saxophonist, and in 1961 he took up drumming under the supervision of Walfredo de los Reyes. When Reyes left Cuba, Valdés joined Havana's "Alejandro García Caturla" Conservatory and it was there that he began to develop his improvisational style on the timbales, mixing Afro rhythms in 6/8 time with the Cuban son syncopated rhythms in 2/4 time.

In the 1960s, Valdés became the timbalero for the popular Cuban vocal quartet Las d'Aida.

In 1996, Valdés joined American guitarist Ry Cooder for the Buena Vista Social Club collaboration, playing timbales on both records and performances for the group and featuring in the 1999 movie also titled Buena Vista Social Club. Ever since, he has also worked with Juan de Marcos González's Afro-Cuban All Stars and with Ruben González. On July 7, 2007 he performed at Live Earth in Hamburg, Germany.

== See also ==
- Ibrahim Ferrer
- Rubén González
- Compay Segundo
