= Buena Vista Social Club (film) =

1999 documentary film by Wim Wenders on Cuban music

- Theatrical release poster
- Directed by: Wim Wenders
- Written by: Wim Wenders
- Produced by: Ulrich Felsberg; Deepak Nayar
- Starring: see below
- Cinematography: Jörg Widmer
- Edited by: Brian Johnson
- Production companies: Arte; Instituto Cubano del Arte e Industria Cinematográficos; Kintop Pictures; Road Movies Filmproduktion; Wim Wenders Stiftung
- Distributed by: Senator Film (Germany); Artisan Entertainment (United States); FilmFour Distributors (United Kingdom); Mars Distribution (France); Summit Entertainment (International)
- Release dates: 17 February 1999 (BIFF); 4 June 1999 (United States)
- Running time: 105 minutes
- Countries: Germany; Cuba; United States; United Kingdom; France
- Languages: English; Spanish
- Box office: $23 million

Buena Vista Social Club is a 1999 documentary film directed by Wim Wenders about the music of Cuba, featuring the musicians who recorded the 1997 album Buena Vista Social Club. The film is an international co-production of Germany, the United States, the United Kingdom, France, and Cuba.

In 2020, the film was selected for preservation in the United States National Film Registry by the Library of Congress as being "culturally, historically or aesthetically significant".

== Content ==
The film documents how long-time friend of Wenders, Ry Cooder (who had brought together the group of legendary Cuban musicians who recorded the album), returned to Havana in early 1998 to record a new album by singer Ibrahim Ferrer.

It includes concert performances by the group's full line-up: in April 1998 in Amsterdam (two nights at the Royal Theater Carré) and the 1st of July 1998 in the United States (at the Carnegie Hall, New York City).

Although they are geographically close, travel between Cuba and the United States is restricted due to the political tension between the two countries, so many of the artists were travelling there for the first time. The film shows their reactions to this experience, and includes footage of the resultant sell-out concerts. It also features interviews with each of the main performers.

== Musicians ==
- Francisco Repilado, aka Compay Segundo (vocals and tres)
- Eliades Ochoa (vocals and guitar)
- Ry Cooder (slide guitar)
- Joachim Cooder, Ry's son (percussion)
- Ibrahim Ferrer (vocals, congas, claves, bongos)
- Omara Portuondo (vocals)
- Rubén González (piano)
- Orlando "Cachaito" López (Double bass)
- Amadito Valdés
- Manuel "Guajiro" Mirabal (trumpet)
- Barbarito Torres (laúd)
- Pío Leyva
- Manuel "Puntillita" Licea (vocals)
- Juan de Marcos González (güiro)

== Songs ==
1. "Chan Chan" (Francisco Repilado)
2. "Silencio" (Rafael Hernandez)
3. "Chattanooga Choo Choo" (Harry Warren and Mack Gordon)
4. "Dos Gardenias" (Isolina Carillo)
5. "Veinte Años" (María Teresa Vera)
6. "¿Y Tú Qué Has Hecho?" (Eusebio Delfin)
7. "Black Bottom" (Ray Henderson, Lew Brown and B. G. De Sylva)
8. "Canto Siboney" (Ernesto Lecuona Casado)
9. "El Carretero" (Jose "Guillermo Portabales" Quesada del Castillo)
10. "Cienfuegos (tiene su guaguanco)" (Victor Lay)
11. "Begin the Beguine" (Cole Porter)
12. "Buena Vista Social Club" (Orestes Lopez, inventor of the mambo in 1937)
13. "Mandinga" (also known as "Bilongo", Guillermo Rodriguez Fiffe)
14. "Candela" (Faustino Oramas),
15. "Chanchullo" (Israel "Cachao" Lopez, the father of Cachaito)
16. "El Cuarto de Tula" (son/descarga, Sergio Siaba)
17. "Guateque Campesino" (Celia Romero "Guateque")
18. "Nuestra Ultima Cita" (Forero Esther)
19. "Quizás, Quizás, Quizás" (bolero by Oswaldo Farres)

== Release ==
=== Critical reception ===
Buena Vista Social Club received critical acclaim. On Rotten Tomatoes, the film has a 92% score based on 48 reviews, with an average rating of 7.5/10. The consensus summarizes: "A hopeful gesture of cultural outreach set to an irresistible soundtrack, Buena Vista Social Club is an enriching and zesty experience." Metacritic reports an 81 out of 100 rating based on 19 critics.

=== Accolades ===
The film was nominated for an Academy Award for Best Documentary Feature in 2000. It won as best documentary in the European Film Awards as well as many others. The album Buena Vista Social Club features studio versions of the music heard in the film.

== Influence ==
The film helped the musicians, some of them already in their nineties, become known to a worldwide audience, with some going on to release popular solo albums. These included Ibrahim Ferrer, Compay Segundo, Rubén González and Elíades Ochoa. The latter went on to support younger musicians making the same style of music beyond 2010 under the name "Buena Vista Social Club".

== See also ==
- List of Cuban films
- Buena Vista Social Club: Adios
