= Clave =

Clave or claves may refer to:

== Music ==
- Clave (rhythm), a rhythmic pattern found in some Afro-Cuban Music
- Claves, a percussion instrument
- Claves Records, Swiss record label

== Other ==
- Clave (newspaper), a Dominican newspaper
- Clave (Mexico City Metrobús), a BRT station in Mexico City
- Claves, a fictional character in the video game Eternal Sonata

== See also ==
- Clavé (disambiguation)
