= Jesús "Aguaje" Ramos =

Cuban musician

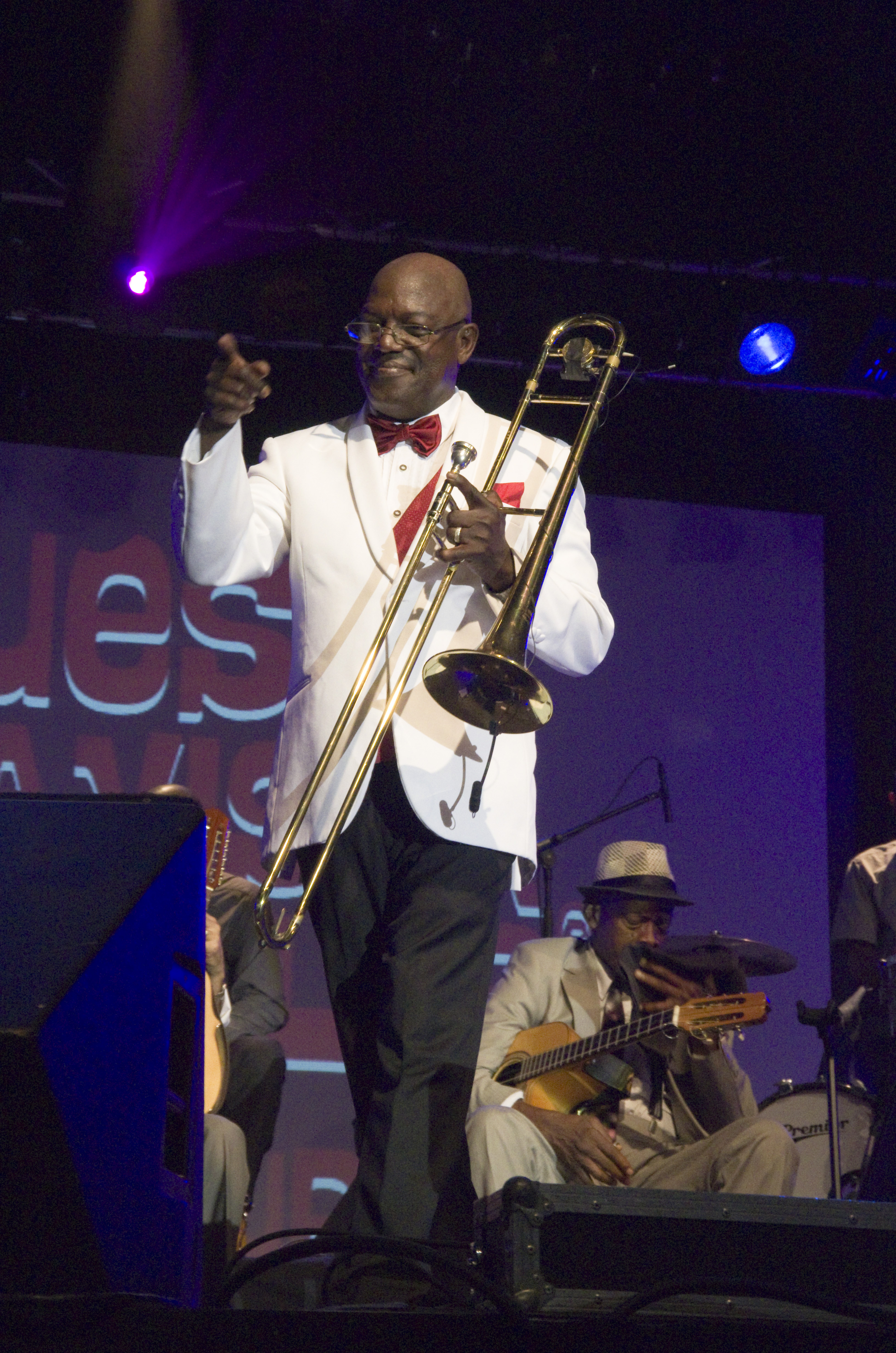

Background information
- Birth name: Jesús Ramos
- Born: 1951 (age 73–74); Pinar del Río, Cuba
- Occupation(s): Musician, musical director
- Instrument: Trombone
- Labels: EGREM, World Circuit

Jesús "Aguaje" Ramos (born 1951) is a Cuban trombonist and musical director. He has been a member of various ensembles, including Estrellas de Areito, Buena Vista Social Club and Afro-Cuban All Stars.

== Life and career ==
Ramos was born in 1951 in Pinar del Río where he began his musical studies in the National School of Arts. He started playing the trombone in local groups until 1979 when he moved to Havana and began playing with the popular female quartet Las D’Aida. That same year he took part in the Estrellas de Areito recordings.

Ramos has played on the World Circuit recordings of the Buena Vista Social Club and Afro-Cuban All Stars, and the solo albums of Ibrahim Ferrer, Rubén González and Omara Portuondo. He was Rubén González’s musical director and he has been touring extensively since 1997 with the various Buena Vista Social Club projects. Ramos intended to record an album as leader for World Circuit in 2001, but the record was not finished; some tracks from these sessions ("Bodas de Oro", "Guajira en F") were later released on Lost and Found.

In 2018, Ramos released two singles under the title "Jesus 'Aguaje' Ramos y su Orquesta Buena Vista", "Massacre" and "Babalú".

== See also ==
- Generoso Jiménez
- Yaite Ramos Rodriguez
