= Manuel "Guajiro" Mirabal =

Cuban trumpeter (1933–2024)

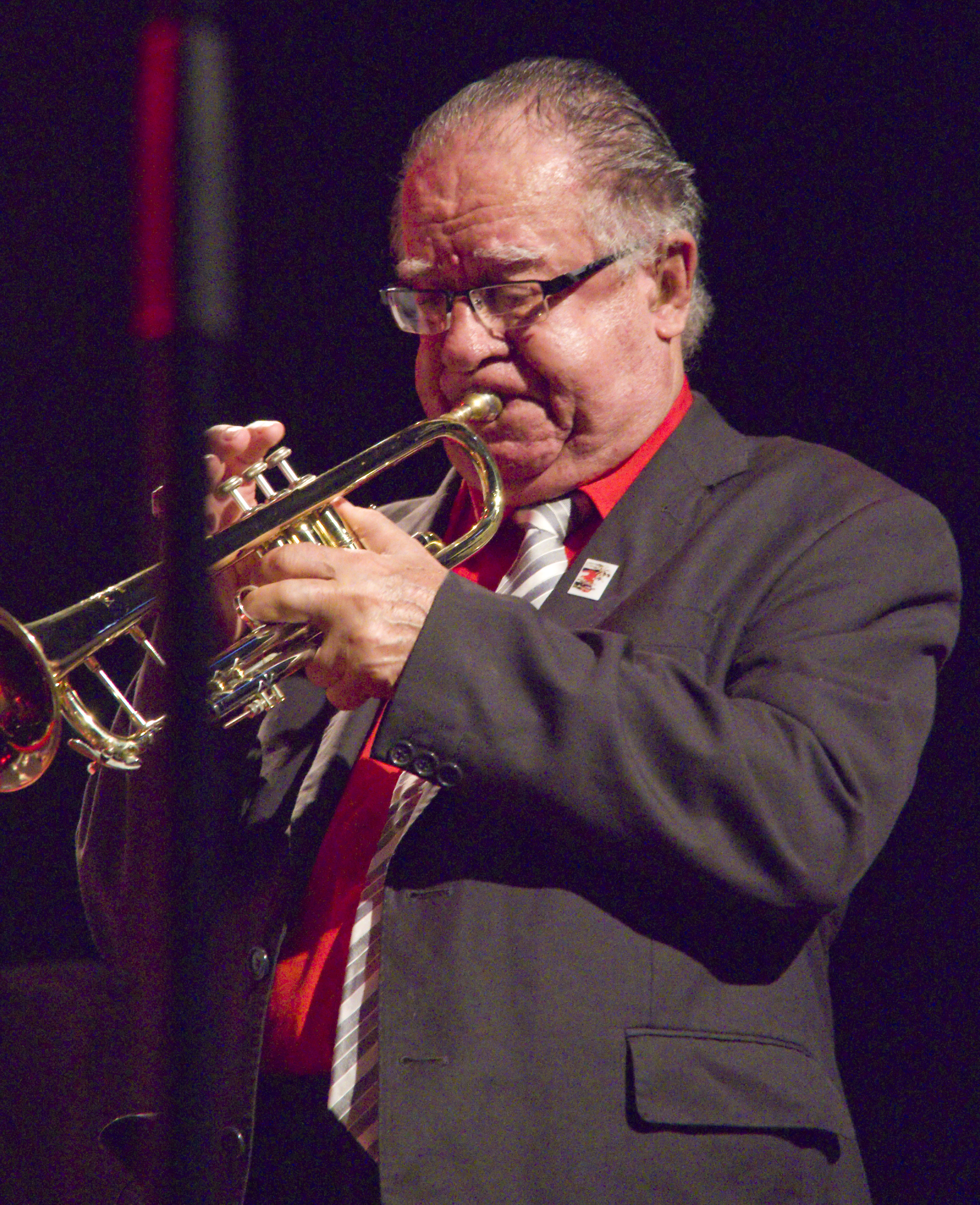
- Mirabal performing in 2015

Background information
- Also known as: Guajiro
- Born: Manuel Mirabal Vásquez; 5 May 1933; Melena del Sur, Cuba
- Died: 28 October 2024 (aged 91) Havana, Cuba
- Genres: Guajira
- Occupation: Musician
- Instrument: Trumpet
- Years active: 1951–2024

Manuel "Guajiro" Mirabal (5 May 1933 – 28 October 2024) was a Cuban trumpeter, best known for his work with the Buena Vista Social Club.

== Biography ==
Mirabal was born on 5 May 1933 in Melena del Sur on Cuba, near Havana. His father was director of the local municipal band. He learned to play trumpet as a child and was performing by the age of 13. He said he had never had any formal training and had learned to play by copying what he heard on the radio. Mirabal turned professional aged 18 and joined a jazz band, Swing Casino, in 1953. He started his own group, Conjunto Rumbavana, in 1956. In 1960 he joined one of Cuba's leading groups, the Orquesta Riverside. The group's Puerto Rican singer Tito Gomez nicknamed him 'the country boy', El Guajiro. There followed stints with various orchestras including Orquesta del ICRT, the official orchestra of Cuban state radio and television.

Mirabal was a celebrated performer in the "golden era" of Cuban music in the 1940s and 1950s, before Castro's revolution. By the 1990s he was living quietly in Havana and considering retirement. He was contacted in 1996 by musician/producer Juan de Marcos Gonzalez and invited to record two albums with a group of veteran Cuban musicians, to be called the Afro-Cuban All Stars. A British record producer, Nick Gold, owner of World Circuit Records, had become fascinated by the Son Cubano, which came from eastern Cuba with Hispanic and west African roots. Gold fell in love with Mirabel's playing.

One album was to have been a big band tribute to Cuba's musical heritage, the other a guitar-based collaboration with Malian musicians and American slide guitarist Ry Cooder. The Malian guitarists did not arrive and Gold filled the week of studio time instead with Cooder and the veteran Cuban musicians. The resulting album of fourteen songs, Buena Vista Social Club, was released in September 1997 and became a global hit, selling eight million copies. In July 1998, Mirabel and the other musicians on the album were flown to New York to play a sell-out concert at Carnegie Hall. A documentary of the event was nominated for an Oscar. In 1998 Mirabel and the other members of the band received a Latin Grammy award.

The group continued to tour and release albums until 2018. Mirabel played lead trumpet on records and in performances by the group and featured in the 1999 movie Buena Vista Social Club. He later released solo works under the Buena Vista Social Club Presents... umbrella, including an album which paid tribute to Cuban music legend Arsenio Rodríguez. In 2004 Mirabal released an album in partnership with Buena Vista Social Club entitled Buena Vista Social Club Presents Manuel Guajiro Mirabal. The album was widely acclaimed and was nominated for a Latin Grammy award. The Cuban government bestowed numerous honours on him, including an award for "Distinguished Services to the Armed Forces" in 2001. Cuban musicians Mirabal worked with included Ibrahim Ferrer, Omara Portuondo, Rubén González, Compay Segundo.

== Private life and death ==
Mirabal married Mérida Veldez in 1978. They had a son and a daughter.

Manuel Mirabal died in Havana on 28 October 2024 at the age of 91.

== See also ==
- Ibrahim Ferrer
- Rubén González
- Compay Segundo
- Omara Portuondo
