= Adolfo Pichardo =

Cuban musician

Adolfo Pichardo (born October 1939, Havana) is a Cuban pianist, conductor, arranger, and composer.

== Career ==
Pichardo studied piano at the Havana Municipal Conservatory, and in 1954 joined the band Conjunto Casino Juvenil as a pianist. He later came to direct the Orquesta Juvenil de Música Moderna.

The Cuban Orchestra of Modern Music was founded on April 23, 1967, and was one of the most famous of the time. Already in 1966, a group of young musicians had organized the Youth Orchestra of Modern Music, under the direction of pianist Adolfo Pichardo.

Pichardo directed the orchestra of the Tropicana cabaret for several years. In the 1990s, he joined Buena Vista Social Club and worked as an arranger and composer. In the 1960s, he married Tropicana dancer Yolanda Leon Suarez. His career included work as a musician, composer, arranger, and orchestral director, with performances in several European countries and collaborations with other musicians.
