= Chan Chan (song) =

- UK single cover for "Chan Chan"

Single by Buena Vista Social Club

from the album Buena Vista Social Club
- Released: September 16, 1997
- Recorded: March 1996
- Studio: EGREM (Havana)
- Genre: Son cubano
- Length: 4:16
- Label: World Circuit; Nonesuch
- Songwriter: Francisco Repilado
- Producer: Ry Cooder

Buena Vista Social Club singles chronology
"Chan Chan" (1997)	"Candela" (1998)

"Chan Chan" is a 1984 son composition by Cuban trovador Compay Segundo. It was first recorded in 1985 by Compay Segundo's own group. In 1987, he approached Eliades Ochoa, who agreed to record a version with the Cuarteto Patria. However, EGREM did not release these recordings until the second half of the 1990s. In November 1995, Compay recorded a new version in Madrid for his Antología, released on CD the following year. In March 1996, Compay Segundo, Eliades Ochoa and other veteran Cuban musicians recorded a new version of the song as part of the Buena Vista Social Club project. The song became the opening track of their eponymous album and the group's signature song, thereby achieving international fame.

== Lyrics and composition ==
The song was written in 1984 by Compay Segundo, who first "dreamt" the opening melody in his sleep and later wrote the lyrics. On the composition of the song, Compay Segundo said:

I didn't compose Chan Chan, I dreamt it. I dream of music. I sometimes wake up with a melody in my head, I hear the instruments, all very clear. I look over the balcony and I see nobody, but I hear it as if it was played on the street. I don't know what it can be. One day I woke up hearing those four sensitive notes, I gave them a lyric inspired by a children's tale from my childhood, Juanica y Chan Chan, and you see, now it's sung everywhere.

Lyrically, the song is set on the beach and revolves around two central characters called Juanica and Chan Chan. The most complete explanation says: 'The song relates the story of a man and a woman (Chan Chan and Juanica) who are building a house, and go to the beach to get some sand. Chan Chan collects the sand and puts it on the jibe (a sieve for sand). Juanica shakes it, and to do so she shakes herself, making Chan Chan embarrassed. [...] The origin of this tale is a farmer song learnt by Compay Segundo when he was twelve years old.'

The most recognizable part of the song is its chorus, whose lyrics are as follows:

De Alto Cedro voy para Marcané

Llego a Cueto voy para Mayarí

From Alto Cedro I go to Marcané

I get to Cueto, then head for Mayarí

The four mentioned locations (Alto Cedro, Marcané, Cueto and Mayarí) are towns near each other in the Holguín Province on the east side of Cuba. It is a common practice in son cubano to mention Cuban toponyms, as in the 1952 standard "Alto Songo".

== Recordings ==
According to Compay himself, the first performance of the song took place in the club Cristino, sometime in the mid-1980s. According to the EGREM archives, the first recording of the song was made in 1985 at the EGREM studios (Areito), Havana, by Compay Segundo and his group. EGREM did not issue this recording (or the rest of the session) on CD until 1996.

In 1987, he approached Eliades Ochoa, who agreed to record a version with the Cuarteto Patria, along with other older songs by Compay, who needed new recordings to be able to claim royalties. The songs were recorded in 1989 at the EGREM studios (Siboney), Santiago de Cuba, for the album Chanchaneando, who was released on CD years later. Compay Segundo and the Cuarteto Patria, with Eliades Ochoa on lead vocals and guitar, would often play the song at the Casa de la Trova in Santiago, where the song began to gain popularity among trova fans.

In 1992, Compay recorded "Chan Chan" with Pablo Milanés for his Años Vol. III album. In 1994, Compay and his group travelled to Spain for the Primer Encuentro entre el Son y el Flamenco, bringing "Chan Chan" with them, and later in November 1995, Compay recorded a new version in Madrid for his Antología, released on CD the following year.

In March 1996, Compay Segundo, Eliades Ochoa and other veteran Cuban musicians recorded a new version of the song as part of the Buena Vista Social Club project. The song became the opening track of their eponymous album (released in September 1997) and the group's signature song, thereby achieving international fame.

== Certifications ==
Region	Certification	Certified units/sales
United Kingdom (BPI) Sales since 2006	Silver	200,000^{‡}
^{‡} Sales+streaming figures based on certification alone.

== See also ==
Buena Vista Social Club "Chan Chan" (1997)
30 second sample from Buena Vista Social Club's "Chan Chan".

- Buena Vista Social Club
- Buena Vista Social Club (album)
