= Armónico =

Cuban string instrument

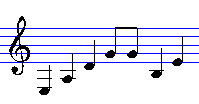
Armonico tuning.

The armónico, also known as trilina, is a guitar-like instrument from Cuba. It is a hybrid between the Spanish guitar and the Cuban tres. The armónico has seven strings: five single strings, plus one pair of strings tuned in unison. The armónico was invented by Cuban trova musician Compay Segundo, who loved the instrument as it allowed him to exploit the possibilities of both the guitar and the tres.

Counting from the lowest-pitched, the first three strings, E, A and D, are tuned an octave higher than the equivalent strings on a guitar with standard tuning. The fourth string, G, is doubled as well as also being an octave higher than on a guitar. The remaining two, B and E, are at the same pitch as a standard guitar. Therefore, the bottom E string is only one octave lower than the top E string on the armónico, instead of two octaves lower on the guitar.

== Gallery ==
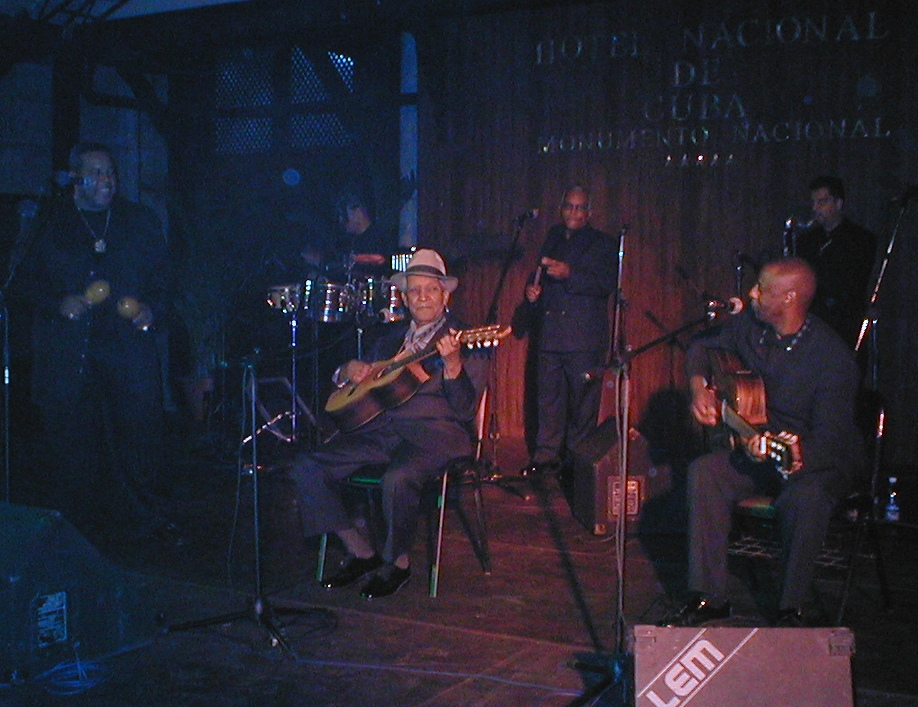
Compay Segundo playing his armónico

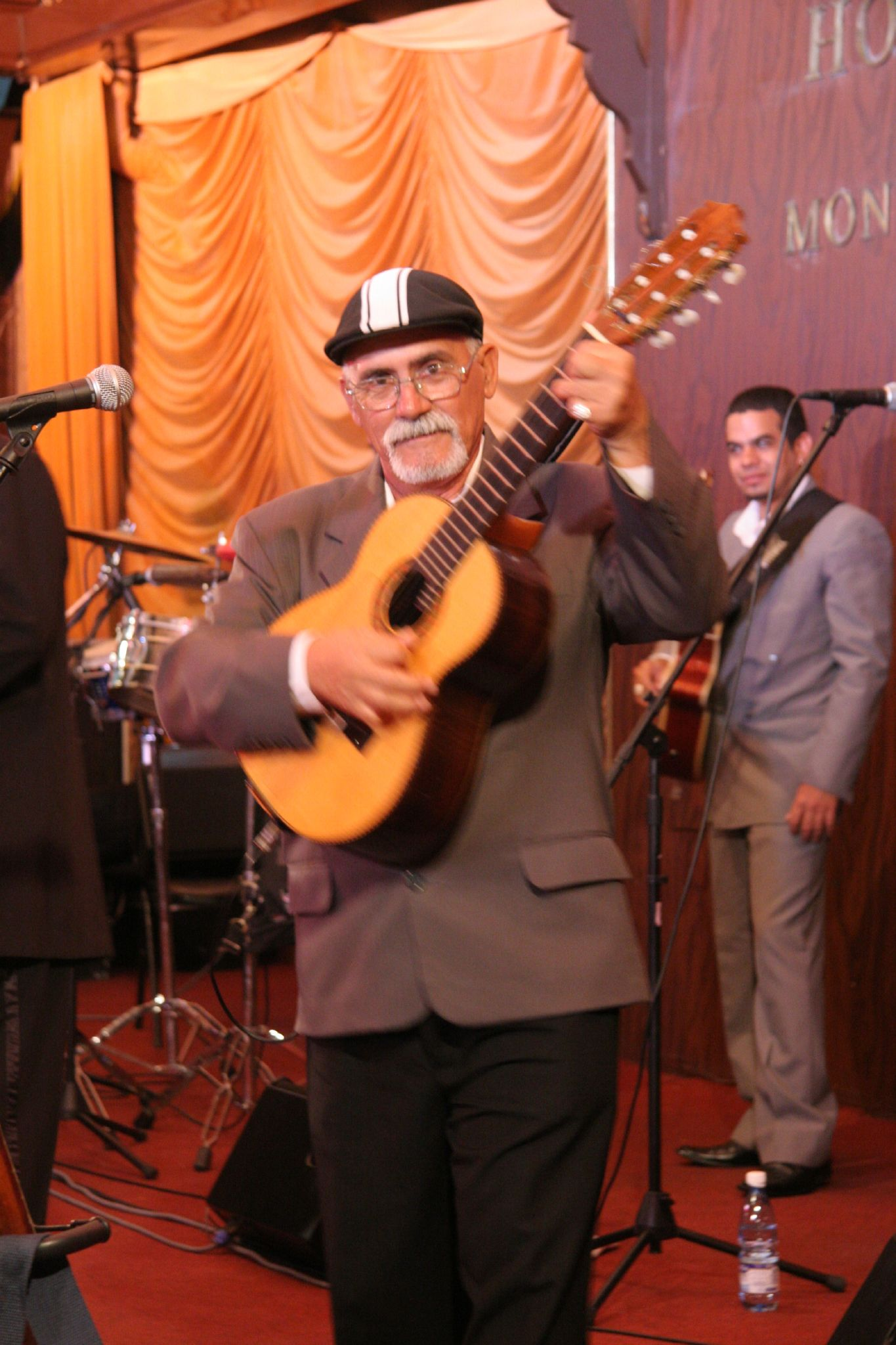
Felix Martinez of Grupo Compay Segundo with an armónico

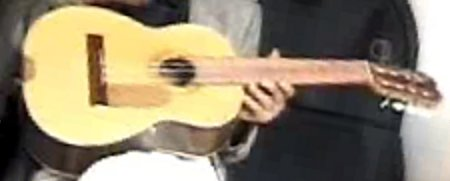
Compay Segundo holding his armónico

== See also ==
- Trova
- Son montuno
