= Clavé (disambiguation) =

Clavé is a village in France.

Clavé may also refer to:

== People ==
- André Clavé (1916–1981), French actor
- Anselmo Clavé (1824–1874), Spanish musician and poet
- Antoni Clavé (1913–2005), Spanish painter
- Florenci Clavé (1936–1998), Spanish cartoonist
- Josep Anselm Clavé (1824–1874), Catalan politician
- Josep Torres Clavé (1906–1939), Spanish architect
- Pelegrí Clavé (1811–1888), Spanish painter
- Pierre Clavé (1887–1974), French equestrian
- André-Joseph Lafitte-Clavé (1740–1794), French Army engineering officer

== Other ==
- Clavé Goéland, French aircraft
- American Clavé, record label
