= Barbarito Torres =

Cuban musician

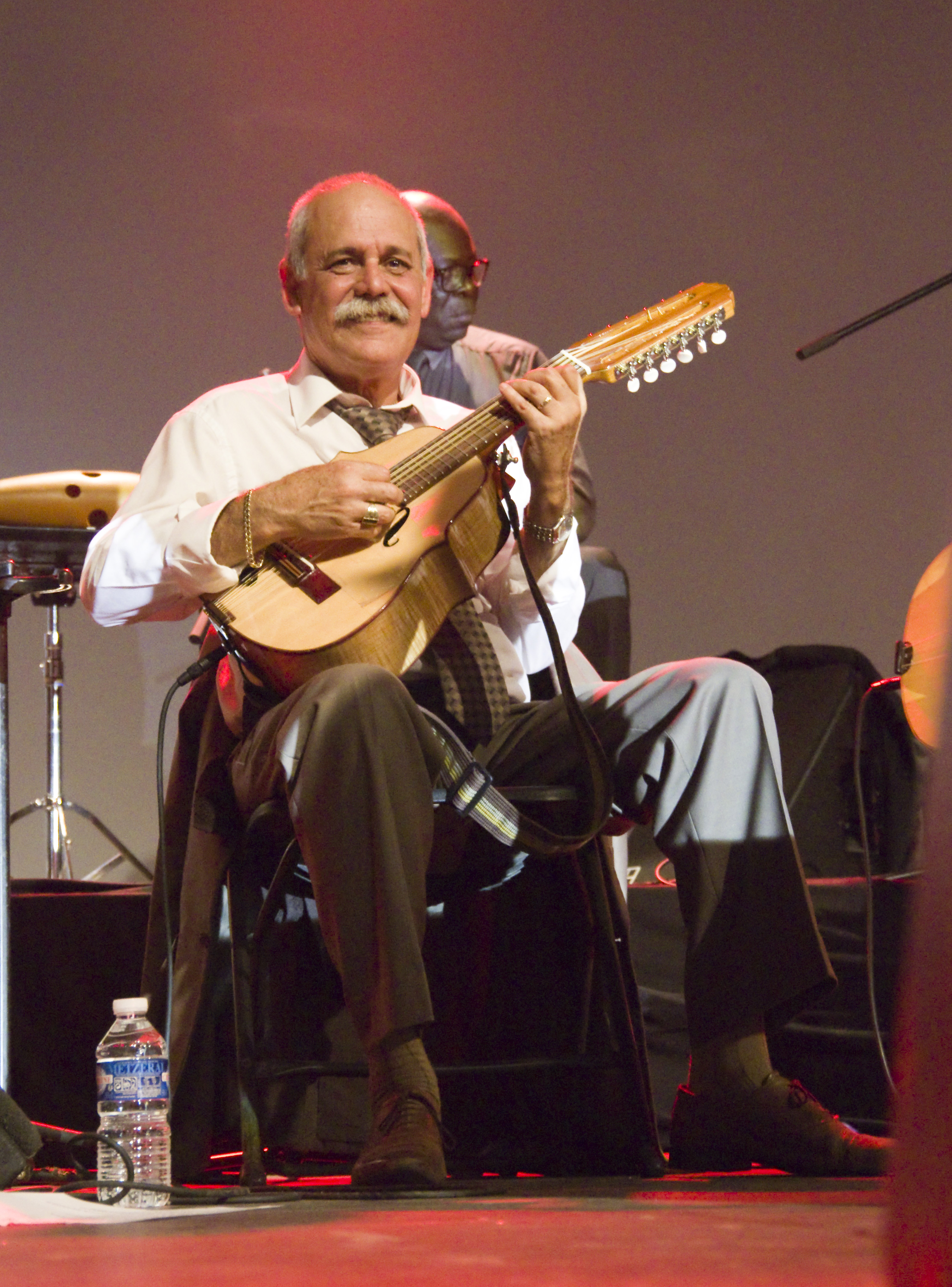
- Barbarito Torres performing live on Zelt-Musik-Festival in Freiburg im Breisgau, Germany, 6 July 2015

Background information
- Also known as: Barbarito Torres
- Born: Bárbaro Alberto Torres Delgado; 1956 (age 69–70); Matanzas, Cuba
- Genres: punto guajiro
- Occupation: Musician
- Instrument: Laúd

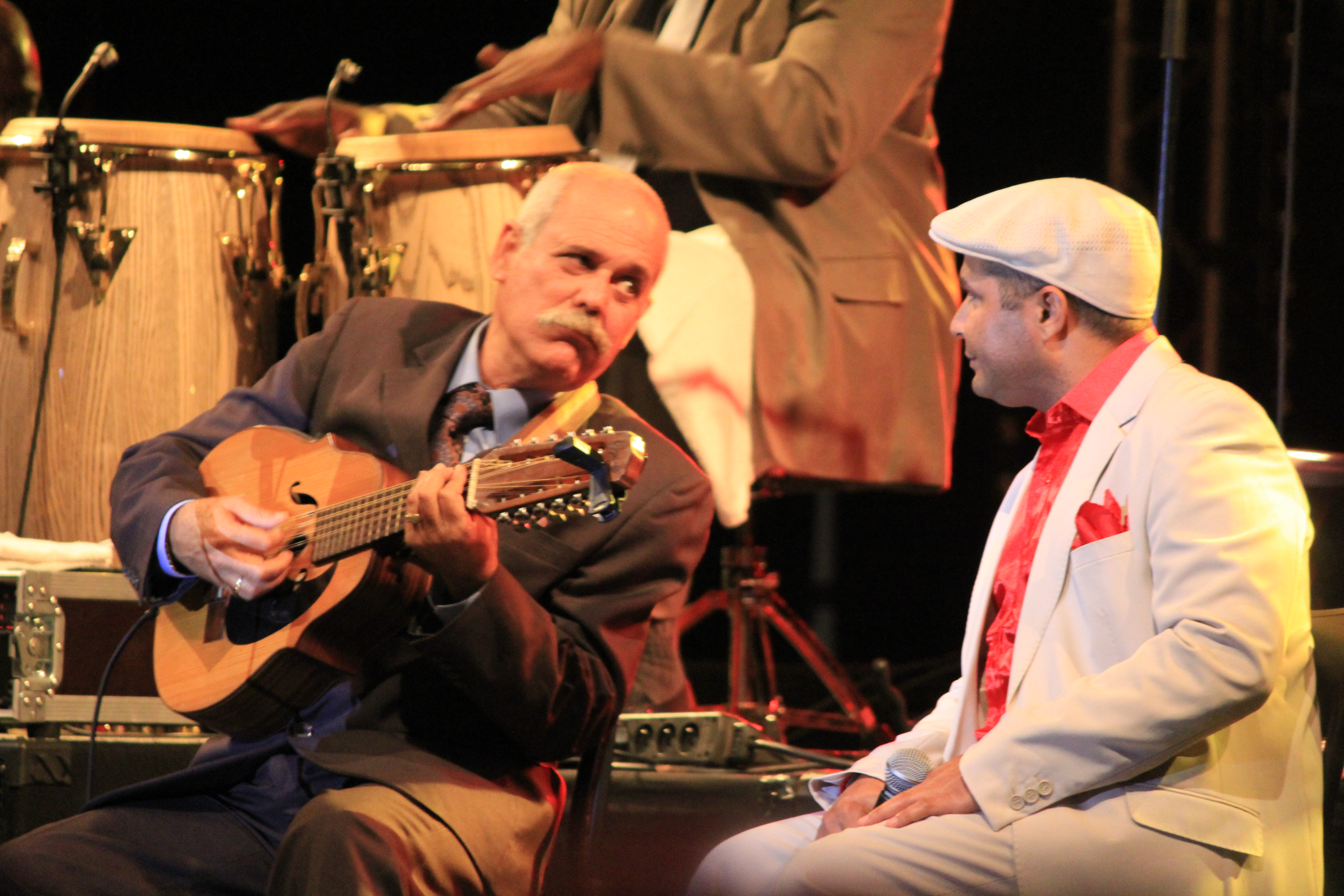
Barbarito Torres and Carlos Calunga performing with Orquesta Buena Vista Social Club in 2012.

Bárbaro Alberto Torres Delgado (born 1956), better known as Barbarito Torres, is a Cuban musician best known for his work with the Afro-Cuban All Stars and the Buena Vista Social Club since 1996. Torres plays the laúd, a traditional Cuban instrument of the lute family that is most associated with the punto guajiro genre. He continues to tour with Buena Vista Social Club as one of the last surviving original members and has recorded several solo albums, the last of which, Vámonos pa'l monte, was released in 2016.

== Biography ==
Torres was born in Matanzas, Cuba, in 1956. He played in a series of military bands during the 1970s, before settling in Havana and becoming a permanent member of Orquesta Cubana de Cuerdas. He became musical director for Celina González's Grupo Campoalegre and worked with some of Havana's most prominent musicians.

In March 1996, Torres began working the Afro-Cuban All Stars which led him to be included in the Buena Vista Social Club ensemble. Torres went on to play a prominent role playing on both records and performances for the group, featuring in the 1999 movie also titled Buena Vista Social Club. Barbarito has since released solo works including Havana Café, which featured a number of the players that had been featured in his previous ensembles, including Ibrahim Ferrer and Omara Portuondo.

He has become renowned for his virtuoso solos on the laúd, which often include playing the instrument behind his back.

== Discography ==
- Havana Cafe (1999)
- Barbarito Torres (2003)
- Vámonos pa'l monte (2016)
- AmeriCuba (2017; collaborative album)

== See also ==
- Compay Segundo
- Manuel Galbán
- Papi Oviedo
