= Artists' Project Earth =

British charity

Artists' Project Earth is a UK registered charity which recruits internationally known musicians and artists through albums, concerts, art exhibitions and art related projects to raise awareness of climate change and funds for campaigns and disaster relief.

On 20 February 2018, Artists Project Earth (APE) launched their Plastic Oceans Album at the Ocean Plastics Crisis Summit in London. An array of international artists including Ed Sheeran, Bob Dylan and Coldplay have contributed to the album with the purpose to raise awareness and funds aiming to counter plastic pollution of the oceans.
