= Eliades Ochoa =

Cuban singer and composer

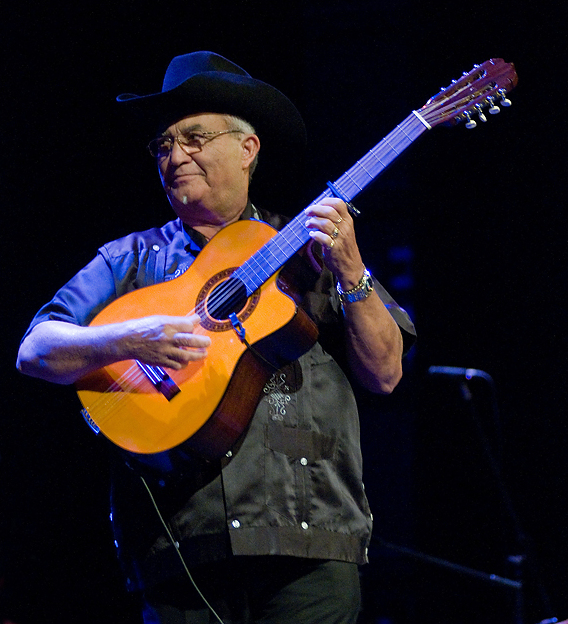
- Ochoa performing live May 2009; Photo: Juan Gonzales Andres

Background information
- Born: 22 June 1946 (age 80); Songo – La Maya, Cuba
- Genres: Cuban Son, Cuban Trova, Latin jazz, salsa
- Occupations: Musician, songwriter, record producer
- Instruments: Vocals, guitar, tres
- Years active: 1978–present
- Formerly of: Cuarteto Patria
- Website: http://www.eliadesochoaofficial.com/

Eliades Ochoa Bustamante (born 22 June 1946) is a Cuban guitarist and singer from Loma de la Avispa, Songo La Maya in the east of the country near Santiago de Cuba.

== Biography ==
He began playing the guitar when he was six and in 1978 he was invited to join Cuarteto Patria, a group founded in 1939, as its leader. Although he looks like a guajiro, and he still wears his trademark cowboy hat, his roots are in the son, and he only agreed to take on the role of leader if he was allowed to introduce new elements to the repertoire. He plays the guitar, tres and also a variant of the guitar, with two additional strings. His involvement with the Buena Vista Social Club and the Wim Wenders film of the same name (1999), has led him to worldwide fame.

In 2010 he recorded an album with a number of Cuban and Malian musicians, including Toumani Diabaté, titled AfroCubism.

== Discography ==
=== Albums ===
- Harina de maíz criolla (1980)
- Son de Oriente (1980)
- María Cristina me quiere gobernar (1982)
- Chanchaneando con Compay Segundo (1989)
- La parranda del Teror con el Cuarteto Patria (1992)
- A una coqueta (1993)
- Se soltó un león (1993)
- La trova de Santiago de Cuba. ¡Ay, mamá, qué bueno! (1995)
- Eliades Ochoa y el Cuarteto Patria (1996)
- Buena Vista Social Club (1997)
- CubÁfrica (1996)
- Cuidadito Compay gallo...que llegó el perico (1998)
- Continental Drifter (1999)
- Sublime Ilusión (1999)
- Tributo al Cuarteto Patria (2000)
- Estoy como nunca (2002)
- Las 5 leyendas (2005)
- AfroCubism (2010)
- Un Bolero Para Ti (2011)
- Mi guitarra canta (2011)
- Eliades y la Banda del Jigüe (2011)
- Lo más reciente de Eliades Ochoa (2012)
- El Eliades que Soy (2014)
- Lost and Found (2015)
- Los años no determinan (2016)
- Dos Gigantes de Música Cubana (2018) with Alejandro Almenares
- Guajiro (2023)

=== Compilations ===
- Grandes éxitos de Eliades Ochoa (2001)
- Cuarteto Patria 1965-1981 (2004)
- Guajiro Sin Fronteras: Grandes Exitos (2005)
- A la Casa de la Trova (2005)
- The Essential Collection (2005)
- Best of Buena Vista (2006)
- Coleccion Cubana (2007)

=== Collaborations ===
- 1996 Manu Dibango, CD CubÁfrica
- 1996 Bévinda, CD Hasta siempre comandante
- 1998 Cyrius Martínez, CD De Santiago a Baracoa
- 1999 Charlie Musselwhite, CD Continental Drifter
- 1999 Hermanas Ferrín, CD Mi linda guajira
- 1999 Moncho (Ramón Calabuch Batista), CD Quédate conmigo
- 2000 Luis Eduardo Aute, CD Mira que eres canalla Aute!
- 2001 Jarabe de palo, CD De vuelta y vuelta
- 2004 Blof Umoja, CD Umoja
- 2010 Buena Fe, CD Pi 3,14
- 2010 William Vivianco, CD El mundo está cambiao
- 2011 Enrique Bunbury, CD Cantinas
- 2011 Lia (Ofelia), CD Lia, océano de amor
- 2013 David Blanco, CD Amigos
- 2013 Bob Dylan, CD From another world
- 2014 Pupy y los que son son (César Pedroso), CD Sin límites
- 2016 María Ochoa, CD Guajira más Guajira
