= Ibrahim Ferrer =

Cuban singer (1927–2005)

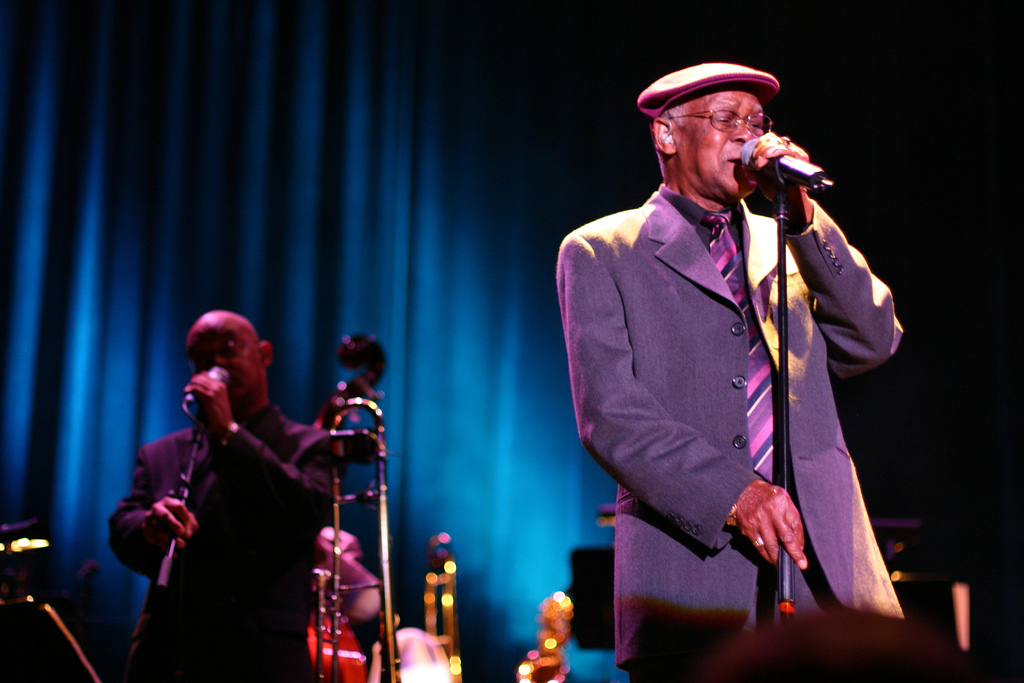
- Ferrer performing in 2004

Background information
- Born: 20 February 1927; San Luis, Cuba
- Died: 6 August 2005 (aged 78) Havana, Cuba
- Genres: Son; guaracha; bolero
- Instrument: Vocals
- Years active: 1939–2005
- Labels: Valle; Corona; Panart; EGREM; World Circuit
- Formerly of: Jovenes del Son; Los Bocucos; Conjunto Sorpresa; Chepín y su Orquesta Oriental; Afro-Cuban All Stars; Buena Vista Social Club

Ibrahim Ferrer (20 February 1927 – 6 August 2005) was a Cuban singer and songwriter who played with the group Los Bocucos for nearly forty years. He also performed with Conjunto Sorpresa, Chepín y su Orquesta Oriental, and Mario Patterson. After his retirement in 1991, he was brought back in the studio to record with the Afro-Cuban All Stars and Buena Vista Social Club, in March 1996. He then toured internationally with these revival groups and recorded several solo albums for World Circuit, before his death in 2005.

== Early life ==
Ferrer was born at a dance club in San Luis, near the city of Santiago de Cuba. His mother died when he was twelve, leaving him orphaned and forcing him to sing on the streets to earn money.

The following year, Ferrer joined his first musical group—a duet with his cousin—called Jóvenes del Son. They performed at private functions, and the two youths managed to scrape together enough money to live.

== Career ==
Over the next few years, Ferrer would perform with many musical groups, including Conjunto Sorpresa and Chepín y su Orquesta Oriental. As lead singer of the latter, Ferrer recorded in 1956 his biggest hit, "El platanal de Bartolo". In 1961, he also sang lead for Mario Patterson y su Orquesta Oriental on "Cariño falso", a standard of the guaracha repertoire.

=== Los Bocucos ===
In 1953, Ferrer began performing with Pacho Alonso's group in Santiago, Cuba. In 1959, the group moved permanently to Havana, renaming themselves Los Bocucos, after a type of drum widely used in Santiago, the bocú. With Alonso, Ferrer primarily performed sones, guarachas, and other up-tempo songs. However, his goal was to sing boleros.

Ferrer remained a member of Los Bocucos until his retirement in 1991. Starting in 1967, Los Bocucos became an independent group, since Pacho Alonso started a new band, Los Pachucos. Since then, Ferrer began to sing lead more often, instead of performing as a backing singer. The group released several albums in the 1970s and 1980s. In 1998, Cuban label EGREM released Tierra caliente, a compilation of tracks recorded by Los Bocucos between 1970 and 1988, featuring Ferrer as lead singer. The songs were directed and arranged by Roberto Correra, the group's lead trumpeter.

=== Career revival ===
In 1996, Ferrer took part in Nick Gold's World Circuit sessions when it was announced that an old-style bolero singer would be required. He first participated in the recording of the album A Toda Cuba le Gusta with the Afro-Cuban All Stars, which was nominated for a Grammy Award. This project was immediately followed by the recording of Ry Cooder's Grammy Award-winning Buena Vista Social Club, which showcased Ferrer's talent as a bolero singer and made him widely known outside Cuba.

In 1999, Ferrer released his first solo album, Buena Vista Social Club Presents Ibrahim Ferrer, also produced by Cooder. In 2000, at the age of 72, Ferrer received a Latin Grammy for Best New Artist.

In 2001, he appeared on the track "Latin Simone (¿Qué Pasa Contigo?)" on the self-titled debut album of virtual band Gorillaz. Following Ferrer's death, Gorillaz played the song live as a tribute to him at concerts in 2005 and 2006, and again in 2018.

In 2004, Ferrer won a Grammy but was denied permission by the US government to enter the country to receive his award as a result of extremely restrictive visa laws enacted in the wake of 9/11.

Ferrer released his second solo recording, Buenos Hermanos, in 2003 and continued touring in Europe into 2005. He contributed in 2005 to the APE Vision Artists' Project Earth album Rhythms del Mundo: Cuba, a collaboration with Coldplay, U2, Sting, Dido, Faithless, Jack Johnson, Maroon 5, and others. Ferrer's last recording was Mi sueño, an album devoted to the bolero. It was released posthumously in 2006.

The singer was posthumously featured in the Gorillaz documentary films Bananaz and Reject False Icons in 2008 and 2019, respectively.

== Personal life ==
Ferrer was an adherent of the Santería faith, a blending of the traditional Nigerian Yoruba religion and Catholicism.

== Death ==
Ibrahim Ferrer died at age 78 of multiple organ failure on 6 August 2005, at CIMEQ hospital in Havana, after returning from a European tour. He was buried at the Colon Cemetery, Havana.

== Discography ==
=== Albums ===
- Salsón (1982) – Ibrahim Ferrer & Conjunto Los Bocucos
- A Toda Cuba le Gusta (1997)
- Buena Vista Social Club (1997)
- Buena Vista Social Club Presents Ibrahim Ferrer (1999)
- Buenos Hermanos (2003)
- Mi Sueño (2007)
- Buena Vista Social Club at Carnegie Hall (2008)

=== Compilations ===
- Mi Oriente (1999) – Recorded 1956–1961
- Tierra Caliente – Ibrahim Ferrer con Los Bocucos (2000)
- Mis tiempos con Chepín y su Orquesta Oriental (2002)
- La Colección Cubana (2002) – Recorded 1960s–1970s
- ¡Qué Bueno Está! (2004) – Recorded 1960–1961
- Ay, Candela (2005) – Recorded 1960–1988
- Rhythms del Mundo (2006)
- Chepin Y Su Orquesta Oriental – Con: Ibrahim Ferrer (2014)
- Lost and Found (2015)

=== Singles ===
- "Silencio" (1999)
- "Buenos hermanos" (2003)
- "Boliviana" (2003)
- "El dandy" (2004)
- "Copla guajira" (2006)

== See also ==
- Benny Moré
- Compay Segundo
- Rubén González
