= Juan de Marcos González =

Cuban bandleader and musician

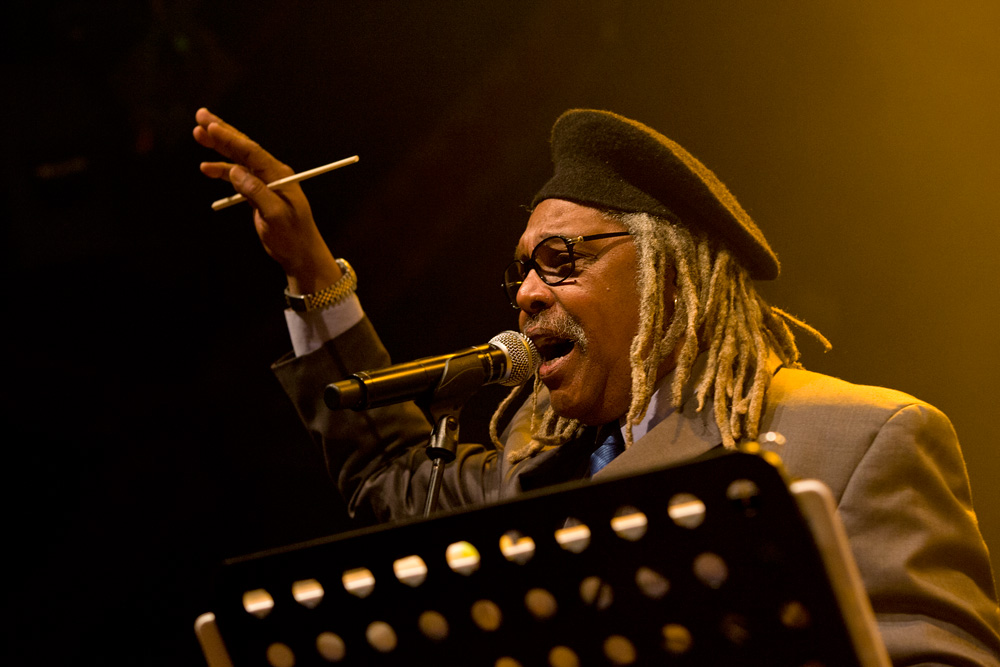
- Marcos González in 2012

Background information
- Born: Juan de Marcos González-Cárdenas; January 29, 1954 (age 72); Havana, Cuba
- Genres: Guajira; guaracha; bolero; Jazz; Afro-Cuban Jazz
- Occupations: Bandleader; musician; actor
- Years active: 1978–present

Juan de Marcos González (born Juan de Marcos González-Cárdenas; January 29, 1954) is a Cuban bandleader, musician and actor, best known for his work with the Buena Vista Social Club and in the 2021 Sony Pictures Animation film Vivo as the voice of Vivo's owner, Andrés.

== Biography ==
Juan de Marcos González was born in the Pueblo Nuevo barrio of Havana to a musical family. His father, Marcos González Mauriz (d March 1990), was a vocalist who performed with prominent bandleader Arsenio Rodríguez. He has two daughters, Gliceria and Laura Lidia González Abreu and one son, Juan de Marcos González Pérez. He studied classical and tres guitar at the Ignacio Cervantes Conservatory and with maestros Leopoldina Nuñez and Vicente "Gutun" Gonzalez. Later took courses on orchestral conduction and contemporary harmony at Goldsmith college, London.

Growing up, González was a fan of American and British rock music before rediscovering his Cuban roots and establishing a "traditional" Cuban band, Sierra Maestra, in 1978. González's stated goal was to keep the torch of Cuban folk music alive for a younger generation. Sierra Maestra has recorded fourteen albums in Cuba, and toured internationally.

González became a key member of the Buena Vista Social Club, using his contacts in the Cuban music world to locate musicians. When Ry Cooder arrived in Havana for recording, González himself was working an "all star" album tribute to the golden era greats of Cuban music, the Afro-Cuban All Stars, featuring many of the same musicians who comprise the Buena Vista Social Club. Subsequently, González led the Afro-Cuban All Stars and Rubén González on their European and American tours, and directed the Buena Vista Social Club concerts in Amsterdam, Mexico City and at Carnegie Hall.

He speaks Russian, English and Spanish and has some knowledge of Lucumi and Abakua.

He appeared in the Sony Pictures Animation film Vivo in 2021 as the voice of Andrés, Vivo's owner. González reprised his role in the Spanish dub of the film.

== See also ==
- Ibrahim Ferrer
- Rubén González
- Compay Segundo
