= Compay Segundo =

Cuban trova guitarist, singer, and composer (1907–2003)

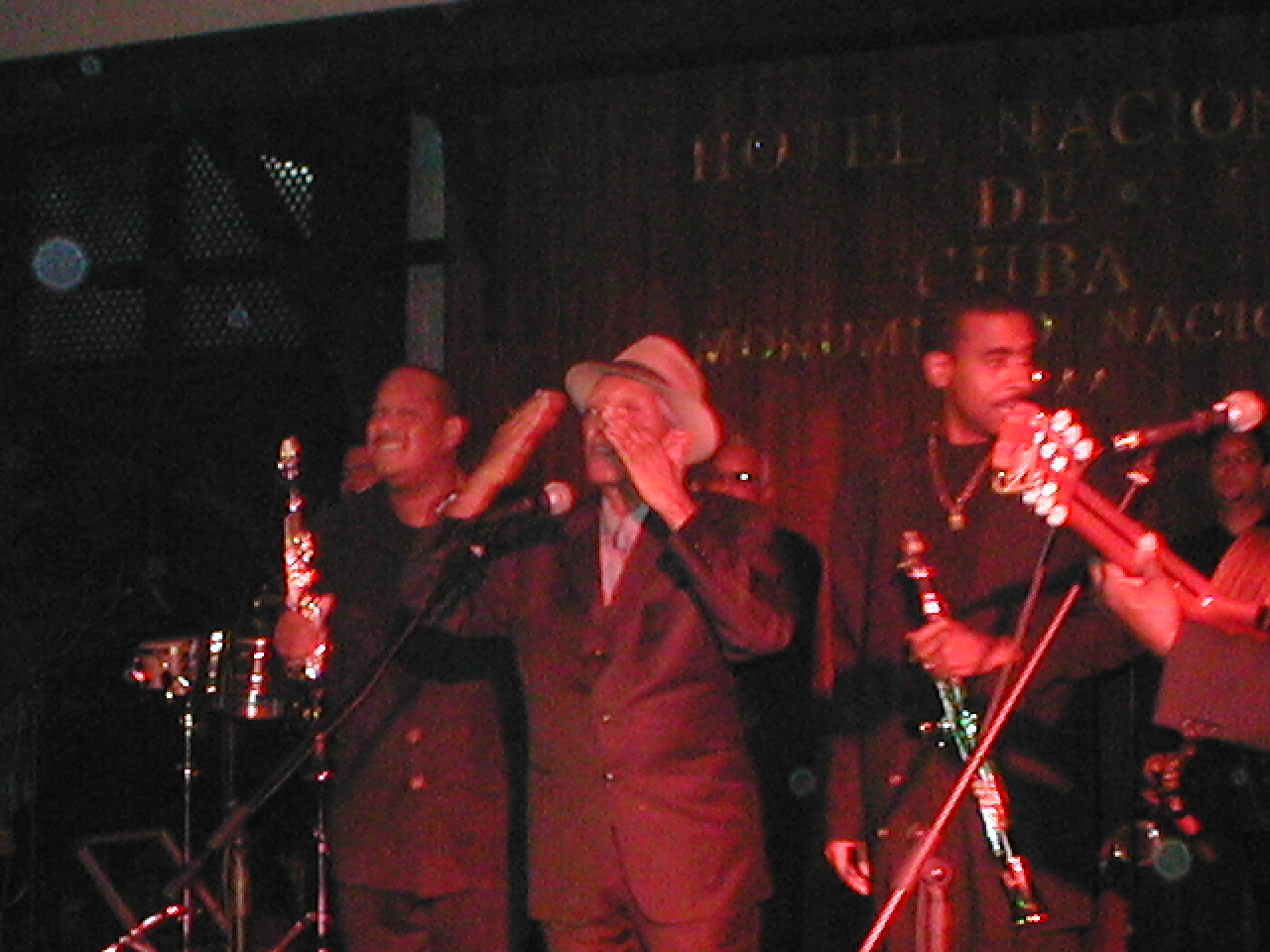
- Segundo at the Hotel Nacional de Cuba with a standing ovation in 2002

Background information
- Born: Máximo Francisco Repilado Muñoz Telles; 18 November 1907; Siboney, Cuba
- Died: 13 July 2003 (aged 95) Havana, Cuba
- Genres: Trova
- Occupations: Singer, guitarist, composer
- Instruments: Guitar, tres, armónico

Máximo Francisco Repilado Muñoz Telles (18 November 1907 – 13 July 2003), known professionally as "Compay Segundo", was a Cuban trova guitarist, singer and composer.

== Biography ==
Compay (meaning compadre) Segundo, so called because he was always second voice in his musical partnerships, was born in Siboney, Cuba, and moved to Santiago de Cuba at the age of nine. His first engagement was in the Municipal Band of Santiago de Cuba, directed by his teacher, Enrique Bueno. In 1934, after a spell in a quintet, he moved to Havana, where he also played the clarinet in CI the Municipal Band. He also learned to play the guitar and the tres, which became his usual instruments. Compay Segundo also invented the armónico, a seven-stringed guitar-like instrument, to fill the harmonic jump between the Spanish guitar and the tres. In the 1950s he became well known as the second voice and tres player in Los Compadres, a duo he formed with Lorenzo Hierrezuelo in 1947.

Los Compadres were one of the most successful Cuban duos of their time. The rediscovery of his music in Spain was with the help of Santiago Auserón in the 90's. Greater international fame came later, in 1997, with the release of the Buena Vista Social Club album, a hugely successful recording which won several Grammy awards. Compay Segundo appeared in the Wim Wenders film of the same title.

Segundo's most famous composition is "Chan Chan", the opening track on the Buena Vista Social Club album, a four-chord son song. "Chan Chan" was recorded by Segundo himself various times as well as by countless other Latin artists. Other compositions are "Sarandonga", "La calabaza", "Hey caramba", "Macusa", "Saludo Compay". These are all sones, and this differentiates siu him from the more usual trova musicians, with their devotion to the bolero. However, it seems his interests went much further:

I have danzones, waltzes, sones. I have some beautiful danzones. Why? Because I've learned from those who know how to preserve the tradition of the music. I play music the way it was played in yesteryear. I started out playing the son corto (short son). As Miguel Matamoros used to say, "The son is short and sweet."... Back in the day, they'd start out playing son at seven in the evening, and they'd greet the dawn with it.

At a fiesta he sang to President Fidel Castro, who took his pulse and joked about his vitality despite his 90-plus years. "Who could have imagined that?" he asked when he found himself at the Vatican City, performing "Chan Chan" before Pope John Paul II. He explained his longevity simply: mutton consommé and a drink of rum.

He predicted that he would live to be 115, but died of kidney failure in Havana, 20 years short of his ambition.

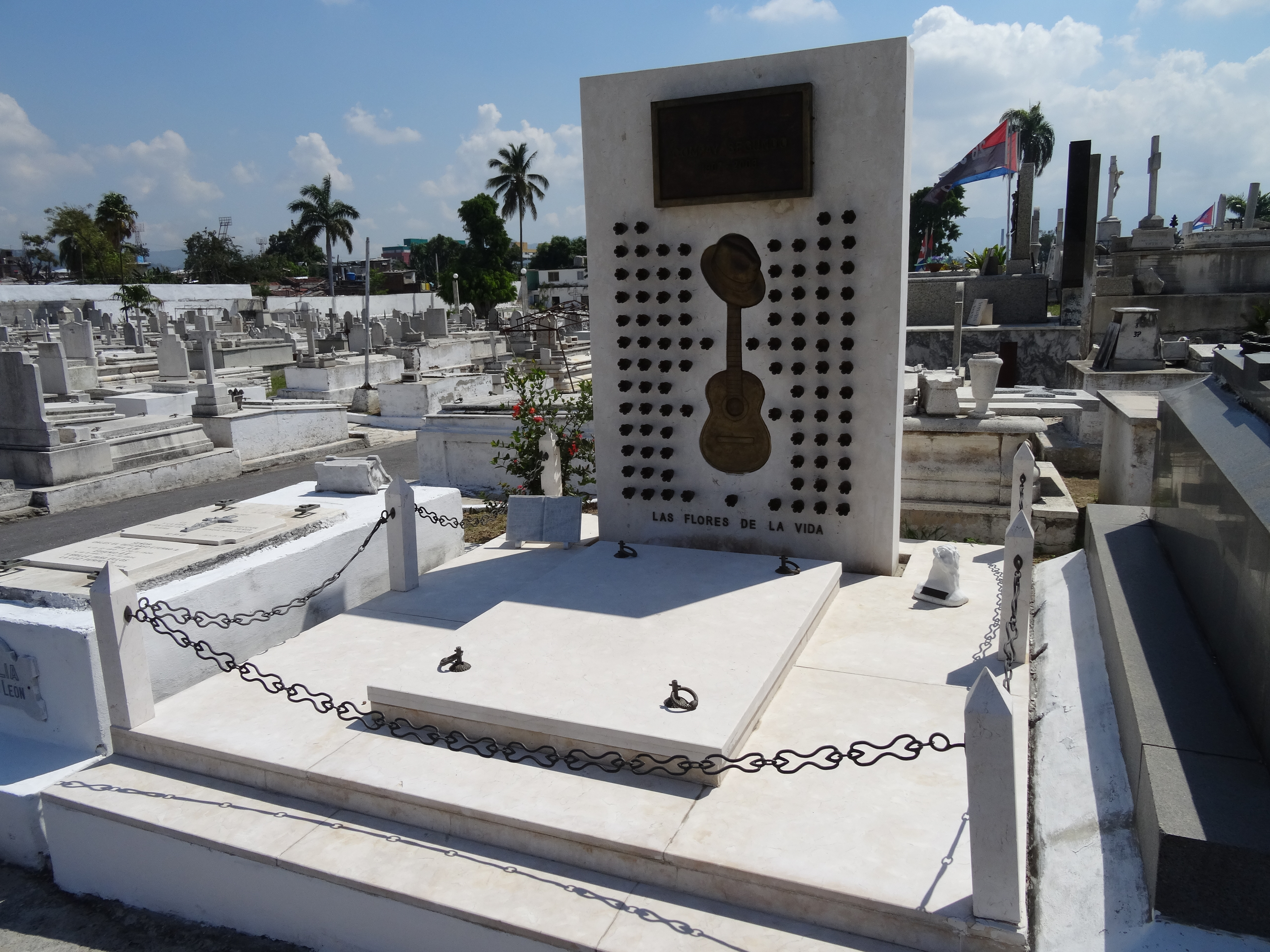
The tomb of Compay Segundo at the Cementerio de Santa Ifigenia in Santiago de Cuba. March 2014

In 2007, the 100th anniversary of Segundo's birth was celebrated with a concert of his compositions performed by a symphony orchestra in Havana with some of his musicians and sons.

== Discography ==
- 1942–55
  - Sentimiento guajiro
  - Cantando en el llano
  - Compay Segundo y Compay Primo
  - Mi son oriental
  - Los reyes del son
  - Los compadres
- 1956–95
  - Balcón de Santiago
  - Balcón de Santiago - Reedición
  - Saludo, Compay
- 1996–2015
  - Cien años de son
  - Son del monte
  - Yo Vengo Aquí (1996)
  - Buena Vista Social Club (World Circuit/Nonesuch Records,16 September 1997)
  - Antología (1997)
  - Lo mejor de la vida (1998)
  - Calle salud (1999)
  - Yo soy del norte
  - Grandes Éxitos (2000)
  - Antología (2001)
  - Las flores de la vida (2001)
  - Duets (2002) Anthology of Compay Segundo's duos
  - Buena Vista Social Club at Carnegie Hall (World Circuit/Nonesuch Records, 14 October 2008) (live album)
  - Lost and Found (World Circuit/Nonesuch Records, 23 March 2015) (collection of previously unreleased tracks)
