= La Lupe =

Cuban singer of boleros, guarachas and Latin soul (1936–1992)

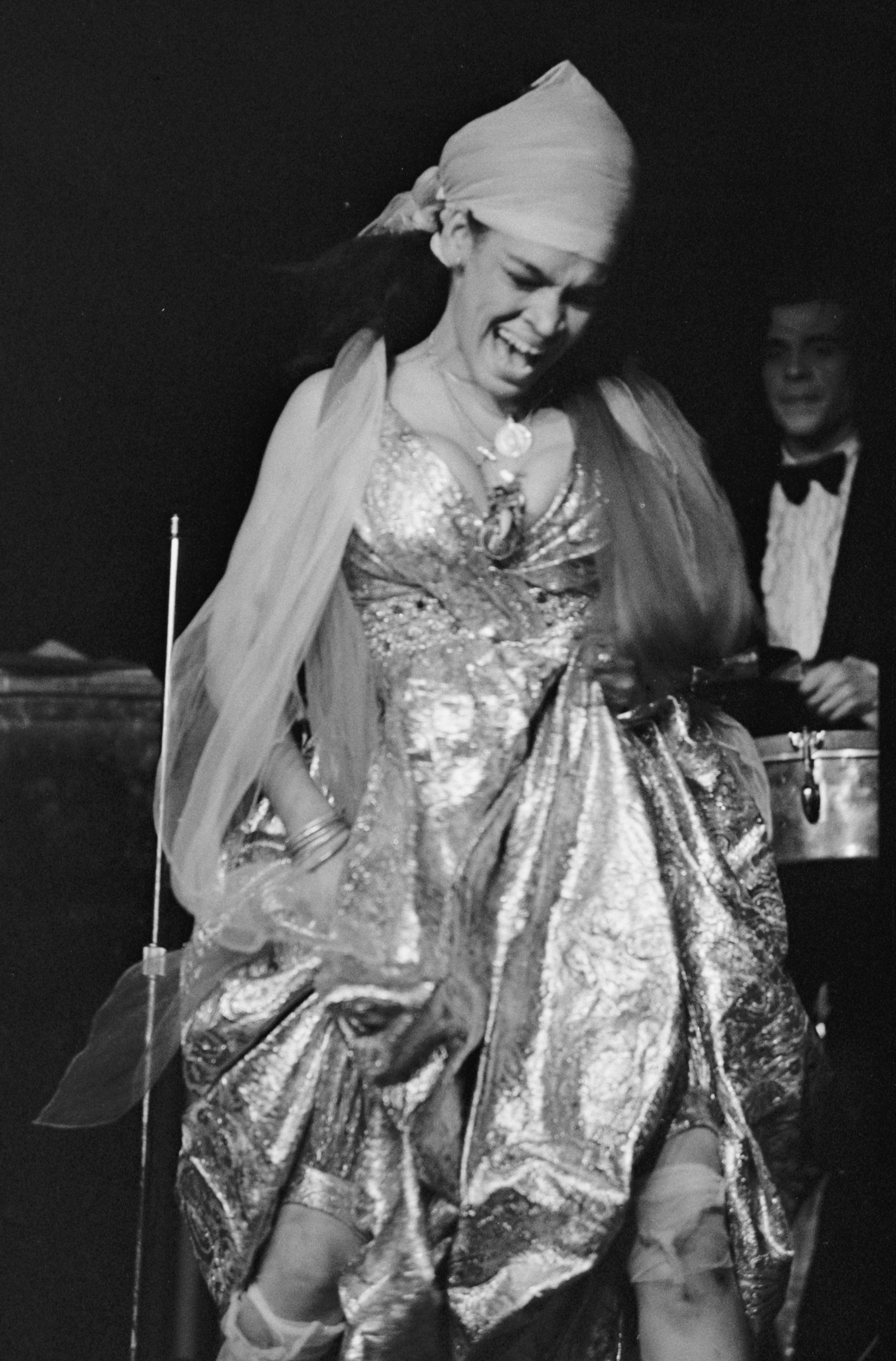
- La Lupe and her husband Guillermo García (Willie) performing at the Teatro Puerto Rico of the Bronx in 1970

Background information
- Also known as: La Yiyiyi; Queen of Latin Soul
- Born: Lupe Victoria Yolí Raimond; December 23, 1936; Santiago de Cuba, Cuba
- Died: February 29, 1992 (aged 55) Bronx, New York City, New York, U.S.
- Genres: Bolero, guaracha, Latin soul, salsa
- Occupation: Singer
- Instrument: Vocals
- Years active: 1958–1992
- Labels: Discuba, Tico
- Formerly of: Tito Puente; Mongo Santamaría

Lupe Victoria Yolí Raimond (December 23, 1936 – February 29, 1992), better known as La Lupe, was a Cuban singer of boleros, guarachas and Latin soul known for her energetic, sometimes controversial performances. Following the release of her first album in 1961, La Lupe moved from Havana to New York and signed with Tico Records, which marked the beginning of a prolific and successful career in the 1960s and 1970s. She retired in the 1980s due to religious reasons.

== Life and career ==
=== Early life and first recordings ===
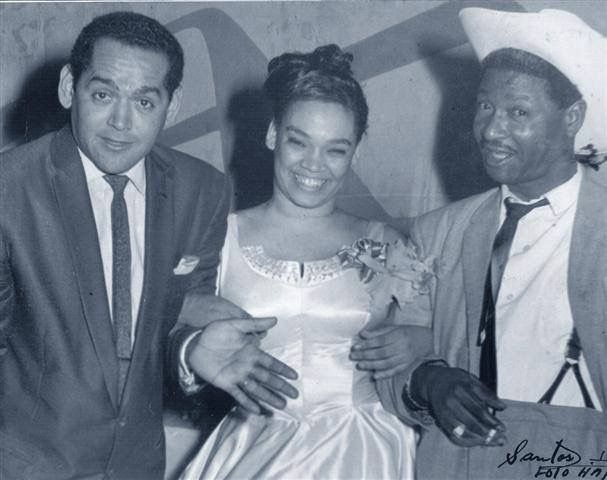
La Lupe with Pacho Alonso (left) and Benny Moré (right), c. 1959. All three were signed to the RCA Victor subsidiary Discuba.

Named after the Mexican actress, Lupe Vélez, Lupe was born in the barrio of San Pedrito in Santiago de Cuba to Tirso Yolí Michel and Paula Raimond Soler. Lupe had an older sister named Norma Yolí, named after the silent actress, Norma Talmage and a younger brother, Rafael Yolí, better known as “Tito” who was named after Mexican singer and actor Rafael Baledón. Her father was a worker at the local Bacardí distillery and a major influence on her early life. In 1945, Tirso and Paula divorced causing the introduction of her new stepmother Rosa, who treated Lupe very poorly in her childhood and as she grew older. In 1954, she participated on a radio program which invited fans to sing imitations of their favorite stars. Lupe decided to skip school to sing a bolero of Olga Guillot called "Miénteme" (Lie to Me), and won the competition. Guillot eventually wound up introducing Lupe in a program where she would later tell her “Forget Olguita Guillot, look for your style, look for your personality”. The family moved to Havana in 1955, where she was enrolled at the University of Havana to become a teacher. She admired Celia Cruz and like her, she graduated from teaching instruction before starting her professional singing career.

Lupe married in 1958 and formed a musical trio with her husband Eulogio "Yoyo" Reyes Mesías and another female singer, Tina. Another girl had been brought into the group, Olga Castillo. Lupe would be kicked out of the group soon after, also leading to the end of her marriage with Yoyo. Los Tropicuba continued as a group until Yoyo was arrested for possession of marijuana. She began to perform her own act at a small nightclub in Havana, La Red (The Net), which had a clientele of distinguished foreigners. She acquired a devoted following, which included Ernest Hemingway, Tennessee Williams, Jean-Paul Sartre, Simone de Beauvoir and Marlon Brando. She recorded her first album, Con el diablo en el cuerpo, in 1961 for Discuba, the Cuban subsidiary of RCA Victor. On the album she was backed by two different groups directed by Felipe Dulzaides and Eddy Gaytán. Her first television appearance on Puerto Rican television caused a stir due to her frenzied, vibrant performance, which reportedly shocked some viewers.

=== Exile to New York ===
In January 1962, she left Cuba alongside her representative and alleged boyfriend, Pedro Pacheco to fulfill a contract at the El Señorial, a cabaret in Mexico. She approached Celia Cruz and asked for her support to get work, and in turn, Celia recommended her to Mongo Santamaría in New York. Lupe would later travel to Miami working in various nightclubs. She collected $400 and bought a used car and traveled to New York City, Lupe performed at a cabaret named La Berraca and started a new career, making more than 10 records in five years.

=== Mainstream success ===
Lupe's passionate performances covered the range of music: son montuno, bolero, boogaloo, venturing into other Caribbean styles like Dominican merengue, Puerto Rican bomba and plena. It was her recordings which brought Tite Curet Alonso into prominence as a composer of tough-minded boleros in the salsa style. For a good part of the 1960s she was the most acclaimed Latin singer in New York City due to her partnership with Tito Puente. She did a wide variety of cover versions in either Spanish or accented English, including "My Way", "Yesterday", "Dominique" by The Singing Nun, "Twist & Shout", "Unchained Melody", "Fever" and "America" from West Side Story. Fred Weinberg, who was her favorite audio engineer, and also worked with Celia Cruz, Mongo Santamaria, Tito Puente, and many more of the Latin American greats called Lupe "a talent hurricane" in the studio due to her intense singing and enthusiasm. In October 1967, she was voted as the ‘Queen of Latin Soul’ by the people of New York in an event organized by Symphony Sid.

Lupe gained mainstream exposure through appearances on popular American television programs, including The Merv Griffin Show, The David Frost Show, The Mike Douglas Show and The Dick Cavett Show. Lupe also had concerts at the Carnegie Hall on June 14, 1969 and later on May 24, 1974 for the Tico Alegre All Stars concert. Lupe was also a frequent performer and headliner at Madison Square Garden for Richard Nader and his many successful latin festivals.

The quality of her performances became increasingly inconsistent. There were persistent rumors of a drug addiction due to her flamboyant stage presence and claims that her life was "a real earthquake" according to statements of close friends, although Fred Weinberg, who engineered and also produced a vast amount of her albums, stated that

"In all the years I worked with Lupe, not once did I ever see her on drugs, or using drugs... Heck, she never even drank liquor due to her strong belief in religion."

— Weinberg, La Lupe: Queen of Latin Soul. PBS documentary, 2007.

She ended some of her on-stage engagements being treated with an oxygen mask. Although she may have been poorly managed by her label Tico Records, once acquired by Fania Records, she managed and produced herself in mid-career, after she parted ways with Tito Puente.

Lupe was part of the cast of the Two Gentlemen of Verona musical with Raul Julia. During previews at the St. James Theatre in 1971, La Lupe consulted her padrinos (spiritual godfathers), who advised her to carry a sacred "piedra de rayo" (lightning stone) around her waist for spiritual protection. Mid-performance, the stone broke loose and flew into the orchestra pit, shattering a stage reflector lamp and causing a massive explosion that led to her immediate firing and local accusations of witchcraft. Her record executive, Tico Records president Morris Levy, quickly stepped in to suppress the incident, preventing it from spiraling into a public scandal.

=== Career decline ===
A devout follower of Santería, Lupe was crowned Ochún under the name of Okan Tomí on November 30, 1969, and continued to practice her religion. In 1974, following the successful concert of the Tico-Alegre All Stars concert, a deal was finally reached between Morris Levy and Jerry Masucci unfortunately stopping the future concerts in Miami and Puerto Rico planned by Joe Cain, general manager of Tico and Alegre Records. Her contract, along side many others with Tico Records was sold by Morris Levy after he sold the company to Jerry Masucci, owner of Fania Records. This led to the end of Lupe’s contract at the moment without renewal, yet she still had multiple appearances and performances. In 1975, Lupe had vowed to take a long break from the stage life after the birth of her second child, Rainbow García. The explosion of salsa and the return of Celia Cruz to New York were the determining factors that sent her into the background and her career declined thereafter. During this time, she also faced significant financial difficulties. Her expenses had grown substantially, partly because of her habit of purchasing expensive clothing and maintaining an extravagant lifestyle. At the same time, she was paying large sums of money for her husband's mental health treatment, which placed an additional strain on her finances. These mounting costs eventually made it difficult for her to keep up with the payments on the mansion she lived in Englewood, leaving her in an increasingly precarious financial situation. Lupe moved to Puerto Rico in April 1980 to look for new opportunities but moved back to New York in February 1983, following her mother’s return to Cuba, and found herself destitute by the mid-1980s. On New Year's Eve 1984, she injured her spine while trying to hang a curtain in her home; she initially used a wheelchair, then later a cane. In January 1985, an electrical fire made her homeless. After being healed at an evangelical Christian crusade, La Lupe abandoned her Santería roots and became a born-again Christian. In 1991, she gave a concert at La Sinagoga in New York, singing Christian songs.

=== Personal life and death ===
On September 28, 1966, she married a second time, to Cuban salsa singer Guillermo "Willie" García Jr. The couple sang various duets together on a few of her albums and in concert, he was even credited as a co-producer, coordinator and composer on some of her albums. They separated sometime in 1972, due to her husband's struggles with schizophrenia and other marital problems leading him to be institutionalized on various occasions. Yet according to various newspapers, the couple still travelled and performed together until it was no longer possible causing them to go their separate ways. Lupe died of a heart attack in 1992 at age 55, and is buried in Saint Raymond's Cemetery in the Bronx. She had two children, René Guadalupe Camaño (b. 1964 – d. 2025) and Rainbow García (b. 1975).

== Discography ==
=== Albums ===
On Tico Records, unless noted otherwise

- Con el Diablo en el Cuerpo (Discuba, 1961)
- La Lupe is Back (Discuba, 1962)
- Mongo Introduces La Lupe (Riverside, 1963, with Mongo Santamaria)
- Tito Puente Swings, The Exciting Lupe Sings (1965, with Tito Puente)
- Tú y Yo (1965 with Tito Puente)
- Homenaje a Rafael Hernández 1966 (with Tito Puente)
- La Lupe y su Alma Venezolana 1966
- A Mí Me Llaman La Lupe 1966 with arrangements by Chico O'Farrill
- The King and I 1967 (with Tito Puente)
- Two Sides of La Lupe 1968
- Queen of Latin Soul 1968
- La Lupe's Era 1968
- The Queen Does Her Own Thing (Roulette, 1969)
- La Lupe Es La Reina, La Lupe the Queen 1969
- Definitely La Yi Yi Yi 1969
- That Genius Called the Queen 1970
- La Lupe en Madrid 1971
- Stop! I'm Free Again.. 1972
- ¿Pero Cómo Va Ser? 1973
- Un Encuentro con La Lupe 1974 (with Curet Alonso)
- One of a Kind 1977
- La Pareja 1978 (with Tito Puente)
- En Algo Nuevo 1980 (last album with Tico Records)

==== Christian albums ====
On Rincón Cristiano Distribution, unless noted otherwise

- La Samaritana 1986 (King Music)
- Te Amo Porque Me Amastes Primero 1987
- La Lupe en Cristo 1989
- Dios No Es Hombre Para Que Mienta 1989

=== Compilations ===
- Lo Mejor de La Lupe 1974
- Apasionada 1978
- Too Much! 1989. Compilation of Tico recordings only, issued by Charly Records (HOT 123)
- Dance with the Queen 2008
- Greatest Hits 2010
- Anthology 2012 [2-CD]

=== Hit singles ===
Short list of her best-known songs, taken from Giro Radamés' Diccionario enciclopédico de la música en Cuba and compilation albums:

- "Con el Diablo en el Cuerpo"
- "Fiebre"
- "Crazy Heart"
- "Qué te Pedí" [Tico SLP 1121]
- "Adiós" [Tico SLP 1121]
- "La Tirana" [Tico SLP 1167]
- "Carcajada Final" [Tico SLP 1176]
- "Puro teatro" [Tico SLP 1192]
- "A Beny Moré" [Tico CLP 1310]

== In popular culture ==
- Pedro Almodóvar's Women on the Verge of a Nervous Breakdown ends with La Lupe's "Puro Teatro".
- Her recording of La Virgen Lloraba was used in the 1996 film The Birdcage.
- In 1964, cultural critic Susan Sontag explicitly named La Lupe as a premier example of the camp aesthetic in her landmark essay "Notes on 'Camp'".
- In 2002, New York City renamed East 140th Street in The Bronx as La Lupe Way in her memory.
- Cuban-American writer Daína Chaviano pays homage to La Lupe in the novel The Island of Eternal Love (Riverhead-Penguin, 2008), where the singer appears in a cameo singing Puro Teatro.
- On the TV series RuPaul's Drag Race: All Stars, Puerto Rican drag queen Nina Flowers chose to impersonate La Lupe.
- Her recording of "Fever" was included in the episode "Angels of Death," from season two of the Starz series Magic City.
- A poem by Víctor Hernández Cruz was written about her: "La Lupe".
- In 1991, comedian Sandra Bernhard released a track called "La Lupe" on her album Excuses for Bad Behavior, Part #1, spoken in Spanish and English, in which Bernhard briefly speaks of the dissolution of the La Lupe/Tito Puente relationship.
- In 2015, an analogous and fictionalized version of La Lupe (renamed Lola Calvo for the series), was heavily featured in an 80 episode Spanish-language biographical television series of Celia Cruz called Celia, on the Telemundo network.
- In 2017, the first episode of TNT's Claws is titled "Tirana" and in it the main characters lip-sync and dance to one of La Lupe's signature songs.
- In 2002, her song "Que te Pedí" was featured in the film Empire.
- La Lupe's signature song, "Que te Pedí", was featured in the 2006 film, El Cantante, starring Marc Anthony as Hector Lavoe.
- In 2020, Colombian singer Kali Uchis added a cover of "Que te Pedi" in her album Sin Miedo (Del amor y otros demonios)

=== Film & theatre ===
- La Gran Tirana by Carlos Padrón - Cuba, 2011. Havana at Humboldt House, Ulm at Theater in der Westentasche, Theater Days in Karlsruhe, Cuban Embassy in Berlin. Starring: Nancy Calero - Germany.
- La Lupe: My Life, My Destiny - theatrical production by Carmen Rivera (2001)
- La Lupe: Queen of Latin Soul - film by Ela Troyano (2003; 2007)
- La Reina, La Lupe by Rafael Albertori (2003)

== See also ==
- List of Afro-Latinos
