= Havana Jam =

Music festival in Havana, Cuba

- Genre: Cuban music, jazz fusion, Latin jazz, pop, descarga
- Dates: 2–4 March 1979
- Locations: Karl Marx Theatre, Havana, Cuba
- Years active: 1979
- Founders: Bruce Lundvall, Jerry Masucci, Cuban Ministry of Culture

Havana Jam (Spanish: Mermelada de La Habana) was a three-day music festival that took place at the Karl Marx Theatre in Havana, Cuba, from March 2 to March 4, 1979. The event was sponsored by Bruce Lundvall, the president of Columbia Records, Jerry Masucci, the president of Fania Records, and the Cuban Ministry of Culture.

The festival also included American acts such as Weather Report, the CBS Jazz All-Stars, the Trio of Doom, Fania All-Stars, Stephen Stills, Billy Swan, Bonnie Bramlett, Mike Finnigan, Kris Kristofferson, Tony Williams, Jaco Pastorius, John McLaughlin, Rita Coolidge, and Billy Joel, as well as Cuban acts by Irakere, Pacho Alonso, Zaida Arrate, Elena Burke, Orquesta de Santiago de Cuba, Conjunto Yaguarimú, Frank Emilio Flynn, Juan Pablo Torres, Los Papines, Tata Güines, Cuban Percussion Ensemble, Sara González, Pablo Milanés, Manguaré, and Orquesta Aragón.

== History ==
=== Background and planning ===
In 1977, U.S. President Jimmy Carter and Cuban President Fidel Castro started to loosen the political tension between the two countries and opened Interest Sections both in Havana and Washington, D.C. It was the first time in almost two decades after Castro's rise to power that there was a real interest in establishing a normalization of diplomatic relations and the lifting of the United States embargo against Cuba.

In April 1978, CBS Records director Bruce Lundvall, together with a group of the company's music enthusiasts, made a four-day trip to Havana, where they took great interest to Cuban music, and especially to Afro-Cuban jazz band Irakere.

After months of discussion, Lundvall signed Irakere and in July the group traveled to New York to perform an unannounced guest set at the famed Newport Jazz Festival-New York. Rave reviews led to an invitation from the prestigious Montreux Jazz Festival in Switzerland.

A few months later, Irakere won their first Grammy with the album Irakere, recorded at their Montreux Jazz Festival and Newport Jazz Festival performances. Then, in the Fall of 1978, he joined forces with Fania Records director Jerry Masucci and convinced the Cuban cultural authorities to organize a three-day festival in Havana with the participation of Cuban and American musicians. The event would be recorded and televised for the enjoyment of both the Cuban and American people.

This event, spontaneously titled Havana Jam, was set for March 2 through 4, 1979. For assistance in the planning of the event, Lundvall brought aboard Jock McLean and Phil Sandhaus of Columbia's artists development department, who then enlisted Showco (a Dallas-based concert production company) and Studio Instrument Rentals to help organize the event.

By early February, Lundvall and his team had organized the roster for the event. Representing the U.S. would be Billy Joel, Stephen Stills, Weather Report, Kris Kristofferson with Rita Coolidge, the Fania All-Stars and the CBS Jazz All-Stars, a group conceptualized by Lundvall which was scheduled to feature more than 20 top jazz artists on the label.

As the event came closer, other CBS Records personnel began working to organize it. Rehearsals were scheduled for the CBS Jazz All-Stars, travel accommodations were made, equipment was rented, a wide cross-section of media was invited, and both recording and videotaping plans were confirmed.

Record producers Bert DeCoteaux and Mike Berniker flew down with a crew from the CBS Recording Studios along with a support team and mobile 24-track Recording Studio from Record Plant NY.

The musicians landed at the José Martí airport on March 1.

Havana Jam was an invitation-only event, with mostly cultural personalities and members of the Communist Party and their children in attendance, though some students from different art and music schools were also invited.

The festival was hardly mentioned in the Cuban press, and thirty years later, not many Cubans knew it ever existed.

=== The festival ===
==== Friday, 2 March 1979 ====
With the hall filled to capacity, Weather Report opened the show, offering an assortment of sound effects before launching into their set. The audience repeatedly rose to its feet during the program, setting the festival's prevailing mood of "music over politics". Backstage, Weather Report's members (Joe Zawinul, Wayne Shorter, Jaco Pastorius and Peter Erskine) were later congratulated by an assortment of Cuban musicians and fans, most of whom were familiar with the group's repertoire through the aid of Florida radio, mostly AM stations such as WQAM, WGBS, WKWF and WLCY.

Weather Report was followed by two traditional Cuban ensembles of differing styles. The first, Conjunto Yaguarimú, featured vocalists Zaida Arrate and Pacho Alonso, who interpreted "dated" Cuban music. The second group, Orquesta Aragón, played some of the most dynamic music of the festival, utilizing its Charanga sound of violins, cello, flute, and rhythm section.

The concert was going later than expected, and people began to leave the hall because of the midnight public transportation curfew. Hence, when the Fania All-Stars took the stage, the house was half empty. Their ensemble included salsa artists such as Rubén Blades, Johnny Pacheco, Pete Rodríguez, Héctor Lavoe, Larry Harlow, Santos Colón, Luigi Texidor, Pupi Legarreta, Papo Lucca, Roberto Roena, Adalberto Santiago, Sal Cuevas, Wilfrido Vargas, and more.

==== Saturday, 3 March 1979 ====
Leading off Saturday evening's entertainment was the first grouping of the CBS Jazz All-Stars, composed of Dexter Gordon, Stan Getz, Jimmy Heath, Arthur Blythe, Woody Shaw, Hubert Laws, Bobby Hutcherson, Willie Bobo, Cedar Walton, Percy Heath and Tony Williams.

The stage was then turned over to the Trio of Doom, comprising luminaries John McLaughlin, Jaco Pastorius, and Tony Williams. As a finale, a third ensemble came onstage: Blythe, Jimmy Heath, Laws, Bobo, Richard Tee, Rodney Franklin, Eric Gale, John Lee and Gerry Brown. Although their set was limited to two selections, the assemblage was also well received.

What followed was considered the highlight of the festival, the 25-member Cuban Percussion Ensemble. The entourage featured some of the biggest names in modern Cuban drumming, such as Tata Güines, Los Papines, Guillermo Barreto and Changuito, backed by pianist Frank Emilio and his quartet.

After a percussion set, Cuba was treated to its first taste of rock 'n' roll by Stephen Stills. He performed a high-energy set that featured a band that included Bonnie Bramlett and Mike Finnigan. Stills gave a sampling of his various popular songs, and then jumped into the audience and sang a salute to the audience entitled Cuba Al Fin.

Irakere then closed the show. The group was joined by Rodney Franklin, Richard Tee, John McLaughlin, Willie Bobo, Stan Getz, Jaco Pastorius and others, then bringing the evening's proceedings to an abrupt halt at 3 A.M.

==== Sunday, 4 March 1979 ====
Leading off Sunday evening's performances was trombone player Juan Pablo Torres, followed by Cuban singer Elena Burke. Appearing next on the bill were Kris Kristofferson and Rita Coolidge, backed by a band composed of Billy Swan and other musicians. Kristofferson performed first, singing many of his popular songs. Rita Coolidge then took the stage. Then, Sara González sang several numbers accompanied by Pablo Milanés y Grupo Manguaré. Then came the festival's finale, Billy Joel. Unlike most of the other acts, Joel's performance was not recorded or videotaped.

=== Aftermath ===
In 1979, Columbia released two double albums of the festival performances, Havana Jam and Havana Jam 2. The Fania All-Stars's set was released later that year as Havana Jam on Fania. The Trio of Doom performance was released in 2007 as Trio of Doom.

The event is recollected and revived in Ernesto Juan Castellanos's 2009 documentary Havana Jam '79.

== See also ==
- List of historic rock festivals
- Woodstock festival
- Monterey Pop Festival
