= Bruce Lundvall =

American record company executive (1935–2015)

Bruce Lundvall (September 13, 1935 – May 19, 2015) was an American record company executive, best known for his period as the president and CEO of the Blue Note Label Group, reporting directly to Eric Nicoli, the Chief Executive Officer of EMI Group.

== Career ==
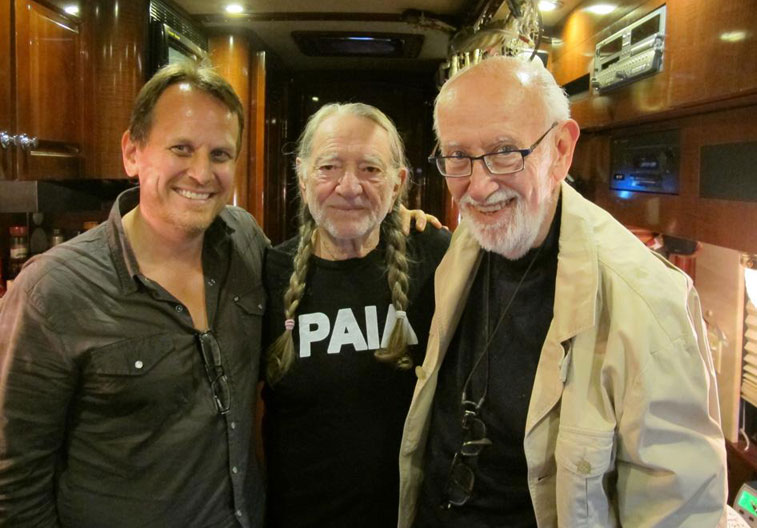
Bruce Lundvall (r), Willie Nelson and ArtistShare founder Brian Camelio on Willie's tour bus.

In a career spanning half a century, Bruce Lundvall signed a wide array of artists, including Willie Nelson, Herbie Hancock, Dexter Gordon, Woody Shaw, James Taylor, Stan Getz, Wynton Marsalis, Dianne Reeves, Richard Marx, Natalie Cole, Cassandra Wilson, Anita Baker, and Norah Jones. He headed the following labels: Blue Note Records (jazz), Angel Records (classical), and Manhattan Records (adult pop).

Lundvall began his music career in marketing at Columbia Records where he remained for 21 years, becoming President of the domestic division of CBS Records in 1976. In 1974 he gave the green light to Bruce Springsteen's breakthrough album Born to Run, after hearing the song of the same name.

In 1979, Bruce Lundvall organized and sponsored in Havana, Cuba, the Havana Jam festival that took place between 2–4 March, with Kris Kristofferson, Rita Coolidge, Stephen Stills, the CBS Jazz All-Stars, the Trio of Doom, Fania All-Stars, Billy Swan, Bonnie Bramlett, Mike Finnigan, Weather Report, and Billy Joel, plus an array of Cuban artists such as Irakere, Pacho Alonso, Tata Güines, and Orquesta Aragón. Their performances are captured on Ernesto Juan Castellanos's documentary Havana Jam '79, and on the two Columbia albums Havana Jam and Havana Jam II.

Lundvall joined Elektra in 1982, where he became President of Elektra Records and the newly created Elektra/Musician Jazz label.

In 1984, he was approached with an offer to create Manhattan, a pop music label based on the East Coast, for EMI, as well as to revive the suspended Blue Note jazz label. Lundvall accepted the challenge and steered the label for a quarter of a century. He was responsible for signing an unknown Norah Jones. Jones's debut Come Away With Me, and her subsequent albums, have sold in their millions internationally. Lundvall stood down as President of Blue Note in 2010. In January 2012, Don Was became President of Blue Note, having been appointed CEO the previous year, with Lundvall becoming Chairman Emeritus.

== Personal life ==
Lundvall was born in Englewood, New Jersey. A resident of Wyckoff, New Jersey, until he relocated to a nearby residential facility, Lundvall was married to his wife Kay and had three sons. He died of complications from a prolonged battle with Parkinson's disease on May 19, 2015, in Wyckoff.

== Awards ==
- 1996 — Lifetime Achievement Award from the Jazz Foundation of America
- 1998 — Down Beat Lifetime Achievement Award
- 2004 — MIDEM Personality of the Year Award
- 2012 — UCLA Gershwin Award
