= Superimposition (album) =

Studio album by Eddie Palmieri
- Released: 1970
- Recorded: 1969
- Genre: Salsa, descarga, Latin jazz
- Length: 36:10
- Label: Tico
- Producer: Miguel Estivill

Eddie Palmieri chronology
| Justicia (1969) | Superimposition (1970) | Vamonos Pa'l Monte (1971) |

Superimposition is the twelfth studio album by American pianist Eddie Palmieri. It was released by Tico Records in 1970. The album combines modern salsa renditions of Cuban standards on side A with experimental descargas (jam sessions) on side B. Since its release, the album has been praised by critics such as John Storm Roberts for its innovative approach.

== Background and recording ==
Throughout the 1960s, pianist Eddie Palmieri played an important role in the development of salsa with his conjunto La Perfecta. La Perfecta was one of the first Latin ensembles to feature multiple trombones, one of salsa's distinctive characteristics. The band's repertoire was inspired by Cuban and Puerto Rican dance-oriented styles such as guaracha, son, pachanga and bomba. In 1968, Palmieri disbanded La Perfecta in order to seek a more experimental approach incorporating funk and soul elements into his music. Palmieri and his new ensemble (still similar to La Perfecta, with Barry Rogers being replaced by Lewis Kahn) recorded a series of four albums for Tico that have been said to contain his "best sounding" work. These four albums were Champagne (1968), Justicia (1969), Superimposition (1970) and Vámonos pa'l monte (1971).

Despite his experimental approach, most of his recordings remained largely based on the basic structures of son montuno, as exemplified by "(Se acabó) la malanga" and "(Dame un cachito) pa' huele" on Superimposition. The former was written by Rudy Calzado specifically for this album, whereas the latter is an Arsenio Rodríguez composition from 1946. A rendition of Guillermo Rodríguez Fiffe's "Bilongo" (a guaracha written in 1937) closes side A, and is considered together with "La malanga" as one of the "most representative [tracks] of the hard-core Palmieri salsa style". In addition, "Bilongo" has been described as "one of the most important salsa-era recordings to feature the soloing of Armenteros".

The recordings present in side B are instrumental descargas (Latin jam sessions). Particularly important is the presence of Alfredo "Chocolate" Armenteros, who had also taken part in the recording of 1950s descarga sessions with artists such as Tojo and Chico O'Farrill's All-Stars Cubano. Unlike older descargas, Palmieri combines modal phrases and montuno patterns, and adds "harmonically advanced chord voicings, substitutions and alterations" to his guajeos. The title of the last track on the album, "17.1", corresponds to the average age of the percussion section.

Fania Records (owner of the Tico Records catalogue) re-issued the album on CD in 2006.

== Reception ==
Professional ratings
Review scores
| Source | Rating |
|---|---|
| AllMusic | 4.5/5 stars |

John Storm Roberts wrote a laudatory review in which he praised Palmieri's improvisatory and innovative style, particularly the way in which he "mixes offbeat montunos with unconventional chords, expressionism, and straight jazz, in blends different from any other jazz or Latin pianist". AllMusic awarded the album 4.5 starts out of 5.

The album's artwork by Ely Besalel has been described as a "layered, abstract collage work" and has received positive reviews.

== Track listing ==
Side A
| No. | Title | Writer(s) | Length |
|---|---|---|---|
| 1. | "La malanga" | Rudy Calzado | 4:25 |
| 2. | "Pa' huele" | Arsenio Rodríguez | 4:35 |
| 3. | "Bilongo" | Guillermo Rodríguez Fiffe | 6:00 |

Side B
| No. | Title | Writer(s) | Length |
|---|---|---|---|
| 1. | "Qué lindo eso, eh!" | Eddie Palmieri | 7:43 |
| 2. | "Chocolate Ice Cream" | Alfredo "Chocolate" Armenteros / Eddie Palmieri | 6:12 |
| 3. | "17.1" | Eddie Palmieri | 7:20 |

== Personnel ==
According to original album sleeve.

Eddie Palmieri & His Orchestra

- Eddie Palmieri – piano
- Ismael Quintana – vocals
- Arturo Campa – chorus
- Justo Betancourt – chorus
- Elliot Romero – chorus
- José Rodrigues – trombone
- Lewis Kahn – trombone
- Alfredo "Chocolate" Armenteros – trumpet
- Nicky Marrero – timbales
- Eladio Pérez – conga drums
- Tommy "Choki" López – bongo drums
- Manny Oquendo – timbales, bongo drums (invited guest)
- Roberto Franquiz – bell
- Rudy Calzado – percussion

Technical

- Miguel Estivill – producer, coordinator
- Fred Weinberg – engineer
