= Saoco =

Saoco is a type of Cuban rum with coconut water.

Saoco may also refer to:

- Saoco (band), Cuban-style conjunto from New York
- "Saoco", 1954 song written by Rosendo Ruiz Jr., recorded by Celia Cruz with Sonora Matancera, Conjunto Libre and others
- "Saoco", 1958 song written by singer Pellín Rodríguez, recorded by Cortijo y su Combo
- "Saoco", 1971 song written by Armando Peraza, recorded by Mongo Santamaría
- "Saoco" (Wisin song), 2004 song by Wisin featuring Daddy Yankee
- "Saoko", 2022 song by Rosalía
- "Mi saoco", 1955 song by Benny Moré
