= Fredesvinda García =

Fredelina García Herrera, known always as Freddy (11 November 1934 in Havana – 31 July 1961 in San Juan, Puerto Rico) was a Cuban female singer of high quality.

== Biography ==
She was born in on November 11th, 1934 in El Cerro, a municipality in Havana, to parents Justo García and Manuela Herrera. She sang a cappella in clubs in Havana and recorded only one album before her death from a heart attack in San Juan. Her weight (over 300lbs) gave a very distinctive, androgynous sound to her voice. She was, almost entirely, a singer of boleros and canciones.

At the age of 12, she became a cook for the family of Arturo Bengochea, who was the president of the Cuban League of Professional Base-Ball, but she soon found herself singing nights at the Bar Celeste, on Humboldt and Infanta Streets, a place where artists used to meet. She was spotted by the director of the Hotel Capri's casino and given a contract. She opened at the Cabaret Capri with orchestration by Rafael Somavilla in the review Piminta y Sal (pepper & salt) with other singers, dancers, and a quartet led by pianist Carlos Faxas. Freddy appeared in several key TV programs, like Jueves de Partagas (1959), which she remembered dearly. On that show she appeared with Benny Moré and Celia Cruz.

Freddy traveled to Venezuela and then on to Mexico with a company led by dancer and choreographer Roderyco Neyra (Rodney). From there, she flew, along with others, to Miami and then to Puerto Rico. She got several contracts and was even presented on San Juan TV.

Freddy would die at 4:00pm on July 31 1961 at the Women’s Hospital of Santurce, According to Freddy’s death certificate she had died from Congestive Heart Failure due to Hypertension and Obesity. She was buried in the Santa María Magdalena de Pazzis Cemetery in August of 1961. According to Bobby Collazo, Freddy left behind a 9 year old daughter, Grisel, who still resides in Havana, in the care of one of her close friends, María Sánchez.

== In popular culture ==
She appears as Estrella Rodrigues in Guillermo Cabrera Infante's book about Havana's nightlife during the years of the Revolution, Tres tristes tigres (published in English as Three Trapped Tigers) (1966). Portions of this, featuring Freddy predominantly, were later republished as Ella cantaba boleros.

She also appears in the novel The Island of Eternal Love by Daína Chaviano (2006).

== Discography ==
Her only album is known variously as La voz del sentimento or Ella cantaba boleros. It was recorded in 1960 for Puchito Records under the reference: Puchito MLP 552. Humberto Suarez did the musical arrangements and conducted the orchestra.

- "El hombre que yo amo," ("The man I love"), by George Gershwin
- "Tengo," by Marta Valdes (de)
- "La cita," by Gabriel Ruiz (composer)
- "Noche y Dia" ("Night and Day"), by Cole Porter
- "Vivamos hoy," by Wilfredo Riquelme
- "Freddy" by Ela O'Farril (specially written for her)
- "Noche de ronda," by Agustín Lara
- "Tengo que decirte," by Rafael Pedraza
- "Debi Llorar," by Piloto y Vera
- "Sombras y mas sombras," by Humberto Suarez
- "Gracias mi amor," by Jesus Faneity
- "Bésame Mucho," by Consuelo Velázquez

ASIN: B000009RPF (Ella Cantaba Boleros)
ASIN: B00008EPKE (La Voz Del Sentimento)

Listen to extracts of the recording.

== "Freddy", the song ==
Lyrics of the song specially written for her by Ela O'Farril.

"Freddy"

Soy una mujer que canta
Para mitigar las penas
De las horas vividas y perdidas. Me queda sólo esto:
Decirle a la noche,
Todo lo que yo siento,
Cantando canciones;
Despierto ilusiones
Dormidas en mí.

Muchos me vieron
Caminando a solas
Bajo las luces
Desiertas y azules de mi soledad.

¿Qué fue mi vida desde siempre?
Sólo trabajo y miseria,
Por eso cantaba a las estrellas
Y quizás me oyó hasta Dios.

Soy una mujer que canta
Para mitigar las penas.
No era nada ni nadie y ahora,
Dicen que soy una estrella,
Que me convertí en una de ellas
Para brillar en la eterna noche.

Soy una mujer que canta
Para mitigar las penas.
No era nada ni nadie y ahora,
Dicen que soy una estrella,
Que me convertí en una de ellas
Para brillar en la eterna noche.

Rough translation:
I am a woman who sings to soften the sufferings of the vivid and lost hours. This is all I have left: Telling the night all that I feel, singing songs; lively illusions asleep in me. Many saw me walking alone under the lights empty and blue of my solitude. What has my life always been like? Only work and misery; this is why I sing to the stars and perhaps God will hear me.
I am a woman who sings to soften the sufferings. There was nothing and no one and now, they say I am a star; that I turned myself into one of those to shine in the eternal night.
I am a woman who sings to soften the sufferings. There was nothing and no one and now, they say I am a star; that I turned myself into one of those to shine in the eternal night. (translated by wikieditor)
