= René Lorente =

- Born: 27 November 1948; Havana, Cuba
- Genres: Son cubano; chachachá; guaracha; danzón; instrumental music
- Occupations: Musician; songwriter
- Instruments: Bohem flute; five-key flute; tercerola in Eb
- Years active: 1964–present
- Labels: EGREM; Hamelin; WEA Latin Mojito; Regu

René Lorente (born 27 November 1948 in Havana, Cuba) is a Cuban-American musician and composer, recognized for having been a member of the Orquesta Aragón, for his solo career and for his collaboration with musicians such as Senén Suárez, Enrique Jorrín, Meme Solís, Cachao López, Chucho Valdés and Albita Rodríguez, among others.

During his career he has performed in genres like son cubano, chachachá, danzón, guaracha and instrumental music, and has excelled in the execution of instruments such as the five key wooden flute, the tercerola in Eb and the Böehm flute.

== Biography ==
=== Beginnings and studies ===
Lorente was born in Havana, Cuba on 27 November 1948. In his childhood, he began studying the five key wooden flute with the renowned flutist Antonio Arcaño, and at the age of fourteen he was already performing live with orchestras in the city. Between 1964 and 1968 he studied at the Alejandro García Caturla Conservatory, where he learned to play the Böehm flute. In 1969 he continued his musical training at the Escuela de Superación Profesional under the tutelage of maestro Alfredo Portela López.

Specializing in popular cuban genres such as guaracha, son, chachachá and danzón, that same year he joined Ninón Mondéjar's Orquesta América as a professional flutist, where he remained for eleven years. In 1980 he began a collaboration with composer and arranger Senén Suárez, joining his combo and participating in the recording of the album El Combo de Senén Suárez. Around the same time he substituted in some performances for flutist Miguel O'Farrill during the season of the Enrique Jorrín Orchestra's show Cabaret at the Hotel Capri.

=== Orquesta Aragón ===
In the mid-1970s, Rafael Lay, director of Orquesta Aragón, suggested to Lorente the possibility of filling in as a substitute in the group in case of any eventuality. Finally, in 1984 he became an official member of the orchestra, replacing flutist Richard Egües, who had joined the group in 1955. In total, Lorente participated in the recording of five albums with the orchestra: Baila con La Aragón, Recordando a Rafael Lay, Orquesta Aragón con el Maestro Labba Soseh and the Álbum de Oro 50 Aniversario in its volumes one and two.

=== Solo career and other projects ===
In August 1990 he settled in the United States, where he formed his own charanga orchestra. Two years later he recorded the album René Lorente y su charanga cubana, and in 1995 he decided to start a career as a solo instrumentalist exploring other genres like Latin jazz, pop, rock and African rhythms. During that period he also collaborated as a guest artist with various charangas, and at the end of the 1990s he joined the group Café Nostalgia in the city of Miami, with which he recorded the albums Live (1997) and Te di la vida entera (1999).

Parallel to his work as a solo musician, with which he has recorded albums for Hamelin Records and WEA Latin, for more than two decades he has occupied the position of flutist in the group of pianist Enrique Chía. Throughout his career, Lorente has recorded or performed with artists and groups like Hansel Martínez, Fred Paul, Albita Rodríguez, Meme Solís, Juanito Márquez, Juan Pablo Torres, Cachao López, Haitiando, Roberto Torres, Chucho Valdés, Alfredo Armenteros, César Pedroso, Grupo Canela and Su Majestad el Danzón, and has appeared on television programs on networks such as Telemundo, América TeVe, Univision and MegaTV.

== Discography ==
=== Solo ===
- 1992 – René Lorente y su charanga cubana
- 2003 – Madera y metal
- 2004 – Concepto en flauta
- 2007 – Algo diferente

=== With Orquesta Aragón ===
- 1985 – Laba Sosseh con la Orquesta Aragón
- 1987 – Baila con Aragón
- 1987 – Recordando a Rafael Lay
- 1989 – 50 años de oro Vol. 1 y 2
- 1996 – Éxitos de la Orquesta Aragón

=== With other artists ===
- 1979 – Orquesta América (Orquesta América)
- 1982 – El combo de Senén Suárez (El combo de Senén Suárez)
- 1990 – El gato (Hansel Martínez)
- 1996 – Éxitos de la Orquesta de Enrique Jorrín (Enrique Jorrín)
- 1996 – Éxitos de la Orquesta América (Orquesta América)
- 1996 – Cuban Masters All Stars (Various artists)
- 1997 – Live (Grupo Café Nostalgia)
- 1998 – Ritmos de mi Cuba (Enrique Chía)
- 1999 – Te di la vida entera (Grupo Café Nostalgia)
- 1999 – Haitiando Vol. 1 (Haitiando)
- 2000 – Haitiando Vol. 2 (Haitiando)
- 2001 – La música de Ernesto Lecuona (Enrique Chía)
- 2001 – Haitiando Vol. 3 (Haitiando)
- 2002 – Nuestra navidad (Enrique Chía)
- 2002 – Enrique Chía en vivo y su público (Enrique Chía)
- 2002 – Lolelolay Vol. 1 y 2 (Haitiando)
- 2003 – Sones y tradiciones (Enrique Chía)
- 2004 – Con mucho swing (Chachachá All Stars)
- 2005 – Agustín Lara, su alma y su piano (Enrique Chía)
- 2007 – Mi cielo tropical (Enrique Chía)
- 2007 – A solas contigo (Meme Solís)
- 2008 – Cuba, un viaje musical (Various artists)
- 2009 – Creolatino (Various artists)
- 2013 – Soy latino (Various artists)
