= Mongo Introduces La Lupe =

Studio album by La Lupe, Mongo Santamaria Orchestra
- Released: 1963
- Genres: Latin jazz, guaguanco
- Label: Riverside
- Producer: Orrin Keepnews

La Lupe chronology
La Lupe is Back (1962)	Mongo Introduces La Lupe (1963)	Tito Puente Swings, The Exciting Lupe Sings (1965)

Mongo Santamaria Orchestra chronology
Mongo at the Village Gate (1963)	Mongo Introduces La Lupe (1963)	El Pussy Cat (1965)

Mongo Introduces La Lupe is an album by La Lupe and the Mongo Santamaria Orchestra. It was recorded at the Plaza Sound Studios in New York City and released by Riverside Records in 1963. AllMusic gave the album a rating of four stars. Reviewer Scott Yanow called it "an excellent set of stirring Afro-Cuban jazz."

In a 2024 ranking by music critics of the 600 greatest Latin albums, "Mongo Introduces La Lupe" was ranked No. 110.

== Track listing ==
Side A

1. "Besito Pa Ti" (Santamaria) [4:39]
2. "Kiniqua" (Antar Daly) [4:19]
3. "Canta Bajo" (Pat Patrick) [3:35]
4. "Uncle Calypso" (Armando Peraza) [3:27]
5. "Montuneando" (Santamaria, Hernandez) [4:01]

Side B

1. "Que Lindas Son" (Santamaria) [4:38]
2. "Oye Este Guaguanco" (Isaac Irrizary) [2:45]
3. "Este Mambo (This Is My Mambo)" (Rene Hernandez) [4:39]
4. "Quiet Stroll" (Pat Patrick) [7:59]

== Credits ==
- Lupe Yolí - vocals (tracks: A1, A3, A5, B2, B3)
- Mongo Santamaria - conga and bongo drums
- Marty Sheller - trumpet
- "Chocolate" Armenteros - trumpet (tracks: A5, B1)
- Bobby Capers - flute, saxophone
- Pat Patrick - flute, saxophone
- Victor Venegas - bass
- Rene Hernandez - piano
- Rodgers Grant - piano (tracks: A4, B4)
- Frank Valerino - Latin percussion
- Kako - Latin percussion
- Osvaldo Martinez - Latin percussion
