= Definitely La Yi Yi Yi =

Studio album by La Lupe
- Released: 1969
- Studios: A&R Studios
- Genres: Latin soul, son montuno, Afro-Cuban jazz, guaracha, bolero, bomba
- Label: Tico
- Producers: Lupe Yolí, Guillermo “Willie” Garcia

La Lupe chronology
La Lupe Es La Reina/ La Lupe The Queen (1969)	Definitely La Yi Yi Yi (1969)	That Genius Called the Queen (1970)

Definitely La Yi Yi Yi, also known as Definitivamente La Yi Yi Yi, is an album by La Lupe. It was released by Tico Records in 1969.

Professional reviews
Review scores
Source	Rating
AllMusic	4/5 stars

== Track listing ==
Side A

1. "Fijense" (C. Curet Alonso) [2:26]
2. "Miedo" (R. de Leon) [2:35]
3. "Silencio" (Rasso, Brezza, Ballay, Cadalso) [3:14]
4. "Quisqueya" (Rafael Hernandez) [2:21]
5. "Avanaza y Vete de Aqui" (C. Curet Alonso) [2:10]

Side B

1. "Toitica Tuya" (J. Vazquez) [2:15]
2. "A Borinquen" (R. Velez) [2:12]
3. "Si Tu No Vienes" (Lupe Yoli) [3:12]
4. "La Virgen Lloraba" (Lupe Yoli) [2:07]
5. "Saraycoco" (Lupe Yoli) [3:00]
