= Queen of Latin Soul =

Studio album by La Lupe
- Released: 1968
- Genres: Bolero, cha-cha-chá, boogaloo, salsa, merengue
- Label: Tico
- Producer: Pancho Cristal

La Lupe chronology
La Lupe’s Era (1968)	Queen of Latin Soul (1968)	The Queen Does Her Own Thing (1969)

Queen of Latin Soul, also known as Reina De La Cancion Latina, is an album by La Lupe. It was released by Tico Records in 1968 (catalog no. LP-1167). The album was produced by Pancho Cristal and arranged and conducted by Hector de Leon. The liner notes were written by her former husband, Cuban salsa singer Guillermo "Willie" Garcia.

The album included La Lupe's hit version of the song, "Fever". On the web site NBC New York Elizabeth Bougerol called it one of the best versions and essential at boogaloo parties.

== Track listing ==
Side A

1. "Amor Gitano" (Hector Flores Osuna) [2:55]
2. "La Tirana" (A. Curet Alonso) [3:03]
3. "Aun" (Ramon Marrero) [2:15]
4. "Tu Me Niegas" (J. B. Tarraza) [3:45]
5. "Negrura" (Luis Cisneros) [2:35]

Side B

1. "Fever" (John Davenport, Eddie Cooley) [2:38]
2. "Este Ritmo Sabroson" (Wm. Garcia) [1:46]
3. "Busamba" (A. Curet Alonso) [2:50]
4. "Soy Sonerita" (Lupe Yoli) [2:20]
5. "Mangulina Chismecito" (Ramon Marrero) [2:16]
