= Two Sides of La Lupe =

Studio album by La Lupe
- Released: 1968
- Genres: Boogaloo, bolero, cha-cha-chá, salsa, plena, danzón
- Label: Tico
- Producer: Pancho Cristal

La Lupe chronology
The King and I/ El Rey y Yo (1967)	Two Sides of La Lupe (1968)	La Lupe’s Era (1968)

Two Sides of La Lupe, also known as Dos Lados de La Lupe, is an album by La Lupe. It was released by Tico Records in 1968.

Professional reviews
Review scores
Source	Rating
AllMusic	3/5 stars

In his book Tropics of Desire, Jose Quiroga wrote that, in Two Sides of La Lupe, the "dialectical modes are more fully fleshed out." Referring to the cover art, Quiroga posits that the photograph on the left depicts the impish boogaloo singer, while the photograph on the right is her "bolero pose" in which she uses the chair "as a shield for the sexy vulnerability of sadness."

== Track listing ==
Side A

1. "Que Bueno Boogaloo" (Lupe Yoli) [2:45]
2. "Te Voy a Contar Mi Vida" (Augusto Alguero) [2:00]
3. "Going Out of My Head" (Tony Randazzo) [2:42]
4. "La Plena Buena" (Paula Raymond) [1:52]
5. "Caracas Cuatricentenario" (Lupe Yoli) [1:50]

Side B

1. "Si Vuelves Tu" (P. Mauriat, R. Mamoudy) [3:11]
2. "Maldito Seas" (Ramon Marrero) [2:28]
3. "El Emigrante" (J. Valderama) [2:33]
4. "Sin Fe" (B. Capo) [2:18]
5. "Cantando" [2:46]
