= Justicia (album) =

Studio album by Eddie Palmieri
- Released: 1969
- Recorded: 1969
- Studios: Incredible Sounds, NY
- Genres: Salsa dura, Latin jazz, descarga
- Length: 41:26
- Label: Tico
- Producer: George Goldner

Eddie Palmieri chronology
Champagne (1968)	Justicia (1969)	Superimposition (1970)

Justicia is the eleventh studio album by American pianist Eddie Palmieri. It was released by Tico Records in 1969. It is Palmieri's most overtly political album, with lyrics dealing with inequality, discrimination and social justice. Described as an "integrated discourse", i.e. a concept album, it combines the popular salsa dura style of the 1970s on side A with a more innovative approach to jazz experimentation on side B.

== Background and recording ==
Throughout the 1960s, pianist Eddie Palmieri played an important role in the development of salsa with his conjunto La Perfecta. La Perfecta was one of the first Latin ensembles to feature multiple trombones, one of salsa's distinctive characteristics. The band's repertoire was inspired by Cuban and Puerto Rican dance-oriented styles such as guaracha, son, pachanga and bomba. In 1968, Palmieri disbanded La Perfecta in order to seek a more experimental approach incorporating funk and soul elements into his music. Palmieri and his new ensemble (still similar to La Perfecta, with Barry Rogers being replaced by Lewis Kahn) recorded a series of four albums for Tico that have been said to contain his "best sounding" work. These four albums were Champagne (1968), Justicia (1969), Superimposition (1970) and Vámonos Pa'l Monte (1971).

The album was recorded at Incredible Sounds studio in New York during the winter season. According to Palmieri, it was so cold he had to wear gloves during the recording sessions.

== Lyrics and composition ==
In Justicia, Palmieri demonstrates the two main traits of his music during the era, namely "a grounding in social issues" at the lyrical level, and "a continuous, insistent experimentation" at the musical level. The social aspect of the album is patent on the title track, which opens the album and has been said to "epitomize the salsa style". Although uncredited, its lyrics were written by lead singer Ismael Quintana. Musically, it has been described as "a composition in which the guaracha predominates within a multiform and polyrhythmic salsa", and its lyrics call for justice for "boricuas" (Puerto Ricans) and "niche" (African-Americans). This social theme would be continued in Palmieri's performance at Sing Sing Prison (particularly the recitations), as well as the opener of Vámonos pa'l monte, titled "Revolt / La libertad, lógico". Together with the title track, side A contains the more Latin-based pieces of the album, such as Rafael Hernández's bolero "Amor ciego" and Ignacio Piñeiro's son-rumba "Lindo yambú". The folkloric-sounding "My Spiritual Indian" contains a trumpet solo by Alfredo "Chocolate" Armenteros.

Palmieri's experimental approach to Latin jazz is mostly contained on side B of the album. "Everything Is Everything" is based on a standard blues form, with strong North American influences and a rhythm section similar to that of the soul jazz groups of the 1960s. "Verdict on Judge Street" is an extended jazz waltz, with long instrumental solos and few Latin elements. Nonetheless, on piano, Palmieri reserved his left hand for guajeos (vamping) throughout the track, while his right hand played jazz chords, creating an ambiguous contrast. The practice of including Cuban music on side A and experimental/jazz music on side B would be continued on Superimposition.

== Release ==
The album was released by Tico Records in 1969. During the recording sessions, ownership of Tico Records passed from Morris Levy to George Goldner; only the latter was credited as producer. Fania Records, which later acquired the Tico Records catalogue, re-issued the album on CD in 2006.

== Artwork ==
The album cover was designed by visual artist Ely Besalel, who had worked on many previous Latin and jazz albums for Roulette Records and Tico Records. The cover displays the album title in a "stark, bold typography" that has been said to represent "a timeless cry for justice". In the top left corner, a small picture of Palmieri sitting on the floor, "thinking, worrying", further reinforces the message of the album. The photograph was taken by Warren Flagler. Besalel, who had already worked with Palmieri, would go on to develop a longer lasting relationship with him, working on Superimposition, Vámonos pa'l monte and Unifinished Masterpiece.

== Reception and legacy ==
Professional ratings
Review scores
Source	Rating
AllMusic	3.5/5 stars

On his book Latin Jazz, John Storm Roberts wrote a favourable review of Justicia, calling it "the beginning of a number of extraordinarily important Palmieri releases". Tony Wilds wrote a mixed review for AllMusic, describing the album as "interesting" but "only average for an Eddie Palmieri record, which is still heads above most, and probably essential listening".

After its release, Justicia has a long-lasting impact on the thriving New York salsa scene, with numerous socially-conscious bands arising shortly after its release. Notable examples include Tony Pabón's La Protesta and Manny Oquendo's Conjunto Libre. Oquendo had been a long-time member of Palmieri's band, playing in most of his albums, including Justicia.

== Track listing ==
Side A
No.	Title	Writer(s)	Length
1.	"Justicia"	Eddie Palmieri	5:57
2.	"Interlude (Nelson My Brother)"	Eddie Palmieri	0:35
3.	"Amor ciego"	Rafael Hernández Marín	5:51
4.	"Lindo yambú"	Ignacio Piñeiro	5:36
5.	"My Spiritual Indian"	Eddie Palmieri	6:25

Side B
No.	Title	Writer(s)	Length
1.	"Everything Is Everything"	Eddie Palmieri, Bob Bianco	4:38
2.	""Somewhere""	Leonard Bernstein	0:23
3.	"Verdict on Judge Street"	Eddie Palmieri, Bob Bianco	11:11
4.	"Somewhere"	Leonard Bernstein	2:38

== Personnel ==
According to original album sleeve.

Eddie Palmieri & His Orchestra

- Eddie Palmieri – piano
- Ismael Quintana – vocals
- Arturo Campa – chorus
- Justo Betancourt – chorus
- Carlos "Caíto" Díaz – chorus
- Elliot Romero – chorus
- Jimy Sabater – chorus
- Lewis Kahn – trombone
- José Rodrigues – trombone
- Julian Priester – trombone (track B3)
- Mark Weinstein – trombone (track B3)
- Alfredo "Chocolate" Armenteros – trumpet
- Nicky Marrero – percussion, timbales
- Bob Bianco – guitar, vocals (track B4)
- David Herscher – bass
- Lawrence Evans – bass (track B3)
- Robert Thomas – drums (track B3)
- Francisco Aguabella – congas
- Chino Pozo – congas, bongos
- Ray Romero – congas, bongos
- Manny Oquendo – bongos
- Roberto Franquiz – claves

Technical

- George Goldner – producer
- Frank E. Dahm – engineer
- Art Kapper – technical consultant
