= Fred Weinberg =

Fred Weinberg (born Manfredo Weinberg; December 30, 1942 in Colombia) is an American composer, producer, sound designer, and founder of Fred Weinberg Productions, Inc.

== Early works ==
While attending college, he was hired by a small recording studio in Manhattan named Mastertone, where he started his training as a sound engineer. Weinberg later moved on to A & R Recording, where he worked under the tutelage of engineer-producer and owner of A & R Recording, the late Phil Ramone. After a stint at National Recording Studios, also in New York, Fred became a freelance engineer-producer and composer for many artists, particularly Latin American artists with whom he has strong bonds of musicianship and friendship.

== Production and experience ==
Weinberg began his own company, Fred Weinberg Productions, Inc. in the late 1970s, and Worldwide Music Partners, LLC in 2011, which produces live shows.

== Artists and awards ==
Weinberg has over 28 Clio Awards for advertising excellence, and an Emmy for sound design work for Discovery Channel's Carrier, Fortress At Sea. A Grammy Citation for over 50 years of membership. Work includes projects ranging from analyzing The Watergate Tapes, to working with many film makers and artists including Woody Allen and his movie, What's Up, Tiger Lily? Paramount Pictures Rosemary's Baby, and artists including Jose Feliciano, Little Anthony, Cal Tjader, Jimmy Smith, Mongo Santamaria, La Lupe, Eddie Palmieri, Paul McCartney, Ravi Shankar, Barbra Streisand, Billy Joel, Patti Russo, Dreams. Candido Camero and projects which were featured on Billboard magazine's "Hot 100," including "Sugar, Sugar", "I Like It Like That," "Watermelon Man," "Be My Baby," "Going Out of My Head."

== Present works ==
Recent works include soundtrack segment for "Im Gonna Die Young, But Its Too Late Now ©".(Autobiographical Series) and "Hitman"

== Background ==
Weinberg was born on December 30, 1942. His mother was an opera singer, and his father was a pianist. They fled Nazi Germany and wound up in Colombia, South America.

== Education ==
- The High School of Music & Art in New York City
- The Manhattan School of Music
- New York University
- The New York College Of Music, which, after 1968, was absorbed into New York University's Steinhardt School of Culture, Education and Human Development
