= !Arriba! La Pachanga =

Studio album by Mongo Santamaría
- Released: May 1959
- Recorded: 1959
- Genre: Pachanga, Cuban jazz, Latin jazz, Afro-Cuban jazz
- Label: Fantasy

Mongo Santamaría chronology
Yambu (1958)	!Arriba! La Pachanga (1959)	Mongo (1959)

Professional ratings
Review scores
Source	Rating
The Penguin Guide to Jazz Recordings	3/4 stars
Allmusic	3.5/5 stars

!Arriba! La Pachanga is an album by Mongo Santamaría, published by Fantasy Records in 1959.

== Musicians ==
Mongo Santamaría and his Band

- Mongo Santamaría – congas, bongos
- Rolando Lozano – flute
- José "Chombo" Silva – saxophone
- Felix "Pupi" Legarreta – violin
- João Donato – piano
- Victor Venegas – bass guitar
- Willie Bobo – timbales, bongos
- Cuco Martinez – timbales, percussion
- Rudy Calzado – voice

== Track listing ==
=== LP version ===
Side A
No.	Title	Writer(s)	Length
1.	"Quindimbia"	Mongo Santamaria	3:10
2.	"Sabroso"	Mongo Santamaria	3:40
3.	"Siempre En Ti"	Rolando Lozano	2:36
4.	"Chombo Chavada"	Mongo Santamaria	3:45
5.	"A Ti No Mas"	Mongo Santamaria	3:36
6.	"Mi Novia"	Alicia Correa	2:50

Side B
No.	Title	Writer(s)	Length
1.	"Antonio Y Pedro"	Felix Legarreta	3:08
2.	"Guajira at the Blackhawk"	Mongo Santamaria	2:41
3.	"Palo Mayombe"	Rudy Calzado	2:58
4.	"Loco Por Ti"	Felix Legarreta	3:21
5.	"Come Candela"	Mongo Santamaria	3:36
6.	"Olga Pachanga"	Nicholas Martinez	3:34
