= Efraín Loyola =

Cuban musician (1916–2011)

Efrain Loyola (December 18, 1916 – April 1, 2011) was a Cuban flautist from Cienfuegos, who had the distinction of being one of the oldest active flautists in the world, had a career that spanned over 7 decades and for a period, was a captain in the Cuban militia and fought in the War against the Bandits.

== Early life ==
Loyola worked as a shoeshine boy and a baker to make a living while learning and playing flute. Some of his earliest work was with the hundred-year-old Banda Municipal de Conciertos of Cienfuegos (Municipal Concert Band of Cienfuigos), which he started playing with in 1937.

== Career ==
Among the groups with which Loyola worked were the Conjunto Tradicional de Sones Los Naranjos, the Ritmica 39 and his own band, The Efrain Loyola Orchestra.

== Awards and merits ==
Loyola was given almost 150 acknowledgments and awards in his lifetime, including: "Worthy Member of the Writers and Artists Association of Cuba (UNEAC)", "Distinguished Son of Cienfuegos City", "The Jagua Award" and the order of Jesús Menéndez, granted by the Cuban Workers' Organization.

Loyola was often seen in elegant suits and with a walking stick, on the main streets of Cienfuegos, with his hair straightened in the 1950s style. He was also a Danzón fan and admirer of Miguelito Cuní and was considered an authority on Cuban musical history.

Loyola was leading his band regularly up until his death. He was buried in the local cemetery of his home town of Cienfuegos by friends, family and admirers.

== Legacy ==
Loyola's son, José Loyola is the current director of the band Charanga de Oro.

== Instrument ==
Loyola played a “Celeste” flute, named after the Cuban flautist and luthier “Celestino Dias Flores”, who maintained and standardized the wooden 5 key type needed to play charangas with the proper color after the Böehm system appeared and most manufacturers stopped making the 5 and 6 key wooden flutes.

== Discography ==
Loyola has appeared on dozens of Orquesta Aragón records and other releases that have yet to be properly catalogued on the World Wide Web from their Spanish-Cuban sources.
