= Benny Moré =

Cuban singer, bandleader and songwriter (1919–1963)

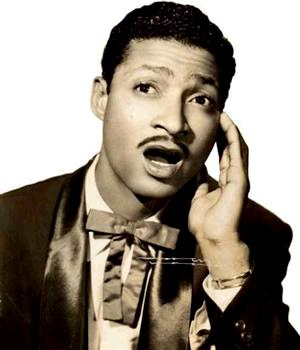

Background information
- Also known as: Beny Moré "El Bárbaro del Ritmo" "El Sonero Mayor"
- Born: Bartolomé Maximiliano Moré Gutiérrez; 24 August 1919; Santa Isabel de las Lajas, Cuba
- Died: 19 February 1963 (aged 43) Havana, Cuba
- Genres: Son montuno, mambo, guaracha, bolero, afro
- Occupations: Musician, bandleader
- Instruments: Vocals, guitar
- Years active: 1944–1963
- Labels: RCA Victor, Discuba

Bartolomé Maximiliano Moré Gutiérrez (24 August 1919 – 19 February 1963), better known as Benny Moré (also spelled Beny Moré), was a Cuban singer, bandleader and songwriter. Due to his fluid tenor voice and his great expressivity, he was known variously as "El Bárbaro del Ritmo" and "El Sonero Mayor". Moré was a master of the soneo – the art of vocal improvisation in son cubano – and many of his tunes developed this way. He often took part in controversias (vocal duels) with other singers, including Cheo Marquetti and Joseíto Fernández. Apart from son cubano, Moré was a popular singer of guarachas, cha cha cha, mambo, son montuno, and boleros.

Moré started his career with the Trío Matamoros in the 1940s and after a tour in Mexico he decided to stay in the country. Both Moré and dancer Ninón Sevilla made their cinematic debut in 1946's Carita de cielo, but Moré focused on his music career. In the late 1940s, he sang guaracha-mambos with Pérez Prado, achieving great success. Moré returned to Cuba in 1952 and worked with Bebo Valdés and Ernesto Duarte. In 1953, he formed the Banda Gigante, which became one of the leading Cuban big bands of the 1950s. He suffered from alcoholism and died of liver cirrhosis in 1963 at the age of 43.

== Early life ==
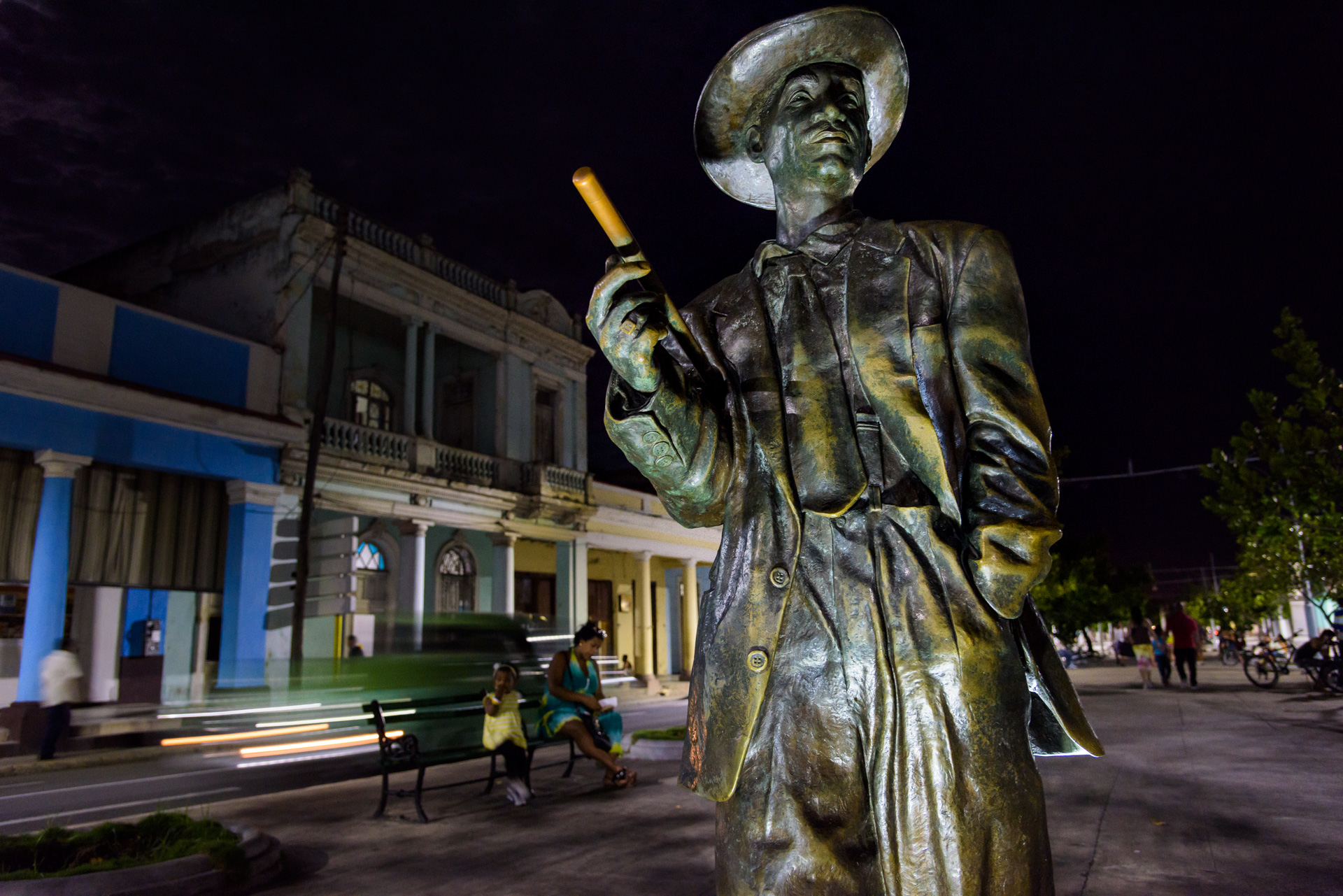
Bronze statue of Moré in Cienfuegos' Prado street

The eldest of 18 children, Moré was born in the town of Santa Isabel de las Lajas in the former Santa Clara Province, current Cienfuegos Province, in central Cuba. His parents were Virginia Moré and Silvestre Gutiérrez. His maternal great-great grandfather, Ta Ramón Gundo Paredes (later changed to Ta Ramón Gundo Moré), was said to be the son of the king of a tribe in the Kingdom of Kongo who was captured by slave traders and sold to a Cuban plantation owner named Ramon Paredes and subsequently to another Cuban landowner named Conde Moré (Paredes/Moré was later liberated and died as a freeman at age 94.)

As a child, Moré learned to play the guitar, making his first instrument at the age of six, according to his mother, from "a stick and a sardine can that served as the sound box". In 1936, at the age of 17, he left Las Lajas for Havana, where he made a living by selling bruised and damaged fruits and vegetables and medicinal herbs. Six months later, he returned to Las Lajas and went to cut cane for a season with his brother Teodoro. With the money he earned and Teodoro's savings, Moré bought his first guitar in Morón, Cuba.

== Career ==
In 1940, Moré returned to Havana. He lived from hand-to-mouth, playing in bars and cafés, passing the hat. His first breakthrough was winning a radio competition. In the early 1940s, radio station CMQ had a program called The Supreme Court of Art, in which a wide variety of artists participated. Winners were given contracts by unscrupulous businessmen, who exploited them. The less fortunate were treated to the humiliation of a loud church bell that brutally terminated their performances.

In his first appearance, Moré had scarcely begun to sing when the bell sounded, and he was booed off the stage. He later competed again and won first prize. He then landed his first stable job with the Conjunto Cauto led by Mozo Borgellá. He also sang with success on the radio station CMZ with Lázaro Cordero's Sexteto Fígaro. In 1941, Moré made his debut on Radio Mil Diez, performing with the Conjunto Cauto, directed by Mozo Borgella.

=== Conjunto Matamoros and Mexico ===
Ciro Rodríguez, of the famed Trío Matamoros, heard Moré singing in the bar El Temple and was greatly impressed. In 1942, Conjunto Matamoros was engaged for a live performance for Radio Mil Diez. However, Miguel Matamoros was indisposed and asked Mozo Borgellá to lend him a singer. Borgellá sent Moré, who worked for several years with Conjunto Matamoros, making a number of recordings.

Moré replaced Miguel Matamoros as lead singer, and the latter dedicated himself to leading the band. On 21 June 1945, Moré went with Conjunto Matamoros to Mexico, where he performed in two of the most famous cabarets: the Montparnasse and the Río Rosa. He made several recordings. Conjunto Matamoros returned to Havana, but Moré remained in Mexico. Rafael Cueto said to him: "Fine, but just remember that they call burros 'bartolo' here. Stay, but change your name." "Ok," replied Moré, "from now on my name is Beny, Beny Moré." Moré was left penniless and got permission to work from the performing artists' union. With this, he was able to get a job at the Río Rosa, where he formed the Dueto Fantasma (also known as Dueto Antillano) with Lalo Montané, in December 1945.

In Mexico City, Moré made recordings for RCA Victor, with Perez Prado: "Anabacoa", "Bonito y Sabroso", "Mucho Corazón", "Pachito Eché", "La Múcura", "Rabo y Oreja" and other numbers. He recorded "Dolor Karabalí", which Moré considered his best composition recorded with Pérez Prado, one he never wanted to re-record, also his recording in Mexico with Rafael de Paz Orchestra of "Bonito y Sabroso" was never recorded again by Moré, even though his famous composition of the months prior to leaving Mexico became in time the theme of his big band in Cuba. Moré was always reluctant to record newer versions of his hit songs, as he thought "you don't fix what's not broken". Moré and Prado recorded 28 songs in total, mostly mambos.

Moré also recorded with the orchestra of Mariano Mercerón: "Me Voy Pa'l Pueblo", "Desdichado", "Mucho Corazon", "Ensalada de Mambo", "Rumberos de Ayer" and "Encantado de la Vida" with "El Conjunto de Lalo Montane", a Colombian singer and composer, with which he recorded in Mexico, conforming a famous duo called "The Phantom Duet" or "Dueto Fantasma". He also recorded with Mexican orchestras, specially with the one directed by Rafael de Paz; they recorded "Yiri Yiri Bon", "La Culebra", "Mata Siguaraya", "Solamente Una Vez" and "Bonito y Sabroso", a mambo song where he praises the dancing skills of the Mexicans and claims that Mexico City and La Habana are sister cities. In this time Benny also recorded with the orchestra of Jesús "Chucho" Rodríguez. El "Chucho" was so impressed with Benny's musical ability that he referred to him as "El Bárbaro del Ritmo".

Moré and other performers such as Amalia Aguilar appeared as themselves in the Ernesto Cortázar-directed 1949 film En cada puerto un amor, a film in the musical comedy and drama genres.

=== Return to Cuba ===
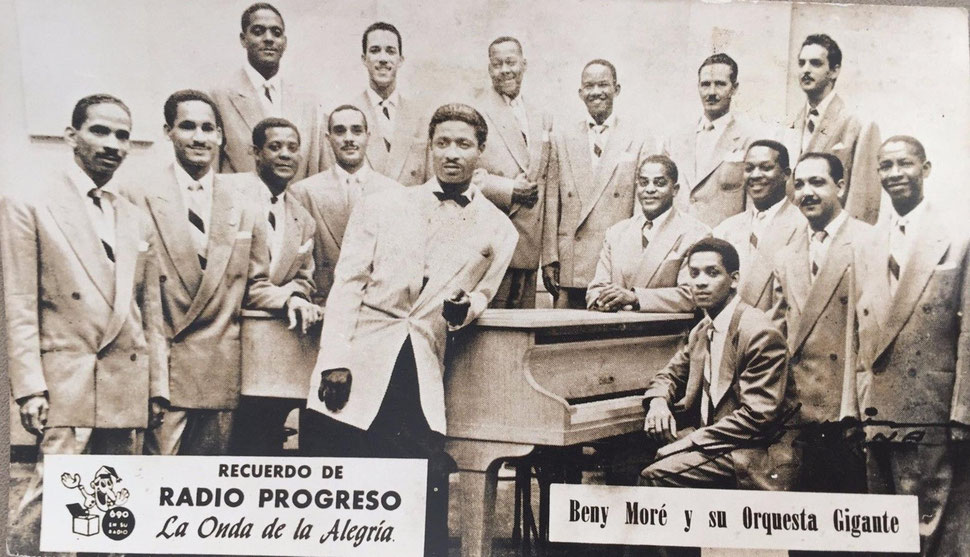
Moré and his "Orquesta Gigante" at Radio Progreso in the late 1950s

During the spring of 1952, around April, Moré returned to Cuba. He was a star in Mexico, the Dominican Republic, Panama, Colombia, Brazil and Puerto Rico, but virtually unknown on the island. His first Cuban recordings were with Mariano Mercerón & his Orchestra, including songs such as "Fiesta de Tambores", "Salomón", "La Chola", among others. Moré began alternating between performances in the Cadena Oriental radio station and trips to Havana to record at the RCA studios in CMQ Radiocentro.

In Havana, Moré worked for the radio station RHC-Cadena Azul, with the orchestra of Bebo Valdés, who introduced the new style called "batanga". The presenter of the show, Ibraín Urbino, presented him as El Bárbaro del Ritmo. They offered him the opportunity to record with Sonora Matancera, but he declined the offer because he did not care for the sound of the group. After the batanga fell out of fashion, Moré was contracted by Radio Progreso with the orchestra of Ernesto Duarte Brito. In addition to the radio, he also performed at dances, cabarets and parties. When he sang in Havana's Centro Gallego, people filled the sidewalks and the gardens of the Capitolio to hear him. In 1952, Moré made a recording with the Orquesta Aragón with whom he would perform in dance halls. Orquesta Aragón was from Cienfuegos and was having trouble breaking into Havana and Moré helped them in this way.

=== Banda Gigante ===
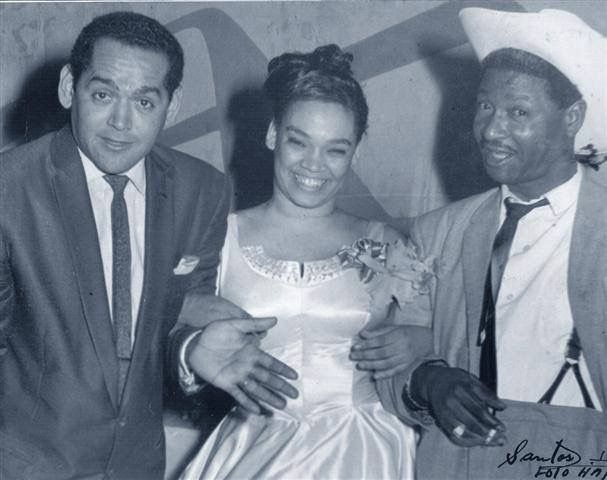
Moré (right) with La Lupe and Pacho Alonso, c. 1959. All three were signed to the RCA Victor subsidiary Discuba.

Also in 1952, Moré was told that Duarte Brito was not taking Moré to certain Saturday engagements because Moré was black. Moré was furious and brought the issue up to the RCA Records agent in Cuba (Maurico Conde). When nothing was done, Moré decided to form his own orchestra. The first performance of Moré's Banda Gigante was in the CMQ radio program Cascabeles Candado on August 3, 1953. The original lineup featured Ignacio Cabrera "Cabrerita" (piano); Miguel Franca, Santiago Peñalver, Roberto Barreto, Celso Gómez and Virgilio Vixama (saxophones); Alfredo "Chocolate" Armenteros, Rigoberto "Rabanito" Jiménez and Domingo Corbacho (trumpets); José Miguel Gómez (trombone); Alberto Limonta (double bass); Tabaquito (congas); Clemente Piquero "Chicho" (bongos); Rolando Laserie (drums), and Fernando Álvarez and Enrique Benitez (vocals). The Banda was generally sixteen musicians, comparable in size with the orchestras of Xavier Cugat and Pérez Prado. Although Moré could not read music, he arranged material by singing parts to his arrangers, which included pianists Cabrerita and Peruchín, as well as trombonist Generoso Jiménez.

Between the years 1953 and 1955, the Banda Gigante became immensely popular. Their first recording session took place in November 1953, which included the hit "Manzanillo". Other hits followed, including self-penned songs such as "Mi saoco", "Santa Isabel de las Lajas", "Cienfuegos" and "Dolor y perdón". In 1956 and 1957, they toured Dominican Republic, Venezuela, Jamaica, Haiti, Colombia, Panama, Mexico, Puerto Rico and the United States, where the group played at the Academy Awards. In Havana, they played at a multitude of dance halls and cabarets such as the Tropicana Club, La Campana, El Sierra, Night and Day, Alí Bar Club, and the Hotel Habana Riviera and Hotel Tryp Habana Libre.

Moré was offered a tour of Europe, France in particular, but he rejected it because of his fear of flying; he had by that time been in three airplane accidents.

=== Final years ===
In the aftermath of the Cuban Revolution, many of Cuba's top musical figures emigrated, but Moré stayed in Cuba, among, as he said, "mi gente" (my people).

== Death ==
Moré suffered from alcoholism and died of cirrhosis in 1963 at the age of 43. His funeral was attended by tens of thousands of people.

== Awards and recognition ==
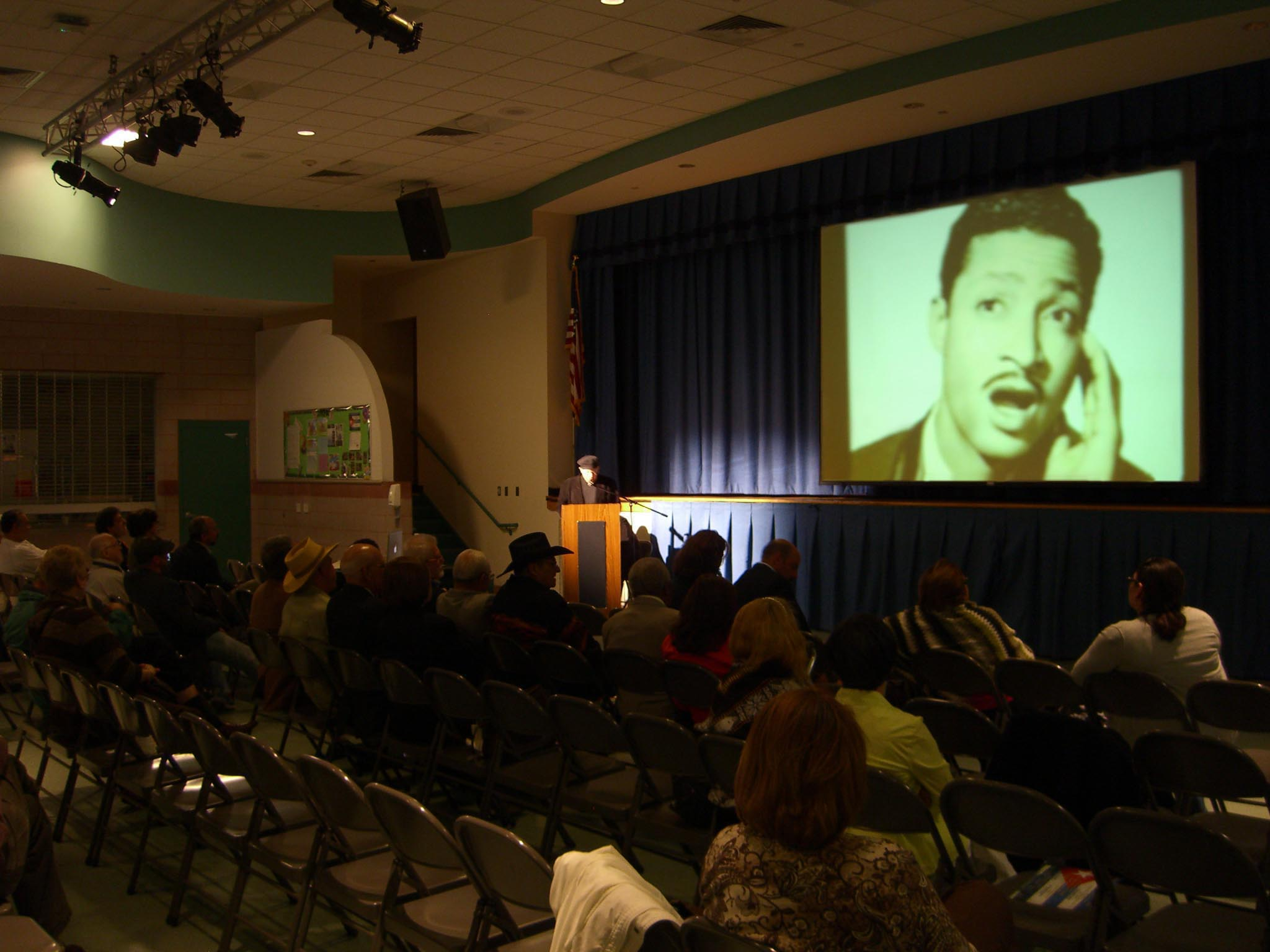
A 12 May 2011 multimedia lecture on Moré in the heavily Cuban-American community of Union City, New Jersey

Moré has been cited as the greatest singer in Cuban music history by critics and musicians. In 1999, Moré was posthumously inducted into the International Latin Music Hall of Fame and the Latin Songwriters Hall of Fame in 2016. The Benny Moré Memorial Award was named in honor of the artist and was given to artists who were influential in Latin music. On 11 June 2006, Moré was honored with a star on the Walk of Fame at Celia Cruz Park in Union City, New Jersey, a heavily Cuban-American community that has hosted musical presentations and multimedia lectures on the singer.

== Legacy ==
Beny Moré appears as a character in the novel The Island of Eternal Love (Penguin Random House, 2008), by Cuban-American writer Daína Chaviano, who also concludes her novel with a chapter titled "Today as Yesterday", one of the best interpretations of this singer. Moré is also remembered in the 2006 film El Benny, which is based on parts of his life, and includes new versions of his songs performed by musicians including Chucho Valdés, Juan Formell and Orishas.

Numerous tribute albums consisting of cover versions of Moré's songs have been released by artists such as Tito Puente (1978, 1979 and 1985), Charanga de la 4 (1981), Bobby Carcassés (1985), Tropicana All-Stars (2004) and Jon Secada (2017).

== Selected discography ==
Records from 1963 onwards include at least one or more unreleased songs.

- El Inigualable (Discuba, 1957)
- The Most From Beny Moré (Victor, 1958; recorded 1955–1957)
- Así es... (Victor, 1958)
- Pare... que llegó el bárbaro (Victor/Discuba, 1958)
- Así es... Beny (Discuba, 1958)
- La Época de Oro (Victor, 1958)
- Magia antillana (Victor, 1960; recorded 1949–1953)
- El Barbaro del Ritmo with Perez Prado and Rafael De Paz (Victor, 1962; recorded 1949–1951)
- Homenaje póstumo (Discuba, 1963; recorded 1960)
- Benny More Y Su Orquesta... (Palma, 1964)
- Recordando (RCA Camden, 1964)
- Lo Mejor de Beny Moré (RCA, 1965)
- La Época De Oro Vol.II (RCA, 1969)
- y Su Salsa de Siempre (RCA, 1978)
- Grandes Exitos (Darcole Music, 1979)
- Ensalada De Mambo (RCA, 1980)
- Lo Último Que Cantó Beny More (Integra, 1980)
- Lo Desconocido De Beny More (RCA, 1982)
- Cubanísimo-1 with Trío Matamoros and Ernesto Duarte's orchestra (Producciones Preludio, 1983; recorded 1945–1947)
- Leyendas Musicales (Producciones Preludio, 1986)
- Beny Moré Canta Con... (RCA, 1988)
- Conjunto Matamoros With Beny Moré with Conjunto Matamoros (Tumbao Cuban Classics, 1992; recorded 1945–1947)
- El Barbaro del Ritmo with Perez Prado (Tumbao Cuban Classics, 1992; recorded 1949–1951)
- Benny Moré En Vivo (Discmedi, 1995; recorded 1957)
- Benny More Canta Boleros (Estudios EGREM, 2006; recorded 1953–1960)

== See also ==
- List of Afro-Latinos
