= Alfredo "Chocolate" Armenteros =

Cuban jazz trumpeter (1928–2016)

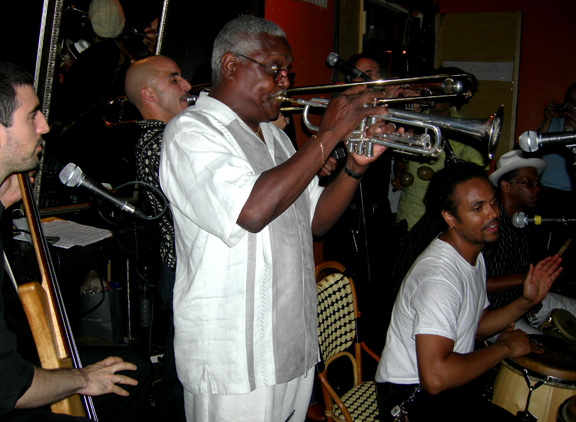
- Armenteros performing at Star 64 in New York City

Background information
- Born: Alfredo Armenteros; 4 April 1928; Santa Clara, Las Villas, Cuba
- Died: 6 January 2016 (aged 87) New York City, New York, U.S.
- Genres: Son cubano, descarga, big band, Latin jazz, salsa
- Occupation: Musician
- Instruments: Trumpet, Flugelhorn
- Labels: Alegre, Fania, Salsoul, Epic

Alfredo "Chocolate" Armenteros (4 April 1928 – 6 January 2016) was a Cuban trumpeter. He played with artists such as Arsenio Rodríguez, Generoso Jiménez, Chico O'Farrill, Orchestra Harlow, Eddie Palmieri, Cachao and Sonora Matancera. Due to his characteristic approach to Afro-Cuban trumpet playing as well as his extensive recording career, several monographs have been written on his music.

== Life and career ==
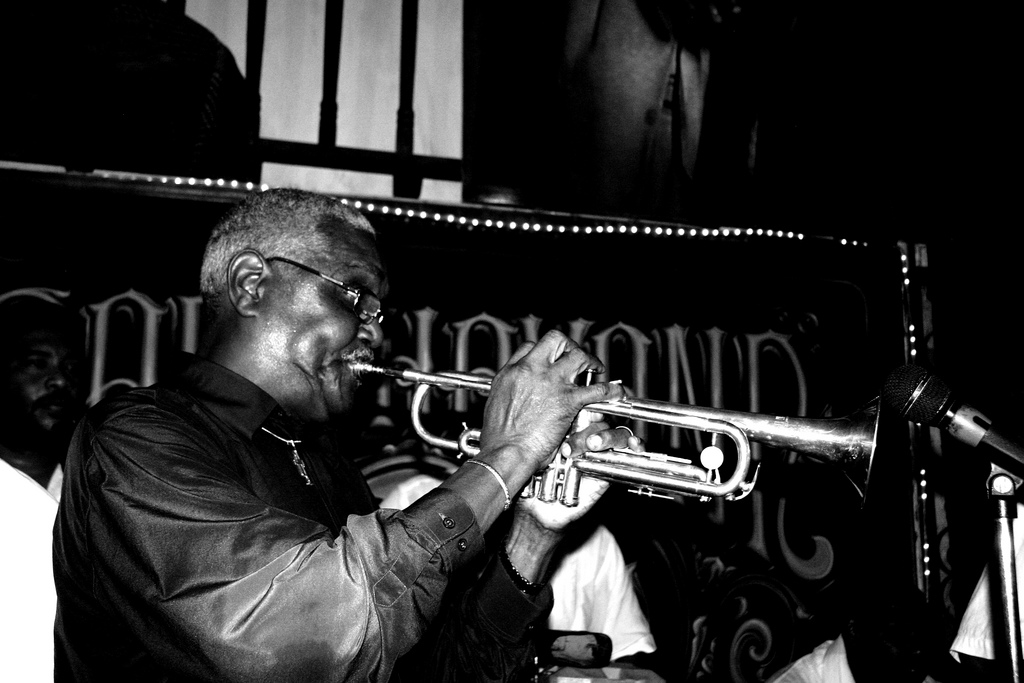
Armenteros performing at Café Havana, Cartagena de Indias.

Armenteros was born on 4 April 1928, in Santa Clara, Las Villas Province, Cuba. He first began playing in a band led by the sonero/composer René Álvarez called Conjunto Los Astros and soon after with Arsenio Rodríguez. The nickname "Chocolate" was bestowed on him owing to a case of mistaken identity, when someone took him for Kid Chocolate, the champion boxer. After the Cuban Revolution, Armenteros moved to New York, where he lived until his death.

Armenteros went on to play with José Fajardo, Beny Moré, Tito Puente, César Concepción, Machito, Wynton Marsalis, Eddie Palmieri, Marcelino Guerra, Charlie Palmieri, John Santos, Israel "Cachao" López, Noro Morales, Johnny Pacheco, and many others. He was a member of La Sonora Matancera from 1977 to 1980.

== Death ==
He died of prostate cancer on 6 January 2016, aged 87.

Following his death, the corner of Third Avenue and East 122nd Street in East Harlem was co-named Alfredo "Chocolate" Armenteros Way. The location was selected because Armenteros was a resident of the Taino Towers apartments for 30 years until his death.

== Discography ==
=== Solo albums ===
- Chocolate... En El Rincon (Salsoul Records, 1976)
- Y Sigo Con Mi Son (SAR Records, 1979)
- Monsieur Chocolate Prefiero El Son (SAR Records, 1980)
- Chocolate Dice (SAR Records, 1982)
- Chocolate y Su Sexteto Rompiendo Hielo (Caiman Records, 1984)
- Chocolate & His Cuban Soul (Caiman Records, 1997)

=== With Generoso Jiménez ===
- Ritmo (Kubaney, 1957)

=== With Mongo Santamaría and La Lupe ===
- Mongo Introduces La Lupe (Riverside, 1963)

=== With Orlando Marin ===
- Qué chévere (Alegre, 1964)

=== With Orchestra Harlow ===
- Heavy Smokin' (Fania Records, 1965)
- Gettin' Off / Bajándote (Fania, 1966)

=== With Eddie Palmieri ===
- Champagne (Tico Records, 1968)
- Justicia (Tico, 1969)
- Superimposition (Tico, 1970)
- Vamonos Pa'l Monte (Tico, 1971)
- Lucumí, Macumba, Voodoo (Epic, 1978)

=== With Grupo Folklórico y Experimental Nuevayorquino ===
- Concepts in Unity (Salsoul, 1975)

=== With Cachao ===
- Cachao y su Descarga 77 (Salsoul, 1977)
- Dos (Salsoul, 1977)
- Master Sessions, Volume 1 (Epic, 1994)
- Master Sessions, Volume 2 (Epic, 1995)

=== With Machito ===
- Machito!!! (Timeless 1983)

=== With Cedar Walton ===
- Eastern Rebellion 4 (Timeless, 1984)

=== With Kip Hanrahan ===
- Tenderness (American Clavé, 1990)

=== With El Trabuco Venezolano ===
- El Trabuco Venezolano Vol. II (YVKCT con músiC.A., 1979)
