= The Island of Eternal Love =

Novel by Daína Chaviano

- First edition (Spanish)
- Author: Daína Chaviano
- Original title: La isla de los amores infinitos
- Translator: Andrea Labinger
- Language: Spanish
- Series: The Occult Side of Havana
- Genre: Historical fiction, Fantasy, Family Saga, Paranormal Romance
- Publisher: Grijalbo (Spain); Riverhead (U.S.)
- Publication date: 2006
- Publication place: Cuba
- English publication date: 2008
- Media type: Print (Hardcover & Paperback)
- Pages: 318 pp
- ISBN: 978-1-59448-992-1
- OCLC: 183267712
- Dewey Decimal: 863/.64 22
- LC Class: PQ7390.C52 I7513 2008

The Island of Eternal Love is a 2006 novel by Cuban author Daína Chaviano.

The plot is a family saga that takes place along two parallel lines: one during our time and another that begins in the 1850s.

The modern story revolves around the paranormal investigations of Cecilia, a young journalist researching a phantom house that appears and disappears in different parts of Miami. Several witnesses claim to have seen the inhabitants of that house, whose behavior seems to hide a secret that she decides to find out.

Before starting her investigations into the house, Cecilia goes to a bar, where she meets an old woman whom she befriends. Night after night, Cecilia listens to the story of that woman, who returns to that spot each evening to await a mysterious visitor. And this account is the other part of the novel, which begins in the nineteenth century in three regions of the world: Africa (Kingdom of Ifé, currently Nigeria), China (Canton) and Spain (Cuenca).

Different magical or supernatural events conspire to make the three stories from the past begin to mix: an ancient god’s promise changes the future of a young woman in the mountains of Cuenca (Spain); a ritual in which the presence of a sensual deity is invoked is secretly witnessed by a young girl, who falls under the demonic spell of the goddess; a spirit that can only be seen by the women in a family triggers events that decide the fate of all; the sudden appearance of a ghost causes a widow’s ruin... All of these events culminate in the story of a love that must face the opposition of two families.

Part history, part romance, part gothic, part esoteric, the novel also pays homage to the bolero. Historical personages from the world of music mix with fictional characters and are part of the plot: the pianist Joaquín Nin (father of Anaïs Nin), Ernesto Lecuona, Rita Montaner, Beny Moré, La Lupe, singer Fredesvinda García and others are historical figures caught up in the story.

The novel was first published in Spain by Grijalbo (Random House Group) in 2006 as La isla de los amores infinitos.

The Island of Eternal Love, whose rights have been sold to 26 languages, has become the most translated Cuban novel of all time.

Its English edition was released by Riverhead Books-Penguin Group (translated by Andrea L. Labinger) in June 2008.
