= Discuba =

- Parent company: RCA Victor
- Founded: 1959
- Founder: Jesús Humara
- Genre: Cuban music
- Country of origin: Cuba
- Location: North Bergen, New Jersey

Discuba is a Cuban record label founded in 1959 by RCA Victor. It released music by several internationally successful artists such as Beny Moré, Orquesta Aragón and La Lupe. Following the end of the Cuban Revolution and the nationalization of the music industry by the Cuban government in 1961, Discuba relocated to Hialeah, Florida, as did many Cuban independent labels. Since the late 1980s the label has mostly reissued its back catalogue, and moved its headquarters to North Bergen, New Jersey.

== History ==
Victor began its operations in Cuba in 1904 in collaboration with the Spanish-Cuban company Humara y Lastra, originally a pottery business. Headquartered in Havana's Muralla Street, Humara was in charge of the manufacture, distribution and A&R of Victor's Cuban operations. For over 30 years Victor's only competition in Cuba were other major labels such as Columbia. In 1935, some of Victor's old recording equipment was purchased by the CMQ Radio Station, and in 1937 they were taken over by the new Radio Cadena Suaritos, as CMQ moved location. This marked the beginning of independent recording in Cuba, although such radio material was generally not in circulation. In the 1940s, with the emergence of Panart, the Cuban music industry began a shift that peaked in the late 1950s with the appearance of numerous independent record labels such as Puchito, Kubaney and Maype. Facing such competition, RCA Victor decided to create a new label to consolidate its Cuban operations. Thus Discuba was created, under the direction of Jesús Humara, and with Eliseo Valdés serving as A&R manager; both had been involved with Victor for many years. The establishment of Discuba was part of larger strategy to strengthen RCA Victor's position in the Latin American market, which included multiple manufacturing deals in Venezuela, Puerto Rico, Colombia, Ecuador, Jamaica, and Trinidad.

On May 29, 1961, Discuba was forced to relocate to the United States following the nationalization of the Cuban record industry by Fidel Castro's government and the transfer of its assets to the Imprenta Nacional de Cuba (INC). Between 1961 and 1964, the INC was responsible for manufacturing and distributing already recorded albums by Discuba, Puchito, Panart and Gema. Discuba continued its operations stateside, although its number of yearly releases dropped over the course of the 1960s. In 1963, the newly established Real label began issuing Discuba's LPs in Colombia.

== Roster ==
From its inception, Discuba's roster featured several high-profile Cuban acts, such as Beny Moré, Pacho Alonso, Orquesta Aragón and Felipe Dulzaide's group. The latter served as the backing band for La Lupe's first recordings, released by Discuba under the title Con el diablo en el cuerpo. Moré came into the label already as an "RCA-exclusive artist", and continued his previous success obtaining a Golden Record for his guaracha "Se te cayó el tabacó" in 1961.
