= Tito Puente Swings, The Exciting Lupe Sings =

Studio album by La Lupe, Tito Puente
- Released: 1965
- Label: Tico
- Producer: Teddy Reig

La Lupe, Tito Puente chronology
Tito Puente Swings, The Exciting Lupe Sings (1965)	Tu y Yo (1965)

Tito Puente Swings, The Exciting Lupe Sings, also known as La exitante Lupe canta con el maestro Tito Puente, is an album by La Lupe and Tito Puente. It was released by Tico Records in 1965. AllMusic gave the album a rating of two-and-a-half stars.

== Track listing ==
Side A

1. "Todo" (A. Alguerod) [2:00]
2. "Yo No Lloro Mas" (Myrta Silva) [2:58]
3. "Bomba Na' Ma'" (Rafael Davila) [2:44]
4. "Adios" (A. Alguerod) [2:50]
5. "Menealo (Tiene La Azucar Abajo)" (Luis Kalaff) [3:04]
6. "Homenaje a Juan Vicente" (Billo Formeta) [2:38]

Side B

1. "Jala Jala" (Roberto, Andy, Pellin) [2:14]
2. "Maria Dolores" (A. Alguerod) [3:43]
3. "Mi Socio" (Rafael Davila) [2:38]
4. "Que te Pedi" (Mullens, de la Fuente) [3:45]
5. "Junto a Ti" (A. Alguerod) [3:08]
6. "Elube Chango" (Alberto Rivera) [2:15]
