= Mongo Returns! =

Studio album by Mongo Santamaría
- Released: 1995
- Genre: Latin jazz
- Label: Milestone
- Producer: Todd Barkan

Mongo Santamaría chronology
Mambo Mongo (1992)	Mongo Returns! (1995)	Brazilian Sunset (1996)

Mongo Returns! is an album by the Cuban musician Mongo Santamaría. It was released in 1995. The album marked Santamaria's return to the Fantasy Records label.

== Production ==
The album was produced by Todd Barkan. Its songs were arranged by Marty Sheller. Hilton Ruiz played piano on the album. Eddie Allen played trumpet. "Bahia" is a cover of the Ary Barroso song; "When Did You Stop Loving Me, When Did I Stop Loving You" is a version of the Marvin Gaye song.

== Critical reception ==
Professional ratings
Review scores
Source	Rating
AllMusic	4/5 stars
The Encyclopedia of Popular Music	4/5 stars
MusicHound World: The Essential Album Guide	4/5 stars

The Milwaukee Journal Sentinel called the album "marvelous Latin big band" music. The Boston Herald lamented that "the band's performances rarely rise above pleasant and competent." City Pages noted that, "rather than wallow in a groove, the tunes on [the] CD continually shift gears, deploying the percussionists as much for texture as for rhythm and varying the pace."

The Albuquerque Journal deemed Mongo Returns! one of the best Latin jazz albums of 1995; The Chicago Citizen also listed it among the best of 1995.

AllMusic wrote that "Mongo's large ensemble sounds sharp, at home with the Latin beat, up-to-date electronic instruments and occasional skipping bassline, and Mongo thunders away with his usual polyrhythmic vigor."

== Track listing ==
No.	Title	Length
1.	"A Kiss in Her Glance"
2.	"You've Got It Bad Girl"
3.	"Bahia"
4.	"Slyck 'n' Slyde"
5.	"Song for Marilyn"
6.	"When Did You Stop Loving Me, When Did I Stop Loving You"
7.	"Hush"
8.	"Ol' School Groove"
9.	"Free World Mambo"
