= Jock McLean =

Scottish footballer

Personal information
- Full name: John Calderwood McLean
- Date of birth: 30 March 1908
- Place of birth: Busby, Scotland
- Date of death: 2 April 1988 (aged 80)
- Place of death: Bristol, England
- Height: 6 ft 0 in (1.83 m)
- Position: Centre half

Senior career*
Years	Team	Apps	(Gls)
????–1930	Kirkintilloch Rob Roy		
1930–1933	Blackburn Rovers	8	(0)
1933–1938	Bristol Rovers	134	(1)
1938–1939	Street		

Managerial career
- 1938–1939: Street
- 1945–1946: Bristol Rovers Colts
- * Club domestic league appearances and goals

John Calderwood McLean (30 March 1908 – 2 April 1988) was a professional footballer who played in the Football League as a centre half for Blackburn Rovers and Bristol Rovers.

Born in Busby, East Renfrewshire, McLean's first club was Scottish side Kirkintilloch Rob Roy, from where he joined Blackburn in 1930, and played eight times for them in the Football League First Division. In 1933 he signed for Bristol Rovers and was an ever-present in their team for his first two seasons with the club, picking up the Division Three (South) Cup in 1935. He went on to make 134 league appearances for Bristol Rovers, scoring once, before leaving to become player-manager of Street in 1938.

Street released McLean in 1939 following the outbreak of World War II, but he returned to management in 1945, taking charge of Bristol Rovers' Colts team for a single season. He continued living in Bristol for the remainder of his life, dying three days after his 80th birthday in 1988.

== Sources ==
- Jay, Mike; Byrne, Stephen (1994). Pirates in Profile: A Who's Who of Bristol Rovers Players. Bristol: Potten, Baber & Murray. p. 163. ISBN 0-9524835-0-5.
