= Mi saoco =

Single by Benny Moré y su Banda Gigante
- B-side: "Celosa"
- Released: 1955
- Recorded: February 15, 1955
- Genre: Son montuno
- Length: 2:51
- Label: RCA Victor
- Songwriter(s): Benny Moré

Benny Moré y su Banda Gigante singles chronology
"Buscando la melodía" (1955)	"Mi saoco" (1955)	"Y hoy como ayer" (1955)

"Mi saoco" is a son montuno written and performed by Cuban singer Benny Moré. It was recorded in February 1955 and released as a single by RCA Victor later that year. Moré's recording featured his Banda Gigante with Eduardo Cabrera "Cabrerita" on piano and a large horn section featuring Santiago Peñalver on saxophone. The song became a staple of Moré's live repertoire, and one of his performances was filmed for television and later shown on BBC Arena in 1984 and 1986. That performance features Generoso Jiménez on trombone, who joined the Banda Gigante in April 1955, after the original studio recording.

Although labelled as a son montuno on the original single, "Mi saoco" has also been considered a guaracha-son due to its fast tempo. The lyrics of the song mention various places in Cuba: Vertientes, Camagüey, Florida and Morón, significant towns in Moré's past. Because of its refrain, the song is also known as "Me voy pa' Morón", not to be confused with the song of the same name composed by José Herrera and released also in 1955 by Orquesta Melodías del 40.

== See also ==
- Benny Moré discography
