= Trio of Doom =

Jazz trio active in 1979

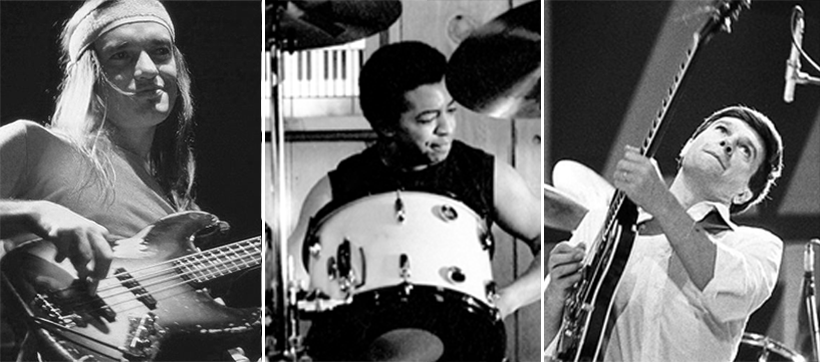
- Montage of the three members of the Trio of Doom (pictured in the 1980s); From left: Pastorius, Williams and McLaughlin

Background information
- Origin: New York City, U.S.
- Genres: Jazz fusion
- Years active: 1979
- Label: Columbia
- Past members: Jaco Pastorius; Tony Williams; John McLaughlin

The Trio of Doom was a short-lived jazz fusion power trio consisting of John McLaughlin on guitar, Jaco Pastorius on bass, and Tony Williams on drums. They were brought together by Columbia Records in 1979 to play the Havana Jam festival in Cuba alongside Billy Joel, Kris Kristofferson, Rita Coolidge, and others.

They were named by Pastorius. He had earlier called his bass the "Bass of Doom," because of its growling sound.

Their only live performance was on March 3, 1979, and it is recorded on Ernesto Juan Castellanos's documentary Havana Jam '79.

On March 8, 1979, the group reconvened in New York City to record the songs they had played live, but a dispute broke out between Pastorius and Williams that ended the trio.

An album was released on June 26, 2007, on Legacy Recordings, containing five tracks from Havana Jam and five recorded in the studio.

== Trio of Doom (album) ==
Trio of Doom

Studio album by Trio of Doom
- Released: June 26, 2007
- Recorded: March 3 and March 8, 1979
- Venues: Karl Marx Theater, Havana, Cuba
- Studios: CBS, New York City, U.S.
- Genre: Jazz fusion
- Length: 39:59
- Labels: Columbia; Legacy
- Producers: John McLaughlin; Richard Seidel (exec.)

Professional ratings
Review scores
Source	Rating
AllMusic	4/5 stars
The Guardian	3/5 stars
All About Jazz	4/5 stars

=== Track listing ===
No.	Title	Writer(s)	Length
1.	"Drum Improvisation (live)"	Williams	2:46
2.	"Dark Prince (live)"	McLaughlin	6:36
3.	"Continuum (live)"	Pastorius	5:11
4.	"Para Oriente (live)"	Williams	5:42
5.	"Are You The One, Are You The One? (live)"	McLaughlin	4:51
6.	"Dark Prince"	McLaughlin	4:11
7.	"Continuum"	Pastorius	3:49
8.	"Para Oriente (alternate take one)"	Williams	1:05
9.	"Para Oriente (alternate take two)"	Williams	0:20
10.	"Para Oriente"	Williams	5:28
Total length:			39:59

Tracks 1–5 were recorded on 3 March 1979, at the Karl Marx Theatre, Havana, Cuba. Tracks 6–10 were recorded on 8 March 1979, at CBS Studios, New York.
