= Richard Egües =

Cuban flautist and composer (1923–2006)

- Born: Richard Egües; October 26, 1923; Cruces, Las Villas, Cuba
- Origin: Cuba
- Died: September 1, 2006 (aged 82) Cuba
- Genres: Charanga; Danzón; Cha-cha-chá; Cuban music
- Occupations: Flautist; Composer; Musician
- Years active: 1940s–2000s

Richard Egües, nicknamed "la flauta mágica" (the magic flute), (October 26, 1923 - September 1, 2006) was a Cuban flautist and musician, one of the country's most famous artists. Egües was a member of the Orquesta Aragón band which he joined in 1955. He was also a strong supporter of the Cuban Revolution. A few days before he died, Richard Egües stated "I would give my life for him", referring to the Cuban President Fidel Castro, who was very sick at the time.

Egües composed what are today classics of salsa, such as "Sabrosona", "Bombón cha", "Así Es Mejor", "La Muela", "Gladys", "El cerquillo", "El Cuini" and his most well-known song, "El bodeguero", which became part of Nat King Cole's repertoire.

Egües was born in the town of Cruces in the Cuban province of Las Villas on October 26, 1923. After learning to play saxophone, clarinet and piano, he decided to pick up the flute in the late 1940s, in part, because flute players were able to take more breaks during performances. Egües later came to be the foremost exponent of the charanga style of Cuban flute playing.

Charanga bands consist of vocals, percussion, strings and a flautist with the flute serving as a prominent and central voice. Charanga music has a characteristic classical or ‘ballroom’ aspect to it as it was historically intended for the wealthier classes. Accordingly, this style reflects a blend of Spanish and French contredanse as well as African roots. The tunes played by charanga bands are typically the ‘danzon’ (with its characteristic five-beat percussive figure known as the cinquillo) and the more the familiar ‘cha cha cha’ (which, unlike most other Cuban styles, is not rooted in the clave).

Egües served for many years as the flautist with a popular charanga band known as Orquesta Aragón. The ensemble was founded in 1939. After substituting in the band on many occasions over a period of years, Richard was finally solicited by the leader to become a full-time member when Rolando Lozano left the group in 1954. Once installed, Egües remained with Orquesta Aragón for over three decades and became an active participant (as flautist, writer and arranger) in the band's most renowned works and, in a genuine sense, began to define this style of Cuban music as Orquesta Aragón became a world-renowned performing group—and in no small measure on account of Egües’ own personal popularity.
