= Five-key flute =

Musical instrument

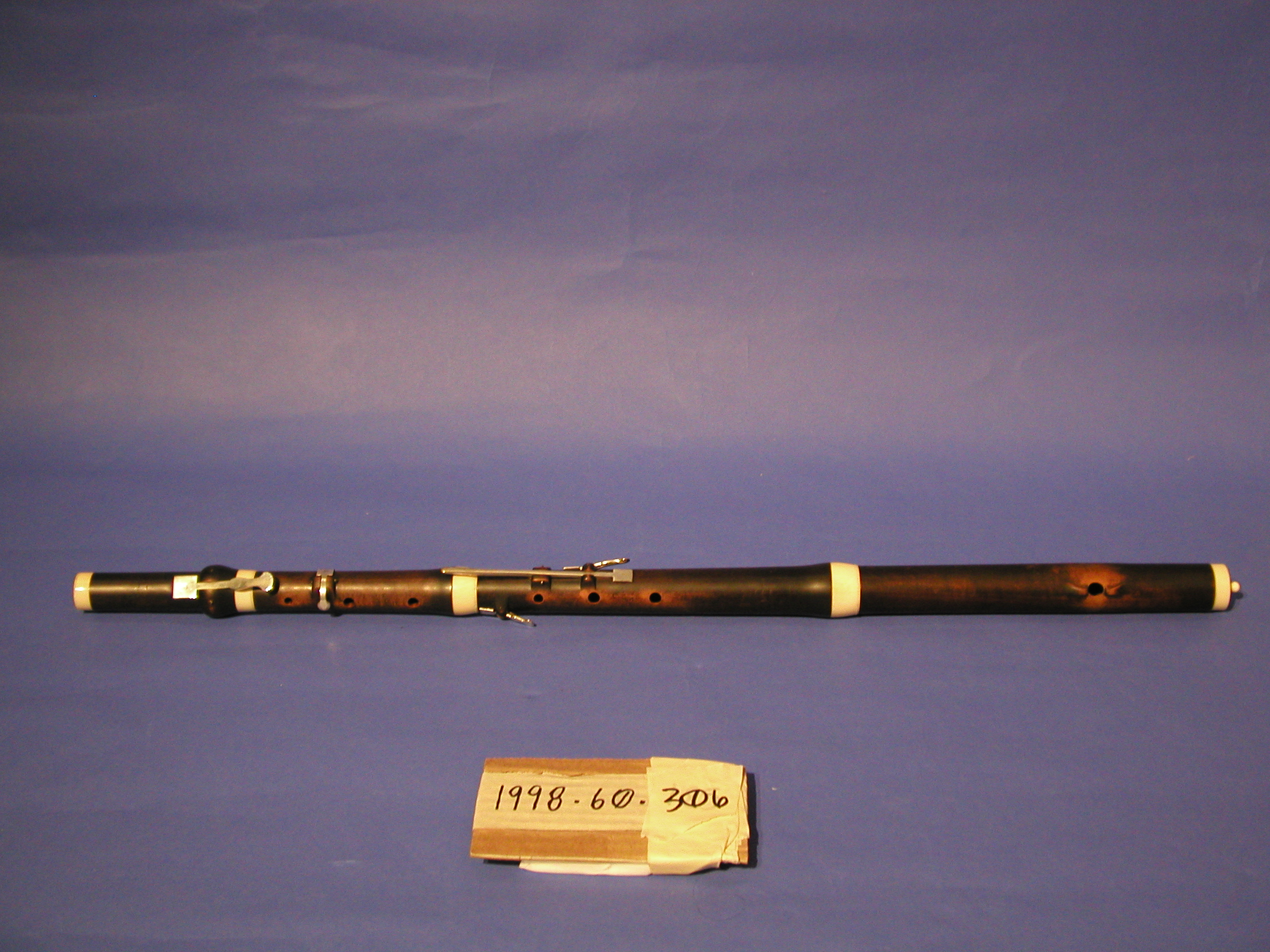
Flute, in A, stained boxwood, five silver keys made by Tebaldo Monzani circa 1813

The five-key flute is a musical instrument once common in school marching bands, and composed of wood with metal keys. It is a transposing instrument, most commonly in A♭, this variant being known as the B♭ flute, named after its lowest note and sounding a minor sixth below the orchestral piccolo. The next most common variants are the E♭ piccolo (in concert D♭), sounding a fifth above the B♭ flute, and the F flute (in concert E♭), sounding a fifth below the B♭ flute. The E♭ piccolo is used for ornamentation in melodies and the F flute is used as a bass instrument in flute band harmonies. They are now often found in British military corps of drums, often playing various regimental marches.

As the name suggests, the five-key flute most commonly has five keys, as do many historic 19th-century French and German simple system flutes. Simple system keying on wooden tapered bore flutes was the standard orchestral instrument before It was eventually replaced by the Boehm cylindrical bored flute keying system. See Boehm System. It evolved from the baroque one key transverso flute. The four key flute preempted the five key, and it progressed through multiple keyed flutes. It uses the six-hole fingering system of the fife for its natural scale, with the metal keys adding the ability to play the full chromatic scale and therefore making it possible to play in any key.

The keys of the B♭ flute are (starting with the hole closest to the mouthpiece):

1. The C key, a long key running along the back of the instrument (the side closest to the player) and operated by the right index finger.
2. The A♯ key, a short key running along the bottom of the instrument, operated by the left thumb.
3. The G♯ key, running across the top of the instrument and operated by the little finger of the left hand.
4. The F key, running across the back of the instrument and operated by the third finger of the right hand.
5. The E♭ key, running across the top of the instrument and operated by the little finger of the right hand.

Some flutes include a sixth key known as the "Long F" key which provides alternative fingering which may be useful in certain passages of music. It is a similar shape and size to the C key, but runs along the front of the flute and is placed next to the G♯ key and is also operated by the little finger of the left hand. F♮ is an uncommon note in traditional music for the five-key flute, but where it appears the short F key is sometimes awkward to play.

The keys of the 19th-century five-key D flute include an E♭ key, F key, G♯ key, and either a C key or a long left hand additional F key.

The modern five-key flute is conical in bore, with a cylindrical head joint and a body that tapers to become narrowest furthest from the mouthpiece.

French five-key flutes were once the preferred flute for use in charanga bands due to their distinct tone and facility in their third and fourth octave.
