= Latin soul =

Musical genre

- Stylistic origins: Latin jazz; soul music; mambo
- Cultural origins: Mid to late 1960s New York City. Based mainly on Cuban and Nuyorican music.

Latin soul (occasionally used synonymously with boogaloo) was a short-lived musical genre that had developed in the 1960s in New York City. It consisted of a blend of Cuban music such as mambo, along with elements of Latin jazz and soul music. Although short-lived, the genre had a very great influence on the growing salsa movement which would dominate the New York Latin music scene in the 1970s. Today, the term is typically used for artists of Hispanic and Latin American descent producing R&B and/or soul music.

Latin soul heavily emphasized its Afro-Cuban rhythms and featured songs sung mainly in English. The style grew out of an attempt on the part of Latin musicians in New York City to expand the reach of their music beyond the local Latin community and into the broader mainstream American society.

== See also ==
- Brown-eyed soul
- Boogaloo
