= Mongo Santamaría =

Afro-Cuban musician (1917–2003)

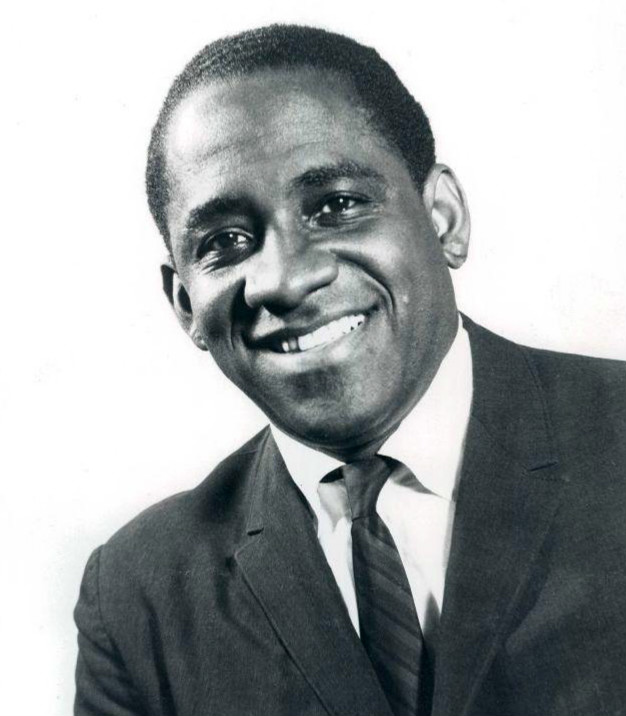
- Santamaría in 1969

Background information
- Born: Ramón Santamaría Rodríguez; April 7, 1917; Havana, Cuba
- Died: February 1, 2003 (aged 85) Miami, Florida, U.S.
- Genres: Pachanga; boogaloo; salsa; Latin jazz
- Occupations: Musician; bandleader; songwriter
- Instruments: Congas; bongos
- Years active: 1950–1998
- Labels: Fantasy; Riverside; Columbia; Vaya; Concord Picante
- Formerly of: Fania All-Stars

Ramón "Mongo" Santamaría Rodríguez (April 7, 1917 – February 1, 2003) was a Cuban percussionist and bandleader who spent most of his career in the United States. Primarily a conga drummer, Santamaría was a leading figure in the pachanga and boogaloo dance crazes of the 1960s. His biggest hit was his rendition of Herbie Hancock's "Watermelon Man", which was inducted into the Grammy Hall of Fame in 1998. From the 1970s, he recorded mainly salsa and Latin jazz, before retiring in the late 1990s.

Santamaría learned to play the congas as an amateur rumba musician in the streets of Havana. He then learned the bongos from Clemente "Chicho" Piquero and toured with various successful bands such as the Lecuona Cuban Boys and Sonora Matancera. In 1950, he moved to New York City, where he became Tito Puente's conguero and in 1957 he joined Cal Tjader's band. He then formed his own charanga, while at the same time recording some of the first rumba and Santería music albums. By the end of the decade, he had his first pachanga hit, "Para ti". He then became a pioneer of boogaloo with "Watermelon Man" and later signed record deals with Columbia, Atlantic and Fania. He collaborated with salsa artists and became a member of the Fania All-Stars, often showcasing his conga solos against Ray Barretto. In his later years, Santamaría recorded mostly Latin jazz for Concord Jazz and Chesky Records.

== Biography ==
=== Rumbero ===
Santamaría learned rumba as a child in the streets of Havana's Jesús María neighborhood. He reminisced: "In the neighborhood where I came from we had all kinds of music, mostly from Africa. We did not leave it alone; we changed it our way. The music we made dealt with religion and conversation. The drum was our tool and we used it for everything". Gerard points out: "Santamaría, like other drummers of his generation, learned music in the streets by observing different drummers. When he started playing professionally, he learned on the job. His approach was utilitarian, not theoretical". Santamaría was mentored on bongos and congas by Clemente "Chicho" Piquero, who played in Beny Moré's band. He recalled: "I would go with Chicho and play the tumbadora and also the [quinto]. I would play everything because I learned a lot from Chicho—because he could play everything".

Santamaría played some of the first recorded folkloric rumbas. Because he recorded for mainstream jazz labels, his folkloric records were consistently available to the public. Santamaría's albums tended to list the personnel and their instruments, and record buyers came to know other Cuban rumberos, such as Armando Peraza, Francisco Aguabella, Julito Collazo, Carlos Vidal Bolado, Modesto Duran and Pablo Mozo. The 10 inch 33 1/3 rpm phonorecord Afro-Cuban Drums by Santamaría was recorded in SMC's New York City studios on November 3, 1952. Santamaría's next recordings with folkloric rumba were on Changó (re-issued as Drums and Chants) recorded in New York (1954). Yambú (1958), Mongo (1959), and Bembé (1960) followed.

Santamaría did not analyze his personal style: "When I play I don't know how I do it, or what I do ... I just play". The following example is an excerpt from a quinto performance by Santamaría on his composition "Mi guaguancó" (1959). The excerpt shows variations on two main motifs, marked as A and B. Santamaría's use of repetition turns the secondary phrase (B), into the primary motif here.

=== Drummer and band leader ===
Santamaría began playing bongos with Septeto Beloña in 1937. In the 1940s he worked in the house band of the prestigious Tropicana nightclub. When Chicho could not go on the tour in Mexico in the late 1940s, he recommended Santamaría for the job. Mexico opened Santamaría up to the wider world beyond his island home. After returning from Mexico in 1950, Santamaría moved to New York City, where he became Tito Puente's conga player. In 1957 Mongo Santamaría joined Cal Tjader's Latin jazz combo.

In 1959 Santamaría recorded his composition "Afro Blue," the first jazz standard built upon a typical African 3:2 cross-rhythm, or hemiola. The song begins with the bass repeatedly playing 6 cross-beats per each measure of 12/8, or 6 cross-beats per 4 main beats—6:4 (two cells of 3:2). The following example shows the original ostinato "Afro Blue" bass line. The slashed noteheads indicate the main beats (not bass notes), where you would normally tap your foot to "keep time."

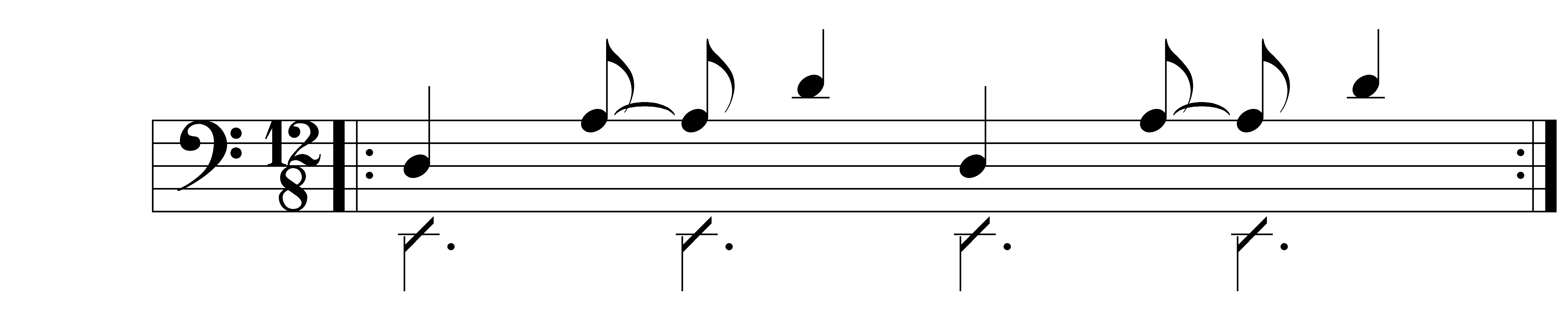
"Afro Blue" bass line with main beats indicated by slashed noteheads

In 1960 Santamaría went to Havana, Cuba with Willie Bobo to record two albums "Mongo in Havana" and "Bembe y Nuestro Hombre En La Habana". After recording, he returned to New York City to form the charanga orquestra La Sabrosa.

In late 1962 Chick Corea had given notice and Santamaría needed a pianist to fill in for the upcoming weekend gigs. Herbie Hancock got the temporary job. Hancock recalls what happened the night that Santamaría discovered "Watermelon Man", the only tune of Santamaría's to reach the top of the pop charts:

[Jazz trumpeter Donald Byrd] came to this supper club to see how I was doing. Anyway, during one of the intermissions, Donald had a conversation with Mongo, something about, "What are the examples of the common thread between Afro-Cuban or Afro-Latin music and African-American jazz?" Mongo said he hadn't really heard a thing that really links it together, he was still searching for it. And I wasn't paying much attention to that conversation, it was a little too heavy for me at the time. But then all of a sudden Donald Byrd says, "Herbie, why don't you play 'Watermelon Man' for Mongo?" And I'm thinking, "What does that have to do with the conversation they're talking about?" I thought it was a little funky jazz tune. So I started playing it, and then Mongo, he got up and he said, "Keep playing it!" He went on the stage, and playing his congas, and it fit like a glove fits on a hand, it just fit perfectly. The bass player looked at my left hand for the bass line, and he learned that. Little by little, the audience was getting up from their tables, and they all got on the dance floor. Pretty soon the dance floor was filled with people, laughing and shrieking, and was having a great time, and they were saying, "This is a hit! This is fantastic!" It was like a movie! So after that, Mongo said "Can I record this?" I said "By all means." And he recorded it, and it became a big hit. That's how it happened.

The sudden success of the song (which Mongo Santamaria recorded on December 17, 1962) propelled Santamaría into his niche of blending Afro-Cuban and African American music. Santamaría went on to record Cuban-flavored versions of popular music R&B and Motown songs.

=== Death ===
On February 1, 2003, Santamaria died in Miami, Florida, after suffering a stroke, at the age of 85. He is buried in Woodlawn Park Cemetery and Mausoleum (now Caballero Rivero Woodlawn Park North Cemetery and Mausoleum) in Miami, Florida.

== Awards and honors ==
Santamaria was inducted into the International Latin Music Hall of Fame in 2000 and the Billboard Latin Music Hall of Fame the following year.

== Discography ==
=== As leader ===
- Afro-Cuban Drums (SMC Pro-Arte, 1952)
- Drums and Chants (Changó) (Vaya, 1954)
- Tambores y Cantos (1955)
- Yambu: Mongo Santamaria y Sus Ritmos Afro Cubano (1958)
- Mongo (Fantasy, 1959)
- Afro Roots (Yambu and Mongo) (Prestige, 1958, 1959)
- Our Man in Havana (1960)
- Mongo en la Habana (Mongo in Havana) (1960) with Carlos Embale and Merceditas Valdés
- Sabroso! (1960)
- !Arriba! La Pachanga (1961)
- Go, Mongo! (1962)
- Watermelon Man! (Battle, 1963)
- Mongo at the Village Gate (Riverside, 1963)
- Mongo Introduces La Lupe (Riverside, 1963)
- Pussy Cat (Columbia, 1965, first with Columbia)
- El Bravo! (1965)
- La Bamba (1965)
- Mongo Explodes (Riverside, 1966)
- Hey! Let's Party (1967)
- Mongo Mania (1967)
- Mongo Santamaria Explodes At The Village Gate (Columbia, 1967)
- Soul Bag (1968)
- Workin' on a Groovy Thing (1969)
- Mongo Soul (Riverside, 1969)
- Afro-American Latin (1969 [rel. 2000]; final album recorded for Columbia)
- Feelin' Alright (Atlantic, 1970 --first of his tenure with Atlantic)
- Mongo '70 (1970)
- Mongo's Way (1971)
- Up from the Roots (1972; final album recorded for Atlantic)
- Fuego (Vaya, 1972 --the beginning of succession of albums w/ Vaya)
- Ubané (1974) with Justo Betancourt on vocals
- Afro-Indio (1975)
- Sofrito (1976)
- Amanecer (1977)
- A la Carte (1978)
- Red Hot (1979)
- You Better Believe It (1979)
- Images (1980)
- Summertime (Pablo Live, 1981)
- Mongo Magic (Roulette, 1982)
- Free Spirit (Espiritu Libre) (Tropical Budda, 1984)
- Soy Yo (1987)
- Live at Jazz Alley (Concord, 1990)
- Mambo Mongo (Chesky, 1993)
- Mongo Returns! (1995)
- Conga Blue (1995)
- Come on Home (1997)
- Mongo Santamaría (1998)

=== As sideman ===
With Fania All-Stars

- 1968 Live at the Red Garter, Vol. 2
- 1974 Latin-Soul-Rock
- 1975 Live at Yankee Stadium, Vol. 1
- 1976 Live at Yankee Stadium, Vol. 2
- 1976 Salsa
- 1977 Rhythm Machine
- 1986 Live in Japan 1976
- 1987 Perfect Blend

With Tito Puente

- 1956 Cuban Carnival
- 1956 Puente Goes Jazz
- 1956 Puente in Percussion
- 1957 Let's Cha Cha with Puente
- 1957 Night Beat
- 1957 Top
- 1959 Mucho Cha-Cha
- 1964 Mucho Puente
- 1992 Live at the Village Gate
- 1994 El Timbral

With Cal Tjader

- 1958 Cal Tjader's Latin Concert
- 1959 A Night at the Black Hawk
- 1959 Concert by the Sea, Vols. 1 & 2
- 1959 Monterey Concerts
- 1962 Latino con Cal Tjader
- 1973 Los Ritmos Calientes
- 1993 Black Orchid

With others

- 1954 Afro, Dizzy Gillespie (Norgran)
- 1958 Plenty of Horn, Paul Horn (Dot)
- 1960 Latinsville!, Victor Feldman (Contemporary)
- 1972 Wild Flower, Hubert Laws (Atlantic)
- 1978 Touchdown, Bob James
- 1989 Strut, Hilton Ruiz
- 1991 The Birth of Soul, Ray Charles
- 1993 Blues + Jazz, Ray Charles
- 1996 Conga Blue, Poncho Sanchez
- 1996 Steve Turre, Steve Turre
