= Pacho Alonso =

Cuban singer and bandleader

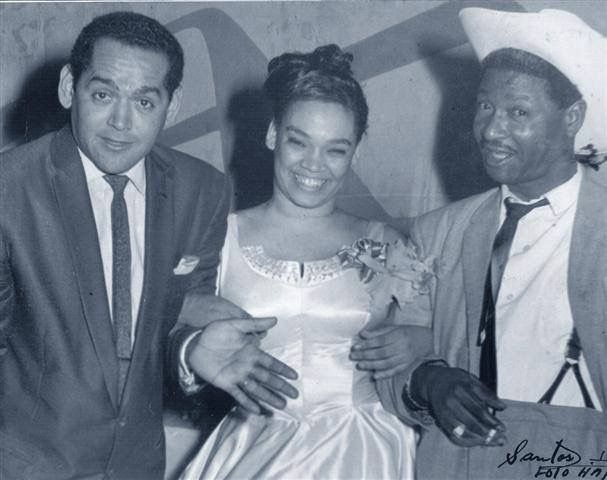
Pacho Alonso (left) with La Lupe and Benny Moré, ca. 1959. All three were signed to the RCA Victor subsidiary Discuba.

Pacho Alonso (August 22, 1928 – August 27, 1982) was a Cuban singer and bandleader from Santiago de Cuba who is attributed with creating the musical form pilón in collaboration with percussionist/composer Enrique Bonne. He founded his first conjunto in Havana in 1957. In the 1950s, Alonso sang with Benny Moré and Fernando Álvarez, a trio popularly known as "The Three Musketeers". Later he sang with Ibrahim Ferrer. Pacho Alonso also enjoyed tremendous success in his international tours through Latin America, Europe and Africa.
