= Orquesta Aragón =

Cuban musical band formed in 1939

- Origin: Cuba
- Genres: Son cubano Danzón; Chachachá
- Years active: 1939–present
- Members: Rafael Antonio Lay Sánchez; Rafael Lay Bravo
- Past members: Rafael Felipe Lay; Orestes Aragón; Filiberto Depestre; Hilario René González; Rufino Roque; Efraín Loyola; Orestes Varona; Noelio Morejón; Pablo Romay; Richard Egües; René Lorente

Orquesta Aragón is a Cuban musical band formed on 30 September 1939, by Orestes Aragón Cantero in Cienfuegos, Cuba. The band originally had the name Ritmica 39, then Ritmica Aragón before settling on its final form. Though they did not create the Cha-cha-cha, they were arguably the best charanga in Cuba during the 1950s and 1960s. Their trade-marks included high-class instrumentalists playing in tight ensemble style, and rhythmical innovations which kept their sound up to date. Over the years they progressed from their start as a danzoneria to play a wider variety of styles, danzón, then cha-cha-cha, then onda-cha, pachanga and son fusions. They still perform today, based in Havana.

== History ==
Originally, the orchestra consisted of eight musicians: Orestes Aragon (double bass), Filiberto Depestre (first violin), Hilario René González (second violin) Rufino Roque (piano), Efraín Loyola (flute), Orestes Varona (timbales), Noelio Morejon (güiro) & Pablo Romay (vocals). With the illness of Aragón in 1949, Rafael Lay Apesteguía became leader, and the band entered its second phase.

In 1950, the orchestra made its first journey to Havana, and in 1953 Lay changed the personnel to suit his own ideas. Around this time, the danzón genre began to fade, and the cha-cha-cha to gain popularity. Flautist was now Rolando Lozano and, later, Richard Egües. Pepe Olmo began singing along with the director Rafael Lay. Pepe Palma joined the orchestra and be its Piano Player for decades onwards. The emergence of Richard Egües on the 5-key wooden flute was significant. Egües replaced Rolando Lozano at the beginning of 1955 when Lozano went to Mexico. In August 1955, Celso Valdés was added on violin and thus the first classic lineup of the Orquesta Aragon was in place. The line-up now was Pepe Olmo and Rafael Lay (vocals), Lay, Filiberto Depestre and Celso Valdés (violins), Pepe Palma (piano), Jose Beltran (d. bass), Panchito Arbolaez (güiro), Orestes Varona (timbales) and Guido Sarria (conga). Lay and Egües were skilled arrangers and composers. Between 1955 and 1958 the Orquesta Aragon released four LPs for RCA, listed below. During this time the Orquesta Aragon recorded nearly 100 numbers for RCA, several of which were never released. These include Macuto, Por esta adoracion, El trago, Gallo y gallina and Cha Cha Cha navideño among others.

In 1958, Pedro Depestre replaced his father Filiberto on violin and in January 1959, Rafael Bacallao was added as a singer. Now the Aragon had three voices, and a unique sound. Bacallao also was a dancer and his dances during their shows always garnered attention and acclaim. Also in 1959, the Orquesta Aragon issued the first of eight LPs with their new line up on the Discuba label (RCA Victor subsidiary).

Cellist Alejandro Tómas Valdés joined the band in the 1960s; a great dancer, he created the onda-cha as a dance which included Brazil’s capoeira, and the music that he also created featured heavy Afro percussion with the traditional sounds of cha-cha-cha.

After the death of Rafael Lay Apesteguía in 1982, Richard Egües became leader, until 1984 when Rafael Lay Bravo took over. Under the younger Lay, the Orquesta established itself as a true institution of inspiration for other Orquestas in dealing with Cuban and Afro-Cuban musical styles. During the revolutionary period, Aragón travelled to give performances in over 30 countries.

== Discography ==
- Cha Cha Cha RCA Victor LP 1130 (1955)
- That Cuban Cha Cha Cha RCA Victor LP 1294 (1956)
- The Heart of Havana RCA Victor LP 1468 (1957)
- Maracas, bongo y conga RCA Victor LP 1609 (1958)
- Danzones de Ayer y de Hoy Discuba DCD 515 (1958)
- Me Voy para la Luna Discuba DCD 520 (originally RCA, 1958)
- Danzones de Ayer y de Hoy Vol 2 Discuba DCD 532 (Originally 1958)
- Cojale el Gusto a Cuba Discuba DCD 502 (originally RCA, 1959)
- Charangas y Pachangas Discuba DCD 555 (1959)
- Ja Ja Ja Pacha Discuba DCD 557 (1961)
- Ultimos exitos de la Orquesta Aragón Discuba DCD 565
- Ritmo Cha-onda (Barbaro, 1978)
- Mosaicos tropicales Discuba DCD 576 (1990)
- La Cubanisima Orquesta Aragon (EGREM, 1992)
- Quien sabe, sabe (EGREM, 1997)
- La Charanga Eterna (EGREM, 1999)
- En Route (EGREM, 2001)
- Por Siempre Aragon (EGREM, 2002)
- The Lusafrica Years (Lusafrica, 2009)
- Cha Cha Chá: Homenaje a lo Tradicional (2021)
