= Daína Chaviano =

Cuban-American writer

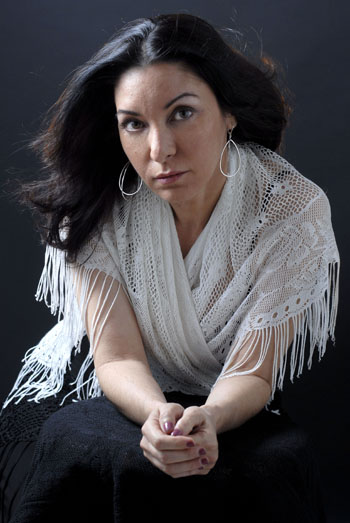
- Born: 19 February 1957 (age 69); Havana, Cuba
- Citizenship: Cuban; American
- Occupation: Novelist
- Relatives: César Évora (cousin)
- Writing career
- Language: Spanish
- Genres: Fantasy, science fiction, historical fiction
- Notable work: The Island of Eternal Love
- Website: www.dainachaviano.com

Daína Chaviano (Spanish: [daˈina tʃaˈβjano]) (born 19 February 1957, Havana) is a Cuban-American writer of French and Asturian descent. She has lived in the United States since 1991.

She is considered one of the three most important female fantasy and science fiction writers in the Spanish language, along with Angélica Gorodischer (Argentina) and Elia Barceló (Spain), forming the so-called “feminine trinity of science fiction in Ibero-America.”

In Cuba, she published several science fiction and fantasy books, becoming the most renowned and best-selling author in those genres in Cuban literature.

== Biography ==
She was born in Havana, the eldest of four children of an economist father, and a mother with two Ph.D.: one in Philosophy and Letters, and the other in Psychology.

When she had barely begun her university studies, she won the first science fiction competition ever organized in Cuba with her short story collection Los mundos que amo (The Worlds I Love), in 1979. After the book was published (1980), the main story was adapted and published as a photonovel in 1982, selling 200,000 copies in 3 months, an unprecedented fact that started her popularity as an author. The plot – almost the same in the short story and its photonovel version – has been considered "an editorial phenomenon" that "questioned the hierarchical structures that the governing institutions of the revolutionary culture imposed in the literary field as early as 1960". This sales record "broke with an editorial logic that considered science fiction as a minor genre."

After earning a bachelor's degree in English Language and Literature at the University of Havana, she established the first science fiction literary workshop in her country, which she named “Oscar Hurtado” in honor of the father of that genre on the Caribbean island.

In 1991, she left Cuba, establishing residency in the United States, where she worked as a translator, columnist, and editor. In 1998, she achieved international recognition when she was awarded the Azorín Prize for Best Novel in Spain for El hombre, la hembra y el hambre. This work forms part of her series «The Occult Side of Havana», together with Casa de juegos, Gata encerrada, and La isla de los amores infinitos (The Island of Eternal Love, Riverhead Books, 2008). The series has been described as “the most coherent novelistic project of its generation, indispensable for understanding the social psychology and spiritual vicissitudes of the Cuban people.” The Island of Eternal Love has been published in 26 languages, making it the most widely translated Cuban novel of all time. In 2007, the novel was awarded the gold medal at the Florida Book Awards, in the category Best Book in Spanish Language.

In 2004, she was the guest of honor at the 25th International Conference for the Fantastic in the Arts (ICFA) in the United States. It was the first time that honor had ever been conferred on a Spanish-language writer. In November 2014, she was the guest of honor during the University Book Fair in Tabasco (Mexico), where she received the Malinalli National Award for the Promotion of Arts, Human Rights, and Cultural Diversity, which until then had only received figures of Mexican culture and society. It was the first time this award was given to an international figure.

Her short story collection, Extraños Testimonios, was published in 2017. In an interview, Chaviano classified the genre of this work as "Caribbean Gothic", as it brings together "elements of horror, absurdity, eroticism, and a certain dose of humor à la Cortázar, amidst tropical and sunny environments, specifically in the Caribbean."

In 2019, her historical thriller Los Hijos de la Diosa Huracán was published by Grijalbo, the Spanish imprint of Penguin Random House. The novel, which required more than a decade of research work, recreates and rescues the Taínos' world, following the trail and paying homage to the legacy of the main Caribbean indigenous culture. Hence the importance of Taino mythology in the novel, especially the symbolism of their three main goddesses: Atabey, Guabancex, and Iguanaboína.

In 2020, the novel was awarded the gold medal at the Florida Book Awards 2019 contest, in the category Best Book in Spanish Language, making Chaviano the only writer to twice receive the award in that category.

Her País de Dragones, which was published in Colombia in 2021, won the Los Mejores de Banco del Libro, an award given to the best books for children and young people published in Spanish anywhere in the world.

Chaviano has been a guest lecturer and visiting author at several universities and colleges, like Denison University (2007), Florida International University (2014), Miami Dade College (2016), and University of North Georgia (2017).

She is a cousin of Cuban actor César Évora.

== Literary influences ==
Her literary influences derive fundamentally from the Celtic world, diverse mythologies, and the principal epics of ancient peoples. Among these sources one can find the Arthurian cycle; Greek, Roman, Egyptian, pre-Columbian, and Afro-Cuban myths; and humankind's first epics, dating back to prehistory, such as the Epic of Gilgamesh, the Mahabharata, the Popol Vuh, the Odyssey, and other similar works.

The author has said she has no affinity with Cuban literature. She has stated that except authors such as Manuel Mujica Laínez and Mario Vargas Llosa, her only point of contact with Latin America is pre-Columbian mythology. Her passion for Anglo-Saxon literature was so strong that, when she entered the university, she decided to major in English literature so that she could read many of these authors in their original language.

Daína Chaviano's works have been described as “bold experiments that break down the boundaries between genres.”

== Works in English ==
- 2019: "Dolores" (short story), trans. by Marilyn G. Miller, in Island in the Light / Isla en la luz (bilingüal anthology of literary works inspired by contemporary Cuban art), ed. by L. Padura, W. Guerra & C. Garaicoa. Miami: tra.Publishing.
- 2017: "Accursed Lineage" (short story), trans. by Matthew David Goodwin, in Latin@ Rising: An Anthology of Latin@ Science Fiction and Fantasy, ed. by Matthew David Goodwin. Texas: Wings Press.
- 2008: The Island of Eternal Love (novel), trans. by Andrea Labinger. New York: Riverhead Books-Penguin Group.
- 2003: "The Annunciation" (short story), trans. by Juan Carlos Toledano, in Andrea L. Bell & Yolanda Molina-Gavilán (eds), Cosmos Latinos: An Anthology of Science Fiction from Latin America and Spain. Connecticut: Wesleyan University Press.
- 1994: "Memo for Freud" (poem), trans. by Heather Rosario-Dievert, in The Year's Best Fantasy and Horror: Seventh Annual Collection, ed. by Ellen Datlow & Terri Windling. New York: St. Martin's Press.
- 1993: "Erotic I", "Memo for Freud", "Erotic IV" (poems), trans. by Heather Rosario-Sievert, in Pleasure in the Word: Erotic Writings by Latin American Women, ed. by Margarite Fernández Olmos & Lizabeth Paravisini-Gebert. New York: White Pine Press.

== Works in Spanish ==
=== Novel ===
- 2019: Los hijos de la Diosa Huracán. Grijalbo, Spain.
- 2006: La isla de los amores infinitos. Grijalbo, Spain.
- 2001: Gata encerrada. Planeta, Spain.
- 1999: Casa de juegos. Planeta, Spain.
- 1998: El hombre, la hembra y el hambre. Planeta, Spain.
- 1988: Fábulas de una abuela extraterrestre. Letras Cubanas, Cuba.

=== Short Fiction ===
- 2017: Extraños testimonios. Huso, Spain. (collection)
- 2015: Un hada en el umbral de La Tierra. El Naranjo. Mexico. (novella)
- 2004: Los mundos que amo. Alfaguara, Bogotá, Colombia. (novella)
- 2001: País de dragones. Espasa Juvenil, Spain. (collection)
- 1990: El abrevadero de los dinosaurios. Letras Cubanas, Cuba. (collection)
- 1986: Historias de hadas para adultos. Letras Cubanas, Cuba. (collection)
- 1983: Amoroso planeta. Letras Cubanas, Cuba. (collection)
- 1980: Los mundos que amo. Ediciones Unión, Cuba. (collection)

=== Poetry ===
- 1994: Confesiones eróticas y otros hechizos. Editorial Betania, Spain.

=== Film Script ===
- 1989: La anunciación. Editorial Extensión Universitaria, Cuba.

== Awards and Recognitions ==
- 2022: Winner at Los Mejores de Banco del Libro (Venezuela), for País de dragones.
- 2020: First Place in two categories (Best Popular Fiction and Best Novel Adventure or Drama in Spanish) in the International Latino Book Awards, for Los hijos de la Diosa Huracán.
- 2020: Gold Medal Winner in the Florida Book Awards 2019, for Best Spanish Language Book (USA), for Los hijos de la Diosa Huracán.
- 2017: Guest of Honor at the 12th North American Science Fiction Convention (San Juan, Puerto Rico).
- 2014: Malinalli National Award 2014 for the Promotion of Arts, Human Rights, and Cultural Diversity (Mexico).
- 2014: Guest of Honor at the Tabasco University Book Fair (Mexico).
- 2010: International Dublin Literary Award IMPAC Longlist for The Island of Eternal Love.
- 2008: Finalist of the Prix Relay du Roman d'Évasion (France), for L'île des amours éternelles (The Island of Eternal Love).
- 2007: Gold Medal Winner in the Florida Book Awards 2006, for Best Spanish Language Book (USA), for La Isla de los amores infinitos (The Island of Eternal Love).
- 2004: Guest of Honor at the 25th Conference held by the International Association for the Fantastic in the Arts, Fort Lauderdale (USA).
- 2003: Goliardos Fantasy International Award (Mexico), for Fábulas de una abuela extraterrestre.
- 1998: Azorín Prize for Best Novel (Spain), for El hombre, la hembra y el hambre.
- 1990: Anna Seghers Award, Academy of Arts in Berlin (Germany), for Fábulas de una abuela extraterrestre.
- 1989: "La Edad de Oro" (The Golden Age) National Prize for Children's and Young People's Literature (Cuba), for País de dragones.
- 1988: "13 de marzo", Best Literary Film Script (Cuba), for La anunciación.
- 1979: David National Prize for Best SF Book (Cuba), for Los mundos que amo.

== See also ==
- Cuban American literature
- List of Cuban-American writers
