= Tico Records =

- Founded: 1948
- Founder: George Goldner

Tico Records was a New York City record label that was founded in 1948, and was known for 30 years as the "home of the recorded mambo". It was originally owned by George Goldner and later acquired by Morris Levy and incorporated into Roulette Records. It specialized in Latin music and was significant for introducing artists such as Ismael Rivera, Ray Barretto and Tito Puente. In 1974, it was sold to Fania Records and stopped issuing new releases in 1981; however, the label's extensive catalog continues to be reissued under the Tico Records name.

Nightclub owner Goldner started Tico Records in the 1940s after realizing there was no record label dedicated to Latin ballroom dancing music. In 2023, a compilation album, Hit The Bongo! The Latin Soul Of Tico Records, was released to celebrate the label's 75th anniversary.

== See also ==
- List of record labels
