= List of American films of 1999 =

This is a list of American films released in 1999.

== Box office ==
The highest-grossing American films released in 1999, by domestic box office gross revenue, are as follows:

Highest-grossing films of 1999
Rank	Title	Distributor	Domestic gross
1	Star Wars: Episode I – The Phantom Menace	20th Century Fox	$431,088,295
2	The Sixth Sense	Disney	$293,506,292
3	Toy Story 2	Disney	$245,852,179
4	Austin Powers: The Spy Who Shagged Me	New Line Cinema	$206,040,086
5	The Matrix	Warner Bros. Pictures	$171,479,930
6	Tarzan	Disney	$171,091,819
7	Big Daddy	Sony Pictures	$163,479,795
8	The Mummy	Universal Pictures	$157,138,535
9	Runaway Bride	Paramount Pictures	$152,257,509
10	The Blair Witch Project	Artisan Entertainment	$140,539,099

== January–March ==
Opening		Title	Production company	Cast and crew	Ref.
J A N U A R Y	12	Our Friend, Martin	20th Century Fox Home Entertainment / DIC Entertainment, L.P.	Rob Smiley, Vincenzo Trippetti (directors); Dawn Comer, Chris Simmons, Sib Ventress, Deborah Pratt (screenplay); Robert Ri'chard, Lucas Black, Dexter King, Jaleel White, Jessica Garcia, Ed Asner, Angela Bassett, Danny Glover, Whoopi Goldberg, Samuel L. Jackson, James Earl Jones, Ashley Judd, Richard Kind, Susan Sarandon, John Travolta, Oprah Winfrey, LeVar Burton, Yolanda King, Adam Wylie, Frank Welker, Jess Harnell, Joe Lala, John Wesley, Jodi Carlisle, Theodore Borders, Zachary Leigh, Nicole Palacio, Elizabeth Primm	
J A N U A R Y	15	At First Sight	Metro-Goldwyn-Mayer	Irwin Winkler (director); Steve Levitt (screenplay); Val Kilmer, Mira Sorvino, Kelly McGillis, Steven Weber, Bruce Davison, Nathan Lane, Drena De Niro	
J A N U A R Y	15	In Dreams	DreamWorks	Neil Jordan (director/screenplay); Bruce Robinson (screenplay); Annette Bening, Aidan Quinn, Stephen Rea, Robert Downey Jr., Paul Guilfoyle, John Fiore, Ken Cheeseman, Dennis Boutsikaris, Margo Martindale, Katie Sagona, Pamela Payton-Wright, Geoffrey Wigdor	
J A N U A R Y	15	Varsity Blues	Paramount Pictures / MTV Productions	Brian Robbins (director); W. Peter Iliff (screenplay); James Van Der Beek, Jon Voight, Amy Smart, Paul Walker, Scott Caan, Ali Larter, Ron Lester, Eliel Swinton, Richard Lineback, Thomas F. Duffy, Joe Pichler, Tonie Perensky, James N. Harrell, Jesse Plemons, Barry Switzer, Eric Jungmann, Marco Perella, Tony Frank, John Gatins, Ryan Donowho	
J A N U A R Y	15	Virus	Universal Pictures / Mutual Film Company / Valhalla Motion Pictures / Dark Horse Entertainment	John Bruno (director); Dennis Feldman, Chuck Pfarrer (screenplay); Jamie Lee Curtis, Donald Sutherland, William Baldwin, Joanna Pacuła, Marshall Bell, Sherman Augustus, Cliff Curtis, Julio Oscar Mechoso	
J A N U A R Y	22	Gloria	Columbia Pictures / Mandalay Entertainment	Sidney Lumet (director); John Cassavetes, Steve Antin (screenplay); Sharon Stone, Jean-Luke Figueroa, Jeremy Northam, Cathy Moriarty, George C. Scott, Mike Starr, Bonnie Bedelia, Barry McEvoy, Don Billett, Jerry Dean, Tony DiBenedetto, Teddy Atlas, Bobby Cannavale, Sarita Choudhury, Miriam Colon	
J A N U A R Y	29	The 24 Hour Woman	Artisan Entertainment	Nancy Savoca (director/screenplay); Richard Guay (screenplay); Rosie Perez, Marianne Jean-Baptiste, Patti LuPone, Karen Duffy, Diego Serrano, Wendell Pierce, Melissa Leo, Chris Cooper	
J A N U A R Y	29	She's All That	Miramax Films / Tapestry Films / Film Colony	Robert Iscove (director); R. Lee Fleming Jr. (screenplay); Freddie Prinze Jr., Rachael Leigh Cook, Matthew Lillard, Paul Walker, Jodi Lyn O'Keefe, Kevin Pollak, Anna Paquin, Kieran Culkin, Kimberly "Lil' Kim" Jones, Usher Raymond, Elden Henson, Gabrielle Union, Dulé Hill, Tamara Mello, Clea DuVall, Tim Matheson, Alexis Arquette, Chris Owen, Vanessa Lee Chester, Milo Ventimiglia, Takbir Bashir, Brandon Mychal Smith, Flex Alexander, Debbi Morgan, Carlos Jacott, Michael Milhoan, Patricia Charbonneau, Katharine Towne, Sarah Michelle Gellar	
F E B R U A R Y	5	Payback	Paramount Pictures / Icon Productions	Brian Helgeland (director/screenplay); Terry Hayes (screenplay); Mel Gibson, Gregg Henry, Maria Bello, William Devane, James Coburn, Lucy Liu, David Paymer, Kris Kristofferson, Deborah Kara Unger, Bill Duke, Jack Conley, John Glover, Trevor St. John, Freddy Rodriguez, Manu Tupou, Len Bajenski	
F E B R U A R Y	5	Simply Irresistible	20th Century Fox / Regency Enterprises	Mark Tarlov (director); Judith Roberts (screenplay); Sarah Michelle Gellar, Sean Patrick Flanery, Patricia Clarkson, Dylan Baker, Lawrence Gilliard Jr., Christopher Durang, Betty Buckley, Amanda Peet	
F E B R U A R Y	12	Blast from the Past	New Line Cinema	Hugh Wilson (director); Bill Kelly (screenplay); Brendan Fraser, Alicia Silverstone, Christopher Walken, Sissy Spacek, Dave Foley, Joey Slotnick, Dale Raoul, Rex Linn, Nathan Fillion, Jenifer Lewis, Wendel Meldrum, Donovan Scott, Hugh Wilson, John Roselius, Jazzmun, Todd Susman, Sonya Eddy, Cynthia Mace, Harry S. Murphy, Bill Gratton, Don Yesso, Steve Bean, Todd Robert Anderson, Michael Gallagher, Carmen Moré, Deborah Kellner, Mary Ann Hermansen, Brian Blondell	
F E B R U A R Y	12	Message in a Bottle	Warner Bros. Pictures / Bel-Air Entertainment	Luis Mandoki (director); Gerald Di Pego (screenplay); Kevin Costner, Robin Wright, Paul Newman, John Savage, Illeana Douglas, Robbie Coltrane, Jesse James, Bethel Leslie, Tom Aldredge, Hayden Panettiere, Rosemary Murphy	
F E B R U A R Y	12	My Favorite Martian	Walt Disney Pictures	Donald Petrie (director); Sherri Stoner, Deanna Oliver (screenplay); Jeff Daniels, Christopher Lloyd, Elizabeth Hurley, Daryl Hannah, Wallace Shawn, Christine Ebersole, Michael Lerner, Ray Walston, Shelley Malil, Jeremy Hotz, T. K. Carter, Steven Anthony Lawrence, Michael Chieffo, Troy Evans, Arthur Senzy, Charles Chun, Michael Dempsey, David St. James, Ken Thorley, Barry Pearl, Buck Kartalian, Steve Bond, Michael Bailey Smith, Rick Kleber, Debra Christofferson, Pamela Gordon, Beau Billingslea, Wayne Knight	
F E B R U A R Y	14	Stephen King's Storm of the Century	ABC / Mark Carliner Productions / Greengrass Productions	Craig R. Baxley (director); Stephen King (screenplay); Tim Daly, Colm Feore, Debrah Farentino, Casey Siemaszko, Jeffrey DeMunn, Spencer Breslin, Denis Forest, Nicky Guadagni, Julianne Nicholson, Soo Garay, Skye McCole Bartusiak, Ron Perkins, Becky Ann Baker, Kathleen Chalfant, Myra Carter, Adam Zolotin, Torri Higginson, Kay Tremblay, Adam LeFevre, Peter MacNeill, Gerard Parkes, Jeremy Jordan, Lynne Griffin, Stephen King, Dyllan Christopher, Nada Despotovich, Cayda Rubin, Nancy Beatty, Richard Fitzpatrick, Rita Tuckett, Christopher Marren, Tyler Bannerman, Gaylyn Britton, Michael Rhoades, Steve Rankin, Stephen Joffe, Beth Dixon, Leif Anderson, Marcia Laskowski, Harley English-Dixon, Richard Blackburn	
F E B R U A R Y	19	Jawbreaker	TriStar Pictures	Darren Stein (director/screenplay); Rose McGowan, Rebecca Gayheart, Julie Benz, Judy Greer, Chad Christ, Charlotte Ayanna, Ethan Erickson, Pam Grier, Carol Kane, Marilyn Manson, Tatyana Ali, William Katt, P. J. Soles, Jeff Conaway, Sandy Martin	
F E B R U A R Y	19	October Sky	Universal Pictures	Joe Johnston (director); Lewis Colick (screenplay); Jake Gyllenhaal, Chris Cooper, Chris Owen, Laura Dern, William Lee Scott, Chad Lindberg, Natalie Canerday, Randy Stripling, Chris Ellis, Elya Baskin, O. Winston Link, Andy Stahl, Don G. Campbell	
F E B R U A R Y	19	Office Space	20th Century Fox	Mike Judge (director/screenplay); Ron Livingston, Jennifer Aniston, Stephen Root, Gary Cole, David Herman, Ajay Naidu, Diedrich Bader, John C. McGinley, Joe Bays, Alexandra Wentworth, Richard Riehle, Paul Willson, Kinna McInroe, Todd Duffey, Greg Pitts, Mike McShane, Orlando Jones, Mike Judge, Jack Betts	
F E B R U A R Y	26	20 Dates	Phoenician Films	Myles Berkowitz (director/screenplay); Myles Berkowitz, Elisabeth Wagner, Richard Arlook, Tia Carrere, Robert McKee, Elie Samaha	
F E B R U A R Y	26	200 Cigarettes	Paramount Pictures / Lakeshore Entertainment / MTV Productions	Risa Bramon Garcia (director); Shana Larsen (screenplay); Ben Affleck, Casey Affleck, Dave Chappelle, Guillermo Díaz, Angela Featherstone, Janeane Garofalo, Gaby Hoffmann, Kate Hudson, Courtney Love, Jay Mohr, Martha Plimpton, Christina Ricci, Paul Rudd, Catherine Kellner, Brian McCardie, Nicole Ari Parker, Elvis Costello, David Johansen, Caleb Carr, Alice Dinnean	
F E B R U A R Y	26	8mm	Columbia Pictures	Joel Schumacher (director); Andrew Kevin Walker (screenplay); Nicolas Cage, Joaquin Phoenix, James Gandolfini, Peter Stormare, Anthony Heald, Chris Bauer, Catherine Keener, Myra Carter, Amy Morton, Jenny Powell, Jack Betts, Luis Oropeza, Don Creech, Norman Reedus, Fran Bennett, Luis Saguar, Suzy Nakamura, Torsten Voges, Mario Ernesto Sánchez, Bob Clendenin	
F E B R U A R Y	26	The Breaks	Artisan Entertainment	Eric Meza (director); Mitch Mullany, Jeff Stolzer (screenplay); Mitch Mullany, Paula Bel, Paul Benjamin, Lamont Bentley	
F E B R U A R Y	26	Just the Ticket	United Artists	Richard Menk (director/screenplay); Andy Garcia, Andie MacDowell, Richard Bradford, Alice Drummond, Louis Mustillo, Patrick Breen, Laura Harris, Don Novello, Ron Leibman, Michael Willis, Jack Cafferty, Abe Vigoda, Michael P. Moran, Ronald Guttman, Helen Carey, Bobo Lewis, Irene Worth, Lenny Venito, Anthony DeSando, Elizabeth Ashley, Sully Boyar, Joe Frazier, Eugene Greytak, Bill Irwin	
F E B R U A R Y	26	The Other Sister	Touchstone Pictures	Garry Marshall (director/screenplay); Bob Brunner (screenplay); Juliette Lewis, Diane Keaton, Tom Skerritt, Giovanni Ribisi, Poppy Montgomery, Sarah Paulson, Linda Thorson, Joe Flanigan, Juliet Mills, Tracy Reiner, Hector Elizondo	
F E B R U A R Y	27	Lansky	HBO Pictures	John McNaughton (director); Uri Dan, Dennis Eisenberg, Eli Landau, David Mamet (screenplay); Richard Dreyfuss, Eric Roberts, Max Perlich, Matthew Settle, Illeana Douglas, Ryan Merriman, Jeff Perry, Bert Remsen, Ron Perkins, Stanley DeSantis, Beverly D'Angelo, Anthony LaPaglia, Larry Moss, Christopher Marquette, Bill Capizzi, Ron Gilbert, James Harper, Dean Norris, John Gavigan, Robert Miano, Octavia Spencer, Tom Towles, Tom Dreesen, Francis Guinan, Peter Dobson, Phil Reeves, Lynne Marie Stewart, Maury Ginsberg, Mickey Knox, Yosef Carmon, Mosko Alkalai, Paul Sincoff, Fima Noveck, Joshua Praw, Bernard Hiller, Jill Holden, Benjamin Kimball Smith, Anthony Medwetz, Scott Rabinowitz, Nick Corello, Tom La Grua, Sal Landi, Peggy Jo Jacobs	
M A R C H	5	Analyze This	Warner Bros. Pictures / Village Roadshow Pictures	Harold Ramis (director/screenplay); Kenneth Lonergan, Peter Tolan (screenplay); Robert De Niro, Billy Crystal, Lisa Kudrow, Chazz Palminteri, Joe Viterelli, Joseph Rigano, Molly Shannon, Max Casella, Bill Macy, Rebecca Schull, Pat Cooper, Leo Rossi, Aasif Mandvi, Tony Darrow, Elizabeth Bracco, Judith Kahan, Pasquale Cajano, Tony Bennett, Richard C. Castellano, Ira Wheeler	
M A R C H	5	Cruel Intentions	Columbia Pictures	Roger Kumble (director/screenplay); Sarah Michelle Gellar, Ryan Phillippe, Reese Witherspoon, Selma Blair, Louise Fletcher, Joshua Jackson, Eric Mabius, Sean Patrick Thomas, Swoosie Kurtz, Christine Baranski, Alaina Reed Hall, Deborah Offner, Tara Reid, Hiep Thi Le, Herta Ware, Drew Snyder, Charlie O'Connell, Fred Norris	
M A R C H	5	Lock, Stock and Two Smoking Barrels	PolyGram Filmed Entertainment/Summit Entertainment	Guy Ritchie (director/screenplay); Jason Flemyng, Dexter Fletcher, Nick Moran, Jason Statham, Steven Mackintosh, Vinnie Jones, Nicholas Rowe, Lenny McLean, P. H. Moriarty, Frank Harper, Sting, Huggy Leaver, Stephen Marcus, Vas Blackwood, Vera Day, Alan Ford, Danny John-Jules, Victor McGuire, Rob Brydon, Steve Collins	
M A R C H	12	Baby Geniuses	TriStar Pictures	Bob Clark (director/screenplay); Greg Michael (screenplay); Kathleen Turner, Christopher Lloyd, Kim Cattrall, Peter MacNicol, Dom DeLuise, Ruby Dee, Kyle Howard, Jim Hanks, Sam McMurray, Leo, Gerry and Myles Fitzgerald, Miko Hughes, Scarlett Pomers, Seth Adkins, Scotty Leavenworth, Brianna and Britney McConnell, Gabrielle and Megan Robbins, Jacob and Zachary Handy, Griffen and Connor Legget, Amanda and Caitlin Fein, Lexi Thomas, Aaron Spann, Ashli Adams	
M A R C H	12	The Corruptor	New Line Cinema	James Foley (director); Robert Pucci (screenplay); Chow Yun-fat, Mark Wahlberg, Ric Young, Paul Ben-Victor, Elizabeth Lindsey, Brian Cox, Byron Mann, Kim Chan, Marie Matiko, Tim Progosh, Byron Lawson, Beau Starr, Frank Pellegrino, Tovah Feldshuh, Chuck Scarborough, Lucille Soong, Jon Kit Lee, Andrew Pang, Bill MacDonald, Susie Trinh, Ho Chow, Olivia Yap, Lynda Chiu, Pak-Kwong Ho	
M A R C H	12	The Deep End of the Ocean	Columbia Pictures / Mandalay Entertainment	Ulu Grosbard (director); Stephen Schiff (screenplay); Michelle Pfeiffer, Treat Williams, Whoopi Goldberg, Jonathan Jackson, Ryan Merriman, Alexa Vega, Michael McGrady, Brenda Strong, Michael McElroy, Tony Musante, Rose Gregorio, John Kapelos, Lucinda Jenney, John Roselius, K.K. Dodds, Robert Cicchini, Frank Marocco, Wayne Duvall, Nancy Sullivan, Timothy Davis-Reed, Robert Clotworthy, Cory Buck, Joey Simmrin, Holly Towne, Olivia Summers	
M A R C H	12	The Rage: Carrie 2	United Artists	Katt Shea (director); Rafael Moreu (screenplay); Emily Bergl, Jason London, Dylan Bruno, J. Smith-Cameron, Amy Irving, Zachery Ty Bryan, John Doe, Charlotte Ayanna, Rachel Blanchard, Justin Urich, Mena Suvari, Elijah Craig, Eddie Kaye Thomas, Clint Jordan, Kate Skinner, Gordon Clapp, Steven Ford, Deborah Meschan, Katt Shea, Robert D. Raiford, Rhoda Griffis, Sissy Spacek	
M A R C H	12	Wing Commander	20th Century Fox	Chris Roberts (director/screenplay); Kevin Droney (screenplay); Freddie Prinze Jr., Saffron Burrows, Matthew Lillard, Tchéky Karyo, Jürgen Prochnow, David Suchet, David Warner, Ginny Holder, Hugh Quarshie, Ken Bones, John McGlynn, Richard Dillane, Mark Powley, David Fahm, Mark Hamill, Simon MacCorkindale, Craig Kelly, Fraser James, Kieron Phipps, Raffaello Degruttola, Chris Roberts	
M A R C H	19	Forces of Nature	DreamWorks	Bronwen Hughes (director); Marc Lawrence (screenplay); Ben Affleck, Sandra Bullock, Maura Tierney, Steve Zahn, Blythe Danner, Ronny Cox, Michael Fairman, Richard Schiff, Afemo Omilami, David Strickland, Jack Kehler, Janet Carroll, Meredith Scott Lynn, George D. Wallace, Steve Hytner, John Doe, Anne Haney, Bert Remsen, Bill Irwin	
M A R C H	19	The King and I	Warner Bros. Pictures / Morgan Creek Productions	Richard Rich (director); Peter Bakalian, Jacqueline Feather, David Seidler (screenplay); Martin Vidnovic, Miranda Richardson, Ian Richardson, Darrell Hammond, Adam Wylie, Kenny Baker, Ed Trotta, Anthony Modzy, Brian Tochi, Katie Lai, Christiane Noll, David Burnham, Tracy Venner Warren, Allen D. Hong, Armi Arabe, Sean Smith, J.A. Fujii, Alexandra Lai, Katherine Lai, Mark Hunt, Kevin Yungman, Robert McEvilly	
M A R C H	19	Ravenous	20th Century Fox / Fox 2000 Pictures	Antonia Bird (director); Ted Griffin (screenplay); Guy Pearce, Robert Carlyle, Jeremy Davies, Jeffrey Jones, David Arquette, John Spencer, Stephen Spinella, Neal McDonough, Joseph Runningfox, Sheila Tousey, Bill Brochtrup, Fernando Becerril, Gabriel Berthier, Pedro Altamirano, Damian Delgado, Tim Van Rellim, Miezi Sungu, David Heyman	
M A R C H	19	True Crime	Warner Bros. Pictures	Clint Eastwood (director); Larry Gross (screenplay); Clint Eastwood, Isaiah Washington, LisaGay Hamilton, James Woods, Denis Leary, Bernard Hill, Diane Venora, Michael McKean, Michael Jeter, Mary McCormack, Hattie Winston, Penny Bae Bridges, Francesca Eastwood, John Finn, Laila Robins, Sydney Poitier, Erik King, Graham Beckel, Frances Fisher, Marissa Ribisi, Christine Ebersole, Anthony Zerbe, Nancy Giles, Tom McGowan, William Windom, Lucy Liu, Dina Eastwood, Leslie Griffith, Dennis Richmond, Frank Somerville, Frances Lee McCain, Rev. Cecil Williams, Jack Kehler, Colman Domingo, Kelvin Han Yee, Bill Wattenburg, Don West, Casey Lee, George Maguire	
M A R C H	20	Earthly Possessions	HBO Pictures	James Lapine (director); Steven Rogers (screenplay); Susan Sarandon, Stephen Dorff, Elisabeth Moss, Jay O. Sanders, Margo Martindale, Boyd Gaines, Deborah Rush, John Christopher Jones, Robert Prescott, Kevin Chamberlin, Alice Drummond, William Duell, Claudia Shear, Tom Aldredge, Eva Amurri, Terry Serpico, Raynor Scheine, Jay Boryea, Barbara J. Spence, Alan Pottinger, Marge Redmond	
M A R C H	26	Doug's 1st Movie	Walt Disney Pictures / Jumbo Pictures	Maurice Joyce (director); Ken Scarborough (screenplay); Thomas McHugh, Fred Newman, Chris Phillips, Constance Shulman, Frank Welker, Doug Preis, Guy Hadley, Alice Playten, Eddie Korbich, David O'Brien, Doris Belack, Becca Lish, Greg Lee, Bob Bottone, Bruce Bayley Johnson, Fran Brill, Melissa Greenspan, Rodger Bumpass, Paul Eiding, Jackie Gonneau, Sherry Lynn, Mickie McGowan, Phil Proctor, Brianne Siddall, Claudette Wells	
M A R C H	26	EDtv	Universal Pictures / Imagine Entertainment	Ron Howard (director); Lowell Ganz, Babaloo Mandel (screenplay); Matthew McConaughey, Jenna Elfman, Woody Harrelson, Elizabeth Hurley, Dennis Hopper, Ellen DeGeneres, Martin Landau, Rob Reiner, Sally Kirkland, Viveka Davis, Adam Goldberg, Wendle Josepher, Merrin Dungey, Ian Gomez, Clint Howard, RuPaul, Rick Overton, Gedde Watanabe, Alexandra Holden, Donnie Most, Geoffrey Blake, Harry Shearer, Michael Moore, Merrill Markoe, George Plimpton, Bill Maher, Jay Leno, Arianna Huffington	
M A R C H	26	The Mod Squad	Metro-Goldwyn-Mayer	Scott Silver (director/screenplay); Stephen Kay, Kate Lanier (screenplay); Claire Danes, Omar Epps, Giovanni Ribisi, Dennis Farina, Josh Brolin, Steve Harris, Michael Lerner, Richard Jenkins, Larry Brandenburg, Lionel Mark Smith, Sam McMurray, Michael O'Neill, Stephen Kay, Bodhi Elfman, Holmes Osborne, Dey Young, Eddie Griffin, Clarence Williams III, Peggy Lipton	
M A R C H	31	10 Things I Hate About You	Touchstone Pictures	Gil Junger (director); Karen McCullah, Kirsten Smith (screenplay); Julia Stiles, Heath Ledger, Joseph Gordon-Levitt, Larisa Oleynik, Larry Miller, Andrew Keegan, David Krumholtz, Susan May Pratt, Gabrielle Union, Daryl Mitchell, Allison Janney, David Leisure, Kyle Cease, Letters to Cleo, Greg Jackson, Save Ferris	
M A R C H	31	The Matrix	Warner Bros. Pictures / Village Roadshow Pictures / Silver Pictures	The Wachowskis (directors/screenplay); Keanu Reeves, Laurence Fishburne, Carrie-Anne Moss, Hugo Weaving, Joe Pantoliano, Marcus Chong, Anthony Ray Parker, Julian Arahanga, Matt Doran, Gloria Foster, Belinda McClory, Paul Goddard, Robert Taylor, David Aston, Ada Nicodemou	

== April–June ==
Opening		Title	Production company	Cast and crew	Ref.
A P R I L	2	Cookie's Fortune	October Films	Robert Altman (director); Anne Rapp (screenplay); Glenn Close, Julianne Moore, Liv Tyler, Chris O'Donnell, Ned Beatty, Courtney B. Vance, Charles S. Dutton, Patricia Neal, Donald Moffat, Lyle Lovett, Matt Malloy, Randle Mell, Niecy Nash, Rufus Thomas, Ruby Wilson, Danny Darst, Preston Strobel, Anne Whitfield	
A P R I L	2	The Out-of-Towners	Paramount Pictures	Sam Weisman (director); Marc Lawrence (screenplay); Steve Martin, Goldie Hawn, John Cleese, Mark McKinney, Oliver Hudson, William Duell, Anne Haney, Mo Gaffney, Mary Testa, Josh Mostel, Gregory Jbara, Cynthia Nixon, Joseph Maher, Constance McCashin, Ernie Sabella, John Pizzarelli, Mayor Rudolph Giuliani, Scotty Bloch, Joe Grifasi, Jack McGee, Jessica Cauffiel	
A P R I L	2	A Walk on the Moon	Miramax Films / Village Roadshow Pictures	Tony Goldwyn (director); Pamela Gray (screenplay); Diane Lane, Viggo Mortensen, Liev Schreiber, Anna Paquin, Tovah Feldshuh, Bobby Boriello, Julie Kavner, Mahee Paiement, Star Jasper, Ellen David, Lisa Bronwyn Moore, Lisa Jakub, Joseph Perrino, Stewart Bick	
A P R I L	9	Foolish	Artisan Entertainment / No Limit Films	Dave Meyers (director); Eddie Griffin (screenplay); Master P, Eddie Griffin, Amie Petersen, Frank Sivero, Daphne Duplaix, Jonathan Banks, Andrew Dice Clay, Sven-Ole Thorsen, Marla Gibbs, Traci Bingham, Bill Nunn, Clifton Powell, A.J. Johnson, Traequon Tolbert	
A P R I L	9	Go	Columbia Pictures	Doug Liman (director); John August (screenplay); William Fichtner, Katie Holmes, Jay Mohr, Sarah Polley, Scott Wolf, Taye Diggs, Breckin Meyer, Timothy Olyphant, Desmond Askew, Jane Krakowski, J. E. Freeman, Melissa McCarthy, Nathan Bexton, Tony Denman, James Duval, Jimmy Shubert, Tane McClure, Suzanne Krull, Natasha Melnick, Zoe Cunningham, Manu Intiraymi, Robert Peters	
A P R I L	9	Never Been Kissed	20th Century Fox / Fox 2000 Pictures	Raja Gosnell (director); Abby Kohn, Marc Silverstein (screenplay); Drew Barrymore, David Arquette, Michael Vartan, Molly Shannon, John C. Reilly, Leelee Sobieski, Jeremy Jordan, Jessica Alba, Jordan Ladd, Marley Shelton, Garry Marshall, James Franco, Cory Hardrict, Marissa Jaret Winokur, Giuseppe Andrews, Alex Solowitz, Octavia Spencer, Cress Williams, Sean Whalen, Martha Hackett, Jenny Bicks, Denny Kirkwood, Maya McLaughlin, Branden Williams, Katie Lansdale	
A P R I L	16	Friends & Lovers	Laguna Entertainment	George Haas (director/screenplay); Neill Barry (screenplay); Stephen Baldwin, Claudia Schiffer, Robert Downey Jr., Danny Nucci, George Newbern, Alison Eastwood, Neill Barry, Suzanne Cryer, David Rasche, Leon, Ann Magnuson, Jamie Luner	
A P R I L	16	Goodbye Lover	Warner Bros. Pictures / Regency Enterprises	Roland Joffé (director); Ron Peer, Joel Cohen, Alec Sokolow (screenplay); Patricia Arquette, Dermot Mulroney, Ellen DeGeneres, Mary-Louise Parker, Don Johnson, Ray McKinnon, Alex Rocco, Andre Gregory, John Neville, JoNell Kennedy, Nina Siemaszko, Lisa Eichhorn, George Furth, Barry Newman, Max Perlich, John Prosky, Richard T. Jones, Frances Bay, Ernie Lively, Danny Goldring, Leslie Jordan, Lou Myers, Lee Weaver, Vincent Gallo, Will Stewart, David Brisbin	
A P R I L	16	Life	Universal Pictures / Imagine Entertainment	Ted Demme (director); Robert Ramsey, Matthew Stone (screenplay); Eddie Murphy, Martin Lawrence, Obba Babatundé, Ned Beatty, Bernie Mac, Miguel A. Nunez Jr., Clarence Williams III, Barry Shabaka Henley, Brent Jennings, Guy Torry, Nick Cassavetes, Bokeem Woodbine, Anthony Anderson, Michael Taliferro, Sanaa Lathan, O'Neal Compton, Noah Emmerich, Rick James, R. Lee Ermey, Ned Vaughn, Heavy D, Kenn Whitaker, Bonz Malone, Lisa Nicole Carson, Poppy Montgomery, Johnny Brown, Don Harvey	
A P R I L	16	The Winslow Boy	Sony Pictures Classics	David Mamet (director/screenplay); Nigel Hawthorne, Jeremy Northam, Rebecca Pidgeon, Gemma Jones, Guy Edwards, Matthew Pidgeon, Aden Gillett, Colin Stinton, Sarah Flind, Neil North	
A P R I L	17	The Jack Bull	HBO Pictures	John Badham (director); Dick Cusack, John Pogue (screenplay); John Cusack, John Goodman, L. Q. Jones, Miranda Otto, John C. McGinley, John Savage, Rodney A. Grant, Kurt Fuller, Rex Linn, Jay O. Sanders, Drake Bell, Duncan Fraser, Ken Pogue, Nicholas E. Gillie, Glenn Morshower, Ned Bellamy, Brent Briscoe, Scott Wilson, John Payne, Corry Glass Lowry, Byrne Piven, Dick Cusack, Jimmy Herman, Tom Heaton, Campbell Lane	
A P R I L	23	Election	Paramount Pictures / MTV Productions	Alexander Payne (director/screenplay); Jim Taylor (screenplay); Matthew Broderick, Reese Witherspoon, Chris Klein, Jessica Campbell, Mark Harelik, Phil Reeves, Molly Hagan, Colleen Camp, Nicholas D'Agosto, Holmes Osborne, Matt Malloy, Frankie Ingrassia, Jeanine Jackson, Delaney Driscoll	
A P R I L	23	Existenz	Dimension Films / Alliance Atlantis / Serendipity Point Films	David Cronenberg (director/screenplay); Jennifer Jason Leigh, Jude Law, Ian Holm, Don McKellar, Callum Keith Rennie, Sarah Polley, Christopher Eccleston, Willem Dafoe, Robert A. Silverman, Oscar Hsu, Kris Lemche, Vik Sahay	
A P R I L	23	Lost & Found	Warner Bros. Pictures / Alcon Entertainment	Jeff Pollack (director); J.B. Cook, Mark Meeks, David Spade (screenplay); David Spade, Sophie Marceau, Martin Sheen, Patrick Bruel, Artie Lange, Mitchell Whitfield, Martin Sheen, Christian Clemenson, Estelle Harris, Marla Gibbs, Rose Marie, Carole Cook, Michelle Clunie, Ever Carradine, Carl Michael Lindner, Jon Lovitz, Frankie Pace, Hal Sparks, Jason Stuart, Frankie Muniz, Agata Gotova	
A P R I L	23	Pushing Tin	20th Century Fox / Fox 2000 Pictures / Regency Enterprises	Mike Newell (director); Glen Charles (screenplay); John Cusack, Billy Bob Thornton, Cate Blanchett, Angelina Jolie, Jake Weber, Kurt Fuller, Vicki Lewis, Matt Ross, Jerry Grayson, Michael Willis, Philip Akin, Mike O'Malley, Neil Crone, Matt Gordon, Joe Pingue, Michael Hyatt, John Carroll Lynch, Kiersten Warren, Shaun Majumder, Catherine Lloyd Burns, Molly Price, Robyn Stevan, Ramona Milano, Jim Codrington, Martin Roach	
A P R I L	30	Entrapment	20th Century Fox / Regency Enterprises	Jon Amiel (director); Ronald Bass, William Broyles Jr. (screenplay); Sean Connery, Catherine Zeta-Jones, Ving Rhames, Will Patton, Maury Chaykin, Kevin McNally, Terry O'Neill, Madhav Sharma, David Yip, Tim Potter, Rolf Saxon	
A P R I L	30	Idle Hands	Columbia Pictures	Rodman Flender (director); Terri Hughes, Ron Milbauer (screenplay); Devon Sawa, Seth Green, Elden Henson, Jessica Alba, Vivica A. Fox, Jack Noseworthy, Christopher Hart, Robert Englund, Steve Van Wormer, Fred Willard, Connie Ray, Katie Wright, Kelly Monaco, Sean Whalen, Nick Sadler, Randy Oglesby, Timothy Stack, The Offspring, Dexter Holland, Mindy Sterling, Joey Slotnick, Tom DeLonge, Kyle Gass, Ricky Martin, Rodman Flender	
A P R I L	30	Three Seasons	October Films	Tony Bui (director/screenplay); Timothy Linh Bui (screenplay); Don Duong, Harvey Keitel, Nguyen Ngoc Hiep, Tran Manh Cuong, Zoe Bui, Nguyen Huu Duoc, Hoang Phat Trieu	
M A Y	7	The Mummy	Universal Pictures / Alphaville Films	Stephen Sommers (director/screenplay); Brendan Fraser, Rachel Weisz, John Hannah, Arnold Vosloo, Kevin J. O'Connor, Jonathan Hyde, Oded Fehr, Erick Avari, Omid Djalili, Bernard Fox, Patricia Velásquez, Stephen Dunham, Corey Johnson, Tuc Watkins, Aharon Ipale	
M A Y	7	The Third Man (re-release)	Rialto Pictures / British Lion Film Corporation / Selznick Releasing Organization / London Films	Carol Reed (director); Graham Greene (screenplay); Joseph Cotten, Alida Valli, Orson Welles, Trevor Howard, Paul Hörbiger, Ernst Deutsch, Erich Ponto, Siegfried Breuer, Hedwig Bleibtreu, Bernard Lee, Wilfrid Hyde-White, Annie Rosar, Robert Brown, Paul Hardtmuth, Geoffrey Keen, Eric Pohlmann, Reed De Rouen, Brother Theodore, Nelly Arno, Karel Štěpánek, Carol Reed, Alexis Chesnakov, Herbert Halbik	
M A Y	12	Trippin'	Rogue Pictures / Beacon Communications	David Raynr (director); Gary Hardwick (screenplay); Deon Richmond, Donald Faison, Guy Torry, Maia Campbell, Aloma Wright, Harold Sylvester	
M A Y	14	A Midsummer Night's Dream	Fox Searchlight Pictures / Regency Enterprises	Michael Hoffman (director/screenplay); Kevin Kline, Michelle Pfeiffer, Rupert Everett, Stanley Tucci, Calista Flockhart, Anna Friel, Christian Bale, Dominic West, David Strathairn, Sophie Marceau, Roger Rees, Max Wright, Gregory Jbara, Bill Irwin, Sam Rockwell, Bernard Hill, John Sessions	
M A Y	14	Tea with Mussolini	Metro-Goldwyn-Mayer	Franco Zeffirelli (director); John Mortimer (screenplay); Cher, Judi Dench, Joan Plowright, Maggie Smith, Lily Tomlin, Charlie Lucas, Baird Wallace, Massimo Ghini, Paolo Seganti, Michael Williams, Tessa Pritchard, Paul Chequer, Mino Bellei, Claudio Spadaro, Pino Colizzi	
M A Y	15	Rocky Marciano	MGM / Winkler Films	Charles Winkler (director/screenplay); William Nack, Larry Golin, Dick Beebe (screenplay); Jon Favreau, George C. Scott, Penelope Ann Miller, Judd Hirsch, Tony Lo Bianco, Duane Davis, Rino Romano, Rhoda Gemignani, Aron Tager, Noah Danby, Gil Filar, Lauren Collins, Dean Hagopian, Gavin Heffernan, John Kalbhenn, Marvin Kaye, Barry Kennedy, Bill Lake, Robert Latimer, John Liddle, Kenneth McGregor, Gerry Mendicino, Sandra Nelson, James O'Regan, Panou, Wayne Robson, Ed Sahely, Jerome Silvano, Carmela Albano, J. Winston Carroll, Jeff Clarke, Natasha Debellis, David Roemmele	
M A Y	19	Star Wars: Episode I – The Phantom Menace	20th Century Fox / Lucasfilm	George Lucas (director/screenplay); Liam Neeson, Ewan McGregor, Natalie Portman, Jake Lloyd, Ian McDiarmid, Pernilla August, Oliver Ford Davies, Hugh Quarshie, Ahmed Best, Anthony Daniels, Kenny Baker, Frank Oz, Terence Stamp, Brian Blessed, Andy Secombe, Ray Park, Lewis MacLeod, Warwick Davis, Steve Speirs, Silas Carson, Jerome St. John Blake, Alan Ruscoe, Ralph Brown, Celia Imrie, Benedict Taylor, Clarence Smith, Samuel L. Jackson, Dominic West, Cristina da Silva, Liz Wilson, Sofia Coppola, Keira Knightley, Bronagh Gallagher, Greg Proops, Scott Capurro, Mark Coulier, Lindsay Duncan, Peter Serafinowicz, James Taylor, Richard Armitage, Ben Burtt, Doug Chiang, Rob Coleman, Roman Coppola, Sean Cronin, Sally Hawkins, John Knoll, Rick McCallum, Lorne Peterson, Christopher Scarabosio, Christian Simpson, Scott Squires, Matthew Wood	
M A Y	21	The Love Letter	DreamWorks	Peter Chan (director); Maria Maggenti (screenplay); Kate Capshaw, Tom Everett Scott, Ellen DeGeneres, Tom Selleck, Blythe Danner, Julianne Nicholson, Gloria Stuart, Geraldine McEwan, Jack Black	
M A Y	22	A Lesson Before Dying	HBO NYC Productions	Joseph Sargent (director); Ann Peacock (screenplay); Don Cheadle, Cicely Tyson, Mekhi Phifer, Irma P. Hall, Brent Jennings, Lisa Arrindell Anderson, Dana Ivey, Frank Hoyt Taylor, Stuart Culpepper, Patty Mack, Von Coulter, Elijah Kelley, Wynton Yates, Jameelah Nuriddin, Cierra Meche, Sonny Shroyer, Clay Chappell, Michael Sahr Ngaujah, David Kote, Danny Nelson, Walter Breaux Jr., Carol Sutton	
M A Y	24	The Brave Little Toaster to the Rescue	Walt Disney Home Video	Robert C. Ramirez, Greg Sullivan, Pierre DeCelles (directors); Willard Carroll (screenplay); Deanna Oliver, Timothy Stack, Roger Kabler, Eric Lloyd, Thurl Ravenscroft, Brian Doyle-Murray, Chris Young, Jessica Tuck, Alfre Woodard, Jay Mohr, Danny Nucci, Andy Milder, Jonathan Benair, Eddie Bracken, Andrew Daly, Eddie Deezen, Paddi Edwards, Victoria Jackson, Kevin Meaney, Aretha Franklin, Frank Welker, Charlie Adler, Eric Bauza, Jeff Bennett, Jodi Benson, Mary Kay Bergman, Corey Burton, Dan Castellaneta, Cathy Cavadini, Cam Clarke, Paul Eiding, Jennifer Hale, Maurice LaMarche, Tress MacNeille, Gail Matthius, Anndi McAfee, Neil Ross, Roz Ryan, Susan Silo, Francesca Marie Smith, Jill Talley, B.J. Ward, Billy West, Susan Deming, Susie Stevens-Logan	
M A Y	28	The Loss of Sexual Innocence	Sony Pictures Classics / Summit Entertainment	Mike Figgis (director/screenplay); Julian Sands, Saffron Burrows, Stefano Dionisi, Kelly Macdonald, Jonathan Rhys Meyers, Gina McKee, Bernard Hill, Rossy de Palma, Justin Chadwick, Linda Evangelista, Femi Ogunbanjo, Hanne Klintoe	
M A Y	28	Notting Hill	Universal Pictures	Roger Michell (director); Richard Curtis (screenplay); Julia Roberts, Hugh Grant, Richard McCabe, Rhys Ifans, James Dreyfus, Dylan Moran, Hugh Bonneville, Emma Chambers, Tim McInnerny, Gina McKee, Henry Goodman, Julian Rhind-Tutt, Lorelei King, John Shrapnel, Clarke Peters, Arturo Venegas, Yolanda Vazquez, Mischa Barton, Emily Mortimer, Samuel West, Ann Beach, Alec Baldwin, Simon Callow, Joe Cornish, Matthew Modine	
M A Y	28	The Thirteenth Floor	Columbia Pictures / Centropolis Entertainment	Josef Rusnak (director/screenplay); Ravel Centeno-Rodriguez (screenplay); Craig Bierko, Gretchen Mol, Armin Mueller-Stahl, Vincent D'Onofrio, Dennis Haysbert, Shiri Appleby, Leon Rippy, Rif Hutton, Janet MacLachlan, Steven Schub, Alison Lohman	
M A Y	29	Inherit the Wind	Showtime Networks / MGM Television	Daniel Petrie (director); Nedrick Young, Harold Jacob Smith (screenplay); Jack Lemmon, George C. Scott, Beau Bridges, John Cullum, Brad Greenquist, Lane Smith, Tom Everett Scott, Kathryn Morris, Piper Laurie, Peter Mackenzie, Steve Monroe, Jim Meskimen, Royce D. Applegate, Amzie Strickland, Ronnie Claire Edwards, Dirk Blocker, John DeMita, Doug McGrath, Russ Tamblyn, David Wells, Dennis Cockrum	
J U N E	4	Buena Vista Social Club	Artisan Entertainment / FilmFour / Mars Distribution / Senator Film	Wim Wenders (director/screenplay); Francisco Repilado, Eliades Ochoa, Ry Cooder, Joachim Cooder, Ibrahim Ferrer, Omara Portuondo, Ruben Gonzalez, Orlando "Cachaíto" López, Amadito Valdes, Manuel "Guajiro" Mirabal, Barbarito Torres, Pio Leyva, Manuel "Puntillita" Licea, Juan de Marcos Gonzalez	
J U N E	4	Instinct	Touchstone Pictures / Spyglass Entertainment	Jon Turteltaub (director); Gerald Di Pego (screenplay); Anthony Hopkins, Cuba Gooding Jr., Donald Sutherland, Maura Tierney, George Dzundza, John Ashton, John Aylward	
J U N E	4	Limbo	Screen Gems	John Sayles (director/screenplay); Mary Elizabeth Mastrantonio, David Strathairn, Vanessa Martinez, Herminio Ramos, Kris Kristofferson, Dawn McInturff, Casey Siemaszko, Kathryn Grody, Tom Biss, Rita Taggart, Leo Burmester, Michael Laskin, Jimmy MacDonell, Merit Carlson-van Dort, Monica Brandner	
J U N E	11	Austin Powers: The Spy Who Shagged Me	New Line Cinema	Jay Roach (director); Mike Myers, Michael McCullers (screenplay); Mike Myers, Heather Graham, Michael York, Robert Wagner, Seth Green, Mindy Sterling, Rob Lowe, Verne Troyer, Elizabeth Hurley, Gia Carides, Oliver Muirhead, George Kee Cheung, Muse Watson, Scott Cooper, Clint Howard, Brian Hooks, David Koechner, Herb Mitchell, Steve Eastin, Jane Carr, Kevin Durand, Tim Bagley, Michael G. Hagerty, Jack Kehler, Jeff Garlin, Rachel Wilson, Jennifer Coolidge, Michael McDonald, Jeanette Miller, Carrie Ann Inaba, Bree Turner, Burt Bacharach, Elvis Costello, Will Ferrell, Woody Harrelson, Kristen Johnston, Charles Napier, Willie Nelson, Tim Robbins, Rebecca Romijn, Jerry Springer, Steve Wilkos, Fred Willard, Tony Jay, Douglas Fisher, Kevin Cooney, Frank Clem, Nicholas Walker, Eric Winzenreid, Colton James, Kirk Ward	
J U N E	11	The Red Violin	Lions Gate Films	Francois Girard (director/screenplay); Don McKellar (screenplay); Jason Flemyng, Greta Scacchi, Don McKellar, Sylvia Chang, Samuel L. Jackson, Colm Feore, Carlo Cecchi, Jean-Luc Bideau, Christoph Koncz, Clotilde Mollet, Joshua Bell, Tao Hong, Wang Xiaoshuai, Monique Mercure, Julian Richings, Sandra Oh, Rémy Girard, Irene Grazioli, Anita Laurenzi, Samuele Amighetti, Arthur Denberg, Eva Marie Bryer, Liu Zifeng, Han Xiaofei, Ireneusz Bogajewicz, Marvin Mill, Russell Yuen	
J U N E	18	The General's Daughter	Paramount Pictures	Simon West (director); Christopher Bertolini (screenplay); John Travolta, Madeleine Stowe, James Cromwell, Timothy Hutton, James Woods, Leslie Stefanson, Clarence Williams III, Daniel von Bargen, Mark Boone Junior, John Beasley, Boyd Kestner, Brad Beyer, John Benjamin Hickey, John Frankenheimer, Katrina vanden Heuvel, Scott Rosenberg, Cooper Huckabee	
J U N E	18	An Ideal Husband	Miramax Films	Oliver Parker (director/screenplay); Rupert Everett, Julianne Moore, Peter Vaughan, Minnie Driver, Cate Blanchett, Jeremy Northam, John Wood, Ben Pullen, Marsha Fitzalan, Lindsay Duncan, Neville Phillips, Nickolas Grace, Simon Russell Beale, Anna Patrick, Delia Lindsay	
J U N E	18	Run Lola Run	Sony Pictures Classics	Tom Tykwer (director/screenplay); Franka Potente, Moritz Bleibtreu, Herbert Knaup, Nina Petri, Joachim Król, Armin Rohde, Heino Ferch, Suzanne von Borsody, Sebastian Schipper, Ludger Pistor, Julia Lindig, Lars Rudolph, Ute Lubosch, Monica Bleibtreu, Hans Paetsch	
J U N E	18	Tarzan	Walt Disney Pictures	Chris Buck, Kevin Lima (directors); Tab Murphy, Bob Tzudiker, Noni White (screenplay); Tony Goldwyn, Minnie Driver, Brian Blessed, Glenn Close, Nigel Hawthorne, Lance Henriksen, Wayne Knight, Rosie O'Donnell, Alex D. Linz, Beth Anderson, Jack Angel, Joseph Ashton, Bob Bergen, Rodger Bumpass, Lily Collins, Kat Cressida, Jim Cummings, Aria Noelle Curzon, Jennifer Darling, Debi Derryberry, Patti Deutsch, Paul Eiding, Blake McIver Ewing, Sam Gifaldi, Micah Hauptman, Sherry Lynn, Danny Mann, Jason Marsden, Mickie T. McGowan, Phil Proctor, Ian Redford, Chris Sanders, Brianne Siddall, Shane Sweet, Erik von Detten, Joe Whyte, Danielle Wiener, Frank Welker, April Winchell, Phil Collins	
J U N E	25	Big Daddy	Columbia Pictures	Dennis Dugan (director); Steve Franks, Tim Herlihy, Adam Sandler (screenplay); Adam Sandler, Joey Lauren Adams, Jon Stewart, Rob Schneider, Dylan and Cole Sprouse, Leslie Mann, Jonathan Loughran, Allen Covert, Peter Dante, Kristy Swanson, Joseph Bologna, Steve Buscemi, Josh Mostel, Edmund Lyndeck, Geoffrey Horne, Jackie Sandler, Steven Brill, Carmen De Lavallade, Tim Herlihy, Larkin Malloy, Neal Huff, Greg Haberny, Dennis Dugan	
J U N E	25	My Son the Fanatic	Feature Film	Udayan Prasad (director); Hanif Kureishi (screenplay); Om Puri, Rachel Griffiths, Stellan Skarsgård	
J U N E	30	South Park: Bigger, Longer & Uncut	Paramount Pictures / Warner Bros. Pictures / Comedy Central Films	Trey Parker (director/screenplay); Matt Stone, Pam Brady (screenplay); Trey Parker, Matt Stone, Mary Kay Bergman, Isaac Hayes, Jesse Howell, Bruce Howell, Deb Adair, Jennifer Howell, George Clooney, Brent Spiner, Minnie Driver, Dave Foley, Eric Idle, Nick Rhodes, Toddy E. Walters, Stewart Copeland, Mike Judge, Howard McGillin	
J U N E	30	Wild Wild West	Warner Bros. Pictures / Peters Entertainment	Barry Sonnenfeld (director); S. S. Wilson, Brent Maddock, Jeffrey Price, Peter S. Seaman (screenplay); Will Smith, Kevin Kline, Kenneth Branagh, Salma Hayek, M. Emmet Walsh, Ted Levine, Frederique van der Wal, Musetta Vander, Bai Ling, Sofia Eng, Garcelle Beauvais-Nilon, Rodney A. Grant, Buck Taylor, Debra Christofferson, Orestes Matacena, Ian Abercrombie, Ismael 'East' Carlo, Derek Mears, Gary Carlos Cervantes, Michael Sims, Jerry Potter, Christian Aubert, E.J. Callahan, Scott Sandler	

== July–September ==
Opening		Title	Production company	Cast and crew	Ref.
J U L Y	2	Summer of Sam	Touchstone Pictures / 40 Acres and a Mule Filmworks	Spike Lee (director/screenplay); Victor Colicchio, Michael Imperioli (screenplay); John Leguizamo, Mira Sorvino, Adrien Brody, Jennifer Esposito, Michael Rispoli, Saverio Guerra, Brian Tarantina, Bebe Neuwirth, Patti LuPone, Mike Starr, Anthony LaPaglia, Roger Guenveur Smith, Ben Gazzara, Joe Lisi, Arthur Nascarella, John Savage, Jimmy Breslin, Michael Badalucco, Spike Lee, Michael Imperioli, John Turturro, Kim Director, Michael Sorvino	
J U L Y	3	Vendetta	HBO Pictures	Nicholas Meyer (director); Timothy Prager (screenplay); Christopher Walken, Luke Askew, Clancy Brown, Andrew Connolly, Bruce Davison, Joaquim de Almeida, Andrea Di Stefano, Edward Herrmann, Richard Libertini, Pierrino Mascarino, Daragh O'Malley, Kenneth Welsh, Gerry Mendicino, Frank Crudele, Stuart Stone, Nigel Shawn Williams, Conrad Dunn, Ron White, Wayne Robson, Joel Gordon, Amanda Brugel, Alessandro Colla, George N. Martin, Vincent Marino, Louis Di Bianco, Peter Didiano, Giuseppe Tancredi, Megan McChesney, Anna Mancini, Tony Mark, Ian Downie, Jack Newman, Jack Jessop, Delores Etienne, Joel Gordon, Victor Ertmanis, Richard Blackburn, Holly Dennison, Herbert Johnson, John Healy, James Bearden	
J U L Y	9	American Pie	Universal Pictures	Paul Weitz (director); Adam Herz (screenplay); Jason Biggs, Chris Klein, Natasha Lyonne, Thomas Ian Nicholas, Tara Reid, Mena Suvari, Alyson Hannigan, Seann William Scott, Eddie Kaye Thomas, Shannon Elizabeth, Eugene Levy, Jennifer Coolidge, Chris Owen, John Cho, Justin Isfeld, Molly Cheek, Clyde Kusatsu, Lawrence Pressman, Christina Milian, Eden Riegel, Veronica Lauren, Sasha Barrese, Eric Lively, Eli Marienthal, Blink-182, Casey Affleck, Tara Subkoff	
J U L Y	9	Arlington Road	Screen Gems / Lakeshore Entertainment	Mark Pellington (director); Ehren Kruger (screenplay); Jeff Bridges, Tim Robbins, Joan Cusack, Hope Davis, Robert Gossett, Spencer Treat Clark, Mason Gamble, Stanley Anderson, Laura Poe	
J U L Y	9	Genghis Blues	Roxie Releasing	Roko Belic (director); Paul Pena	
J U L Y	14	The Blair Witch Project	Artisan Entertainment	Eduardo Sánchez, Daniel Myrick (director/screenplay); Heather Donahue, Michael C. Williams, Joshua Leonard	
J U L Y	14	Muppets from Space	Columbia Pictures / Jim Henson Pictures	Tim Hill (director); Jerry Juhl, Joey Mazzarino, Ken Kaufman (screenplay); Dave Goelz, Steve Whitmire, Bill Barretta, Jerry Nelson, Brian Henson, Kevin Clash, Frank Oz, Adam Hunt, Jeffrey Tambor, F. Murray Abraham, Rob Schneider, Josh Charles, Ray Liotta, David Arquette, Andie MacDowell, Kathy Griffin, Pat Hingle, Hollywood Hogan, Alice Dinnean, John Henson, John Kennedy, Peter Linz, Drew Massey, Tyler Bunch, Bruce Lanoil, Allan Trautman, Katie Holmes, Joshua Jackson, Gary Owens	
J U L Y	16	Eyes Wide Shut	Warner Bros. Pictures	Stanley Kubrick (director/screenplay); Frederic Raphael (screenplay); Tom Cruise, Nicole Kidman, Sydney Pollack, Todd Field, Marie Richardson, Sky du Mont, Rade Serbedzija, Vinessa Shaw, Fay Masterson, Alan Cumming, Leelee Sobieski, Leon Vitali, Julienne Davis, Abigail Good, Jackie Sawiris, Leslie Lowe, Peter Benson, Michael Doven, Togo Igawa, Sam Douglas, Angus MacInnes, Brian W. Cook, Cindy Dolenc, Treva Etienne, Cate Blanchett, Christiane Kubrick, Katharina Kubrick	
J U L Y	16	Lake Placid	20th Century Fox / Fox 2000 Pictures / Phoenix Pictures	Steve Miner (director); David E. Kelley (screenplay); Bill Pullman, Bridget Fonda, Oliver Platt, Brendan Gleeson, Betty White, Meredith Salenger, David Lewis, Tim Dixon, Natassia Malthe, Mariska Hargitay, Jed Rees, Richard Leacock, Jake T. Roberts, Ty Olsson, Adam Arkin	
J U L Y	16	The Wood	Paramount Pictures / MTV Productions	Rick Famuyiwa (director/screenplay); Todd Boyd (screenplay); Omar Epps, Richard T. Jones, Taye Diggs, Sanaa Lathan, LisaRaye McCoy, De'Aundre Bonds, Antwon Tanner, Aubrey Allen, Sean Nelson, Duane Finley, Trent Cameron, Malinda Williams, Tamala Jones, Jascha Washington	
J U L Y	23	Drop Dead Gorgeous	New Line Cinema	Michael Patrick Jann (director); Lona Williams (screenplay); Kirstie Alley, Ellen Barkin, Kirsten Dunst, Denise Richards, Allison Janney, Sam McMurray, Mindy Sterling, Brittany Murphy, Amy Adams, Will Sasso, Alexandra Holden, Matt Malloy, Mike McShane, Lona Williams, Nora Dunn, Mo Gaffney, Adam West, Patti Yasutake, Seiko Matsuda, Amanda Detmer, Thomas Lennon, Samantha Harris, Mary Gillis, Richard Narita, Laurie Sinclair, Shannon Nelson, Tara Redepenning, Sarah Stewart, Brooke Elise Bushman, John T. Olsen	
J U L Y	23	The Haunting	DreamWorks	Jan de Bont (director); David Self, Michael Tolkin (screenplay); Liam Neeson, Catherine Zeta-Jones, Owen Wilson, Lili Taylor, Bruce Dern, Marian Seldes, Todd Field, Virginia Madsen, Michael Cavanaugh, Tom Irwin, M. C. Gainey, Debi Derryberry, Sherry Lynn, Courtland Mead, Travis Tedford, Alix Koromzay, Charles Gunning, Hadley Eure, Saul Priever, Kadina Halliday, Jessica Evans, Miles Marsico, Kelsey Mulrooney, Kyle McDougle, Hannah Swanson	
J U L Y	23	Inspector Gadget	Walt Disney Pictures / Caravan Pictures / DIC Entertainment	David Kellogg (director); Kerry Ehrin, Zak Penn (screenplay); Matthew Broderick, Rupert Everett, Joely Fisher, Michelle Trachtenberg, Andy Dick, Dabney Coleman, D. L. Hughley, René Auberjonois, Don Adams, Cheri Oteri, Michael G. Hagerty, Frances Bay, J. P. Manoux, Brian George, Sonya Eddy, Andy Heyward, Aaron Meyerson, Mr. T, Richard Kiel, Richard Lee-Sung, Bobby Bell, Hank Barrera, Keith Morrison	
J U L Y	23	My Life So Far	Miramax Films	Hugh Hudson (director); Simon Donald (screenplay); Colin Firth, Rosemary Harris, Irène Jacob, Mary Elizabeth Mastrantonio, Malcolm McDowell, Robert Norman, Tchéky Karyo, Kelly Macdonald, Sean Scanlan, Anne Lacey, Moray Hunter, Jimmy Logan, Brendan Gleeson, Eileen McCallum, Carmen Pieraccini, Elaine Ellis, Julie Wilson Nimmo, Freddie Jones, Ralph Riach, Jenni Keenan Green, Clive Russell, Jamie MacTavish, Douglas Forrest	
J U L Y	23	Trick	Fine Line Features	Jim Fall (director); Jason Schafer (screenplay); Christian Campbell, John Paul Pitoc, Tori Spelling, Lorri Bagley, Brad Beyer, Steve Hayes, Clinton Leupp, Kevin Chamberlin, Missi Pyle, Lacey Kohl	
J U L Y	28	Deep Blue Sea	Warner Bros. Pictures / Village Roadshow Pictures	Renny Harlin (director); Duncan Kennedy, Donna Powers, Wayne Powers (screenplay); Thomas Jane, Michael Rapaport, Stellan Skarsgård, LL Cool J, Samuel L. Jackson, Saffron Burrows, Jacqueline McKenzie, Aida Turturro	
J U L Y	30	Runaway Bride	Paramount Pictures / Touchstone Pictures / Lakeshore Entertainment	Garry Marshall (director); Josann McGibbon, Audrey Wells (screenplay); Julia Roberts, Richard Gere, Joan Cusack, Héctor Elizondo, Rita Wilson, Paul Dooley, Christopher Meloni, Sela Ward, Laurie Metcalf, Larry Miller, Donal Logue, Reg Rogers, Yul Vazquez, Jane Morris, Kathleen Marshall, Tom Mason, Shannon Wilcox, Diana Kent, Linda Larkin, Garry Marshall, Scott Marshall, Simon Shelton, Lisa Roberts Gillan, Jean Schertler, Emily Eby	
J U L Y	30	Twin Falls Idaho	Sony Pictures Classics	Michael Polish (director/screenplay); Mark Polish (screenplay); Mark Polish, Michael Polish, Michele Hicks, Jon Gries, Patrick Bauchau, Garrett Morris, William Katt, Lesley Ann Warren	
A U G U S T	4	Dick	Columbia Pictures / Phoenix Pictures	Andrew Fleming (director); Andrew Fleming, Sheryl Longin (screenplay); Kirsten Dunst, Michelle Williams, Dan Hedaya, Bruce McCulloch, Will Ferrell, Saul Rubinek, Teri Garr, Dave Foley, Harry Shearer, Ted McGinley, Karl Pruner, Devon Gummersall, Jim Breuer, G. D. Spradlin, Ryan Reynolds, French Stewart	
A U G U S T	6	The Adventures of Sebastian Cole	Paramount Classics	Tod Williams (director/screenplay); Adrian Grenier, Clark Gregg, Margaret Colin, Gabriel Macht, Aleksa Palladino, John Shea, Marni Lustig, Joan Copeland, Tom Lacy, Russel Harper, Rory Cochrane, Famke Janssen, Nicole Ari Parker, Marisol Padilla Sanchez, Levon Helm	
A U G U S T	6	Illuminata	Artisan Entertainment	John Turturro (director/screenplay); Brandon Cole (screenplay); John Turturro, Katherine Borowitz, Beverly D'Angelo, Ben Gazzara, Donal McCann, Susan Sarandon, Rufus Sewell, Christopher Walken, Georgina Cates, Bill Irwin, Aida Turturro, Rocco Sisto, Matthew Sussman	
A U G U S T	6	The Iron Giant	Warner Bros. Pictures	Brad Bird (director/screenplay); Tim McCanlies (screenplay); Vin Diesel, Eli Marienthal, Jennifer Aniston, Harry Connick Jr., James Gammon, Cloris Leachman, John Mahoney, Christopher McDonald, M. Emmet Walsh, Jack Angel, Bill Farmer, Bob Bergen, Charles Howerton, Mary Kay Bergman, Ollie Johnston, Sherry Lynn, Rodger Bumpass, Ryan O'Donohue, Robert Clotworthy, Phil Proctor, Jennifer Darling, Frank Thomas, Paul Eiding, Brian Tochi, Jack Paar, Michael Bird, Devon Borisoff, Mickie T. McGowan, Zack Eginton, Patti Tippo	
A U G U S T	6	Mystery Men	Universal Pictures	Kinka Usher (director); Bob Burden, Neil Cuthbert (screenplay); Hank Azaria, Janeane Garofalo, William H. Macy, Kel Mitchell, Paul Reubens, Ben Stiller, Wes Studi, Greg Kinnear, Geoffrey Rush, Lena Olin, Eddie Izzard, Artie Lange, Prakazrel "Pras" Michel, Claire Forlani, Tom Waits, Louise Lasser, Ricky Jay, Jenifer Lewis, Ernie Lee Banks, Gerry Becker, Ned Bellamy, Corbin Bleu, Philip Bolden, Jake Cross, Emmy Laybourne, Monet Mazur, Joel McCrary, Kinka Usher, Angelica Bridges, Michael Bay, Riki Rachtman, Goodie Mob, Sung Kang, Shane Johnson, Marie Matiko, Jody Watley, Billy Beck, Mark Mothersbaugh, Stacey Travis, Oliver Clark, Jack Plotnick, Dane Cook, Doug Jones, Dana Gould	
A U G U S T	6	The Sixth Sense	Hollywood Pictures / Spyglass Entertainment / The Kennedy/Marshall Company	M. Night Shyamalan (director/screenplay); Bruce Willis, Haley Joel Osment, Toni Collette, Olivia Williams, Donnie Wahlberg, Glenn Fitzgerald, Mischa Barton, Trevor Morgan, Bruce Norris, Angelica Page, Greg Wood, M. Night Shyamalan	
A U G U S T	6	The Thomas Crown Affair	Metro-Goldwyn-Mayer / Irish DreamTime	John McTiernan (director); Leslie Dixon, Kurt Wimmer (screenplay); Pierce Brosnan, Rene Russo, Denis Leary, Fritz Weaver, Frankie Faison, Ben Gazzara, Mark Margolis, Esther Canadas, Faye Dunaway, Michael Lombard, Cynthia Darlow	
A U G U S T	13	Bowfinger	Universal Pictures / Imagine Entertainment	Frank Oz (director); Steve Martin (screenplay); Steve Martin, Eddie Murphy, Heather Graham, Christine Baranski, Terence Stamp, Robert Downey Jr., Jamie Kennedy, Adam Alexi-Malle, Kohl Sudduth, Barry Newman, Alejandro Patino, Johnny Sanchez, John Cho, Phill Lewis, Marisol Nichols, Kevin Grevioux	
A U G U S T	13	Brokedown Palace	20th Century Fox / Fox 2000 Pictures	Jonathan Kaplan (director); David Arata (screenplay); Claire Danes, Kate Beckinsale, Bill Pullman, Lim Kay Tong, Lou Diamond Phillips, Jacqueline Kim, Daniel Lapaine, John Doe, Tom Amandes, Aimee Graham, Lori Lethin, Paul Walker, Victor Neri	
A U G U S T	13	Detroit Rock City	New Line Cinema	Adam Rifkin (director); Carl V. Dupre (screenplay); Edward Furlong, Sam Huntington, Giuseppe Andrews, James DeBello, Lin Shaye, Melanie Lynskey, Natasha Lyonne, Emmanuelle Chriqui, Shannon Tweed, Nick Scotti, David Quane, Joe Flaherty, Michael Barry, Matthew G. Taylor, Robert Smith, Ron Jeremy, Kiss	
A U G U S T	20	Mickey Blue Eyes	Warner Bros. Pictures / Castle Rock Entertainment	Kelly Makin (director); Adam Scheinman, Robert Kuhn (screenplay); Hugh Grant, James Caan, Jeanne Tripplehorn, Burt Young, James Fox, Joe Viterelli, Gerry Becker, Maddie Corman, Tony Darrow, Paul Lazar, Vincent Pastore, Frank Pellegrino, Scott Thompson, John Ventimiglia, Margaret Devine, Beatrice Winde	
A U G U S T	20	Teaching Mrs. Tingle	Dimension Films	Kevin Williamson (director/screenplay); Katie Holmes, Helen Mirren, Barry Watson, Marisa Coughlan, Jeffrey Tambor, Liz Stauber, Molly Ringwald, Vivica A. Fox, Michael McKean, Lesley Ann Warren, John Patrick White, Robert Gant, Marissa Jaret Winokur	
A U G U S T	20	Universal Soldier: The Return	TriStar Pictures	Mic Rodgers (director); William Malone, John Fasano (screenplay); Jean-Claude Van Damme, Michael Jai White, Heidi Schanz, Xander Berkeley, Justin Lazard, Kiana Tom, Daniel von Bargen, James R. Black, Bill Goldberg	
A U G U S T	21	Introducing Dorothy Dandridge	HBO Pictures	Martha Coolidge (director); Shonda Rhimes, Scott Abbott (screenplay); Halle Berry, Brent Spiner, Klaus Maria Brandauer, Obba Babatundé, Loretta Devine, Cynda Williams, LaTanya Richardson, Tamara Taylor, William Atherton, D. B. Sweeney, Sharon Brown, Joanne Baron, Margaret Easley, Clinton Derricks-Carroll, Kerri Randles, Ken Michelman, Tom Virtue, Larry Poindexter, Guy Torry, Raphael Sbarge, Benjamin Brown, Clement von Franckenstein, Jon Lindstrom, Wendi Williams, Darrian C. Ford, André Carthen, Jon Mack	
A U G U S T	25	In Too Deep	Dimension Films	Michael Rymer (director); Michael Henry Brown, Paul Aaron (screenplay); Omar Epps, LL Cool J, Nia Long, Stanley Tucci, Hill Harper, Pam Grier, Jake Weber, Richard Brooks, David Patrick Kelly, Veronica Webb, Ron Canada, Robert LaSardo, Gano Grills, Ivonne Coll, Don Harvey, Jermaine Dupri, Lloyd Adams, Philip Akin, Anna Carolina Alvim, Karina Arroyave, Chris Collins, Guillermo Diaz, Aunjanue Ellis, Sticky Fingaz, Avery Waddell, Michie Mee, Mýa, Shyheim, Nas, Hassan Johnson	
A U G U S T	27	The 13th Warrior	Touchstone Pictures	John McTiernan (director/screenplay); William Wisher Jr., Warren Lewis (screenplay); Antonio Banderas, Diane Venora, Dennis Storhøi, Vladimir Kulich, Omar Sharif, Richard Bremmer, Tony Curran, Mischa Hausserman, Asbjorn Riis, Clive Russell, Daniel Southern, Sven Wollter, John DeSantis, Erick Avari, Maria Bonnevie, Susan Willis, Anders T. Andersen, Neil Maffin, Oliver Sveinall, Albie Woodington	
A U G U S T	27	The Astronaut's Wife	New Line Cinema	Rand Ravich (director/screenplay); Johnny Depp, Charlize Theron, Joe Morton, Clea DuVall, Donna Murphy, Nick Cassavetes, Samantha Eggar, Gary Grubbs, Blair Brown, Tom Noonan, Tom O'Brien, Lucy Lin, Michael Crider, Edward Kerr, Cole and Dylan Sprouse, Rondi Reed	
A U G U S T	27	A Dog of Flanders	Warner Bros. Pictures	Kevin Brodie (director/screenplay); Robert Singer (screenplay); Jack Warden, Jeremy James Kissner, Jesse James, Jon Voight, Cheryl Ladd, Steven Hartley, Bruce McGill, Andrew Bicknell, Farren Monet Daniels, Madylin Sweeten, Fred Van Kuyk, Frederick Oxby, Julien Bosman, Bouli Lanners, Anne Grandhenry	
A U G U S T	27	Dudley Do-Right	Universal Pictures	Hugh Wilson (director/screenplay); Brendan Fraser, Sarah Jessica Parker, Alfred Molina, Eric Idle, Robert Prosky, Alex Rocco, Jack Kehler, Jed Rees, C. Ernst Harth, Regis Philbin, Kathie Lee Gifford, Michael 'Boogaloo Shrimp' Chambers, Anne Fletcher, Louis Mustillo, Ernie Grunwald, Michal Suchánek, Brent Butt, Corey Burton, Don Yesso, Jessica Schreier, Kevin Mundy, Dyllan Christopher, Ashley Yarman, Jeremy Bergman	
A U G U S T	27	The Muse	October Films	Albert Brooks (director/screenplay); Monica Johnson (screenplay); Albert Brooks, Sharon Stone, Andie MacDowell, Jeff Bridges, Steven Wright, Mark Feuerstein, Bradley Whitford, Jennifer Tilly, Rob Reiner, Wolfgang Puck, James Cameron, Martin Scorsese, Lorenzo Lamas, Skip O'Brien, Bobby Edner, Stacey Travis, Steve Valentine, Greg Grunberg, Steven Anthony Lawrence, Dakin Matthews, Concetta Tomei	
A U G U S T	27	The Very Thought of You	Miramax Films	Nick Hamm (director); Peter Morgan (screenplay); Monica Potter, Rufus Sewell, Tom Hollander, Joseph Fiennes, Ray Winstone	
S E P T E M B E R	1	Chill Factor	Warner Bros. Pictures / Morgan Creek Productions	Hugh Johnson (director); Drew Gitlin, Mike Cheda (screenplay); Cuba Gooding Jr., Skeet Ulrich, Peter Firth, David Paymer, Hudson Leick, Daniel Hugh Kelly, Kevin J. O'Connor, Rhoda Griffis, Jordan Mott, Judson Mills, Geoff Palmer, Ray McCort	
S E P T E M B E R	1	Outside Providence	Miramax Films	Michael Corrente (director/screenplay); Peter Farrelly, Bobby Farrelly (screenplay); Shawn Hatosy, Amy Smart, Alec Baldwin, Jon Abrahams, Jonathan Brandis, Tommy Bone, Adam LaVorgna, Jesse Leach, Gabriel Mann, Kristen Shorten, Jack Ferver, Richard Jenkins, Mike Cerrone, George Wendt, Eric Brown, Alex Toma, Timothy Crowe	
S E P T E M B E R	10	Best Laid Plans	Fox Searchlight Pictures	Mike Barker (director); Ted Griffin (screenplay); Josh Brolin, Alessandro Nivola, Reese Witherspoon, Terrence Howard, Jamie Marsh. Rocky Carroll, Gene Wolande, Owen Bush, Michael G. Hagerty, David Mandel, Alec Berg, Jeff Schaffer, Sean Nepita, José Mendoza	
S E P T E M B E R	10	Love Stinks	Baumgarten-Prophet Entertainment	Jeff Franklin (director/screenplay); French Stewart, Bridgette Wilson, Bill Bellamy, Tyra Banks, Steve Hytner, Jason Bateman, Tiffani Thiessen, Montrose Hagins, Ivana Miličević, Renata Scott, Warren Littlefield, Shanna Moakler, Julia Schultz, Shae Marks, Colleen Camp, John O'Hurley, Luis Ávalos, Dale Raoul, Kevin Farley, Ellis E. Williams, Jeff Franklin, Tom Gammill, Dyllan Christopher, Erika Eleniak	
S E P T E M B E R	10	Stigmata	Metro-Goldwyn-Mayer / FGM Entertainment	Rupert Wainwright (director); Tom Lazarus, Rick Ramage (screenplay); Patricia Arquette, Gabriel Byrne, Jonathan Pryce, Nia Long, Rade Šerbedžija, Shaun Toub, Enrico Colantoni, Jack Donner, Thomas Kopache, Dick Latessa, Portia de Rossi, Patrick Muldoon, Ann Cusack, Mariah Nunn, Mary Linda Phillips	
S E P T E M B E R	10	Stir of Echoes	Artisan Entertainment	David Koepp (director/screenplay); Kevin Bacon, Kathryn Erbe, Illeana Douglas, Jennifer Morrison, Zachary David Cope, Liza Weil, Kevin Dunn, Lusia Strus, Chalon Williams, Conor O'Farrell, Steve Rifkin, Eddie Bo Smith, Jr.	
S E P T E M B E R	17	Blue Streak	Columbia Pictures	Les Mayfield (director); Michael Berry, John Blumenthal, Stephen Carpenter (screenplay); Martin Lawrence, Luke Wilson, Dave Chappelle, Peter Greene, Olek Krupa, Nicole Ari Parker, William Forsythe, Graham Beckel, Robert Miranda, Saverio Guerra, Richard C. Sarafian, Tamala Jones, Julio Oscar Mechoso, Steve Rankin, Carmen Argenziano, John Hawkes	
S E P T E M B E R	17	Breakfast of Champions	Hollywood Pictures / Summit Entertainment	Alan Rudolph (director/screenplay); Bruce Willis, Albert Finney, Nick Nolte, Barbara Hershey, Glenne Headly, Lukas Haas, Omar Epps, Vicki Lewis, Buck Henry, Ken Hudson Campbell, Valerie Perrine, Jake Johannsen, Will Patton, Chip Zien, Owen Wilson, Alison Eastwood, Shawnee Smith, Michael Jai White, Michael Clarke Duncan, Kurt Vonnegut, Doug Maughan	
S E P T E M B E R	17	For Love of the Game	Universal Pictures / Beacon Pictures / Tig Productions	Sam Raimi (director); Dana Stevens (screenplay); Kevin Costner, Kelly Preston, John C. Reilly, Jena Malone, Brian Cox, J. K. Simmons, Michael Papajohn, William Newman, Bill E. Rogers, Bob Sheppard, Daniel Dae Kim, Greer Barnes, Larry Joshua, Vin Scully, Steve Lyons, Mike Buddie, Augie Garrido	
S E P T E M B E R	17	Sugar Town	October Films / USA Films	Allison Anders, Kurt Voss (directors/screenplay); Rosanna Arquette, Beverly D'Angelo, Michael Des Barres, John Doe, Jade Gordon, Martin Kemp, Larry Klein, Ally Sheedy, John Taylor, Lucinda Jenney, Lumi Cavazos, Polly Platt, Chris Mulkey, Bijou Phillips, Michael E. Rodgers, Veronica Nommenson, Elena Nommenson, Amelia Nommenson, Richmond Arquette, Paige Dylan, Vincent Nerve, Antonia Bogdanovich, Kai Lennox, Kadu Lennox, Ursula Brooks	
S E P T E M B E R	24	Double Jeopardy	Paramount Pictures	Bruce Beresford (director); David Weisberg, Douglas Cook (screenplay); Tommy Lee Jones, Ashley Judd, Bruce Greenwood, Annabeth Gish, Roma Maffia, Jay Brazeau, Michael Gaston, Bruce Campbell, Daniel Lapaine, Spencer Treat Clark, Betsy Brantley, Babz Chula, Dave Hager, Benjamin Weir, Davenia McFadden	
S E P T E M B E R	24	Guinevere	Miramax Films / Millennium Films	Audrey Wells (director/screenplay); Stephen Rea, Sarah Polley, Jean Smart, Gina Gershon, Paul Dooley, Carrie Preston, Tracy Letts, Emily Procter, Sharon McNight, Gedde Watanabe, Carlton Wilborn, Sandra Oh, Jasmine Guy, Francis Guinan, Lynne Marie Stewart, Kai Ephron, Alexandra Holden, J. Trevor Edmond	
S E P T E M B E R	24	Jakob the Liar	Columbia Pictures / Blue Wolf Productions	Peter Kassovitz (director/screenplay), Didier Decoin (Screenplay); Robin Williams, Alan Arkin, Liev Schreiber, Hannah Taylor-Gordon, Bob Balaban, Armin Mueller-Stahl, Mark Margolis, Michael Jeter	
S E P T E M B E R	24	The Minus Man	Artisan Entertainment	Hampton Fancher (director/screenplay); Owen Wilson, Janeane Garofalo, Brian Cox, Mercedes Ruehl, Dwight Yoakam, Dennis Haysbert, Sheryl Crow, Meg Foster, John Vargas, Eric Mabius, Larry Miller, Daniel "Big Black" Rey, Brent Briscoe, David Warshofsky, Mark Derwin, Matt Gerald, John Carroll Lynch	
S E P T E M B E R	24	Mumford	Touchstone Pictures	Lawrence Kasdan (director/screenplay); Loren Dean, Hope Davis, Jason Lee, Alfre Woodard, Mary McDonnell, Martin Short, David Paymer, Pruitt Taylor Vince, Jane Adams, Zooey Deschanel, Ted Danson, Kevin Tighe, Dana Ivey, Jason Ritter, Elisabeth Moss, Robert Stack, Simon Helberg, Kelly Monaco, Kirk Fox, Hélène Cardona, Priscilla Barnes, Eddie McClintock, Lucie Laurier, Charles Okun, Holt McCallany	
S E P T E M B E R	28	Alvin and the Chipmunks Meet Frankenstein	Universal Studios Home Video / Universal Cartoon Studios / Bagdasarian Productions, LLC. / Tama Productions	Kathi Castillo (director); John Loy (screenplay); Ross Bagdasarian Jr., Janice Karman, Michael Bell, Jim Meskimen, Frank Welker, Dee Bradley Baker, Mary Kay Bergman, Kevin Michael Richardson, Susan Boyd	

== October–December ==
Opening		Title	Production company	Cast and crew	Ref.
O C T O B E R	1	The Adventures of Elmo in Grouchland	Columbia Pictures / Jim Henson Pictures / Children's Television Workshop	Gary Halvorson (director); Mitchell Kriegman, Joey Mazzarino (screenplay); Kevin Clash, Mandy Patinkin, Vanessa L. Williams, Caroll Spinney, Fran Brill, Jerry Nelson, Frank Oz, Steve Whitmire, Stephanie D'Abruzzo, Dave Goelz, Joseph Mazzarino, Carmen Osbahr, Martin P. Robinson, David Rudman, Bruce Lanoil, Bill Barretta, Leslie Carrera, Kirk Thatcher, Matt Vogel, Sonia Manzano, Roscoe Orman, Alison Bartlett-O'Reilly, Ruth Buzzi, Emilio Delgado, Loretta Long, Bob McGrath	
O C T O B E R	1	American Beauty	DreamWorks	Sam Mendes (director); Alan Ball (screenplay); Kevin Spacey, Annette Bening, Thora Birch, Wes Bentley, Mena Suvari, Chris Cooper, Allison Janney, Peter Gallagher, Scott Bakula, Sam Robards, Barry Del Sherman, Ara Celi, John Cho, Sue Casey, Kent Faulcon, Amber Smith, Marissa Jaret Winokur	
O C T O B E R	1	Drive Me Crazy	20th Century Fox	John Schultz (director); Rob Thomas (screenplay); Melissa Joan Hart, Adrian Grenier, Stephen Collins, Susan May Pratt, Mark Webber, Kris Park, Gabriel Carpenter, Ali Larter, Lourdes Benedicto, Keri Lynn Pratt, Natasha Pearce, Jordan Bridges, Keram Malicki-Sanchez, Mark Metcalf, William Converse-Roberts, Faye Grant	
O C T O B E R	1	Mystery, Alaska	Hollywood Pictures	Jay Roach (director); David E. Kelley, Sean O'Byrne (screenplay); Russell Crowe, Burt Reynolds, Colm Meaney, Mary McCormack, Hank Azaria, Lolita Davidovich, Ron Eldard, Maury Chaykin, Josh Silberg, Michael Buie, Ryan Northcott, Beth Littleford, Kevin Durand, Scott Grimes, Jason Gray-Stanford, Adam Beach, Leroy Peltier, Cameron Bancroft, Michael McKean, Rachel Wilson, Megyn Price, Judith Ivey, Terry David Mulligan, Mike Myers, Jim Fox, Phil Esposito, Little Richard, L. Scott Caldwell, Steve Levy, Barry Melrose	
O C T O B E R	1	Three Kings	Warner Bros. Pictures / Village Roadshow Pictures	David O. Russell (director/screenplay); George Clooney, Mark Wahlberg, Ice Cube, Spike Jonze, Cliff Curtis, Nora Dunn, Jamie Kennedy, Said Taghmaoui, Mykelti Williamson, Holt McCallany, Judy Greer, Alia Shawkat, Liz Stauber	
O C T O B E R	5	Scooby-Doo! and the Witch's Ghost	Warner Home Video	Jim Stenstrum (director); Rick Copp, David A. Goodman, Glenn Leopold, Davis Doi (screenplay); Scott Innes, Mary Kay Bergman, Frank Welker, B.J. Ward, Tim Curry, Kimberly Brooks, Jennifer Hale, Jane Wiedlin, Bob Joles, Peter Renaday, Tress MacNeille, Neil Ross, Jamie Alcroft, Rodger Bumpass, Mike Pollock, Dee Bradley Baker, Bill Fagerbakke, Buster Jones, Debi Derryberry, Jill Talley	
O C T O B E R	8	The Limey	Artisan Entertainment	Steven Soderbergh (director); Lem Dobbs (screenplay); Terence Stamp, Lesley Ann Warren, Luis Guzmán, Barry Newman, Peter Fonda, Joe Dallesandro, Nicky Katt, Amelia Heinle, Melissa George, William Lucking, Nancy Lenehan, Bill Duke, Allan Graf, Steve Heinze, Michaela Gallo, Matthew Kimbrough, John Robotham, Wayne Pére, John Cothran, Ousaun Elam, Dwayne McGee, Brian Bennet	
O C T O B E R	8	Random Hearts	Columbia Pictures / Mirage Enterprises / Rastar Productions	Sydney Pollack (director); Kurt Luedtke (screenplay); Harrison Ford, Kristin Scott Thomas, Charles S. Dutton, Sydney Pollack, Bonnie Hunt, Dennis Haysbert, Richard Jenkins, Paul Guilfoyle, Susanna Thompson, Peter Coyote, Kate Mara, Susan Floyd, Dylan Baker, Lynne Thigpen, Reiko Aylesworth, Edie Falco	
O C T O B E R	8	Superstar	Paramount Pictures / SNL Studios	Bruce McCulloch (director); Steve Koren (screenplay); Molly Shannon, Will Ferrell, Harland Williams, Elaine Hendrix, Mark McKinney, Tom Green, Glynis Johns, Jason Blicker, Gerry Bamman, Emmy Laybourne, Jennifer Irwin, Rob Stefaniuk, Natalie Radford, Karyn Dwyer, Chuck Campbell	
O C T O B E R	15	Fight Club	20th Century Fox / Fox 2000 Pictures / Regency Enterprises	David Fincher (director); Jim Uhls (screenplay); Brad Pitt, Edward Norton, Helena Bonham Carter, Meat Loaf, Jared Leto, Zach Grenier, Thom Gossom Jr., Bob Stephenson, Peter Iacangelo, David Andrews, Tim de Zarn, Ezra Buzzington, David Lee Smith, Holt McCallany, Eion Bailey, Paul Carafotes, Mark Fite, Michael Shamus Wiles, Stuart Blumberg, Matt Winston, Leonard Termo, Markus Redmond, Richmond Arquette, Joon B. Kim, Van Quattro, Michael Girardin	
O C T O B E R	15	The Omega Code	Gener8Xion Entertainment	Robert Marcarelli (director); Stephan Blinn, Hollis Barton (screenplay); Casper Van Dien, Michael York, Catherine Oxenberg, Michael Ironside, Devon Odessa	
O C T O B E R	15	The Story of Us	Universal Pictures / Castle Rock Entertainment	Rob Reiner (director); Alan Zweibel, Jessie Nelson (screenplay); Bruce Willis, Michelle Pfeiffer, Rita Wilson, Rob Reiner, Julie Hagerty, Tim Matheson, Lucy Webb, Bill Kirchenbauer, Red Buttons, Jayne Meadows, Tom Poston, Betty White, Ken Lerner, Victor Raider-Wexler, Albert Hague, Alan Zweibel, Jessie Nelson, Michael Chapman, Jordan Lund, Art Evans, Paul Reiser	
O C T O B E R	15	The Straight Story	Walt Disney Pictures	David Lynch (director); John Roach, Mary Sweeney (screenplay); Richard Farnsworth, Sissy Spacek, Harry Dean Stanton, Wiley Harker, Kevin Farley, John P. Farley, Everett McGill, Dan Flannery, Jane Galloway Heitz, Joseph Carpenter, Donald Wiegert, Ed Grennan, Jack Walsh, James Cada, Anastasia Webb, Barbara Robertson, John Lordan, Max the Wonder Dog	
O C T O B E R	16	Excellent Cadavers	HBO Pictures	Ricky Tognazzi (director); Peter Pruce (screenplay); Chazz Palminteri, F. Murray Abraham, Anna Galiena, Andy Luotto, Lina Sastri, Arnoldo Foà, Ivo Garrani, Gianmarco Tognazzi, Pierfrancesco Favino, Mattia Sbragia, Francesco Benigno, Mario Erpichini, Victor Cavallo, Giuseppe Cederna, Stefano Benassi, Bruno Bilotta, Luigi Maria Burruano, Francesco Carnelutti, Carla Cassola, Lorenza Indovina, Renato Izzo, Paolo Paoloni, Tony Sperandeo, Ricky Tognazzi	
O C T O B E R	19	The Nuttiest Nutcracker	Columbia TriStar Home Video / Dan Krech Productions / Pacific Title / Mirage	Harold Harris (director); Diane Eskenazi (screenplay); Debi Derryberry, Cam Clarke, Jim Belushi, Cheech Marin, Phyllis Diller, Desirée Goyette, Tress MacNeille, Jeff Bennett, Jim Cummings, Kevin Schon	
O C T O B E R	22	Bats	Destination Films	Louis Morneau (director); John Logan (screenplay); Lou Diamond Phillips, Dina Meyer, Bob Gunton, Leon, Carlos Jacott, David McConnell, Marcia Dangerfield, Oscar Rowland, Tim Whitaker, Juliana Johnson, James Sie, Ned Bellamy, George Gerdes	
O C T O B E R	22	The Best Man	Universal Pictures / 40 Acres and a Mule Filmworks	Malcolm D. Lee (director/screenplay); Taye Diggs, Nia Long, Morris Chestnut, Harold Perrineau, Terrence Howard, Sanaa Lathan, Monica Calhoun, Melissa De Sousa, Victoria Dillard, Regina Hall, Jim Moody, Jarrod Bunch, Stu 'Large' Riley, Linda Powell, Malcolm D. Lee, Dede McGuire, Aleisha Allen	
O C T O B E R	22	Body Shots	New Line Cinema	Michael Cristofer (director); David McKenna (screenplay); Sean Patrick Flanery, Jerry O'Connell, Amanda Peet, Tara Reid, Ron Livingston, Emily Procter, Brad Rowe, Sybil Temtchine	
O C T O B E R	22	Boys Don't Cry	Fox Searchlight Pictures	Kimberly Peirce (director/screenplay); Andy Bienen (screenplay); Hilary Swank, Chloë Sevigny, Peter Sarsgaard, Brendan Sexton III, Alicia Goranson, Jeannetta Arnette, Matt McGrath, Alison Folland, Lou Perryman, Cheyenne Rushing, Libby Villari	
O C T O B E R	22	Bringing Out the Dead	Paramount Pictures / Touchstone Pictures	Martin Scorsese (director); Paul Schrader (screenplay); Nicolas Cage, John Goodman, Ving Rhames, Tom Sizemore, Patricia Arquette, Marc Anthony, Mary Beth Hurt, Cliff Curtis, Nestor Serrano, Aida Turturro, Phyllis Somerville, Sonja Sohn, Michael K. Williams, Martin Scorsese, Queen Latifah, Afemo Omilami, Judy Reyes, Arthur J. Nascarella, Julyana Soelistyo, Marylouise Burke, Larry Fessenden, Theo Kogan, Craig muMs Grant, Jesse Malin, Harper Simon, Jon Abrahams, Charis Michelsen, Sylva Kelegian, James Hanlon, Michael Mulheren, David Zayas, Terry Serpico	
O C T O B E R	22	Crazy in Alabama	Columbia Pictures	Antonio Banderas (director); Mark Childress (screenplay); Melanie Griffith, David Morse, Lucas Black, Cathy Moriarty, Meat Loaf, Rod Steiger, John Beasley, Richard Schiff, Robert Wagner, Noah Emmerich, Sandra Seacat, Paul Ben-Victor, Brad Beyer, Fannie Flagg, Elizabeth Perkins, Linda Hart, Michael Arata, Paul Mazursky, Holmes Osborne, Tony Amendola, David Speck, Louis Miller, Carl Le Blanc III, Madison Mason, Randal Kleiser, Dakota Johnson, Kirk Fox	
O C T O B E R	22	Molly	Metro-Goldwyn-Mayer	John Duigan (director); Dick Christie (screenplay); Elisabeth Shue, Aaron Eckhart, Jill Hennessy, Thomas Jane, D.W. Moffett, Elizabeth Mitchell, Robert Harper, Elaine Hendrix, Michael Paul Chan, Lucy Liu, Jon Pennell, Sarah Wynter	
O C T O B E R	22	Three to Tango	Warner Bros. Pictures / Village Roadshow Pictures	Damon Santostefano (director); Rodney Patrick Vaccaro, Aline Brosh McKenna (screenplay); Matthew Perry, Neve Campbell, Dylan McDermott, Oliver Platt, Cylk Cozart, John C. McGinley, Bob Balaban, Deborah Rush, Kelly Rowan, Rick Gomez, Patrick Van Horn, David Ramsey, Barbara Gordon, Roger Dunn	
O C T O B E R	29	Being John Malkovich	USA Films	Spike Jonze (director); Charlie Kaufman (screenplay); John Cusack, Cameron Diaz, Catherine Keener, John Malkovich, Orson Bean, Mary Kay Place, Charlie Sheen, W. Earl Brown, Carlos Jacott, Willie Garson, Byrne Piven	
O C T O B E R	29	House on Haunted Hill	Warner Bros. Pictures / Dark Castle Entertainment	William Malone (director); Robb White, Dick Beebe (screenplay); Geoffrey Rush, Famke Janssen, Taye Diggs, Ali Larter, Bridgette Wilson, Peter Gallagher, Chris Kattan, Max Perlich, Jeffrey Combs, Lisa Loeb, James Marsters, Dick Beebe, Slavitza Jovan, Peter Graves, Greg Nicotero	
O C T O B E R	29	Music of the Heart	Miramax Films	Wes Craven (director); Pamela Gray (screenplay); Meryl Streep, Aidan Quinn, Gloria Estefan, Angela Bassett, Jane Leeves, Kieran Culkin, Jay O. Sanders, Cloris Leachman, Josh Pais, Michael Angarano, Jean-Luke Figueroa, Olga Merediz, Charlie Hofheimer, Betsy Aidem	
O C T O B E R	29	Princess Mononoke	Walt Disney Pictures / Studio Ghibli	Hayao Miyazaki (director/screenplay); Billy Crudup, Claire Danes, Minnie Driver, Billy Bob Thornton, Gillian Anderson, Keith David, Jada Pinkett Smith, Tara Charendoff, John DeMita, John DiMaggio, Debi Derryberry, Corey Burton, Julia Fletcher, Alex Fernandez, Jack Fletcher, Pat Fraley, John Hostetter, John Rafter Lee, Sherry Lynn, Matt K. Miller, Marnie Mosiman, Tress MacNeille, Matt McKenzie, Michael McShane, Dwight Schultz, Pamela Segall, Lewis Arquette, Mary Elizabeth McGlynn, Jessica Lynn, Adam Paul, David Rasner, K.T. Vogt	
N O V E M B E R	5	American Movie	Sony Pictures Classics	Chris Smith (director); Mark Borchardt, Mike Schank	
N O V E M B E R	5	The Bachelor	New Line Cinema	Gary Sinyor (director); Jean C. Havez (screenplay); Chris O'Donnell, Renée Zellweger, Artie Lange, Edward Asner, Hal Holbrook, James Cromwell, Marley Shelton, Peter Ustinov, Stacy Edwards, Mariah Carey, Sarah Silverman, Jennifer Esposito, Brooke Shields, Pat Finn, Romy Rosemont, Nicholas Pryor, Maree Cheatham, Niecy Nash, Nancy O'Dell, Scott Trimble, Katharine Towne, Rebecca Cross, Anastasia Horne	
N O V E M B E R	5	The Bone Collector	Universal Pictures / Columbia Pictures	Phillip Noyce (director); Jeremy Iacone (screenplay); Denzel Washington, Angelina Jolie, Queen Latifah, Michael Rooker, Mike McGlone, Luis Guzmán, Leland Orser, John Benjamin Hickey, Bobby Cannavale, Ed O'Neill, Olivia Birkelund, Gary Swanson, Zena Grey, Daniel Brochu, Steve Adams, Larry Day, Arthur Holden, Keenan MacWilliam, David Warshofsky, Ted Whittall, Fulvio Cecere, Phillip Noyce	
N O V E M B E R	5	The Insider	Touchstone Pictures / Spyglass Entertainment	Michael Mann (director/screenplay); Eric Roth (screenplay); Al Pacino, Russell Crowe, Christopher Plummer, Diane Venora, Philip Baker Hall, Lindsay Crouse, Debi Mazar, Stephen Tobolowsky, Colm Feore, Bruce McGill, Gina Gershon, Michael Gambon, Rip Torn, Lynne Thigpen, Hallie Kate Eisenberg, Michael Paul Chan, Linda Hart, Robert Harper, Nestor Serrano, Pete Hamill, Wings Hauser, Cliff Curtis, Renee Olstead, Mike Moore, Gary Sandy, Willie C. Carpenter, Roger Bart, Sayed Badreya, Douglas McGrath, Bill Sage, Wanda De Jesus, James Harper, Eyal Podell, Breckin Meyer, Vyto Ruginis, Saemi Nakamura, Jack Palladino	
N O V E M B E R	9	Mickey's Once Upon a Christmas	Walt Disney Home Video / Walt Disney Television Animation / Disney Video Premiere	Alex Mann, Bradley Raymond, Jun Falkenstein, Bill Speers, Toby Shelton (directors); Charlie Cohen, Thomas Hart, Scott Gorden, Tom Nance, Carter Crocker, Richard Cray, Temple Mathews, Eddie Guzelian (screenplay); Wayne Allwine, Russi Taylor, Tony Anselmo, Diane Michelle, Tress MacNeille, Alan Young, Bill Farmer, Corey Burton, Shaun Fleming, Jim Cummings, Jeff Bennett, Gregg Berger, Pat Musick, Frank Welker, Mae Whitman, April Winchell, Kylie Dempsey, Taylor Dempsey, Andrew McDonaugh	
N O V E M B E R	10	Light It Up	20th Century Fox / Fox 2000 Pictures	Craig Bolotin (director/screenplay); Usher Raymond, Forest Whitaker, Judd Nelson, Rosario Dawson, Robert Ri'chard, Sara Gilbert, Clifton Collins Jr., Fredro Starr, Vanessa L. Williams, Glynn Turman, Vic Polizos, Robert Lee Minor, Artel Great	
N O V E M B E R	10	Pokémon: The First Movie	Warner Bros. Pictures / Nintendo / 4Kids Entertainment / OLM, Inc.	Kunihiko Yuyama (director); Takeshi Shudo (screenplay); Veronica Taylor, Rachael Lillis, Eric Stuart, Phillip Bartlett, Ikue Ōtani, Maddie Blaustein, Kōichi Yamadera, Tara Sands, Jimmy Zoppi, Ed Paul, Lisa Ortiz, Megan Hollingshead, Satomi Kōrogi, Rodger Parsons, Shin-ichiro Miki, Lee Quick	
N O V E M B E R	12	Anywhere but Here	20th Century Fox / Fox 2000 Pictures	Wayne Wang (director); Alvin Sargent (screenplay); Susan Sarandon, Natalie Portman, Shawn Hatosy, Hart Bochner, Eileen Ryan, Ray Baker, John Diehl, Bonnie Bedelia, Faran Tahir, Caroline Aaron, Corbin Allred, Michael Milhoan, John Carroll Lynch, Steve Berra, Eva Amurri	
N O V E M B E R	12	Dogma	Lions Gate Films / View Askew Productions	Kevin Smith (director/screenplay); Ben Affleck, Matt Damon, Linda Fiorentino, Salma Hayek, Jason Lee, Jason Mewes, Kevin Smith, Alan Rickman, Chris Rock, George Carlin, Bud Cort, Alanis Morissette, Barret Hackney, Jared Pfennigwerth, Kitao Sakurai	
N O V E M B E R	12	Felicia's Journey	Artisan Entertainment / Alliance Atlantis / Icon Productions	Atom Egoyan (director/screenplay); Bob Hoskins, Elaine Cassidy, Arsinée Khanjian, Peter McDonald, Sheila Reid, Nizwar Karanj, Gerard McSorley, Marie Stafford	
N O V E M B E R	17	Liberty Heights	Warner Bros. Pictures / Baltimore/Spring Creek Pictures	Barry Levinson (director/screenplay); Adrien Brody, Ben Foster, Orlando Jones, Bebe Neuwirth, Joe Mantegna, Justin Chambers, Anthony Anderson, Rebekah Johnson, Gerry Rosenthal, David Krumholtz, Carolyn Murphy, Kevin Sussman, Shane West, Elizabeth Ann Bennett, Carlton J. Smith, Ralph Tabakin, Richard Kline, James Pickens Jr., Kiersten Warren, Charley Scalies, Katie Finneran, Jake Hoffman, Brenda Russell, Misha Collins, Stacy Keibler	
N O V E M B E R	19	Sleepy Hollow	Paramount Pictures / Mandalay Pictures	Tim Burton (director); Andrew Kevin Walker (screenplay); Johnny Depp, Christina Ricci, Miranda Richardson, Michael Gambon, Casper Van Dien, Jeffrey Jones, Christopher Lee, Richard Griffiths, Ian McDiarmid, Michael Gough, Christopher Walken, Marc Pickering, Lisa Marie, Steven Waddington, Claire Skinner, Alun Armstrong, Mark Spalding, Jessica Oyelowo, Tony Maudsley, Peter Guinness, Nicholas Hewetson, Orlando Seale, Sean Stephens, Gabrielle Lloyd, Robert Sella	
N O V E M B E R	19	The World Is Not Enough	United Artists / Eon Productions	Michael Apted (director); Neal Purvis, Robert Wade, Bruce Feirstein (screenplay); Pierce Brosnan, Sophie Marceau, Robert Carlyle, Denise Richards, Robbie Coltrane, Judi Dench, Desmond Llewelyn, John Cleese, Patrick Malahide, Colin Salmon, Maria Grazia Cucinotta, John Seru, Ulrich Thomsen, Goldie, David Calder, Samantha Bond, Omid Djalili, Serena Scott Thomas, Michael Kitchen, Claude-Oliver Rudolph	
N O V E M B E R	20	RKO 281	HBO Pictures / Scott Free Productions / BBC Films / WGBH Boston	Benjamin Ross (director); John Logan (screenplay); Liev Schreiber, James Cromwell, Melanie Griffith, Brenda Blethyn, Roy Scheider, John Malkovich, Liam Cunningham, David Suchet, Fiona Shaw, Anastasia Hille, Roger Allam, Simeon Andrews, William Armstrong, Jay Benedict, Ron Berglas, Paul Birchard, Neil Conrich, Michael Cronin, Sarah Franzl, Aaron Keeling, Joseph Long, Olivier Pierre, Roger Rose, Rolf Saxon, Adrian Schiller, Kerry Shale, Cyril Shaps, Tusse Silberg, Toby Whithouse, Tim Woodward, Angus Wright, Bobby Valentino, Lucy Cohu	
N O V E M B E R	24	End of Days	Universal Pictures / Beacon Pictures	Peter Hyams (director); Andrew W. Marlowe (screenplay); Arnold Schwarzenegger, Gabriel Byrne, Kevin Pollak, Robin Tunney, Rod Steiger, Udo Kier, CCH Pounder, Miriam Margolyes, Derrick O'Connor, Victor Varnado, Mark Margolis, Marc Lawrence, Denice D. Lewis, Renee Olstead, Mo Gallini, Robert Lesser, Gary Anthony Williams, Steve Kramer, Sven-Ole Thorsen, John Timothy Botka, Michael O'Hagan, Jonny Bogris	
N O V E M B E R	24	Flawless	Metro-Goldwyn-Mayer	Joel Schumacher (director/screenplay); Robert De Niro, Philip Seymour Hoffman, Barry Miller, Chris Bauer, Wilson Jermaine Heredia, Daphne Rubin-Vega, Skipp Sudduth, Rory Cochrane, Scott Allen Cooper, Jude Ciccolella, Mina Bern, Penny Balfour, Victor Rasuk, Richie Lamontagne, Luis Saguar	
N O V E M B E R	24	Mansfield Park	Miramax Films	Patricia Rozema (director/screenplay); Frances O'Connor, Jonny Lee Miller, Embeth Davidtz, James Purefoy, Alessandro Nivola, Harold Pinter, Lindsay Duncan, Victoria Hamilton, Justine Waddell, Hugh Bonneville, Sheila Gish, Charles Edwards, Hilton McRae, Sophia Myles, Anna Popplewell, Hannah Taylor-Gordon	
N O V E M B E R	24	Ride with the Devil	USA Films / Good Machine	Ang Lee (director); James Schamus (screenplay); Tobey Maguire, Skeet Ulrich, Jewel, Jeffrey Wright, Jonathan Brandis, Jim Caviezel, Tom Guiry, Jonathan Rhys Meyers, Simon Baker, Mark Ruffalo, Tom Wilkinson, Margo Martindale, John Ales, Celia Weston, John Judd, Don Shanks, John Durbin, Zach Grenier	
N O V E M B E R	24	Toy Story 2	Walt Disney Pictures / Pixar Animation Studios	John Lasseter (director); Andrew Stanton, Rita Hsiao, Doug Chamberlin, Chris Webb (screenplay); Tim Allen, Tom Hanks, Joan Cusack, Kelsey Grammer, Don Rickles, Jim Varney, Wallace Shawn, John Ratzenberger, Annie Potts, Estelle Harris, Wayne Knight, John Morris, Laurie Metcalf, R. Lee Ermey, Jodi Benson, Jonathan Harris, Joe Ranft, Jeff Pidgeon, Andrew Stanton, Jack Angel, Bob Bergen, Mary Kay Bergman, Rodger Bumpass, Corey Burton, Debi Derryberry, Bill Farmer, Pat Fraley, Jess Harnell, John Lasseter, Sherry Lynn, Mickie McGowan, Phil Proctor, Jan Rabson, Carly Schroeder, Madylin Sweeten, Lee Unkrich, Dave Foley, Robert Goulet, Jessica Evans, Hannah Unkrich	
N O V E M B E R	24	Tumbleweeds	Fine Line Features	Gavin O'Connor (director/screenplay); Angela Shelton (screenplay); Janet McTeer, Kimberly J. Brown, Gavin O'Connor, Jay O. Sanders, Laurel Holloman, Lois Smith, Michael J. Pollard, Cody McMains, Sara Downing, Ashley Buccille, Jennifer Paige	
D E C E M B E R	2	The End of the Affair	Columbia Pictures	Neil Jordan (director/screenplay); Ralph Fiennes, Julianne Moore, Stephen Rea, Jason Isaacs	
D E C E M B E R	3	Agnes Browne	USA Films / October Films	Anjelica Huston (director); John Goldsmith (screenplay); Anjelica Huston, Marion O'Dwyer, Ray Winstone, Arno Chevalier, Gerard McSorley, Tom Jones, Kate O'Toole, Jennifer Gibney, Brendan O'Carroll, Niall O'Shea, Ciaran Owens, Roxanna Williams, Carl Power, Mark Power, Gareth O'Connor, James Lappin	
D E C E M B E R	3	Holy Smoke!	Miramax Films	Jane Campion (director/screenplay); Anna Campion (screenplay); Kate Winslet, Harvey Keitel, Julie Hamilton, Tim Robertson, Sophie Lee, Daniel Wyllie, Paul Goddard, Pam Grier, Dhritiman Chatterjee, Hari Om Sharan	
D E C E M B E R	3	A Map of the World	First Look Studios	Scott Elliott (director); Peter Hedges, Polly Platt (screenplay); Sigourney Weaver, Julianne Moore, David Strathairn, Arliss Howard, Chloë Sevigny, Louise Fletcher, Sara Rue, Aunjanue Ellis, Nicole Ari Parker, Bruklin Harris, Lisa Emery, Ron Lea	
D E C E M B E R	3	Sweet and Lowdown	Sony Pictures Classics	Woody Allen (director/screenplay); Sean Penn, Samantha Morton, Anthony LaPaglia, Uma Thurman, James Urbaniak, John Waters, Gretchen Mol, Denis O'Hare, Molly Price, Brian Markinson, Tony Darrow, Daniel Okrent, Brad Garrett, Woody Allen, Ben Duncan, Nat Hentoff, Douglas McGrath, Kaili Vernoff	
D E C E M B E R	10	The Cider House Rules	Miramax Films	Lasse Hallström (director); John Irving (screenplay); Tobey Maguire, Michael Caine, Charlize Theron, Paul Rudd, Delroy Lindo, Erykah Badu, Heavy D, K. Todd Freeman, Kieran Culkin, Jane Alexander, Kathy Baker, Kate Nelligan, Paz de la Huerta, J. K. Simmons, Evan Parke, Jimmy Flynn, Erik Per Sullivan, Skye McCole Bartusiak, Spencer Diamond	
D E C E M B E R	10	Cradle Will Rock	Touchstone Pictures / Havoc	Tim Robbins (director/screenplay); Hank Azaria, Ruben Blades, Joan Cusack, John Cusack, Cary Elwes, Philip Baker Hall, Cherry Jones, Angus Macfadyen, Bill Murray, Vanessa Redgrave, Susan Sarandon, John Turturro, Emily Watson, Bob Balaban, Jack Black, Corina Katt Ayala, Victoria Clark, Kyle Gass, Paul Giamatti, Erin Hill, Barnard Hughes, Allan F. Nicholls, Gil Robbins, Jamey Sheridan, Barbara Sukowa, Harris Yulin, Daniel Jenkins, Chris McKinney, Henry Stram, Lee Arenberg, Allan F. Nicholls, Stephen Spinella, David Costabile, Gretchen Mol, Ned Bellamy, William Duell, Albert Macklin, Scott Sowers, Lynn Cohen, Dominic Chianese, Peter Jacobson, Evan Katz, Sarah Hyland, Audra McDonald, Gregg Edelman, Matthew Bennett, Michael Rivkin, Taylor Stanley, Boris McGiver, Chris Bauer, Leonardo Cimino, Carrie Preston, Ian Bagg, Tony Amendola, Peter Fernandez, Karen Lynn Gorney, Tim Robbins, Franklin D. Roosevelt	
D E C E M B E R	10	Deuce Bigalow: Male Gigolo	Touchstone Pictures / Happy Madison Productions	Mike Mitchell (director); Harris Goldberg, Rob Schneider (screenplay); Rob Schneider, William Forsythe, Eddie Griffin, Arija Bareikis, Oded Fehr, Gail O'Grady, Richard Riehle, Jacqueline Obradors, Big Boy, Amy Poehler, Dina Platias, Torsten Voges, Bree Turner, Allen Covert, Elle Tanner Schneider, Jacqueline Titone, Norm Macdonald, Adam Sandler, Marlo Thomas	
D E C E M B E R	10	The Green Mile	Warner Bros. Pictures / Castle Rock Entertainment	Frank Darabont (director/screenplay); Tom Hanks, David Morse, Bonnie Hunt, Michael Clarke Duncan, James Cromwell, Michael Jeter, Graham Greene, Doug Hutchison, Sam Rockwell, Barry Pepper, Jeffrey DeMunn, Patricia Clarkson, Harry Dean Stanton, Dabbs Greer, Eve Brent, William Sadler, Paula Malcomson, Brent Briscoe, Bill McKinney, Gary Sinise, Scotty Leavenworth, Gary Imhoff	
D E C E M B E R	10	Miss Julie	United Artists / Moonstone Entertainment	Mike Figgis (director); Helen Cooper (screenplay); Saffron Burrows, Peter Mullan, Maria Doyle Kennedy, Tam Dean Burn, Heathcote Williams, Joanna Page	
D E C E M B E R	11	Witness Protection	HBO NYC Productions	Richard Pearce (director); Daniel Therriault (screenplay); Tom Sizemore, Mary Elizabeth Mastrantonio, Forest Whitaker, Shawn Hatosy, Skye McCole Bartusiak, William Sadler, Jim Metzler, Greg Pitts, Daniel Zacapa, Greg Lipari Sr., Leon Russom, Joanna Merlin, Harrison Young, Randy Thompson, Byron Keith Minns, Shannon Cochran, Richard Portnow	
D E C E M B E R	12	K-911	Universal Studios Home Video	Charles T. Kanganis (director); Gary Scott Thompson (screenplay); James Belushi, Christine Tucci, James Handy, Wade Williams, Vincent Castellanos, Ron Yuan, Denise Dowse	
D E C E M B E R	15	Topsy-Turvy	USA Films / Pathé Distribution	Mike Leigh (director/screenplay); Jim Broadbent, Allen Corduner, Lesley Manville, Ron Cook, Eleanor David, Timothy Spall, Vincent Franklin, Martin Savage, Dexter Fletcher, Dorothy Atkinson, Shirley Henderson, Kevin McKidd, Louise Gold, Michael Simkins, Andy Serkis, Naoko Mori, Sukie Smith, Theresa Watson, Ashley Jensen, Mark Benton, Steve Speirs, Sam Kelly, Jonathan Aris, Alison Steadman, Adam Searle, Katrin Cartlidge, Brid Brennan	
D E C E M B E R	17	Anna and the King	20th Century Fox / Fox 2000 Pictures	Andy Tennant (director); Steve Meerson, Peter Krikes (screenplay); Jodie Foster, Chow Yun-fat, Bai Ling, Tom Felton, Geoffrey Palmer, Randall Duk Kim	
D E C E M B E R	17	Bicentennial Man	Touchstone Pictures	Chris Columbus (director); Isaac Asimov, Robert Silverberg, Nicholas Kazan (screenplay); Robin Williams, Sam Neill, Embeth Davidtz, Hallie Kate Eisenberg, Wendy Crewson, Oliver Platt, Kiersten Warren, Stephen Root, Bradley Whitford, John Michael Higgins, George D. Wallace, Lynne Thigpen, Lindze Letherman, Angela Landis, Igor Hiller	
D E C E M B E R	17	Fantasia 2000	Walt Disney Pictures	Don Hahn, Pixote Hunt, Hendel Butoy, Eric Goldberg, James Algar, Francis Glebas, Paul and Gaetan Brizzi (directors); Steve Martin, Itzhak Perlman, Bette Midler, Penn & Teller, James Earl Jones, Quincy Jones, Angela Lansbury, Wayne Allwine, Tony Anselmo, Russi Taylor	
D E C E M B E R	17	Magnolia	New Line Cinema	Paul Thomas Anderson (director/screenplay); Jeremy Blackman, Tom Cruise, Melinda Dillon, Philip Baker Hall, Philip Seymour Hoffman, Ricky Jay, William H. Macy, Alfred Molina, Julianne Moore, John C. Reilly, Jason Robards, Melora Walters, April Grace, Luis Guzmán, Thomas Jane, Emmanuel Johnson, Michael Murphy, Michael Bowen, Henry Gibson, Felicity Huffman, Eileen Ryan, Danny Wells, Pat Healy, Mark Flanagan, Neil Flynn, Allan Graf, Patton Oswalt, Brad Hunt, Jim Meskimen, Cleo King, Don McManus, Michael Shamus Wiles, John S. Davies, Miguel Perez, Meagen Fay, Patrick Warren, Orlando Jones, Clark Gregg, Matt Gerald, Paul F. Tompkins, Mary Lynn Rajskub, Jim Beaver, Ezra Buzzington, Robert Downey Sr., William Mapother, Lillian Adams, Paul Thomas Anderson, Aimee Mann, Miriam Margoyles	
D E C E M B E R	17	Stuart Little	Columbia Pictures	Rob Minkoff (director); M. Night Shyamalan, Greg Brooker (screenplay); Michael J. Fox, Geena Davis, Hugh Laurie, Jonathan Lipnicki, Nathan Lane, Chazz Palminteri, Steve Zahn, Bruno Kirby, Jennifer Tilly, David Alan Grier, Jeffrey Jones, Julia Sweeney, Jon Polito, Harold Gould, Connie Ray, Allyce Beasley, Brian Doyle-Murray, Estelle Getty, Patrick Thomas O'Brien, Stan Freberg, Taylor Negron, Jim Doughan, Dabney Coleman, Miles Marsico	
D E C E M B E R	21	Girl, Interrupted	Columbia Pictures	James Mangold (director/screenplay); Lisa Loomer, Anna Hamilton Phelan (screenplay); Winona Ryder, Angelina Jolie, Clea DuVall, Brittany Murphy, Elisabeth Moss, Angela Bettis, Vanessa Redgrave, Whoopi Goldberg, Jillian Armenante, Travis Fine, Kurtwood Smith, Jeffrey Tambor, Joanna Kerns, Ray Baker, Jared Leto, Bruce Altman, Mary Kay Place, KaDee Strickland, Misha Collins	
D E C E M B E R	21	Wakko's Wish	Warner Home Video	Liz Holzman, Rusty Mills (directors); Tom Ruegger (director/screenplay); Charles M. Howell IV, Earl Kress, Randy Rogel, Kevin Hopps, Nick DuBois (screenplay); Jess Harnell, Rob Paulsen, Tress MacNeille, Maurice LaMarche, Sherri Stoner, Nathan Ruegger, Nancy Cartwright, Frank Welker, John Mariano, Bernadette Peters, Julie Brown, Paxton Whitehead, Ben Stein, Jeff Bennett, Paul Rugg, Chick Vennera, Tom Bodett, Steven Bernstein	
D E C E M B E R	22	Any Given Sunday	Warner Bros. Pictures / Ixltan Productions / The Donners Company	Oliver Stone (director/screenplay); Daniel Pyne (screenplay); Al Pacino, Cameron Diaz, Dennis Quaid, Jamie Foxx, James Woods, LL Cool J, Matthew Modine, John C. McGinley, Charlton Heston, Ann-Margret, Lauren Holly, Bill Bellamy, Lela Rochon, Aaron Eckhart, Elizabeth Berkley, Marty Wright, Jim Brown, Lawrence Taylor, Clifton Davis, Andrew Bryniarski, James Karen, Gianni Russo, Duane Martin, Pat O'Hara, Mazio Royster, Rick Johnson, Allan Graf, Margaret Betts, Lester Speight, Eva Tamargo, Delia Sheppard, Jaime Bergman, Sean Stone, Antoni Corone, Dick Butkus, Terrell Owens, Ricky Watters, Irving Fryar, Joe Schmidt, Oliver Stone, Barry Switzer, Y.A. Tittle, Warren Moon, Johnny Unitas, Pat Toomay, Emmitt Smith, Wilt Chamberlain	
D E C E M B E R	22	Man on the Moon	Universal Pictures / Mutual Film Company / Jersey Films	Miloš Forman (director); Scott Alexander, Larry Karaszewski (screenplay); Jim Carrey, Danny DeVito, Courtney Love, Paul Giamatti, Gerry Becker, Leslie Lyles, George Shapiro, Richard Belzer, Patton Oswalt, Melanie Vesey, Michael Kelly, Vincent Schiavelli, Peter Bonerz, Michael Villani, Bob Zmuda, Chad Whitson, Tom Dreesen, Miles Chapin, Howard West, Greg Travis, Brent Briscoe, Angela Jones, Max Alexander, Reiko Aylesworth, Caroline Rhea, Mary Lynn Rajskub, Tracey Walter, David Koechner, Sydney Lassick, Chuck Zito, Norm Macdonald, Marilu Henner, Judd Hirsch, Christopher Lloyd, Carol Kane, Jeff Conaway, David Letterman, Paul Shaffer, Jerry Lawler, Jim Ross, Lance Russell, Budd Friedman, Lorne Michaels	
D E C E M B E R	22	Snow Falling on Cedars	Universal Pictures / The Kennedy/Marshall Company	Scott Hicks (director/screenplay); Ron Bass (screenplay); Ethan Hawke, Reeve Carney, James Cromwell, Richard Jenkins, James Rebhorn, Sam Shepard, Max von Sydow, Youki Kudoh, Anne Suzuki, Rick Yune, Seiji Inouye, Celia Weston, Cary-Hiroyuki Tagawa	
D E C E M B E R	25	Angela's Ashes	Paramount Pictures	Alan Parker (director/screenplay); Laura Jones (screenplay); Emily Watson, Robert Carlyle, Michael Legge, Kerry Condon, Ronnie Masterson, Pauline McLynn, Devon Murray, Eamonn Owens, Joe Breen, Ciaran Owens, Liam Carney, Eanna MacLiam, Andrew Bennett, Shane Murray Corcoran, Peter Halpin	
D E C E M B E R	25	Galaxy Quest	DreamWorks	Dean Parisot (director); Robert Gordon, David Howard (screenplay); Tim Allen, Sigourney Weaver, Alan Rickman, Tony Shalhoub, Sam Rockwell, Daryl Mitchell, Enrico Colantoni, Robin Sachs, Patrick Breen, Missi Pyle, Jed Rees, Justin Long, Jeremy Howard, Corbin Bleu, Wayne Pere, Samuel Lloyd, Bill Chott, Gregg Binkley, J. P. Manoux, Matt Winston, Brandon Keener, Dian Bachar, Rainn Wilson, Heidi Swedberg, Isaac C. Singleton Jr., Jerry Penacoli, Joel McKinnon Miller, Kevin McDonald, David Dorfman	
D E C E M B E R	25	The Talented Mr. Ripley	Paramount Pictures / Miramax Films	Anthony Minghella (director/screenplay); Matt Damon, Gwyneth Paltrow, Jude Law, Cate Blanchett, Philip Seymour Hoffman, Jack Davenport, James Rebhorn, Philip Baker Hall, Sergio Rubini, Celia Weston, Rosario Fiorello, Stefania Rocca, Ivano Marescotti, Anna Longhi, Alessandro Fabrizi	
D E C E M B E R	25	Titus	Fox Searchlight Pictures	Julie Taymor (director/screenplay); Anthony Hopkins, Jessica Lange, Alan Cumming, Colm Feore, James Frain, Laura Fraser, Harry Lennix, Angus Macfadyen, Matthew Rhys, Jonathan Rhys Meyers, Kenny Doughty, Colin Wells, Blake Ritson, Raz Degan, Geraldine McEwan	
D E C E M B E R	29	The Hurricane	Universal Pictures / Beacon Pictures	Norman Jewison (director); Armyan Bernstein, Dan Gordon (screenplay); Denzel Washington, Vicellous Reon Shannon, Deborah Kara Unger, Liev Schreiber, John Hannah, Dan Hedaya, Debbi Morgan, Clancy Brown, David Paymer, Harris Yulin, Rod Steiger, Badja Djola, Vincent Pastore, Al Waxman, Chuck Cooper, Beatrice Winde, Bill Raymond, George Odom, Tonye Patano, Fulvio Cecere, Bill Lake, Brenda Braxton, Muhammed Ali, Ellen Burstyn, Rubin "Hurricane" Carter, Bob Dylan, Joe Frazier	
D E C E M B E R	31	Onegin	Samuel Goldwyn Films / Rysher Entertainment / Starz! / CanWest Global Television Network / Seven Arts International	Martha Fiennes (director); Peter Ettedgui, Michael Ignatieff (screenplay); Ralph Fiennes, Liv Tyler, Toby Stephens, Lena Headey, Martin Donovan, Alun Armstrong, Harriet Walter, Irene Worth, Jason Watkins, Simon McBurney, Geoff McGivern, Tim McMullan, Tim Potter, Elizabeth Berrington, Richard Bremmer, Francesca Annis, Gwenllian Davies, Margery Withers	

== See also ==
- List of 1999 box office number-one films in the United States
- 1999 in the United States
