= The Sadness of Sex =

1995 film by Rupert Wainwright

- Directed by: Rupert Wainwright
- Screenplay by: Rupert Wainwrigh; Barry Yourgrau
- Based on: The Sadness of Sex by Barry Yourgrau
- Produced by: David Lancaster; Rupert Maconick; Rupert Wainwright
- Starring: Barry Yourgrau; Peta Wilson
- Cinematography: André Pienaar
- Edited by: Brian Berdan; Jeff Bessner (uncredited)
- Music by: Anne Dudley; Jay Ferguson; Nicholas Pike
- Production company: Skyvision Partners
- Distributed by: Filmworks
- Release dates: October 20, 1995; (Hamptons International Film Festival); April 1997 (Los Angeles); March 6, 1998 (United States)
- Running time: 87 minutes
- Country: Canada
- Language: English

The Sadness of Sex is a 1995 Canadian romantic comedy film directed by Rupert Wainwright, written by Tom Lazarus and Rick Ramage, and distributed by Metro-Goldwyn-Mayer Pictures.

== Plot ==
A series of vignettes explores the course of relationships from beginning to end.

== Cast ==
- Barry Yourgrau as The Host
- Peta Wilson as Girl of His Dreams
- Barbara Baumann as Demoiselle
- Mark Benesh as Son
- Buddy Brennan as Mayor's Assistant
- Richard Bulley as Dad
- Walter Connell as Banker
- Janice Guillaume as Lady
- John E. Holding as Banker
- Fielding Horan as Cupid
- Tina Moessner as Revolutionary
- Tara Monee as Revolutionary
- Kristie Norman as Revolutionary
- Andrea Officer as Lady
- Eugene Oleksiuk as Banker
- Jeffrey Peller as Police Officer
- Rachel Stewart as Lady
- Tim Trouten as Police Chief
- Stephen E. Turl as Banker
- Mandy Watts as Revolutionary
- Dianne Zeust as Mom

== Production ==
Filming took place in Toronto in 1994.

== Reception ==
Reviewer Kevin Thomas of the Los Angeles Times wrote, "In an era of short attention spans, Barry Yourgrau has emerged as a performance artist who holds audiences spellbound with his storytelling ability. He has now raised the ante by performing before a camera in 'The Sadness of Sex,' composed of 15 vignettes drawn from his collection of short stories of the same name. He and his director and co-adapter, Rupert Wainwright, have been remarkably inventive and resourceful in making their film as cinematic as possible, enriching rather than undercutting Yourgrau's considerable presence. [...] In the midst of a given story, Wainwright will deftly cut away from Yourgrau to a kaleidoscopic variety of visuals, including stills, clips from old movies and some staged moments in which Yourgrau and others actually act out a scene. Golden Palominos, Cowboy Junkies and Daniel Lanois, among others, provide rich and evocative musical accompaniment, which flows with the stories. This distinctive narrative technique culminates in an inspired parable, outrageous yet serious, that is dramatized as a mini-film noir. In it, Yourgrau suggests powerfully how men and women can feel sex and emotion divided within themselves. He emerges as a kind of private eye in search of a way to bring them together."

Reviewer Emanuel Levy of Variety wrote, "Original and often provocative, 'The Sadness of Sex,' a multimedia performance piece about the mysterious magic of love, is a demanding but not always easy or enjoyable film to watch. Excessive MTV-like style and consciously disjointed narrative undercut the emotional impact of the dense material, which is most appropriate for mature audiences who have experienced the bittersweet taste of love and its aftermath. Commercial prospects for disturbing film are skimpy, though it should travel the international festival road, perhaps even play the arthouse circuit."

== Release ==
The film premiered at the Hamptons International Film Festival on October 20, 1995, followed by a theatrical release in Los Angeles in April 1997.
