= Peta Wilson =

Australian actress and model (born 1970)

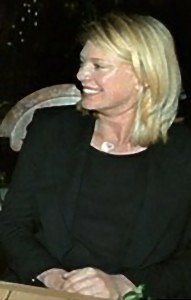
- Wilson in 2001
- Born: Peta Gia Wilson; 18 November 1970 (age 55); Sydney, New South Wales, Australia
- Occupations: Actress; designer; model
- Years active: 1995–present
- Known for: Nikita in La Femme Nikita
- Height: 5 ft 10 in (1.78 m)
- Partner: Damian Harris (1997–2002)
- Children: 1

Peta Gia Wilson (born 18 November 1970) is an Australian actress, lingerie designer, and model. She is best-known for her title role in the television series La Femme Nikita (1997–2001).

== Biography ==
=== Early life ===
Wilson was born in Sydney on 18 November 1970. She is the daughter of the caterer Karlene White Wilson and Darcy Wilson, a former Warrant Officer in the Australian Army. She spent several years in Papua New Guinea when her father was stationed there. Her parents divorced in 1982.

=== Career ===
Wilson began her career as a model in Australia and Europe before relocating to the United States in 1991. There, she studied acting with Arthur Mendoza at the Actors Circle Theatre. She made her debut in a few independent films, such as the comedy/romance The Sadness of Sex (1995) and the drama Naked Jane (1995).

In 1996, while preparing to continue her studies in New York City, Wilson auditioned for a new television series produced for the USA cable TV channel. Chosen from over 200 candidates, she was cast in the lead role of La Femme Nikita (1997–2001), the television adaptation of the 1990 French thriller of the same name. The Canadian‑American co‑production, filmed primarily in Toronto, Ontario, ran for five seasons and 96 episodes. Wilson’s co‑stars included Roy Dupuis, Don Francks, Alberta Watson and Eugene Robert Glazer; her performance earned her two Gemini Award nominations for Best Performance by an Actress in a Continuing Leading Dramatic Role.

After La Femme Nikita, Wilson starred in the thriller Mercy and, before leaving Toronto, appeared in the Showtime mini-series A Girl Thing (2001).

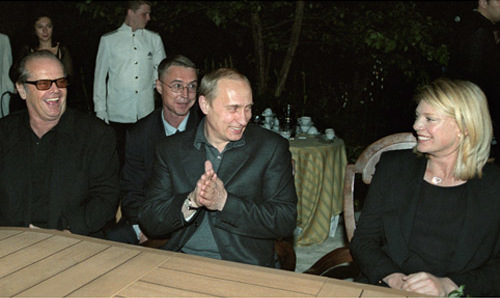
Peta Wilson with Jack Nicholson and Vladimir Putin in 2001

In 2001, she attended the Moscow International Film Festival alongside Jack Nicholson, Sean Penn and Tilda Swinton. Russian President Vladimir Putin, also present at the festival, reportedly confessed to being a fan of her television series La Femme Nikita.

In 2002, she portrayed real-life actress Anny Ondra in the television movie Joe and Max. Following this, she returned to Australia to focus on family life and give birth to her son. In 2003, Wilson played the vampire Mina Harker in The League of Extraordinary Gentlemen while on set in Prague with her one-year-old son. During her time in Australia, she also starred in the mystery mini-series Two Twisted (2006), appeared in Bryan Singer’s Superman Returns (2006), and took a leading role in the independent film Beautiful (2009).

Returning to Los Angeles in 2010, she made guest appearances on CSI: Miami and The Finder before launching her lingerie label Wylie Wilson in 2012, opening a flagship store in Los Angeles.

In the following years, she continued with smaller independent productions while maintaining a low public profile. She returned to television with a recurring role in the Australian series Troppo (2022). In 2025, Wilson appeared in Shane Black’s action film Play Dirty.

=== Personal life ===
Wilson lived with her longtime boyfriend, director Damian Harris, from 1997 until their separation in 2002. They have a son.

== Filmography ==
=== Film ===
Year	Title	Role	Notes
1995	The Sadness of Sex	Girl of His Dreams	
1995	Naked Jane	Marissa	
1996	Loser	Alyssha Rourke	
1997	One of Our Own	Corporal Jennifer Vaughn	
2000	Mercy	Vickie Kittrie	
2003	The League of Extraordinary Gentlemen	Mina Harker	
2006	Superman Returns	Bobbie-Faye	
2007	Gardens of the Night	Sarah	
2009	Beautiful	Sherrie	
2010	Errand Boy	Genie	Short film
2012	Liberator	Marla Criswell	Short film
2015	Dutch Kills	Ladye Bishop	Direct-to-video
2025	Play Dirty	Madge	

=== Television ===
Year	Title	Role	Notes
1996	Woman Undone	The Receptionist	TV movie
1996	Strangers	Martha	Episode: "Going Without"
1996	Highlander	Inspector	Episode: "Promises"
1997	Vanishing Point	Motorcycle Girl	TV movie
1997–2001	La Femme Nikita	Nikita	Title role
2001	Other People	Harriet Stone	Unsold pilot
2001	A Girl Thing	Alex	Miniseries
2002	Joe and Max	Anny Ondra	TV movie
2004	False Pretenses	Dianne / Deedee	TV movie
2005	Jonny Zero	Aly	2 episodes
2006	Two Twisted	Mischa Sparkle	Episode: "A Flash Exclusive"
2009	Malibu Shark Attack	Heather	TV movie
2010	CSI: Miami	Amanda	Episode: "Sudden Death"
2012	The Finder	Pope	Episode: "Little Green Man"
2017	Michael Hutchence: The Last Rockstar	Herself	TV documentary
2022	Troppo	Eve	Recurring role (season 1)

== Nominations ==
Year	TV Show	Award	Result
1998	La Femme Nikita	Gemini Award – Best performance by an actress in a continuing leading dramatic role	Nominated
1998	La Femme Nikita	OFTA Television Award – Best actress in a cable series	Nominated
1998	La Femme Nikita	Saturn Award – Best genre TV actress	Nominated
1999	La Femme Nikita	Gemini Award – Best performance by an actress in a continuing leading dramatic role	Nominated
2003	The League of Extraordinary Gentlemen	Saturn Award – Best supporting actress	Nominated
