= Tom Lazarus =

American screenwriter (born 1942)

- Born: Thomas Lewis Lazarus; October 5, 1942; New York City, U.S.
- Occupations: Writer, director, producer

Thomas Lewis Lazarus (born October 5, 1942) is an American screenwriter, director and producer. He is best known for writing the 1999 horror film Stigmata, and is the author of the screenwriting manuals, Secrets of Film Writing (2001, Griffin) and The Last Word: Definitive Answers to All Your Screenwriting Questions (2012, Michael Wiese Productions).

Lazarus has won more than two dozen international film festival honors including Best Educational Film of the Year at the San Francisco Film Festival and a nomination for a CLIO for directing a Fair House Public Service TV spot.

== Life and career ==
Lazarus was born in New York City on October 5, 1942. He began working in advertising for film studios. He also designed album covers, was nominated for a Grammy, then moved into creating educational and business films. This led to a television and film career, where he has written and produced since the 1970s, including Knight Rider, War of The Worlds and Freddy's Nightmares.

In 1999, he wrote Stigmata, starring Patricia Arquette as an atheist who is afflicted with the stigmata after acquiring a rosary owned by a deceased priest. Directed by Rupert Wainwright on a $29 million budget, it premièred at the box office in the #1 position, earning $18.3 million in its first weekend, and becoming the first film in five weekends to outgross The Sixth Sense at the box office. It earned $50,046,268 in the U.S. and $39,400,000 internationally, for a total worldwide gross of $89,446,268.

He teaches at UCLA Extension, Writers Program.

== Filmography ==
- The American Dream (1976)
- The President's Mistress (TV Movie) (1978)
- Survival of Dana (TV Movie) (1979)
- Just You and Me, Kid (1979)
- The Ordeal of Bill Carney (TV Movie) (1981)
- Side by Side: The True Story of the Osmond Family (TV Movie) (1982)
- Hear No Evil (TV Movie) (1982)
- Mazes and Monsters (TV Movie) (1982)
- The Awakening of Candra (TV Movie) (1983)
- Centerfold (1996)
- Stigmata (1999)
