= Stigmata (film) =

1999 film by Rupert Wainwright

- Theatrical release poster
- Directed by: Rupert Wainwright
- Screenplay by: Tom Lazarus; Rick Ramage
- Story by: Tom Lazarus
- Produced by: Frank Mancuso Jr.
- Starring: Patricia Arquette; Gabriel Byrne; Jonathan Pryce; Nia Long; Rade Šerbedžija
- Cinematography: Jeffrey L. Kimball
- Edited by: Michael R. Miller
- Music by: Billy Corgan; Mike Garson; Elia Cmiral
- Production companies: Metro-Goldwyn-Mayer; FGM Entertainment
- Distributed by: Metro-Goldwyn-Mayer
- Release date: September 10, 1999
- Running time: 102 minutes
- Countries: United States; Mexico
- Languages: English; Italian; Aramaic; Portuguese
- Budget: $29 million
- Box office: $89.4 million

Stigmata is a 1999 supernatural horror film directed by Rupert Wainwright, written by Tom Lazarus and Rick Ramage, and starring Patricia Arquette, Gabriel Byrne, Jonathan Pryce, Nia Long, and Rade Šerbedžija. The film follows an atheist hairdresser (Arquette) who is afflicted with stigmata after acquiring a rosary formerly owned by a deceased Italian priest who himself had suffered from the phenomenon. A Jesuit priest (Byrne) is appointed to investigate her supernatural—and ultimately, divine—experiences. The film is an international co-production between the United States and Mexico.

Development of Stigmata began in 1992, when Wainright first read Lazarus and Ramage's screenplay for the film. Frank Mancuso, Jr. greenlit the project in 1998, with his production company FGM Entertainment co-producing the film with Metro-Goldwyn-Mayer. Principal photography took place in Los Angeles and Mexico City. The film's score was composed by Billy Corgan, Mike Garson, and Elia Cmiral.

Stigmata was theatrically released in the United States on September 10, 1999. Despite receiving generally negative reviews, the film was a surprise hit at the box office, earning $18.3 million during its opening weekend and ranking first place over The Sixth Sense, which had held the top spot for weeks prior. The film ultimately grossed $89.4 million worldwide against a budget of $29 million. It was nominated for Best Horror Film at the 26th Saturn Awards.

== Plot ==
In the Brazilian village of Belo Quinto, Father Andrew Kiernan, a former scientist and a Jesuit priest who investigates supposed miracles, examines a statue of the Virgin Mary weeping blood at the funeral of Father Paulo Alameida, who had previously experienced stigmata. While Andrew is collecting evidence, a young boy steals a rosary from the father's hand. The boy later sells it to a woman who sends it as a gift to her daughter, Frankie Paige, a hedonistic young hairdresser living in Pittsburgh.

Frankie is later attacked by an unseen force while bathing, and sustains two deep puncture wounds on her wrists. Doctors suspect the wounds are self-inflicted, which Frankie denies. Later, while riding the train home from work, Frankie appears to become possessed and confronts a priest named Father Durning, asking him if he is Kieran. Moments later, she is attacked and flagellated by an unseen force. While Frankie is hospitalized again, Father Durning sends security tapes showing the attack to the Vatican, and Andrew is sent to investigate.

Andrew interviews Frankie, believing her wounds may also be stigmata. When she says that she is an atheist, Andrew tells her that stigmata occurs when the deeply devoted are struck with the five wounds that Jesus received during the crucifixion. Frankie begins to research on her own what the cause could be. Later while in a nightclub, her head begins to bleed from the third stigmata wound caused by the Crown of Thorns. Frankie runs home, where Andrew is waiting, and then runs into an alley. As Andrew pursues her, Frankie smashes a glass bottle and uses the shards to carve symbols on the hood of a car: when Andrew approaches her, she yells at him in another language.

Andrew takes Frankie to Father Durning's church, and the Vatican translates what she was yelling in Aramaic. The next morning, Andrew returns to her apartment to find her writing on the wall, now covered in Aramaic. Frankie talks in a male voice, speaking Italian. Wounds appear on her feet, the fourth wound of stigmata. Andrew emails photographs of Frankie's apartment wall to Vatican, where Brother Delmonico recognizes the words and deletes the pictures. He tells Andrew the words are from a document the church found that looked to be an entirely new gospel. Father Dario hears it and shows the pictures to Cardinal Daniel Houseman, who also recognizes them. Delmonico phones Marion Petrocelli and tells him the missing gospel has been found in Pittsburgh.

Andrew goes to Frankie's apartment to find the wall she wrote on painted over, and Frankie attempts to seduce him. When Andrew rejects her, she attacks him and denounces his beliefs in a male voice, ending with Frankie levitating off the bed, crying tears of blood. Houseman and Dario arrive with Durning and take Frankie to another church, sending Andrew to Durning's.

At Durning's church, Andrew meets Petrocelli, who tells him the words Frankie has been writing are part of the document—the Dead Sea Scrolls—found outside Jerusalem they believed to be a gospel in the exact words of Jesus. Petrocelli, Delmonico and Alameida were assigned to translate it, but Houseman ordered them to stop. Alameida refused and stole the document to continue translating it alone, having been excommunicated by Houseman. Petrocelli tells Andrew that the document was Jesus telling his disciples that the Kingdom of God is in all of us and not confined to churches. Petrocelli tells Andrew that Alameida suffered from stigmata.

Andrew races to the church where Frankie is, while Houseman and Dario attempt to perform an exorcism on Frankie. Frankie shouts at them in a male voice, and Houseman attempts to strangle her. Andrew stops him, and the room is set on fire. Now believing Frankie is possessed by Alameida's spirit, Andrew offers to be Alameida's messenger instead. He walks unharmed through the fire to retrieve Frankie, bidding Alameida's spirit to depart in peace.

Some time later, Andrew returns to Belo Quinto and finds the original documents for the lost gospel in Alameida's church. Text just before the end credits describes the discovery of the Gospel of Thomas, stating that the Catholic Church refuses to recognize the document as a gospel and considers it heresy.

== Cast ==
- Patricia Arquette as Frankie Paige
- Gabriel Byrne as Father Andrew Kiernan
- Jonathan Pryce as Cardinal Daniel Houseman
- Nia Long as Donna Chadway
- Rade Šerbedžija as Marion Petrocelli
- Enrico Colantoni as Father Dario
- Jack Donner as Father Paulo Alameida
- Thomas Kopache as Father Durning
- Dick Latessa as Father Gianni Delmonico
- Portia de Rossi as Jennifer Kelliho
- Patrick Muldoon as Steven
- Ann Cusack as Dr. Reston
- Shaun Toub as Doctor

== Production ==
=== Development ===
Development of Stigmata was first announced in January 1998, when Frank Mancuso Jr. announced his intention to produce a supernatural thriller helmed by Rupert Wainwright. Wainwright first came across Tom Lazarus' script for Stigmata in 1992 and spent the next five years trying to get the film greenlit. Mancuso immediately greenlit the film upon meeting with Wainwright and being shown the screenplay, with Rick Ramage hired to work out script issues over the next nine months.

=== Filming ===
An apartment building in Los Angeles, California, was used as the residence of Patricia Arquette's character. Meanwhile, the interior scenes of the Vatican were filmed at Palacio de Bellas Artes (the Palace of Fine Arts) in Mexico City. The interior locations of the Pittsburgh archdiocese where Frankie was exorcised were also filmed in the same Palacio de Bellas Artes building. The fictional Brazilian town of Belo Quinto was filmed in Tijuana, Baja California, using a rural area of the city and a nearby church as the local church of the fictional Belo Quinto.

== Release ==
Metro-Goldwyn-Mayer released Stigmata theatrically in North America on September 10, 1999.

=== Home media ===
MGM Home Entertainment released Stigmata on VHS and DVD in 2000.

Scream Factory released the film for the first time on Blu-ray on May 19, 2015. The Australian distributor Umbrella Entertainment released a limited edition Blu-ray set on December 6, 2023. Capelight Pictures subsequently reissued the film on DVD and Blu-ray in the United States in a mediabook edition on April 2, 2024.

== Reception ==
=== Box office ===
Stigmata premiered at the United States box office in the number one position, earning $18.3 million in its first weekend, becoming the first film in five weekends to outgross The Sixth Sense. The film's financial success was a surprise to its distributor, Metro-Goldwyn-Mayer, who had little faith that it would perform well at the box office. Stigmata grossed a total of $50,046,268 in the United States, and $39,400,000 in other territories, for a worldwide total of $89,446,268.

=== Critical response ===
On the review aggregator website Rotten Tomatoes, 22% of 91 critics' reviews are positive. The website's consensus reads: "The story is unconvincing and the acting is weak." Metacritic, which uses a weighted average, assigned the film a score of 28 out of 100, based on 31 critics, indicating "generally unfavorable" reviews. Audiences polled by CinemaScore gave the film an average grade of "B−" on an A+ to F scale.

Kenneth Turan of the Los Angeles Times praised the film's performances and found the subject matter compelling, writing: "Stigmata are a very real phenomenon (reference books say that some 300 cases have been attested) and screenwriters Tom Lazarus and Rick Ramage and director Rupert Wainwright have used them as a shrewd point of departure for what is essentially a late-’90s MTV version of The Exorcist, a half-serious, half-silly piece of business that keeps us involved despite (or maybe because of) being more than a little overdone... despite its surreal plotting, [the film] has a kernel of genuine interest that is sporadically involving." James Berardinelli of ReelViews praised the film as "an unusually intelligent and original thriller. While it loosely resembles end-of-the-world efforts like The Seventh Sign, the plot is more thoughtful and restrained. Stigmata takes an unflinching look at the power of and the capability for corruption in organized religion. There is an extensive back story that students of early Christian writings will appreciate, and the ultimate message embraced by the film is one of deep spiritual significance."

In his two-star review, Roger Ebert called it "possibly the funniest movie ever made about Catholicism — from a theological point of view." Desson Howe of The Washington Post unfavorably described the film as "an orgy of overwrought stylistics. Musically, the soundtrack is shrouded with pop-style doom and gloom, a hipster's cacophony of rhythm and ruse. Wainwright, whose head might rotate if I whispered 'subtlety' too loudly, meets nothing he can't render in a monstrous close-up, or a doubled image, or in extreme slow motion. It's a miracle our eyes don't bleed."

Jay Carr of The Boston Globe praised Arquette's and Byrne's performances, but criticized the film's tone and imagery, noting: "Eeriness and otherworldliness are crowded off the screen by an overaggressive attack mentality that send images cascading across the screen as if being dished out by the church of MTV. Soon the images of blood, especially blood spreading as it drops into water, arrive at a point of diminishing returns."

=== Accolades ===
Award/association	Year	Category	Recipient(s) and nominee(s)	Result	Ref.
Blockbuster Entertainment Awards	2000	Favorite Actress – Horror	Patricia Arquette	Nominated	
Blockbuster Entertainment Awards	2000	Favorite Actor – Horror	Gabriel Byrne	Nominated	
Blockbuster Entertainment Awards	2000	Favorite Supporting Actor – Horror	Jonathan Pryce	Nominated	
Golden Raspberry Awards	2000	Worst Supporting Actor	Gabriel Byrne	Nominated (Note: Shared with performance in End of Days.)	
Motion Picture Sound Editors	2000	Best Sound Editing – Music	Kenneth Karman; Mike Flicker; Stephen Lotwis; Billy Corgan	Nominated	
Saturn Awards	2000	Best Horror Film	Stigmata	Nominated	
