= Leslie Lowe =

English cricketer (born 1948)

Personal information
- Full name: Leslie Lowe
- Born: 4 February 1948 (age 78); Knypersley, Staffordshire, England
- Batting: Right-handed
- Bowling: Right-arm medium

Domestic team information
- Years: Team
- 1966–1978: Staffordshire

Career statistics
Competition	List A
Matches	1
Runs scored	7
Batting average	–
100s/50s	–/–
Top score	7*
Balls bowled	72
Wickets	–
Bowling average	–
5 wickets in innings	–
10 wickets in match	–
Best bowling	–
Catches/stumpings	1/–
- Source: Cricinfo, 17 June 2011

Leslie Lowe (born 4 February 1948) is a former English cricketer. Lowe was a right-handed batsman who bowled right-arm medium pace. He was born in Knypersley, Staffordshire.

Lowe made his debut for Staffordshire in the 1966 Minor Counties Championship against Durham. Lowe played Minor counties cricket for Staffordshire from 1966 to 1978, which included 27 Minor Counties Championship matches. In 1975, he made his only List A appearance against Leicestershire in the Gillette Cup. In this match, he scored 7 unbeaten runs and in the field he took a single catch.
