= Luis Oropeza =

Mexican footballer (born 1995)

Personal information
- Full name: Luis Enrique Oropeza Sonoqui
- Date of birth: 27 October 1995 (age 31)
- Place of birth: Hermosillo, Sonora, Mexico
- Height: 1.70 m (5 ft 7 in)
- Position: Midfielder

Youth career
- 2012: América

Senior career*
| Years | Team | Apps | (Gls) |
| 2012–2020 | Sonora | 83 | (5) |
| 2021–2023 | UNAM | 0 | (0) |
| 2021–2023 | → Pumas Tabasco (loan) | 40 | (1) |
- * Club domestic league appearances and goals as of 14 April 2022

Luis Enrique Oropeza Sonoqui (born 27 October 1995) is a Mexican professional footballer who played as a midfielder.

== Playing career ==
Oropeza got the attention of Cimarrones de Sonora while playing for the Club América U17 team. He started playing for their affiliate farm team in the Tercera División, Poblado Miguel Alemán FC. He helped them win the 2013–14 reserve championship. He scored 23 goals in 26 matches between 2013 and 2015, including 4 in one game against Universidad Autónoma de Sinaloa.

Oropeza played two matches in 2013 and one in 2014 with the first team, while they were still in the Segunda División, but finally made his professional debut in Ascenso MX on 14 August 2015, when the Cimarrones played Coras de Tepic to a 0–0 draw. He came in as a 62' substitution for Jorge Aparicio. He made 78 league appearances in the second tier with the club from 2015 to 2020, recording six goals.

Oropeza scored his final goal for Cimarrones against Tampico Madero on 24 January 2020, but the remainder of the Clausura 2020 season was cancelled in April due to the COVID-19 pandemic in Mexico. When the team returned for pre-season in July, he was not retained due to a new rule stating that teams can only have eight players over the age of 23 on the roster, even though he still had time left on his contract.

After over year out of football, he joined Pumas Tabasco in May 2021.
