= Rupert Wainwright =

English director, writer and actor

Rupert Wainwright is an English film and television director, with credits including Blank Check (1994), The Sadness of Sex (1995) and Stigmata (1999). He is also a music video producer and multiple award-winner.

British-born, Wainwright was one of the youngest directors accepted in the Discovery Program sponsored by Columbia Pictures. He established a reputation for making award-winning television advertisements (including Reebok) and music videos (most notably M.C. Hammer).

Originally an actor, appearing in Another Country (1984) and Dreamchild (1985), Wainright later directed the ABC film Dillinger (1991) starring Mark Harmon. In 2005, he directed the supernatural horror film The Fog.

He also appeared in an episode of the reality TV show The Millionaire Matchmaker, where love matchmaker and dating guru Patti Stanger was tasked with finding him a potential love match.

Wainwright directed the cinematic teaser for Michael Jackson's 1995 album HIStory: Past, Present and Future, Book I, which premiered in theaters and on television worldwide. In 2023, he appeared as a guest at Kingvention, the annual Michael Jackson fan convention in London, to discuss his work on the teaser and Jackson's music videos.

== Music videos ==
Wainwright attended UCLA on a Fulbright Scholarship where he started directing music videos. He most notably produced and directed multiple videos for M.C. Hammer (such as "U Can't Touch This"), which contributed to Hammer becoming a worldwide phenomenon. He has also worked with artists such as N.W.A and Michael Jackson, winning five MTV Video Music Awards, a Grammy Award (including two nominations) and many other awards.

Wainwright also directed Please Hammer Don't Hurt 'Em: The Movie, along with John Oetjen (video producer), winning a Grammy for Best Music Video, Long Form at the 33rd Grammy Awards.

== Filmography ==
TV movie

- Open Window (1989) (Also writer)
- Dillinger (1991)
- Untitled Secret Service Project (2002)

Feature film

- Blank Check (1994)
- The Sadness of Sex (1995)
- Stigmata (1999)
- The Fog (2005)

Television

Year	Title	Director	Writer	Notes
2001	Wolf Lake	Yes	No	Unaired pilot
2003	The Sitcom Trials	No	Yes	Episode "Go Wild in the Country vs The Client"
2008	Fear Itself	Yes	No	Episode "Echoes"
