= Verge =

Verge, Le Verge, Vergé or The Verge may refer to:

== People ==
- David Vergé
- Jack Verge (died 1915), Australian rugby union player
- John Verge (1782–1861), English architect, builder and pioneer settler of New South Wales, Australia
- Lynn Verge (born c. 1951), Canadian lawyer and politician
- Marianne Le Verge (born 1979), French former swimmer who competed in the 1996 Summer Olympics
- Roger Vergé (1930–2015), French chef and restaurateur
- Wade Verge, 21st century Canadian politician
- William E. Verge (1901–1973), United States Navy rear admiral

== Music ==
- Verge (album), musical compilation album by I've Sound
- The Verge (album), a 2011 album by the band There for Tomorrow
- "Verge" (song), a 2015 song by Owl City
- Verge music festival

== Media ==
- The Verge (XM), a Canadian satellite radio station
- The Verge, a technology news network
- The Verge, a live videogame news and review TV programme on Vuzu in South Africa

== Other uses ==
- Verge (cryptocurrency), a secure and anonymous cryptocurrency
- Verge, the jurisdiction of the Marshalsea Court
- Verge or virge, a ceremonial rod
- Road verge, a strip of grass or other vegetation beside a road
- The Verge, Singapore, a defunct shopping mall in Singapore
- Verge Rocks, Graham Land, Antarctica
- Verge escapement, a clock escapement mechanism
- Verge3D, a 3D web authoring software
- Verge (royal court) an area of special legal jurisdiction around the English royal court

== See also ==
- On the Verge (disambiguation)
- Verges (disambiguation)
