= Aida Diestro =

- Also known as: La Gorda de Oro
- Born: Adelaida Diestro Rega; 21 December 1924; San Nicolás de Bari, Mayabeque Cuba
- Died: 28 October 1973 (aged 48) Havana, Cuba
- Genres: Filin, bolero, canción, guaracha, mambo
- Occupations: Musician, bandleader
- Instrument: Piano
- Years active: 1931-73
- Label: RCA Victor
- Formerly of: Cuarteto d'Aida

Adelaida Diestro Rega (21 December 1924 – 28 October 1973), better known as Aida Diestro, was a Cuban pianist and the director of the famous vocal group Cuarteto d'Aida.

== Career ==
Diestro was born in Havana on 21 December 1924. She studied music with her father, the Presbyterian minister Vicente Diestro Camejo, and continued in a private conservatory. She became the choir director of her father's church, which taught her a great deal about harmony which came in useful later. Aida learnt more from the musician and composer Enrique González Mántici, and his guidance played a decisive role in her future career. Years later she said: "Mantici gave me the confidence to confront the prejudices which female artistes encountered in those days."

Diestro's first professional engagements was as a pianist on the radio, accompanying artists such as César Portillo de la Luz and Tania Castellanos. Her big moment came when, in 1952, she formed the Cuarteto d'Aida, which became one of the most famous groups of its day. It was a close-harmony group of the filin style, with four brilliant young women. The four were Elena Burke, Omara Portuondo and her sister Haydée, and Moraima Secada. The group, backed by male musicians, sang regularly on the television show El Show del Mediodía, but only produced one LP record. The original group continued until 1960, and were replaced as they left. After Aida's death the group was led by Teté Caturla.
