= On the Verge =

On the Verge may refer to:

- On the Verge (film), a 2008 independent documentary film
- On the Verge (play), a 1987 play by Eric Overmyer also known as On the Verge (or The Geography of Yearning)
- On the Verge (radio), an Irish radio show
- On the Verge (TV series), a 2021 Netflix series created by Julie Delpy
- On The Verge, a technology talk show produced by The Verge

== Music ==
- On the Verge, a 2013 blues album by The Fabulous Thunderbirds
- "On the Verge" (song), by Collin Raye
- "On the Verge", a song by Le Tigre from This Island

== See also ==
- Verge (disambiguation)
