= Teté Caturla =

Cuban singer (1937–2023)

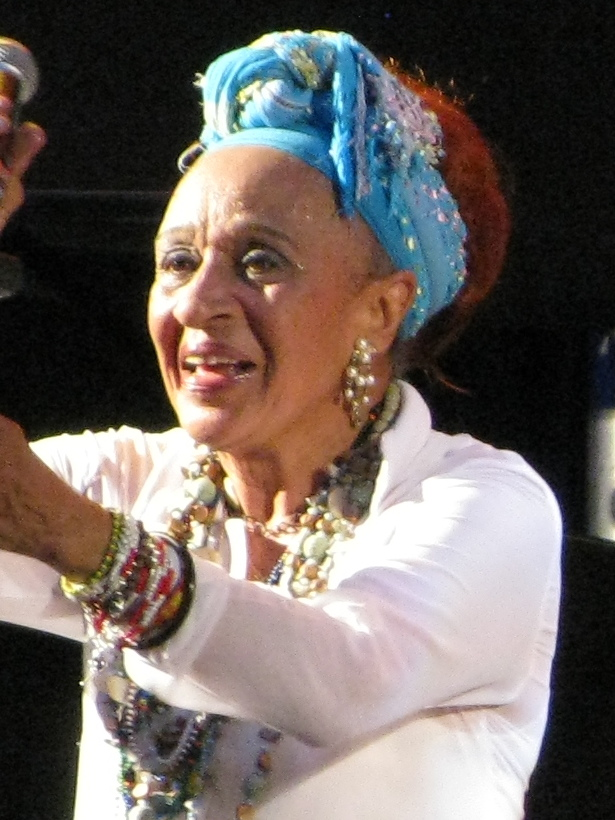
- Caturla in 2009
- Born: Regla Teresa García Rodríguez; October 12, 1937; Remedios, Cuba
- Died: September 4, 2023 (aged 85); Havana, Cuba
- Occupation: singer

Regla Teresa García Rodríguez (12 October 1937 – 4 September 2023), known as Teté Caturla, was a Cuban singer who directed the vocal group Cuarteto d'Aida. She was the daughter of Alejandro García Caturla, one of the most important Cuban composers of the 1920s and 1930s.

Caturla was born on October 13, 1937, in Remedios, Villa Clara Province, Cuba. As a young woman she made her debut for Orquesta Anacaona, and in 1963 she joined Cuarteto d'Aida. Both of these were all-female groups. After Aida Diestro, the founder of the quartet, died in 1973, Teté led them, and they toured Panama (1978), Grenada (1979), Mexico (1983), Spain (1984), Angola (1986), and Finland (1987). More recently she toured Argentina, France, Japan, Greece, and the United States.

After her retirement from the quartet, she formed the group Rumba Tere for young musicians recently graduated from their schools of music. Her work was always in the traditional popular music of Cuba. In 2003, the CD Llegó Teté (Bis Music) was released celebrating Caturla's 40 years of professional life, and the following year, it won the Gran Premio Cubadisco.

Caturla appeared briefly as a contributing singer in the 2015 video "Chan Chan - Song Around the World" by the Playing for Change movement. She can be seen performing on a balcony in Havana, Cuba.

Teté Caturla died on September 4, 2023, at the age of 85.
