= Board of Green Cloth =

English court

The Board of Green Cloth was a board of officials belonging to the Royal Household of England and Great Britain. It took its name from the tablecloth of green baize that covered the table at which its members sat.

It audited the accounts of the Royal Household and made arrangements for royal travel. It also sat as a court upon offences committed within the verge of the palace. While it existed until modern times, its jurisdiction was more recently limited to the sale of alcohol, betting and gaming licences for premises falling within the areas attached to or governed by the Royal Palaces.

== Officers ==
The members of the Board were:

- the Lord Steward, head of the board
- the Treasurer of the Household
- the Comptroller of the Household
- the Cofferer of the Household (abolished 1782)
- the Master of the Household
- the Clerks of the Green Cloth (increased in number from four to six in 1761; abolished in 1782 in favour of two Clerks of the Household, who were themselves abolished in 1815).
- the Secretary to the Board (from 1813); assisted by three clerks to the Board from 1815 (who were not themselves members of the Board).

In later years the Chief Metropolitan Magistrate, though not a member of the Board, was always in attendance (that office was abolished in 2000).

== History ==
The origins of the Board are found in the Wardrobe, which had been a powerful financial office of the monarch in the 13th century, but by the 1360s its power had waned: it 'ceased to be the directive force of the Household, and remained simply as the office of Household accounts'; as such it was gradually subsumed into the Household and by the end of the century the Wardrobe's officers (the Treasurer, the Comptroller, the Cofferer and his Clerks) were firmly under the authority of the Lord Steward.

The name 'Board of Green Cloth' first appears in the Tudor period. The eponymous green tablecloth was later described as having depicted on it 'the Arms of the Accompting-House, viz. Vert, a Key Or and a Staff Argent Saltire, signifying their Power to reward or punish'. The Board's judicial functions derived from the historic authority of the Lord Steward within the royal Court to dispense the King's justice; it dealt with minor disputes, small debts and breaches of the peace within the Verge. (More serious cases were dealt with by other courts connected with the Lord Steward such as the Marshalsea Court).

In the early modern period the Board routinely met twice a week, wherever the monarch was residing, to draw up accounts of daily expenditure, to order and pay for provisions, and 'to see to the good government of the Sovereign's household servants'. The Board's offices were at Whitehall until 1715, and afterwards at St James's and then at Buckingham Palace.

In the 1720s the Board was described as 'a Court of Justice continually sitting in the King's house', to which was entrusted 'the Charge and Oversight of the King's Court-Royal, for Matters of Justice and Government, with Authority for maintaining the Peace within the Verge of the Court, and with Power of correcting all the Servants of his Majesty's House, as shall in any matter offend'.

In 1924 the Lord Steward's Department (incorporating the Board of Green Cloth) was redesignated the Master of the Household's Department. The Board continued to supervise the Household accounts, purchase provisions and manage members of staff. Latterly the Board, which was chaired by the Master of the Household, met once a year to license public houses within the Verge; this meeting was usually a formality, with the licensees applying jointly and the licences being routinely awarded (unless the Metropolitan Police or the local heath authority raised an objection).

Until 2004, the Board had jurisdiction as a licensing authority over a number of premises in Westminster (that were within the verge of Buckingham Palace) that would have otherwise been the responsibility of the local magistrates' court, including Carlton House Terrace, the northern end of Whitehall and the National Gallery. The Board of Green Cloth disappeared in the reform of local government licensing in 2004, brought about by the Licensing Act 2003 (section 195). However, royal palaces remained outside the scope of the Act, and do not require a premises licence to serve alcohol.
