= Secada =

Secada is a surname. Notable people with the surname include:

- Jon Secada (born 1961), Cuban American and Afro-Cuban singer-songwriter
- Moraima Secada (1930–1984), Cuban singer
