= Omara Portuondo =

Cuban singer and dancer (born 1930)

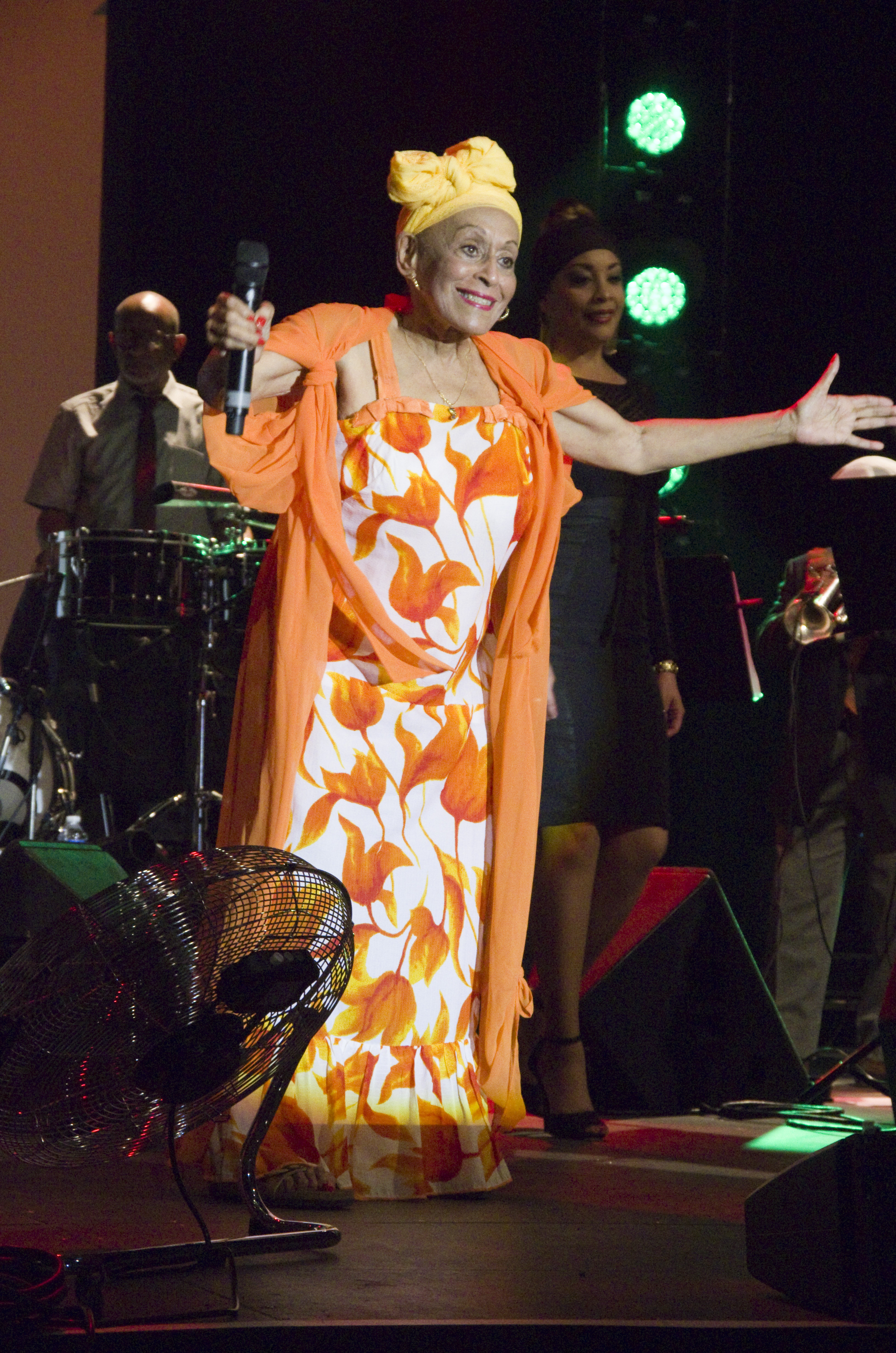
- Portuondo in 2015

Background information
- Born: Omara Portuondo Peláez; 29 October 1930 (age 95); Havana, Cuba
- Genres: Bolero, canción, vocal jazz, son, guaracha
- Occupations: Singer, dancer
- Years active: 1950–present
- Labels: Velvet, Areito, World Circuit
- Website: www.omaraportuondo.com

Omara Portuondo Peláez (born 29 October 1930) is a Cuban singer and dancer. A founding member of the popular vocal group Cuarteto d'Aida, Portuondo has collaborated with many important Cuban musicians during her long career, including Julio Gutiérrez, Juanito Márquez and Chucho Valdés. Although primarily known for her rendition of boleros, she has recorded in a wide range of styles from jazz to son cubano. Since 1996, she has been part of the Buena Vista Social Club project, touring extensively and recording several albums with the ensemble. She won a Latin Grammy Award for Best Contemporary Tropical Album in 2009, a Latin Grammy Award for Best Traditional Tropical Album in 2023, a Latin Grammy Lifetime Achievement Award in 2019, and she received three Grammy Award nominations in 2019 and a nomination in 2024.

== Early life and career ==
Born on 29 October 1930 in the Cayo Hueso neighborhood of Havana, Portuondo had three sisters. Her mother, Esperanza Peláez, came from a wealthy family of Spanish ancestry, and had created a scandal by running off with and marrying a black professional baseball player, Bartolo Portuondo. Omara joined the dance group of the Cabaret Tropicana in 1950, following her elder sister, Haydee. She also danced in the Mulatas de Fuego in the theatre Radiocentro, and in other dance groups. The two sisters also used to sing for family and friends, and they also performed in Havana clubs. In 1947, Portuondo and Haydee joined the Loquibambia Swing, a group formed by the blind pianist Frank Emilio Flynn.

From 1952–1953, she sang for the Orquesta Anacaona, and later in 1953 both sisters joined (together with Elena Burke and Moraima Secada) the singing group Cuarteto d'Aida, formed and directed by pianist Aida Diestro. The group had considerable success, touring the United States, performing with Nat King Cole at the Tropicana, and recording a 1957 album for RCA Victor. In 1958, pianist and composer Julio Gutiérrez invited Portuondo to sing for his ensemble in a series of recordings bridging jazz and Cuban music for the record label Velvet. The result was Magia Negra, her debut solo album. Haydee left the Cuarteto d'Aida in 1961 in order to live in the US, and Omara continued singing with the quartet until 1967.

== 1967–present ==
In 1967, Portuondo began to focus on her solo career, recording two albums for Areito, Omara Portuondo and Esta es Omara Portuondo. In the same year she represented Cuba at the Sopot Festival in Poland, singing Juanito Márquez' "Como un milagro". Alongside her solo work, in the 1970s she sang with the charanga Orquesta Aragón, and toured with them abroad.

In 1974, she recorded with guitarist Martín Rojas, an album in which she lauds Salvador Allende and the people of Chile a year after the military coup led by General Augusto Pinochet. Among other hits from the album, she sang Carlos Puebla's hit "Hasta Siempre, Comandante", which refers to Ché Guevara. She also recorded "Y que se sepa", with one of the most successful Cuban bands of the late 20th century, Los Van Van. Later on she performed with Juan Formell, singing Formell's song "Tal vez", a song she recorded later on with Maria Bethania. During the 1970s and 1980s, Portuondo enjoyed success at home and abroad, with tours, albums (including one of her most lauded recordings in 1984 with Adalberto Álvarez), film roles, and her own television series.

In 2004, the International Red Cross appointed her International Ambassador, the first Cuban musician to hold this title, in Montreal, Canada. In 2007, she performed the title role to sold-out audiences in Lizt Alfonso's dance musical "Vida", the story of modern Cuba through the eyes and with the memories of an old woman. In this same year, her performance at the Montreal Jazz Festival was released on DVD. She recorded in 2008 a duet album with Brazilian singer Maria Bethânia named Maria Bethânia e Omara Portuondo. In 2008, she recorded the album Gracias as a tribute to the 60th anniversary of her singing career. Today, Omara lives in a high-rise apartment just off the Malecón, Havana, overlooking the sea. She remains a popular fixture on the local music scene, singing regularly at the Tropicana Club, the Delirio Habanero and the Café Cantante.

=== Buena Vista Social Club ===
Portuondo sang (duetting with Ibrahim Ferrer) on the album Buena Vista Social Club in 1996. This led not only to more touring (including playing at Carnegie Hall with the Buena Vista troupe) and her appearance in Wim Wenders' film Buena Vista Social Club, but to two further albums for the World Circuit label: Buena Vista Social Club Presents Omara Portuondo (2000) and Flor de Amor (2004). She remains a member of Buena Vista Social Club, being the only original vocalist to do so.

== Discography ==
- Magia Negra (Velvet, 1959. Reissued by Kubaney 190 and Kristal 1124) – With Julio Gutiérrez
- Seis Voces y un Sentimiento (Egrem 3123, 1960)
- Omara Portuondo (Areito 3358, 1967)
- Esta es Omara Portuondo (Areito 1071, 1967)
- Omara Portuondo: Omara! (Areito 3478, 1974)
- Omara Portuondo & Martín Rojas (Love Records, 1975) – With Martín Rojas
- Y Tal Vez (Areito 3837, 1981)
- Canta El Son (Areito 4071, 1983)
- Omara Portuondo, Adalberto Alvarez Y Su Son (Sonografica 40022, 1984) – With Adalberto Y Su Son
- Pensamiento (Artex TKF-CD-14, 1992)
- Palabras (Intuition/Nubenegra INT 31862, 1996)
- Buena Vista Social Club (World Circuit, 1997)
- Desafios (Intuition/Nubenegra 1025, 1998) – With Chucho Valdés
- Oro Musical (Max Music, 1999)
- Buena Vista Social Club Presents Omara Portuondo (World Circuit, 2000)
- Omara Portuondo: Roots of Buena Vista (Egrem CD0173, 2000)
- Roots of Buena Vista: La Novia Del Feeling (Egrem CD0178, 2000) – With Orquesta Todos Estrellas
- La Gran Omara Portuondo (Egrem CD0414, 2000)
- Dos Gardenias (Tumi Records, 2001)
- La Sitiera (WEA, 2001)
- You (King, 2001)
- Joyas Inéditas (Egrem 0514, 2002)
- La Colección Cubana (Nascente, 2003)
- Flor De Amor (World Circuit, 2004)
- Together (Havana Nites HN003, 2004) – With Ibrahim Ferrer
- Together Again (Havana Nites HN004, 2004) – With Ibrahim Ferrer
- Sentimiento (La Escondida, 2005)
- Lágrimas Negras (Canciones y Boleros) (Yemaya, 2005)
- The Essential Omara Portuondo (Manteca, 2006)
- Quiereme Mucho (PID, 2006)
- Together (Soliton, 2006) – With Celina González
- Singles (Malanga Music MM 803, 2007)
- Duets (Malanga Music MM 812, 2007)
- Maria Bethânia e Omara Portuondo (Biscoito Fino, 2008) – With Maria Bethânia
- Gracias (World Village, 2008)
- Omara & Chucho (Random Music, 2011) – With Chucho Valdés
- Magia Negra: The Beginning (World Village, 2014)
- Omara Siempre (Egrem, 2018)
- Mariposas (Bis Music, 2020)
- Vida (One World Music, 2023)

== Selected filmography ==
- Buena Vista Social Club (1999)
- Live in Montreal (2007)
- Omara Portuondo & Maria Bethânia Live (2008)
- Omara & Chucho (2011)

== See also ==
- Filin (music)
- Elena Burke
