= Verges =

Verges may refer to:

== Places ==
- Verges, Catalonia, Spain
- Verges, Jura, France

== People ==
- Vergès, French surname
- Bruno Verges (born 1975), rugby league player
- Dominica Verges (1918–2002), Cuban singer
- Marta Rovira i Vergés (born 1977), Spanish lawyer and politician
- Martí Vergés (born 1934), Spanish footballer
- Olimpio Otero Vergés (1845–1911), Puerto Rican merchant, attorney, composer
- Rosa Vergés (born 1955), Spanish film director who won a 1991 Goya Award
- Troy Verges, American songwriter
- Verges, a character in William Shakespeare's play Much Ado About Nothing
- Josep Vergés i Matas, editor and publisher of Josep Pla

== See also ==
- Verge (disambiguation)
- Vargas (disambiguation)
