= Derek Wheatley =

English barrister, legal advisor and novelist

Derek Peter Francis Wheatley QC (died 23 September 2018) was an English barrister, legal advisor and novelist.

Wheatley was educated at University College, Oxford, going up to Oxford in 1944. He became a barrister and was involved with the case of Isabel Earl, who was tried at the Old Bailey for murder. As a barrister, he handled both criminal and commercial cases. Subsequently, he was a Recorder (judge) of the Crown Court and a Deputy Coroner of the Queen's Household (1959–64).

Later, he joined Lloyds Bank as its Chief Legal Advisor. Wheatley wrote many articles for newspapers and legal journals. He also wrote a novel, The Silent Lady (Mona Lisa), based on his experiences as a barrister, especially the Isabel Earl case.

He died on 23 September 2018 at the age of 92.
