= Elena Burke =

Background information
- Born: February 28, 1928; Havana, Cuba
- Died: June 9, 2002 (aged 74); Havana, Cuba
- Genres: Bolero, romantic ballads
- Years active: 1940s-2002

Elena Burke (born Romana Elena Burgues Gonzalez on February 28, 1928, in Havana, Cuba – June 9, 2002 in Havana, Cuba) was a revered and popular Cuban singer of boleros and romantic ballads.

== Biography ==
She started her career by working in radio in the 1940s but also began to work with smaller groups and appearing in nightclubs accompanied at the piano by Dámaso Pérez Prado.

In 1948 she accompanied the Cuban dancers known as "Las Mulatas de Fuego" (The Mulatas of Fire) to Mexico City, where she performed in the movie Salón México, directed by Indio Fernández.

In 1952, pianist and arranger Aida Diestro organized the vocal quartet called Cuarteto d'Aida. The original members were Elena Burke, Moraima Secada, Omara Portuondo and Haydée Portuondo. After she got some attention, she went solo. By the time of the Cuban Revolution she was a top solo artist performing in elegant cabarets in Havana. Her voice seemed to become stronger with age, as her subtle yet sophisticated technique graced every song she sang with an emotional weight.

Over the years she performed with top Cuban dance bands such as Orquesta Aragón, and with highly acclaimed singer-songwriters, including Pablo Milanés. She certainly could "take a sad song and make it better", piercing the emotional veil of her audience with an almost palpable sincerity, winning the moniker "Señora Sentimiento" (Lady Feeling).

In 1978 she performed with the Orquesta Aragón at New York's Lincoln Center to great acclaim.

Though she mostly interpreted classic Cuban boleros and Son, her versions were distinct, supported by top-notch musicians and arrangements.

She is the mother of Malena Burke and grandmother of Lena, also well known Cuban singers.
