= Bentley Purchase =

British forensic pathologist (1890–1961)

Sir William Bentley Purchase CBE MC (31 December 1890 – 27 September 1961) was a British physician and barrister. He pursued a career in medical examination and served, from 1930 to 1958, as the coroner with jurisdiction over much of London. He is best known for his role in the development of Operation Mincemeat, a deception operation during the Second World War.

== Biography ==
Bentley Purchase's father, Sir William Henry Purchase of Luton, was a successful importer of straw goods such as hats. The family had means to enroll young Bentley in Sidney Sussex College, Cambridge, where he pursued the liberal arts. Graduating from Cambridge in 1911, Purchase studied law and entered medical studies at the London Hospital, graduating in 1914. Bentley was commissioned as a medical officer in the Royal Artillery on the Western Front in 1914–18, and was awarded the Military Cross in 1917.

Upon the coming of peacetime Purchase continued his career pathway and resumed his interrupted legal and medical studies, becoming a barrister in the Inner Temple in 1919 and a Bachelor in Medicine in 1921. He was now qualified to serve as a coroner with jurisdiction over cases that required the presence of a medical examiner. He worked two part-time jobs in the 1920s, as a lawyer and as a deputy coroner within East London. During this period he married Beryl Chapman, with whom he had two children.

In 1930, upon the retirement of the coroner Sir Walter Schröder, Bentley Purchase won appointment as a full-fledged coroner. His jurisdiction shifted over different neighbourhoods within London, but always included the broad area of dense population from the City of Westminster on the southwest to Islington toward the northeast. Purchase served as an official coroner within London from 1930 until 1958, winding down in that year by moving his office from London to Ipswich. In August 1955, he was appointed Coroner of the Queen's Household, a part-time position in the Royal Household, in succession to W. H. L. McCarthy.

Purchase served in office as the Ipswich coroner until his death in 1961, which occurred by mishap. Attempting to repair his television antenna, the lawyer-physician tumbled from the roof of his private home. He was aged 70.

== Significant cases ==
As coroner, Purchase held approximately 20,000 inquests into deaths that, in his medico-legal judgement, deserved formal inquiry. In cases where the cause of death was unknown or where inquiries were required to assist the police, Purchase worked closely with specialists in forensic pathology such as Bernard Spilsbury and Keith Simpson. Murder cases inquired into by Purchase included homicides committed by John Christie and John Haigh.

Also as coroner, Purchase provided a corpse in 1943 for use in Operation Mincemeat. The aim of Operation Mincemeat was to allow documents, purported to be central to Allied operations in the Mediterranean, to fall into the hands of German military intelligence. The fake documents were intended to mislead the Germans regarding the intended path of the coming invasion of southern Europe. A central element of the deception operation was to release, into Spanish territorial waters, a dead body dressed in the uniform of a British Royal Marine officer. The body was intended to be seen as that of a courier whose plane had crashed in the Mediterranean Sea while he was carrying top-secret operational planning documents. These documents indicated that the Allies were planning to enter Europe through Greece and the Balkans, instead of the actual invasion route, which was through Sicily. German military intelligence, the Abwehr, gained access to the forged documents through Spanish intelligence, and were convinced that the documents were authentic. The German armed forces moved reinforcements to Greece, and did not take steps to establish tactical air command over Sicily at the time of the Allies' amphibious assault. Operation Mincemeat is generally believed to have saved thousands of lives.

== Legacy and honours ==
During his active life in London, Bentley Purchase was made a Commander of the Order of the British Empire in 1949. Upon the winding-down of his responsibilities in 1958, he accepted a knighthood. After his death in 1961, a friendly biography (Robert Jackson, Coroner: the Biography of Sir Bentley Purchase, London: George G. Harrap and Co.), was published in 1963. Purchase was played by Paul Ritter in the 2022 film Operation Mincemeat.
