= Anacaona (band) =

Cuban band

Anacaona was an all-female orchestra, founded in Havana, Cuba in the early 1930s by Concepción "Cuchito" Castro Zaldarriaga and her sisters. Eventually, all 11 sisters joined the band. The band was formed during the Machado era when the political situation led to university closings, forcing Cuchito Castro to abandon her studies and her plan to start a dental practice. Instead, she chose a different career in 1932 by proposing a female septet to challenge the male-dominated son music. At the time, it was believed women were not capable of playing son. The band enjoyed close musical ties with well-known Cuban performers, in particular with Ignacio Piñeiro and Lázaro Herrera of the Septeto Nacional. Graciela, whose brother Machito laid the foundations of Latin Jazz, was Anacaona's lead singer for a decade.

== History ==
Cuchito's sisters and friends came together as a group, naming it after the Taino queen Anacaona. The septet made its first official appearance in February 1932, at the Payret Theater in Havana. Performing on the radio and also nightly in the aires libres, open-air cafes, they soon found an enthusiastic audience. The members of the original 1932 septet were Isabel Álvarez, Berta Cabrera, Elia O'Reilly and the four Castro sisters–Ada, Olga "Bola", Cuchito and Ondina. Later on Caridad “Cachita”, Emma, Flora, Alicia, Argimira “Millo”, Xiomara and Yolanda joined the jazz band. Anacaona toured Cuba (1933), Puerto Rico (1935), Mexico (1936), Panama, Colombia and Venezuela (1937). In 1937 the septet published three records with RCA-Victor, then the worldwide leading music label. In the winter of the same year the Anacaona septet was the top act at a newly inaugurated night club on Broadway called „Havana Madrid“. The band was invited to perform at NBC's New York radio station, at the Hotel Commodore, Hotel Pierre, and the Waldorf Astoria where a show was held for Franklin D. Roosevelt’s birthday. The band travelled on to Paris in 1938 with Alberto Socarrás, known as the “Magician on the Flute”. Anacaona was a smash as a jazz band in Les Ambassadeurs on the Champs-Elysées. Later in the evening the Anacaona son septet alternated with Django Reinhardt and his Quintett du Hot Club de France at the Chez Florence in Montmartre. Shortly before World War II the band returned to Cuba.

With concerts in New York and Paris, Anacaona rose to international fame.1947 Anacaona starred for two seasons in the musical show of the Casino Nacional of Havana under the direction of Cuban composer Ernesto Lecuona. The band made its screen debut in the film A La Habana me Voy (Off to Havana I go). They appeared in several other films in Mexico together with film star and rumba dancer Ninón Sevilla. Popular female singers such as Celia Cruz, Omara Portuondo (Buena Vista Social Club), Haydée Portuondo, Moraima Secada and Dominica Verges joined Anacaona during the forties and fifties.

Performing as a show band that played Mambo, Cha-cha-chá and Latin Jazz, Anacaona toured through South America in 1958 and appeared on radio and television as well as in theaters in Brazil, Uruguay, Argentina and Chile. Meanwhile, the revolutionaries led by Fidel Castro were on the move and had taken over when the band returned to Cuba. In 1962 Anacaona joined Cuba's National Council of Culture (Consejo Nacional de la Cultura) and later became part of the Ignacio Piñeiro state enterprise for traditional music. Although internationally the band faded from view, it remained very popular in Cuba and the original line-up continued to play until 1989.

=== Revival ===
The band was reorganized in 1989. The remaining five Castro sisters chose to leave the band, which is still active under the lead of Georgia and Dora Aguirre, the band's bassists. Since 1991 Anacaona has recorded several CDs and performed in more than 20 countries, including the United States, Canada and China. On the occasion of the band's 85th anniversary it toured Cuba in 2017.

== Books ==
Alicia Castro's Queens of Havana: The Amazing Adventures of the Legendary Anacaona, Cuba's First All-Girl Dance Band (Grove Press, 2007) is a history of the band which concentrates on the band's early period. The British edition is titled Anacaona: The Adventures of Cuba's Most Famous All-Girl Orchestra. Margarita Engle's Drum Dream Girl: How One Girl's Courage Changed Music tells the story of Millo's childhood and her experience as a drummer in Anacaona.

== Musical ==
A musical inspired by the sisters life and set at the time of the revolution in 1958 was produced by Youth Music Theatre UK in 2012.

== Discography ==
- Anacaona in its original line-up
  - Maleficio, Bésame aquí, Algo Bueno, Oh, Marambé Maramba, Amor Inviolado, Después que sufras (RCA-Victor, 1937)
  - Septeto Anacaona & Ciro Rimac, 1936-1937 (Harlequin Records, 1994)
  - Anacaona: The Buena Vista Sisters’ Club. The Amazing Story of Cuba’s Forgotten Girl Band (Termidor, 2008) ASIN: B00131TDNK
  - Anacaona - Ten Sisters of Rhythm. Termidor Musikverlag/Pimienta Records, 2002. DVD ASIN: B01GWC2D2C
  - Buena Vista Sisters’ Club. (Pa’ti Pa’ mi/Termidor Musikverlag, 2008) DVD ASIN: B00131TDNA
- Anacaona today
  - ¡Ay! (Discmedi 1992)
  - Como un milagro (Bis Music, 1995)
  - Lo que tú esperabas ... (Lusafrica, 2000)
  - Cuba le canta a Serrat vol. II (Discmedi, 2007)
  - No lo puedo evitar (Bis Music, 2008)
