= Bartolo Portuondo =

Cuban baseball player (1893–1981)

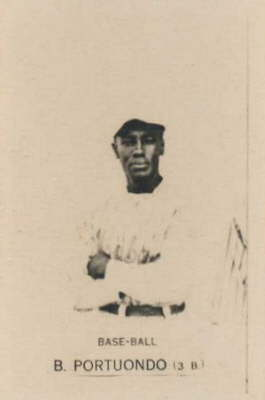
- Infielder
- Born: August 24, 1893; La Habana, Cuba
- Died: May 26, 1981 (aged 87)
- Batted: Right Threw: Right

Cuban League debut
- 1911/12, for the Havana Park

Last Negro leagues appearance
- 1927, for the Cuban Stars (East)

Teams
- Havana Park (1911/12); Almendares Cubans (1915); San Francisco Park (1915/16); Cuban Stars (East) (1916, 1923–1927); White Sox (1916/17); Cuban Stars (West) (1917–1919); Almendares (1919/20–1920/21, 1922/23, 1925/26); Kansas City Monarchs (1920–1922); Habana (1923/24); Cuba (1926/27); Marianao (1926/27)

Bartolome Portuondo (August 24, 1893 – May 26, 1981) was a Cuban professional baseball infielder in the Cuban League and the U.S. Negro leagues. In Cuba he played from 1911/12 to 1926/27 with several teams, most notably Almendares. His American career lasted from 1915 to 1927; he played for the Cuban Stars (East), Cuban Stars (West), and the Kansas City Monarchs, among other teams.

Portuondo's wife was a member of a wealthy white Cuban family. Their daughter Omara Portuondo became an internationally known singer.
