= W. H. L. McCarthy =

Lieutenant Colonel W. H. L. McCarthy DSO MVO MC*

Coroner of the King's/Queen's Household
- In office March 1934 – August 1955
- Monarchs: George V; Edward VIII; George VI; Elizabeth II

Personal details
- Born: William Hilgrove Leslie McCarthy; 1885
- Died: 16 September 1962 (aged 76–77)
- Spouse: Evelyn (m. 1921)
- Education: Trinity College, Dublin; University of Oxford
- Civilian awards: Member of the Royal Victorian Order

Military service
- Allegiance: United Kingdom
- Branch/service: British Army
- Years of service: 1909–1919; 1940–1941
- Rank: Lieutenant colonel
- Unit: Royal Army Medical Corps
- Battles/wars: First World War; Second World War
- Military awards: Military Cross (2); Distinguished Service Order

Lieutenant Colonel William Hilgrove Leslie McCarthy, DSO, MVO, MC* (1885 – 16 September 1962), known as Leslie McCarthy, was an Irish-British physician and British Army officer, who served as coroner of the King's/Queen's Household from 1934 to 1955. He received multiple decorations while serving as a medical officer in the Royal Army Medical Corps (Special Reserve) during the First World War.

== Early life and education ==
McCarthy was born in 1885 in Listowel, County Kerry, Ireland. In 1903, he matriculated into Trinity College, Dublin, studied medicine. He won the Reid Scholarship in his first year of university. He graduated first in his year in 1909 with a Bachelor of Medicine (MB) degree. He then undertook further training at St Thomas' Hospital, London, and worked as a physician in Paris and Vienna. In 1911, he earned the degree of Doctor of Medicine (MD) from Dublin and was also awarded a Diploma in Public Health (DPH) by the University of Oxford.

== Career ==
On 17 November 1909, McCarthy was commissioned in the Royal Army Medical Corps, Special Reserve of Officers, as a lieutenant (on probation). His commission and rank were confirmed in April 1910. He was promoted to captain on 17 May 1913.

As a member of the Special Reserve, McCarthy was called up at the start of the First World War. He was posted to France as a medical officer with the Irish Guards in 1914. During the war, he moved from being a front line medical officer to commanding field ambulances. He was mentioned in despatches in June 1915 and in January 1916. On 1 January 1916, he was awarded the Military Cross (MC) "for distinguished service in the Field".

On 30 November 1916, he was promoted to acting lieutenant colonel upon his appointment as commanding officer of a field ambulance. He relinquished the rank of lieutenant colonel on 2 July 1917 upon reposting, but on 17 July 1917, he was once more promoted to lieutenant colonel and given command of a field ambulance. On 26 August 1917, he again relinquished the rank of lieutenant colonel upon reposting. He was promoted to acting major on 22 April 1918, before relinquishing the rank on 14 May 1918 following reposting. On 24 May 1918, he was appointed commanding officer of a medical unit and promoted to acting lieutenant colonel. He was awarded a bar to his Military Cross (i.e. awarded the MC for a second time) on 13 September 1918.

Capt. William Hilgrove Leslie McCarthy, M.C., M.D., R.A.M.C., Spec. Res.
For conspicuous gallantry and devotion to duty. This officer, hearing that an Aid Post was filled with wounded who could not be evacuated by the normal route, owing to the enemy bombardment, led a party of stretcher-bearers through heavy shell fire and reorganised the evaluation. He dressed four wounded men in the open on the way up, and made several journeys during the day.

— Bar to MC gazetted 13 September 1918

On 8 February 1919, McCarthy relinquished his commission in the Royal Army Medical Corps on account of ill health from wounds sustained during the First World War; he had been wounded three separate times. He was allowed to retain the rank of lieutenant colonel. In March 1919, he was awarded the Distinguished Service Order (DSO) for his actions in the final days of the war.

Capt. (A./Lt.-Col.) William Hilgrove Leslie McCarthy, M.C., R.A.M.C. (Spec. Res.), attd. 19th Fd. Amb.
During the operations connected with the crossing of the Sambre, 4th to 8th November 1918, he exhibited marked gallantry and devotion to duty. He was in command of the advanced dressing station and maintained the closest touch with the front line troops, arranging for the immediate evacuation of casualties as they occurred. He worked continuously for three days and three nights, and his energy, able management and devotion to duty saved many lives.

— DSO gazetted 7 March 1919

In addition to medicine, McCarthy chose to study law and was called to the bar at Inner Temple in 1920. From 1924 until he retired in 1950, he was medical officer of health for the Metropolitan Borough of Chelsea in London, England. He was additionally medical officer to Inner Temple and Middle Temple, and served as a deputy coroner in the counties of London and Middlesex.

In March 1934, McCarthy was appointed Coroner of the King's Household by King George V. He was re-appointed on the succession of King Edward VIII in July 1936, of George VI in March 1937, and of Queen Elizabeth II in August 1952. In the 1955 Birthday Honours, he was appointed Member of the Royal Victorian Order (MVO). In August 1955, he stepped down as Coroner of the Queen's Household and was succeeded by Bentley Purchase.

Following the outbreak of the Second World War, he rejoined the Royal Army Medical Corps on 26 January 1940 as a lieutenant. On 28 June 1941, having reached the rank of war substantive captain, he relinquished his commission and resumed the rank of lieutenant colonel.

== Personal life ==
In 1921, McCarthy married Evelyn Marshall Porter.

McCarthy died on 16 September 1962 in Switzerland.
