= Coroner of the Queen's Household =

Former office in Royal Household of the UK

The Coroner of the King's/Queen's Household was an office of the Medical Household of the Royal Household of the Sovereign of the United Kingdom. It was abolished in 2013.

== History ==
=== The title ===
The office of Coroner of The King's or Queen's Household, reporting to the Lord Steward of the Household, dates back at least to the 13th century, and possibly even earlier, although not always given this exact name. As R. F. Hunnisett put it, "Another privileged area was peripatetic. This was the verge, which extended for twelve miles around the king's court. It had its own coroner, called the coroner of the king's household, coroner of the Marshalsea, or coroner of the verge ..."

There was a mention of the role in Law French by Bretton in 1290, "Et en noster hostel soit un Corouner, qi face le mester de la Coroune par mi la verge" (In our household let there be a Coroner to execute the business of the Crown throughout the verge) and a "William of Walden, coroner of the king's household" mentioned in 1333. A Robert of Hamond was described in 1480 as "coroner of the kynges houshold", and it is also recorded in legal Latin in 1593 as Coronatore hospicij dicte domine Regine, which Leslie Hotson translated as "Coroner of the household of our said lady the Queen" in his book on the death of the playwright Christopher Marlowe, inquired into by the Coroner of the Queen's Household, William Danby.

=== Shared responsibility ===
According to Hunnisett, "during the thirteenth century, no other coroner was allowed to act within the verge, with the result that many felonies were not presented to the justices in eyre after the king's court had moved on...", and Richard Clarke Sewell tells us that "Anciently the Coroner of the Verge had power to do all things within the Verge belonging to the office of the Coroner, to the exclusion of the Coroner of the County, but this clearly caused problems, which two acts were intended to solve."

Inquests within Verge, etc. Act 1300
- Act of Parliament
- Parliament of England
- Long title: None
- Citation: 28 Edw. 1. c. 3
- Territorial extent: England and Wales; Ireland

Dates
- Royal assent: 1300
- Commencement: 1300
- Repealed: England and Wales: Northern Ireland:
Other legislation
Amended by	Civil Procedure Acts Repeal Act 1879; Coroners Act 1887
Repealed by	England and Wales: Northern Ireland: Statute Law Revision Act 1950

Status: Repealed

Text of statute as originally enacted

These two acts were, first, in 1300, the Inquests within Verge, etc. Act 1300 (28 Edw. 1. c. 3) within the Articuli super Cartas (Articles upon the Charters), which said

"...it is ordained, that from henceforth in cases of the death of men, whereof the Coroner's Office is to make view and Enquest, it shall be commanded to the Coroner of the County, that he, with the Coroner of the (King's) House, shall do as belongeth to his office and inroll it."

Second, in 1311 there were Les noveles Ordenances (5 Edw. 2) (The New Ordinances), which said

"... We do ordain, that from henceforth in case of homicide, whereof the Coroner's office is to make view and Inquest, it shall be commanded to the Coroner of the Country or of the Franchises where the dead persons shall be found, that he, together with the Coroner of the Household do execute the office which thereunto pertaineth, and shall enter it in his Roll..."

Wellington described the result of the first statute thus:

"By this statute (the whole of which is repealed by Coroner's Act 1887), the Coroner of the county had to join with the Coroner of the Verge; but, without the assistance of the latter officer, the Coroner of the county could not act within the Verge. So neither could the Coroner of the Verge act in such cases, unless he be associated with the Coroner of the county; and this had to appear upon the inquisition, or otherwise it would be erroneous and void."

In other words, wherever an inquest needed to be held within the verge it was to be presided over by the two coroners jointly.

There was an exception to this, however, which was when an individual occupied both roles. Referring to a case in 1589, where one Richard Vale was both Coroner of the Queen's Household and one of the coroners for Middlesex, Sir Edward Coke reported that, despite Vale having presided alone where two coroners would have been expected, "it was resolved that the indictment was well taken, for the intent and meaning of the act was performed, and the mischief recited in the act avoided as well when one person is coroner of the houshold (sic), and of the county also, as if there should be two several persons."

One other act, in 1541/2, had also sought to clarify the relationship between the coroners of the county and the royal household. This was an "Act for Murder and Malicious Bloodshed within the Court" (33 Hen. 8. c. 12), concerning deaths within the precincts of the court itself. This stated "that all inquisitions upon the view of persons slain or hereafter to be slain within any of the King's said Palaces or houses or other house or houses aforesaid, shall be by authority of this Act had and taken hereafter for ever by the Coroner for the time being of the household of our Sovereign Lord the King or his heirs without any adjoining or assisting of another Coroner of any Shire within this Realm".

=== The Coroners Act 1887 ===
In 1756, The Coroner's Guide was saying that "if a Murder be committed within the Verge, and the King removes before an Inquisition taken by The Coroner of the King's Household, the Coroner of the County and the Coroner of the King's House shall inquire of the same." This seems to imply that the joint responsibility applied only when the court moved between the time of the death and the inquest. And it does appear that the shared responsibility occurred less and less over the years. In an essay written in 1812, the anonymous author even felt able to write "The duty of the coroner of the verge is, although I believe now wholly disregarded, in deaths happening within the verge, to sit, jointly with the coroner of the county to take the inquisitions ... I should apprehend, therefore, that all inquests as they are now, I believe, taken by the coroner of the county singly, when the question should be discussed, will be held to be bad."

Section 29 of the Coroners Act 1887 (50 & 51 Vict. c. 71) therefore removed this requirement—in fact doing away with the idea of the verge altogether—and leaving only those parts of the Henry VIII legislation mentioned above. Since then, their function was to investigate the death of anyone whose body was lying "within the limits of any of the Queen's palaces; or within the limits of any other house where Her Majesty is then residing."

=== Abolition ===
If the coroner empanelled a jury to investigate the death, all members of the jury had to be chosen from among the members of the royal household. This led to some controversy concerning the independence of the jury in the 2006 second inquest into the death of Diana, Princess of Wales. Section 46 of the Coroners and Justice Act 2009 abolished the office, effective 25 July 2013.

== List of the more recent Coroners of the King's/Queen's Household ==
- 2002–2013: Mr Michael J.C. Burgess
- c. 1987–2002: Dr John Burton
- c. 1984–1986: Lt Col. Dr G. McEwan
- 1959–1983: Dr A.G. Davies
- 1955–: Dr William Bentley Purchase
- 1934–1955: Lt Col Dr W. H. L. McCarthy
- 1901–1934: Arthur Walter Mills Esq.

== List of Deputy Coroners ==
- Mrs Selena Lynch, barrister 2007–2013
- Elizabeth Butler-Sloss, Baroness Butler-Sloss 2006–2007
- Mr Michael J.C. Burgess 1991–2002
- Lt Col. G.L.B. Thurston 1964–1980
- Derek Wheatley 1959–1964
