= Vergès =

Vergès is a French surname. It may refer to:

- Françoise Vergès (born 1952), French political scientist and historian
- Jacques Vergès (1925–2013), French anti-colonial activist and lawyer
- Paul Vergès (1925–2016), French (Reunionese) politician
- Raymond Vergès (1882–1957), French politician

== See also ==
- Verges (disambiguation)
