= Cuarteto d'Aida =

Cuban musical group

The Cuarteto d'Aida was a famous Cuban close-harmony female singing group. It was directed by the pianist Aida Diestro (1924–1973) in 1952. Three brilliant young singers - Elena Burke, Omara Portuondo and her sister Haydee Portuondo - came to Diestro with the idea of the quartet, which originally would include one male singer. Thinking that the quartet would sound better, Diestro replaced the proposed male singer with another woman, Moraima Secada. Of this original group, only one, Omara is still alive and performing today. Her career kind of languishing, Omara was brought back to popularity thanks to the fact that she made part of the Buena Vista Club phenomenon, a group integrated by old musicians forgotten by the public and the music-industry-controlling government.

The Cuarteto d'Aida was part of a post World War II blend of jazz and Cuban bolero movement in Cuba known as "feeling" or "filin", which renovated the traditional harmonies and lyrics of the music on the island. The quartet could basically sing any type of song, from standards like Maxwell's "Ebb Tide" to a guaracha and a rhumba, though the bolero was central to their style. The group was heard on the radio, had many TV presentations, as well as in all the major and all the important cabarets of Havana and abroad. They also toured many countries both before and after the Cuban revolution of 1959. Amazingly, the original group recorded only one LP, Recordings after 1960 included just one of the original singers, Omara, who left the quartet in 1967. Elena Burke was the first to become a soloist, followed a couple of years later by Moraima Secada. Omara's sister, Haydee, stayed in the United States after the quartet finished a gig in the Fontainebleau Hotel in Miami.

Throughout the years, when any of the singers left the group or were otherwise unavailable substitutes were found, many of them also very talented. Teresa "Tete" García Caturla joined them in 1963, and led them after Aida's death in 1973. Leonora Rega, Marisela Ramirez, Georgina Sánchez, Rosa Sánchez, Magaly Linares, Lilita Penalver, Niurka Galarraga, and Betty Tamayo are others who have sung with the group.
