= William E. Verge =

United States Navy officer (1901–1973)

William Ernest Verge
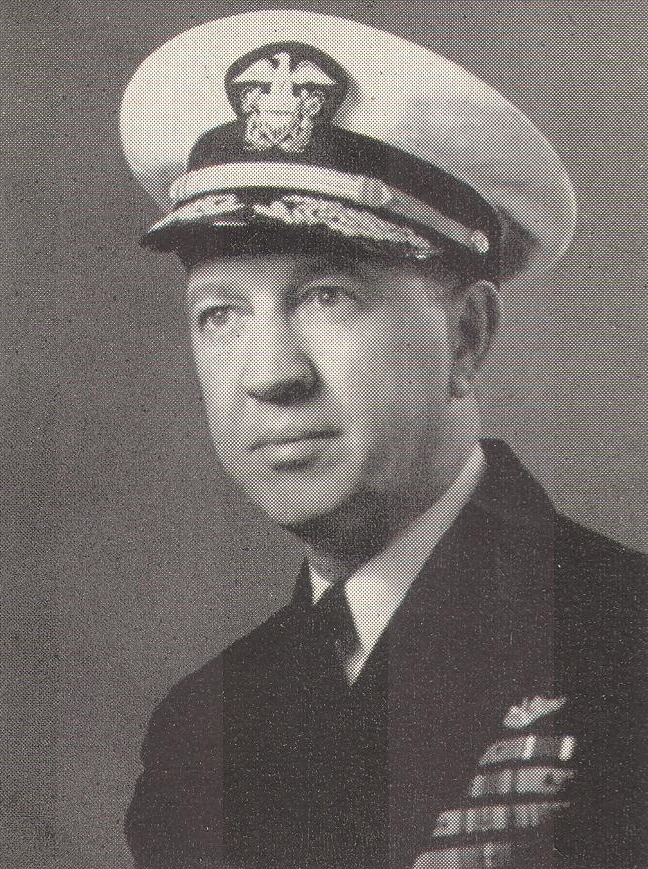
- Born: 31 January 1901; Everett, Massachusetts
- Died: 10 August 1973 (aged 72); Annapolis, Maryland
- Burial place: United States Naval Academy Cemetery
- Military career
- Allegiance: United States
- Branch: United States Navy
- Service years: 1924–1946
- Rank: Rear Admiral
- Commands: Branch Hydrographics Office Baltimore; USS Haraden (DD-183); USS Herbert (DD-160); LSM Flotilla 7
- Conflicts: World War II Philippines Campaign (1944–1945) Invasion of Lingayen Gulf Invasion of Palawan Invasion of Panay Invasion of Negros Borneo campaign (1945) in command of the invasion of Weston, Borneo
- Awards: Bronze Star Medal with Valor device (2); Navy Commendation Medal; Nicaraguan Campaign Medal; Yangtze Service Medal; American Defense Service Medal with A Device; Asiatic-Pacific Campaign Medal with 3Service stars; European-African-Middle Eastern Campaign Medal; American Campaign Medal; Philippine Liberation Medal; Navy Occupation Service Medal; World War II Victory Medal

William Ernest Verge (January 31, 1901 – August 10, 1973) was an officer in the United States Navy. He commanded the Amphibious Flotilla 7 forces that invaded the Philippine islands during World War II, and later was one of the officers responsible for the mooring and arrangement of the target ships at Bikini Atoll.

== Early life ==
William Ernest Verge, was born on January 31, 1901, in Everett, Massachusetts, son of William Ainsley Verge and Mary Frances "Molly" Fenessy. He was appointed to the United States Naval Academy by John F. Fitzgerald, who served as Representative for the state of Massachusetts, on June 11, 1920, after he graduated from the Leonard Preparatory School in New York. While at the academy, Verge participated in boxing, football, baseball and handball. He was also a member of the academy glee club, and reached the rank of Company Commander. He graduated in 1924 as an Ensign.

== Personal life ==
He married Martha Ann Bready in 1930 and had 3 children, Martha Ann Caroline (October 10, 1934 – August 8, 2017), William Granville Verge (born May 21, 1937), and George Sinclair (October 17, 1942 – April 13, 2007). He also had an adopted son John Robert (October 21, 1928 – September 2, 2007).

== 1924–1941 ==
As an Ensign, Verge was assigned to his first ship, the USS Utah (BB-31), as the Communications officer in June 1924 upon graduation, being selected as one of the Spanish interpreters for General Pershing on his South American Good Will Tour. Upon their return to New York, he was transferred to the USS Bainbridge (DD-246) as the Torpedo and Gunnery Officer, and then to the USS Stewart (DD-224) as her Torpedo and Gunnery Officer for three months until his reassignment to the USS S-32 (SS-137), again serving as the ship's Torpedo and Gunnery Officer, but also taking on the role of Communications Officer. While serving in the S-32, Verge applied for a flight physical in order to become a Naval Aviator, but failed due to lack of 20/20 vision. He remained on the S-32 until his promotion to Lieutenant Junior Grade (LTJG) in 1930.

After his promotion to LTJG, he was ordered to the USS O-9 (SS-70) as the submarine's Executive Officer until her decommissioning on June 25, 1931. His next assignment was at the United States Naval Academy, where he was an English and History instructor. While there, he received a Letter of Commendation from the Commandant of the academy for the many hours he volunteered to the academy's athletic department as a football and boxing coach. After his tour of duty at the academy, he was assigned to the USS Saratoga (CV-3) as the carrier's boiler division officer, ship's secretary to the Captain, and other duties. While serving on Saratoga, he was promoted to the rank of lieutenant on March 13, 1934. He received a Letter of Commendation later that year from Commander Aircraft Battle Forces Atlantic Fleet for navigating the Saratoga through the Straits of Florida at high speeds in heavy weather and darkened ship conditions during Fleet exercises. He remained on Saratoga for another 2 years until he was ordered to the Hydrographers Office in Baltimore, Maryland, on April 8, 1936, as the Commanding Officer of that office. He served as Commanding Officer there until March 5, 1938, when he was sent to the USS Mississippi (BB-41), where he served as the ships 1st Lieutenant and damage control officer.

On September 19, 1939, Verge was ordered to the Puget Sound Navy Yard in Washington to help outfit and recommission the USS Patoka (AO-9) and return her to the Norfolk Navy Yard in Norfolk, Virginia, for further outfitting and return to service as AV-6. After returning the Patoka to service, Verge was promoted to Lieutenant Commander (LCDR) on August 21, 1940.

On September 10, 1940, Verge was ordered to take command of the old "four stacker" destroyer USS Haraden (DD-183), sail her to Nova Scotia, and transfer her to British service as part of the "lend/lease" program. This took approximately 4 months. After the transfer of the Haraden, Verge was ordered to take command of another old "four stacker", the USS Herbert (DD-160). This ship, however, remained in U.S. service. Verge only held command of Herbert for 9 months in 1941 until he was ordered by Admiral Chester Nimitz, who was now the Chief of Bureau of Navigation, to assume the position of Ship's Supervisor (SHIPSUP) of the USS Arkansas (BB-33), dry-docking on May 19, 1941. While there, he was responsible for making sure the ship was ready to return to sea – no easy task due to her age. He was also responsible for restoring the watertight integrity of the ship, and the rehabilitation of the ship's berthing areas. When Arkansas's re-fit was complete, Verge remained on board as the First Lieutenant and Damage Control Officer. While serving in that capacity, he was in attendance at the signing of the Atlantic Charter in August 1941.

== World War II ==
When the refit of the Arkansas was completed in 1944, LCDR Verge was promoted to CDR and returned to the Amphibious Training Command in Little creek, Virginia, where he was immediately ordered to outfit, commission and command LSM Flotilla 7 for duty in the South Pacific. While in command of Flotilla 7 (later to be known as "Verge's Fast Freighters"), Cdr Verge while under the command of Commander 7th Amphibious Forces involved in the following invasions

- Invasion of Lingayen Gulf on 9 January 1945 while assigned to CTU 79.5.4
- Invasion of Nasugbu on 31 January 1945 while assigned to CTU 78.2.4
- Invasion of Palawan from 28 February to 22 April 1945 also assigned to CTU 78.2.4
- Invasion of Panay on 18 March 1945 while assigned to 78.3.3
- Battle of the Negros IslandsAs a part of the Admiralty Islands campaign 29 March while assigned to CTU 78.3.31
- Invasion of Labuan, Borneo 10 June 1945 while assigned to CTU 78.1.14
- Commanded the Invasion of Weston, Borneo on 17 June 1945
- invasion of Lutong, Borneo on 20 June 1945 while assigned to CTU 76.20.51

Once the Philippine Islands were declared liberated, (now Captain) Verge and his flotilla were placed under the Command of Amphibious Group 9 from 4 July 1945 till the end of the war, with the task of regrouping elements of the Southwest Pacific Army Forces in the Philippines. With the surrender of the Japanese on 15 Sept 1945, Capt Verge and his flotilla moved from being a liberation force to being an occupational force. Finally on 8 January 1946, Capt Verge was ordered to take his flotilla back to the mainland United States and deactivate, thus bringing his involvement in World War II to a close.

== Post-war ==
After the deactivation of LSM Flotilla 7, Capt Verge was once again assigned to the USS Arkansas (BB-33), this time as a part of Task group 1.2, the target vessel group of Operation Crossroads and was responsible for

- Preparing and placing target vessels for tests
- Salvaging and providing rescue assistance to damaged, strained, or distressed vessels
- Evacuating ships at time of tests
- Furnishing boats and boat crews to the boat patrol
- Providing boats from target vessels for radsafe reconnaissance and transport of initial inspection parties after both the "able" and "baker" tests.

After the "Baker test" on 25 July 1945 Captain Verge was ordered to the Bureau of Ships and given the responsibility of laying up all the excess ships used during the war, starting with the ships used at Bikini. He was one of the officers responsible for establishing the Reserve fleet and stationing unneeded ships in a manner that in a time of need they could be brought back in service, (many of the locations they chose to moor these ships are still in use for today's reserve fleet)

Rear Admiral Verge retired from naval service in Dec 1947 and became the Dean of Residence and Professor of Military Science and tactics at McDonogh School in Baltimore, Maryland.

After leaving the McDonogh School in 1952 he went on to be the Vice President of The Industrial Corporation of Baltimore until 1955, When he left there to become the Assistant Superintendent and Administrator of the South Florida State Hospital in Hollywood, Florida until his retirement in 1966.

Upon his retirement for the state hospital in 1966, Verge returned to Annapolis, Maryland where he lived until he died in 1973. He was buried in the United States Naval Academy Cemetery with full Military Honors.

== Photos ==
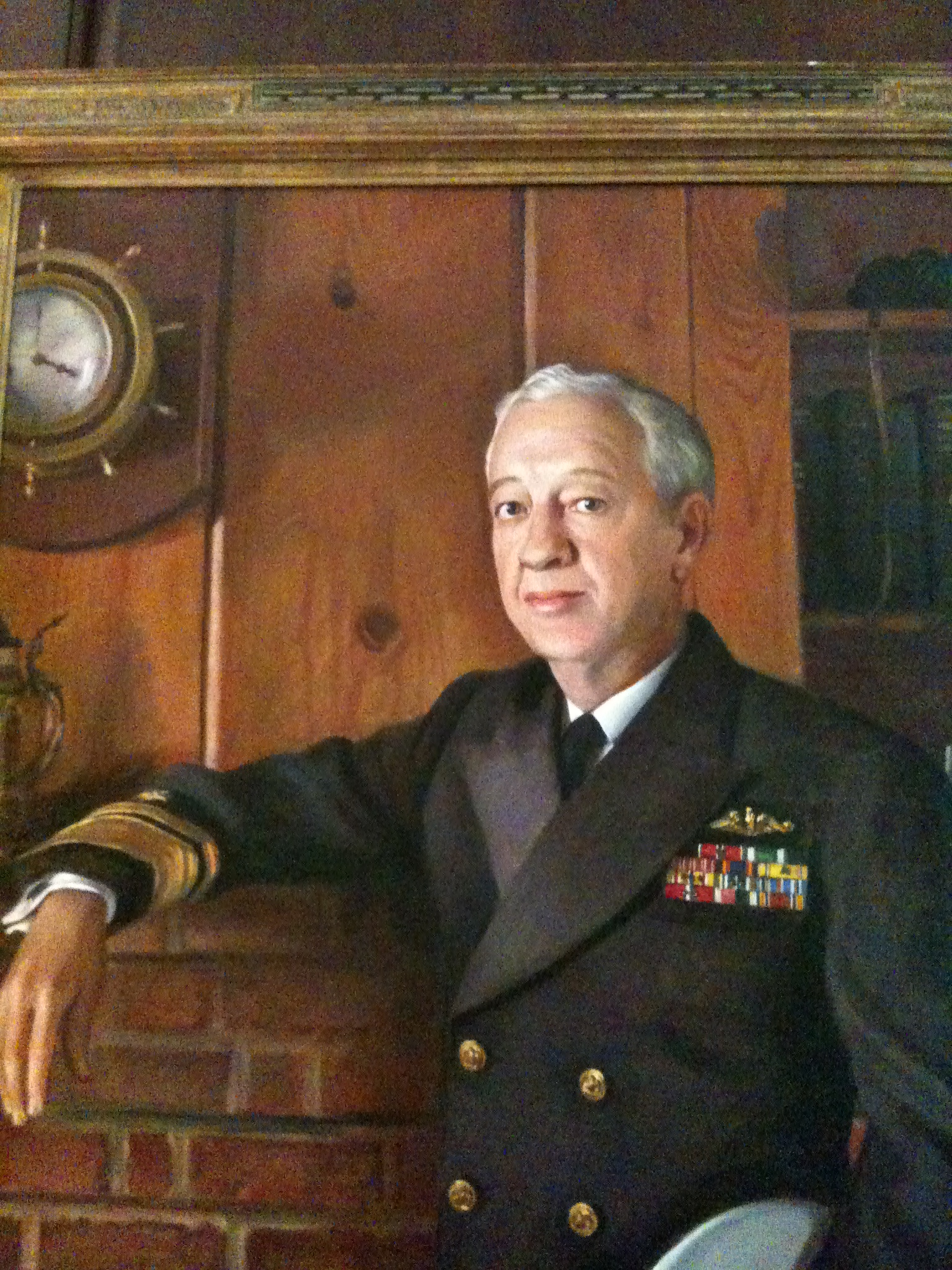
Painting of Rear Adm William Ernest verge

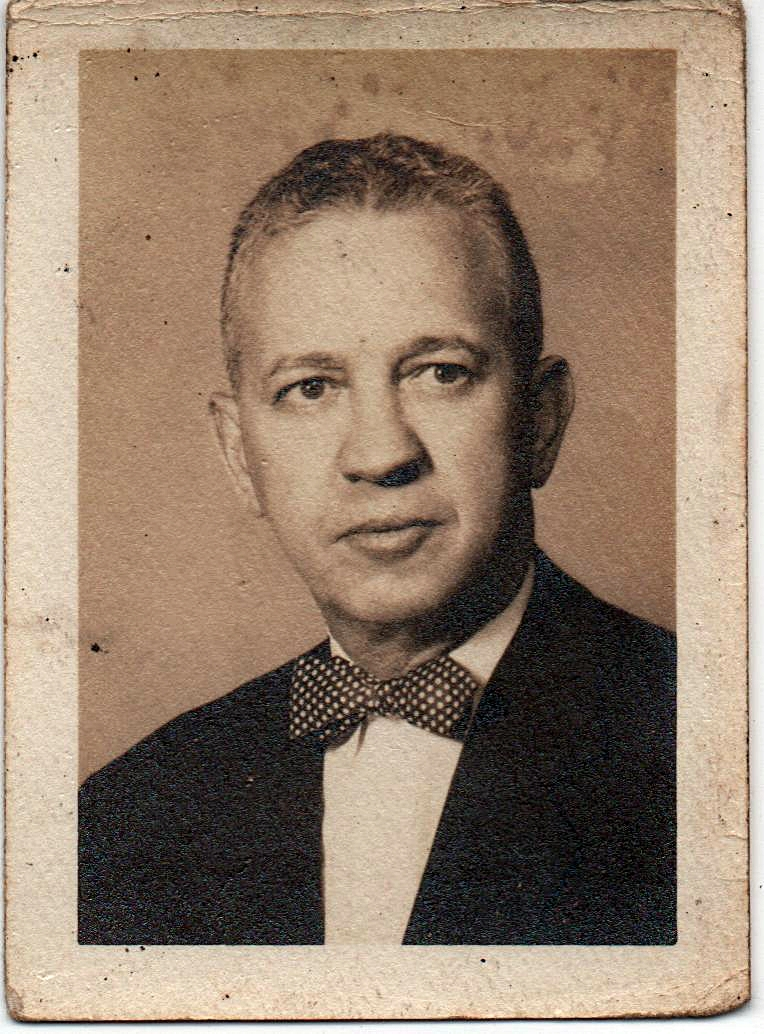
Photo of William Verge

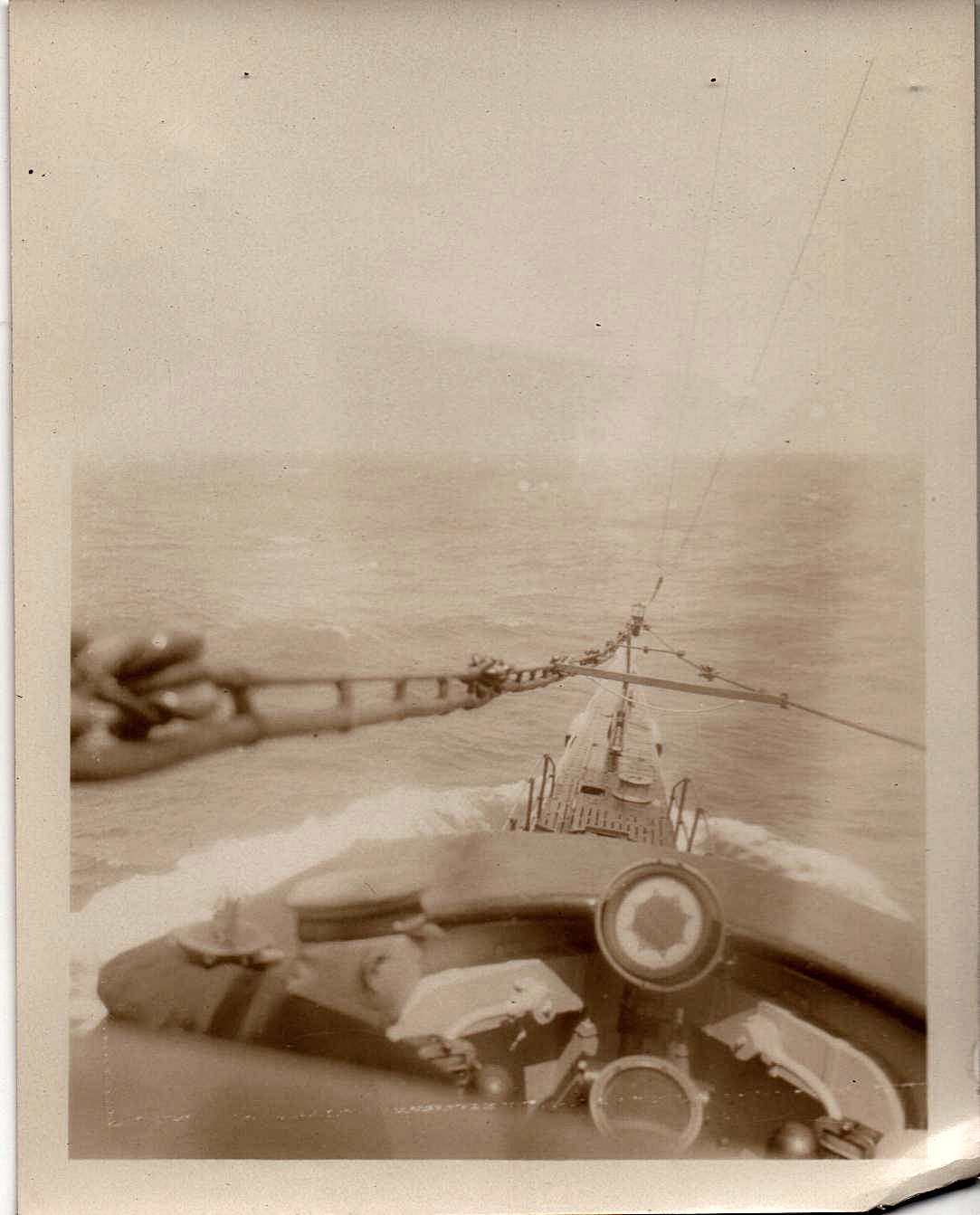
Bridge of the O-9

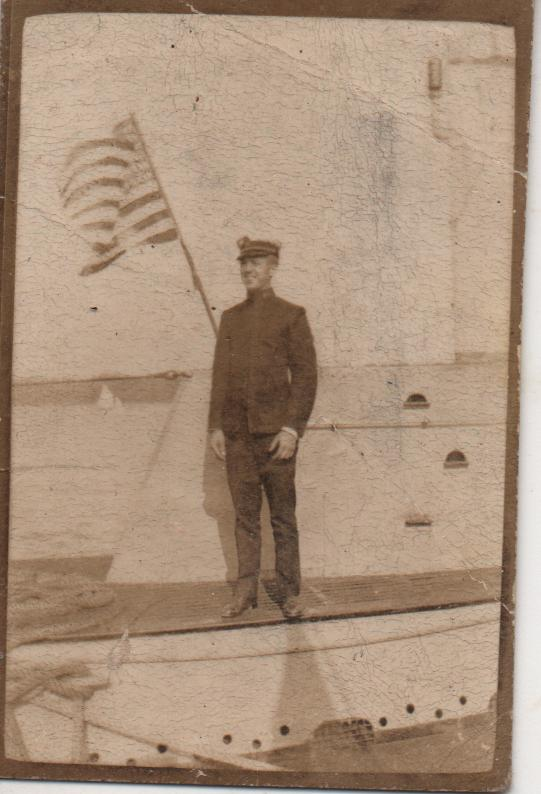
Verge aboard the S-32

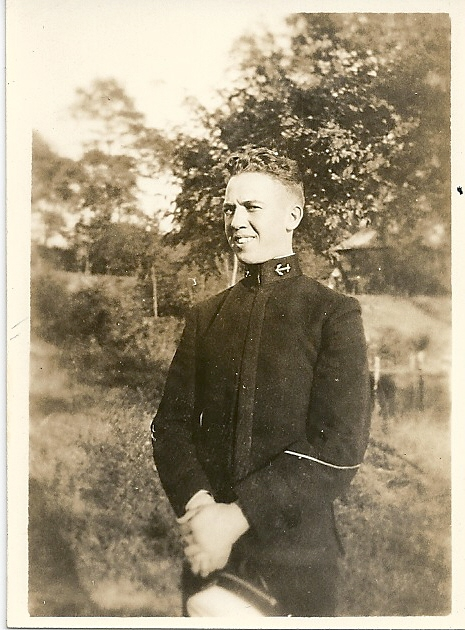
Photo 2 of William Verge at the Naval Academy

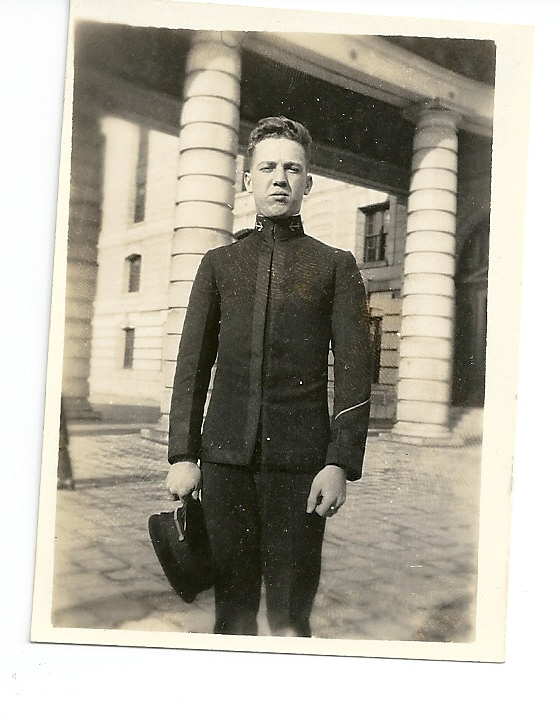
Photo of William Verge at the Naval Academy

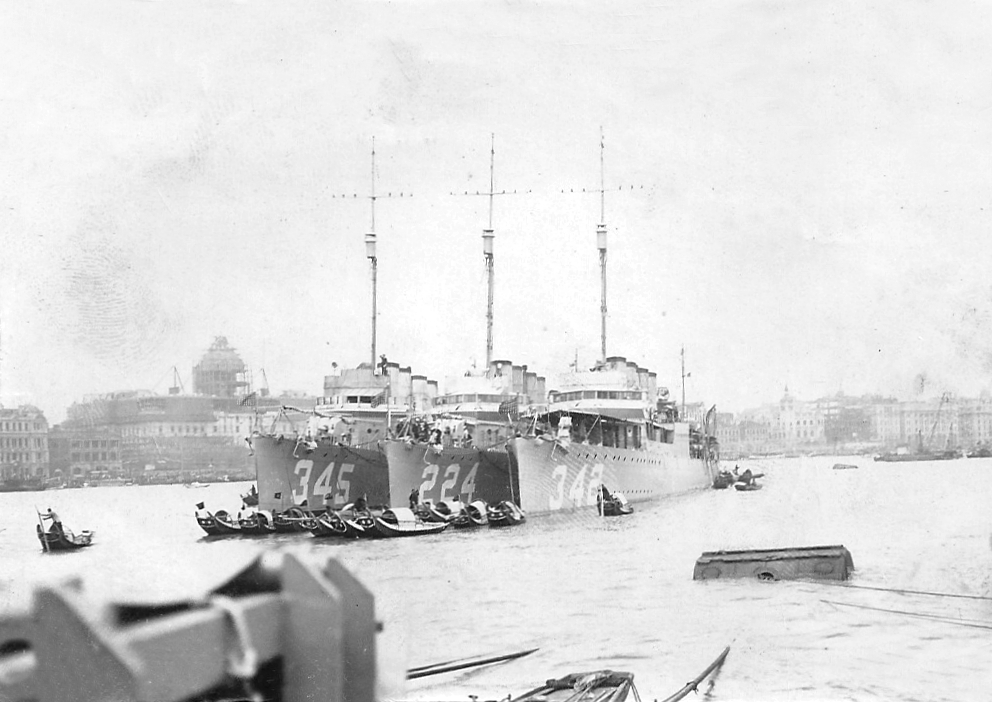
USS STEWERT in Shanghai, China, circa 1927

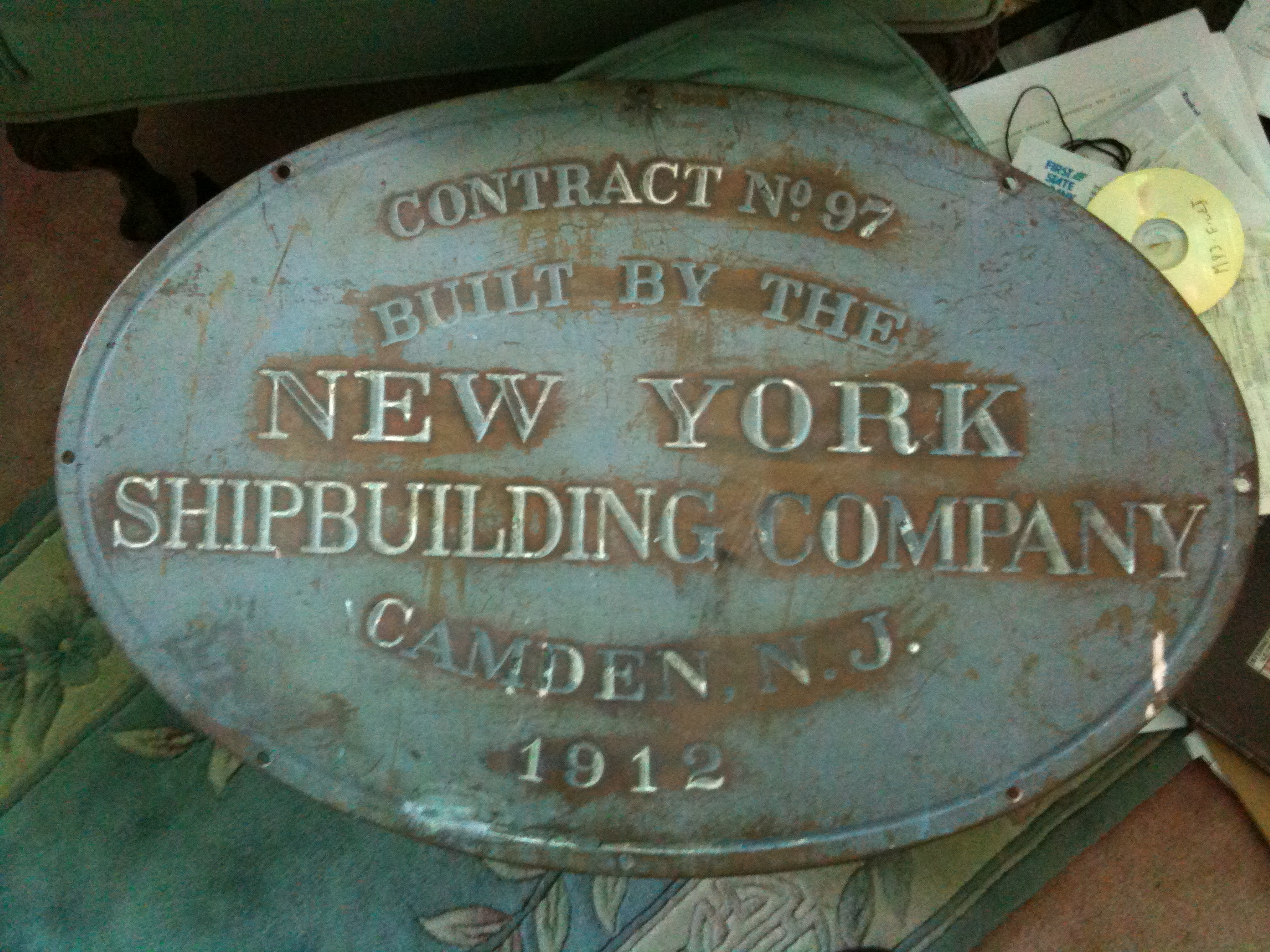
Builder's plate from the USS ARKANSAS

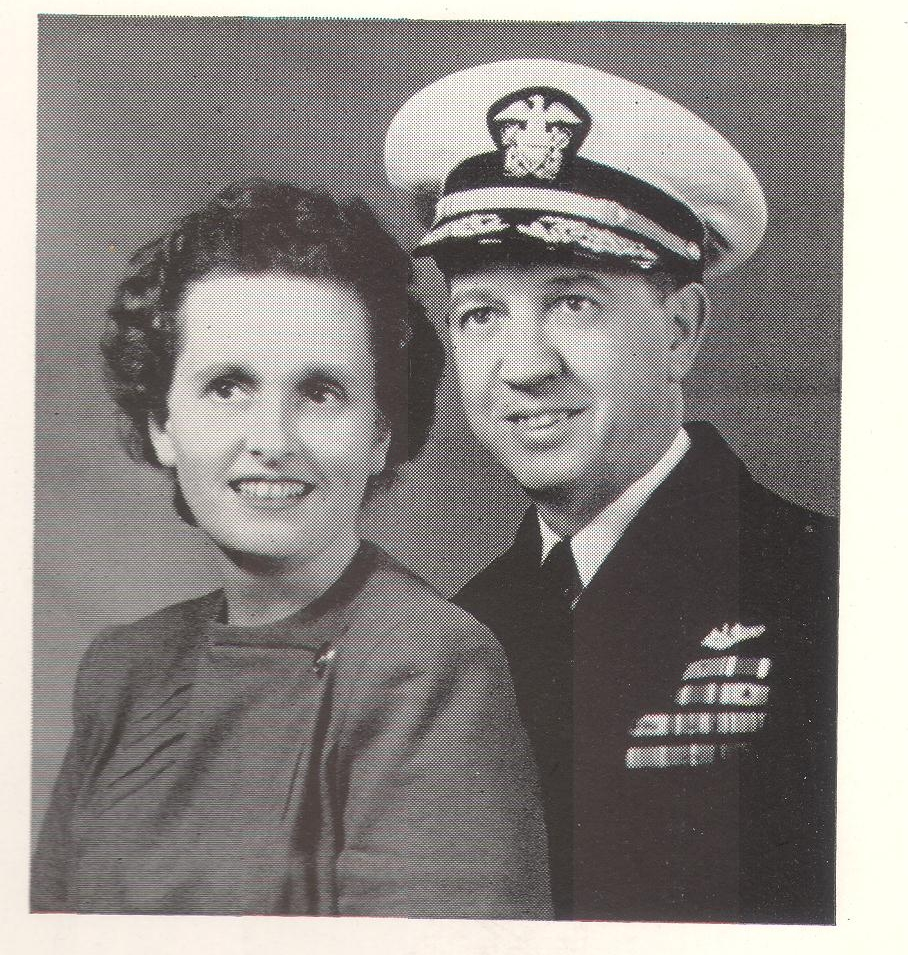
Adm verge and wife Martha
