= Verge (royal court) =

Jurisdiction around the medieval English court

The verge was an area of 12-mile (19 km) radius around the court of the monarch of England, and later Britain, that was subject to special legal jurisdiction in some aspects. A Court of the Verge heard legal cases arising from within the verge or pertaining to members of the Royal Household. The Coroner of the Household held jurisdiction for the investigation of deaths within the verge. The Clerk of the Market held powers over markets held within the verge. The Board of Green Cloth originally issued arrest warrants within the verge but later developed a role as a licensing authority.

== Description ==
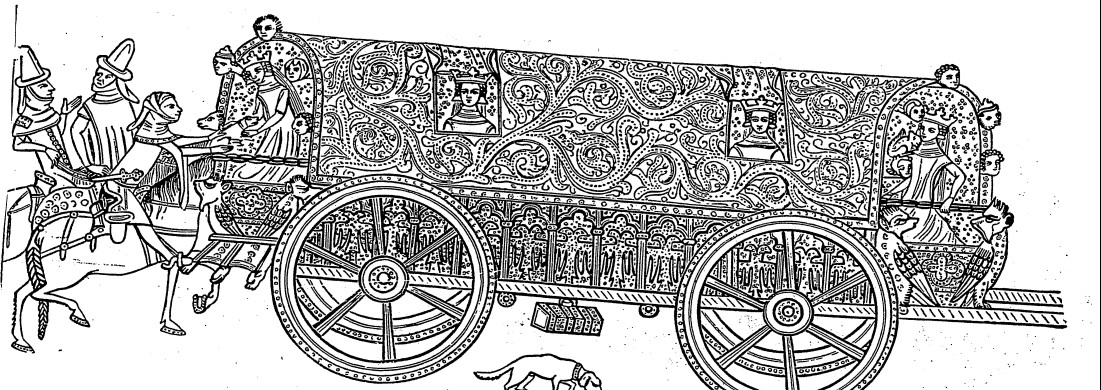
A carriage of the 14th-century English itinerant royal court

In medieval times, the English royal court was itinerant, frequently moving via royal progresses around the realm. The Knight Marshal, a senior member of the Royal Household, accompanied the monarch on his or her travels. The Knight Marshal carried a wand of office, known as the wand of peace or the verge wand, which signified royal justice. An area known as the verge, located within a circle of 12 miles (19 km) around the wand became subject to special legal jurisdiction. Some sources discussing this era state that the 12 miles (19 km) measurement was a circumference (or a "perimeter" or measured "round" the wand), which would give a circle of 1.91 miles (3.07 km) radius. Other sources state the distance was measured as a radius extending from the wand and this was the definition applied for the jurisdiction of the verge after the court was considered to have settled at London permanently.

The term "verge" was also used to describe the court as a whole with individuals within it described as "vergours". It is derived from the definition of verge as a "circle or rim", as in the bounds of the jurisdiction.

== Special jurisdictions ==
=== Court of the Verge ===
English subjects could request a hearing from the royal court for any offences committed within the verge. To hear these legal cases, a Court of the Verge was typically called by the Lord Steward, another senior member of the Royal Household. As well as offences committed within the verge the court had jurisdiction over any cases involving members of the Royal Household. The Knight Marshal had a role in the court, taking custody of any prisoners. The court was assisted by a Clerk of the Verge.

Unusually, in 1290 Edward I fined himself for a breach of the peace after striking one of his squires on the head with a rod during the wedding festivities for his daughter Margaret. After the royal court became fixed at London, the Court of the Verge developed into the Marshalsea Court, of fixed address in Southwark.

=== Coroner of the Household ===
The Coroner of the Household held jurisdiction over deaths in the verge. By law county coroners were not permitted to carry out enquiries into deaths within the verge. In practice the Coroner of the Household often worked with the country coroner to investigate deaths. After the royal court more or less became fixed at Westminster in the late sixteenth century the person appointed as Coroner of the Household was also often the coroner of Middlesex, the county within which the court resided, resolving most questions of jurisdiction.

=== Clerk of the Market ===
The Clerk of the Market originally superintended the markets held at the gates of the residence then occupied by the king, for the purposes of supplying the Royal Household. From 1290 the clerk was authorised to travel the verge to visit other markets as the court travelled. The law required that, in the markets he visited, the clerk's preferred weights and measures were to be enforced. The clerk had the power to levy fines or to prevent a non-compliant market from meeting.

The clerk earned a significant income from fines and bribes. By the early 17th century the clerk's jurisdiction had been extended beyond the verge but it was restricted to it again by an act of parliament of 1641.

=== Board of Green Cloth ===
The Board of Green Cloth was originally responsible for issuing arrest warrants within the verge. Into the 21st century the Board retained a role in granting liquor, betting and gaming licences in premises under the control of the royal palaces, until its abolition by the Licensing Act 2004.
