= On the Verge (radio) =

On The Verge is a Dublin based live music radio show and series of live concerts. The show is hosted by Brendan Hickey who also presents the live concerts.

== Information ==
The show was broadcast live 1996-2010 every Thursday at 8 pm for an hour on (D.S.F.M. 93.9FM) which can be heard within a radius of five miles from Dundrum, Dublin.

Brendan Hickey went to Pearse College in Crumlin, Dublin, as a mature student in media production and soon found that radio had become his favourite medium.

One of his early projects had been a documentary on Dave Murphy's "Singer / Songwriter Night" which took place, every Tuesday night, in Wicklow Street's International Bar. He encouraged Brendan to start giving performances of his poetry and honoured him with "resident poet" status. Brendan found these talented young musicians to be inspirational and formed a production team with the intention of recording as many of these aspiring musicians as possible.

Brendan joined Dublin South Community Radio (now D.S.F.M.) in 1996 and convinced the station to find a slot for On the Verge, a programme, which concentrates on unearthing local talent and helping them up those first few steps in the business. The show is now over thirteen years on air.

The 'On The Verge'(oTv) team has also been responsible for staging regular music nights to showcase these artists and for over fifteen years oTv has presented FREE gigs in a variety of venues around the city.

Brendan has also been giving performances of his poetry for over 30 years. He currently does an internet only bilingual radio show "Sráidbhaile" which is downloadable from www.ontheverge.ie and which features music and interviews with On The Verge performers. Brendan has also released two albums, both produced by the renowned, Karl Odlum. "Vergions" and "Melting into Oneness"; collections of poetry, which have had music composed for them by at over a dozen musicians.

== Previous acts ==
On The Verge can boast some of the finest Irish bands and artists to grace their stage and/or radio airwaves. These include

- Damien Dempsey
- Paddy Casey
- Mundy
- Jerry Fish
- Damien Rice
- Declan O'Rourke
- Mic Christopher
- Rob Smith
- The Frames
- Lisa Hannigan
- Gemma Hayes
- Glen Hansard
- Rodrigo Y Gabriela

and many more...
