= Dominica Verges =

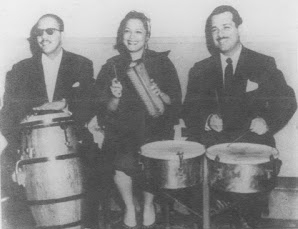
- Verges with Aberlardo Valdés (left) and Fernando Albuerne (right) in the mid-1950s

Background information
- Born: Dominica Verges González; September 19, 1918; Tapaste, San José de las Lajas, Cuba
- Died: January 12, 2002 (aged 83) Havana, Cuba
- Genres: Danzón, son, chachachá, bolero
- Occupation: Musician
- Instruments: Vocals, claves
- Years active: 1930s–1982
- Labels: Columbia, RCA Victor
- Formerly of: Anacaona, Oquesta Ilusión, Orquesta Siglo XX, Orquesta Almendra, Trovadores Cubanos, Charanga Típica Cubana

Dominica Verges González (September 19, 1918 – January 12, 2002) was a Cuban singer, famous for her interpretation of danzones. She started her career at a very young age singing in her family's son septet, which she left to settle in Havana in 1935. There she performed with several female orchestras such as Anacaona and Orquesta Ilusión, before joining Alfaro Pérez's Orquesta Siglo XX in 1938. With the Siglo XX Verges became a popular danzón singer, making several recordings in the 1940s. She also sang with Justa García's quartet, Orquesta Almendra and the Charanga Típica Cubana, among other groups, before retiring in 1982.

== Life and career ==
Dominica Verges González was born on September 19, 1918, in the village of Tapaste, in the municipality of San José de las Lajas, near Havana. Her grandfather was a violinist from the Philippines, and many of her relatives were also musicians, which led to her being interested in music from a very young age. She gained experience as a singer by joining her uncles' and grandfathers' son group, founded in 1929 as the Sexteto Cubano. She then started to travel daily to Havana to play with the orchestras at the Paseo del Prado, before relocating to the city in 1935.

In Havana, Verges became a member of various female groups such as Concepción Castro's Anacaona, Alicia Seoane's Orquesta Ilusión, and Orquesta Imperio, among others. The year 1938 saw the formation of the charanga Orquesta Siglo XX, directed by bassist Alfaro Pérez, who chose Verges as the singer for the group. With the Siglo XX Verges recorded several songs in 1940 and 1941, and became famous as vocalist, being nicknamed "La Danzonera" due to the popularity of her sung danzones. After Paulina Álvarez, "The Empress of the Danzonete", Verges became the second most popular singer in the genre. In 1941, she recorded two tracks in New York credited to Orquesta Dominica Verges: Osvaldo Farrés's bolero "Acércate más" and Rafael Hernández's danzón "Rebeca".

While a member of the Siglo XX, Verges also performed with Justa García's trova quartet as lead singer, as well as Orquesta Modelo, making one recording in 1941. In the 1950s she sang for groups such as José Fajardo's orchestra, Hermanas Almanza, Mariano Mercerón's orchestra and Orquesta Almendra. The latter featured flautist Miguel O'Farrill and cemented Verges's popularity in Cuba and abroad, touring the Dominican Republic, Haiti and Panama. With the all-female Orquesta Imperio she had toured the East Coast of the United States and the Dominican Republic. In 1960, she joined Trovadores Cubanos, a trova quartet founded by Odilio Urfé. With Trovadores Cubanos, Dominica recorded and performed live on Sindo Garay's 100th birthday.

Having retired in 1982, Dominica Verges died in Havana on January 12, 2002. That year, Cuban filmmaker Armando Linares made a documentary about her, Rompiendo la rutina.

== See also ==
- Paulina Álvarez
