= Marshalsea Court =

English court

Court of Marshalsea Act 1389
- Act of Parliament
- Parliament of England
- Long title: None
- Citation: 13 Ric. 2. Stat. 1. c. 3
- Territorial extent: England and Wales; Ireland

Dates
- Royal assent: 1390
- Commencement: 17 January 1390 (Note: StartOfSession)
- Repealed: England and Wales: 28 July 1863; Ireland: 10 August 1872

Other legislation
- Repealed by: England and Wales: Statute Law Revision Act 1863; Ireland: Statute Law (Ireland) Revision Act 1872
- Relates to: Marshalsea Court Act 1400; County Courts Act 1849

Status: Repealed

Text of statute as originally enacted

The Marshalsea Court (or Court of the Marshalsea, also known as the Court of the Verge or the Court of the Marshal and Steward) was a court associated with the Royal Household in England. Associated with, but distinct from, the Marshalsea Court was the Palace Court, which came into being in the 17th century.

Both courts had jurisdiction within a geographical area known as the Verge of the court, which was fixed by the Court of Marshalsea Act 1389 (13 Ric. 2. Stat. 1. c. 3).

The Marshalsea and Palace Courts were both abolished on 31 December 1849 by the County Courts Act 1849 (12 & 13 Vict. c. 101).

== The Marshalsea Court ==
The Marshalsea of the King's House was a court of record held by the Steward and Marshal of the Royal Household, to administer justice between the sovereign's domestic servants "that they might not be drawn into other courts and their service lost". It was considered to be one of the most ancient courts of the realm; it sat by prescriptive right and was adjudged to be coeval with the common law of the land. In the middle ages the court was held in the hall of the King's palace, and 'followed the person of the King wherever he should go'.

Originally the jurisdiction of the court was general and extensive: 'it comprehended all actions, real, personal and mixed, and all pleas of the crown within the verge'. In 1300, however, a statute was passed limiting the court's jurisdiction. Subsequently it dealt with cases of trespass committed within the verge, if one party was in the sovereign's service; and with debts, contracts and covenants, where both parties belonged to the royal household, in which case the inquest was composed of men from the royal household only. Over time the criminal jurisdiction of the court fell into disuse (being superseded by commissions of oyer and terminer and gaol delivery which were known as commissions of the verge), though it continued to exercise civil jurisdiction.

Associated with the court was the Marshalsea Prison. Originally the prison of the Court of the Marshalsea and known from about 1300, it was on a site in Mermaid Court, Southwark until relocated to an adjacent site off Borough High Street in 1811. Here it largely functioned as a debtor's prison until 1842 when its role was taken over by the Queen's Bench Prison. Up until 1801, the meeting place of the Court was co-located with the prison; in 1373 Edward III had issued instructions for the Marshalsea court and prison to be rebuilt 'in our royal street' (i.e. King Street) in Southwark. Later the same courtroom was used by the Palace Court.

== The Palace Court ==
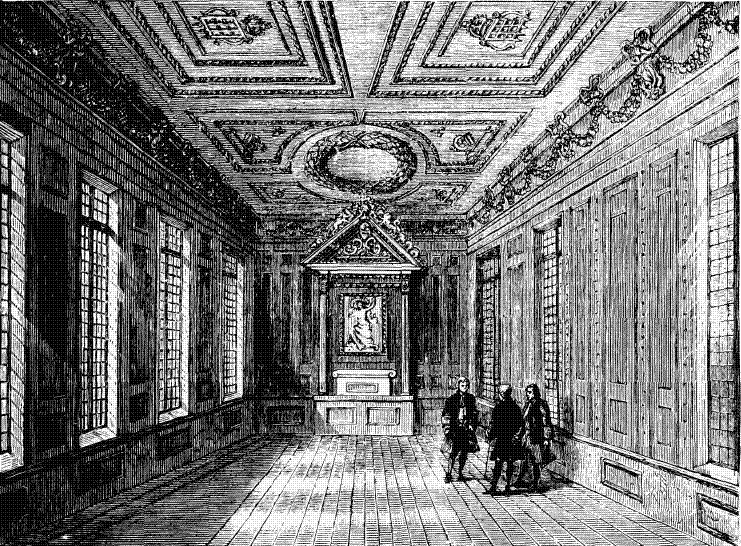
Interior of the Palace Court of the Marshalsea, 1790.

In 1630 Charles I created by letters patent (renewed by Charles II in 1665) a new court, the Court of the Palace of the King at Westminster, to be held by the Steward of the Household and Knight Marshal, and the steward of the court or his deputy, and having jurisdiction to hear all kinds of personal actions between parties within twelve miles of Whitehall Palace (the jurisdiction of the Marshalsea court, the City of London, and Westminster Hall being excepted). It differed from the Marshalsea court in that it had no jurisdiction over the sovereign's household, nor were its suitors necessarily of the household. The privilege of practising before the palace court was limited to four counsel.

In some cases, the counsel practising before both the Marshalsea Court and the Palace Court overlapped, as was the case with the Lincoln's Inn barrister Levett Blackborne, grandson of Sir Richard Levett, former Lord Mayor of London. Blackborne served as steward of both courts, as did several other barristers.

== Later history ==
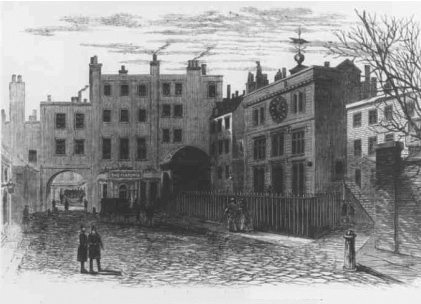
The new court house (right, with clock) in Great Scotland Yard.

Latterly the Palace Court was held weekly together with the ancient Court of Marshalsea (allegedly 'for many years no legal business was transacted in the Marshalsea Court, though it continued to be opened and closed with the same legal formalities as the Palace Court, the judges and other officers being the same in both').

By the end of the 18th century the court building in Southwark had become very dilapidated, and in 1801 the courts moved into new purpose-built premises in Great Scotland Yard. The Court Office, however, was to be found in Clifford's Inn; (as noted by Hatton in his New View of London, 'none except members of Clifford's Inn may practise [as attorneys] in this court').

The Marshalsea Court and Palace Court were both abolished in 1849, whereupon the building in Scotland Yard was transferred to the Metropolitan Police (whose headquarters were opposite), and it served as a police station until 1891 (when the police relocated to New Scotland Yard); the old court building subsequently housed the offices of the Chief Inspector of Reformatories and Industrial Schools, until it was demolished as part of a comprehensive rebuilding of the area in 1909.

== Officers of the court ==
In the 1820s the officers of the court were listed as:

- The Lord Steward
- The Knight Marshal
- The Steward of the Court (and his deputy)
- The Prothonotary (and his deputy)

along with four Counsel (two from the Temple, two from Lincoln's Inn) and six Attornies (all of Clifford's Inn).

In addition the King's Marshalmen served as tipstaffs to the court.
