= Moraima Secada =

- Born: September 10, 1930; Santa Clara, Cuba
- Died: December 30, 1984 (aged 54); Havana, Cuba

Moraima Secada (born María Micaela Secada Ramos (10 September 1930 – 30 December 1984), known to her admirers as La Mora (the moor), was a temperamental singer who created a special style of interpretation within the Cuban music genre of filin (feeling).

She started her career in the 1950s and was a member of the first female orchestra of America Anacaona, which made many international tours. She was also in the vocal groups Cuarteto Los Meme and Cuarteto D'Aida. She died of liver disease in Havana. She was the aunt of the singer Jon Secada.
