= Music of Cuba =

The music of Cuba, including its instruments, performance, and dance, comprises a large set of unique traditions influenced mostly by west African and European (especially Spanish) music. Due to the syncretic nature of most of its genres, Cuban music is often considered one of the richest and most influential regional music in the world. For instance, the son cubano merges an adapted Spanish guitar (tres), melody, harmony, and lyrical traditions with Afro-Cuban percussion and rhythms. Almost nothing remains of the original native traditions, since the native population was exterminated in the 16th century.

Since the 19th century, Cuban music has been hugely popular and influential throughout the world. It has been perhaps the most popular form of regional music since the introduction of recording technology. Cuban music has contributed to the development of a wide variety of genres and musical styles around the globe, most notably in Latin America, the Caribbean, West Africa, and Europe. Examples include rhumba, Afro-Cuban jazz, salsa, soukous, many West African re-adaptations of Afro-Cuban music (Orchestra Baobab, Africando), Spanish fusion genres (notably with flamenco), and a wide variety of genres in Latin America.

== Overview ==
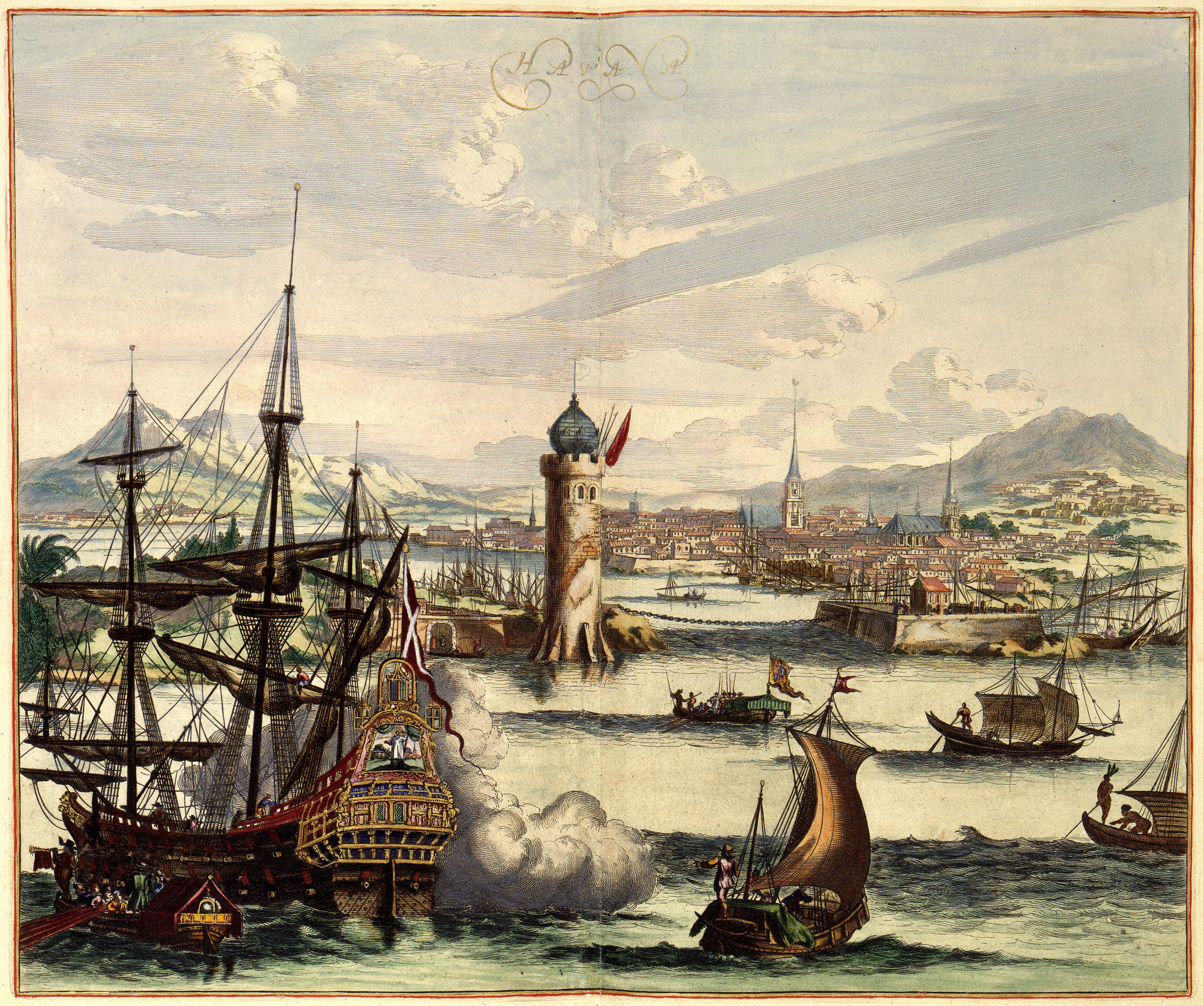
17th-century print of colonial Havana

Large numbers of enslaved Africans and European, mostly Spanish, immigrants came to Cuba and brought their own forms of music to the island. European dances and folk musics included zapateo, fandango, paso doble and retambico. Later, northern European forms like minuet, gavotte, mazurka, contradanza, and the waltz appeared among urban whites. There was also an immigration of Chinese indentured laborers later in the 19th century.

Fernando Ortiz, the Cuban folklorist, described Cuba's musical innovations as arising from the interplay ('transculturation') between enslaved Africans settled on large sugar plantations and Spaniards from different regions such as Andalusia and the Canary Islands. The enslaved Africans and their descendants made many percussion instruments and preserved rhythms they had known in their homeland. The most important instruments were the drums, of which, there were originally about fifty different types; today only the bongos, congas and batá drums are regularly seen (the timbales are descended from kettle drums in Spanish military bands). Also important are the claves, two short hardwood batons, and the cajón, a wooden box, originally made from crates. Claves are still used often, and wooden boxes (cajones) were widely used during periods when the drum was banned. In addition, there are other percussion instruments in use for African-origin religious ceremonies. Chinese immigrants contributed the corneta china (Chinese cornet), a Chinese reed instrument still played in the comparsas, or carnival groups, of Santiago de Cuba.

The great instrumental contribution of the Spanish was their guitar, but even more important was the tradition of European musical notation and techniques of musical composition. Hernando de la Parra's archives give some of our earliest available information on Cuban music. He reported instruments including the clarinet, violin and vihuela. There were few professional musicians at the time, and fewer still of their songs survive. One of the earliest is Ma Teodora, supposed to be related to a freed slave, Teodora Ginés of Santiago de Cuba, who was famous for her compositions. The piece is said to be similar to 16th-, 17th- and 18th-century Spanish popular songs and dances.

Cuban music has its principal roots in Spain and West Africa, but over time has been influenced by diverse genres from different countries. Important among these are France (and its colonies in the Americas), and the United States.

Cuban music has been immensely influential in other countries. It contributed not only to the development of Latin jazz and salsa, but also to the Argentine tango and to the Arabo-Cuban music (Hanine Y Son Cubano) developed by Michel Elefteriades in the 1990s.

The African beliefs and practices certainly influenced Cuba's music. Polyrhythmic percussion is an inherent part of African music, as the melody is part of European music. Also, in African tradition, percussion is always joined to song and dance, and a particular social setting. The result of the meeting of European and African cultures is that most Cuban popular music is creolized. This creolization of Cuban life has been happening for a long time, and by the 20th century, elements of African belief, music, and dance were well integrated into popular and folk forms.

== Classical music ==
=== 18th and 19th centuries ===
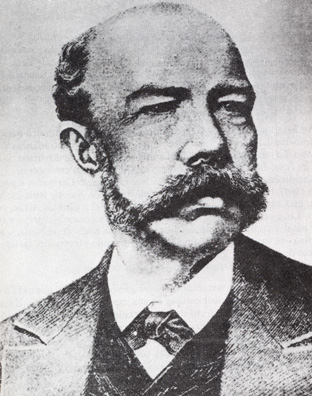
Manuel Saumell

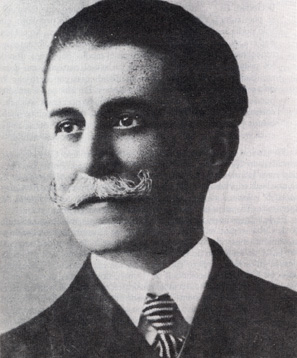
Ignacio Cervantes

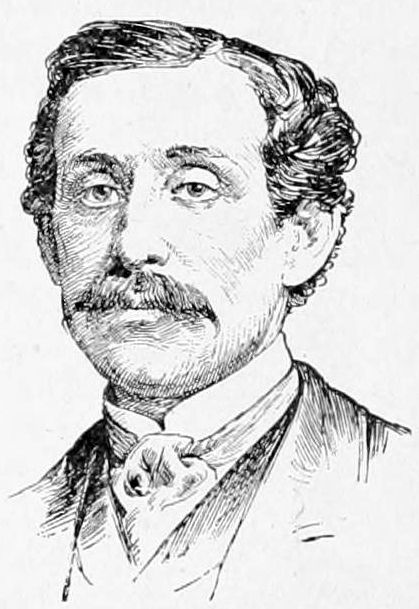
L. M. Gottschalk

Among internationally heralded composers of the "serious" genre can be counted the Baroque composer Esteban Salas y Castro (1725–1803), who spent much of his life teaching and writing music for the Church. He was followed in the Cathedral of Santiago de Cuba by the priest Juan París (1759–1845). París was an exceptionally industrious man and an important composer. He encouraged continuous and diverse musical events.^{p181} Aside from rural music and Afro-Cuban folk music, the most popular kind of urban Creole dance music in the 19th century was the contradanza, which commenced as a local form of the English country dance and the derivative French contredanse and Spanish contradanza. While many contradanzas were written for dance, from the mid-century several were written as light-classical parlor pieces for piano. The first distinguished composer in this style was Manuel Saumell (1818–1870), who is sometimes accordingly hailed as the father of Cuban creole musical development. According to Helio Orovio, "After Saumell's visionary work, all that was left to do was to develop his innovations, all of which profoundly influenced the history of Cuban nationalist musical movements."

In the hands of his successor, Ignacio Cervantes Kavanagh, the piano idiom related to the contradanza achieved even greater sophistication. Cervantes was called by Aaron Copland a "Cuban Chopin" because of his Chopinesque piano compositions. Cervantes' reputation today rests almost solely upon his famous forty-one Danzas Cubanas, which Carpentier said, "occupy the place that the Norwegian Dances of Grieg or the Slavic Dances of Dvořák occupy in the music of their respective countries". Cervantes' never-finished opera, Maledetto, is forgotten.

In the 1840s, the habanera emerged as a languid vocal song using the contradanza rhythm. (Non-Cubans sometimes called Cuban contradanzas "habaneras.") The habanera went on to become popular in Spain and elsewhere. The Cuban contradanza/danza was also an important influence on the Puerto Rican danza, which went on to enjoy its own dynamic and distinctive career lasting through the 1930s. In Cuba, in the 1880s the contradanza/danza gave birth to the danzón, which effectively superseded it in popularity.

Laureano Fuentes (1825–1898) came from a family of musicians and wrote the first opera to be composed on the island, La Hija de Jefté (Jefte's daughter). This was later lengthened and staged under the title Seila. His numerous works spanned all genres. Gaspar Villate (1851–1891) produced abundant and wide-ranging work, all centered on opera.^{p239} José White (1836–1918), a mulatto of a Spanish father and an Afrocuban mother, was a composer and a violinist of international merit. He learned to play sixteen instruments, and lived, variously, in Cuba, Latin America, and Paris. His most famous work is La Bella Cubana, a habanera.

During the middle years of the 19th century, a young American musician Louis Moreau Gottschalk (1829–1869) came to Cuba. Gottschalk's father was a Jewish businessman from London, and his mother a white creole of French Catholic background. Gottschalk was brought up mostly by his black grandmother and nurse Sally, both from Saint-Domingue. He was a piano prodigy who had listened to the music and seen the dancing in Congo Square, New Orleans from childhood. His period in Cuba lasted from 1853 to 1862, with visits to Puerto Rico and Martinique squeezed in. He composed many creolized pieces, such as the habanera Bamboula, Op. 2 (Danse de negres) (1845), the title referring to a bass Afro-Caribbean drum; El cocoye (1853), a version of a rhythmic melody already present in Cuba; the contradanza Ojos criollos (Danse cubaine) (1859) and a version of María de la O, which refers to a Cuban mulatto singer. These numbers made use of typical Cuban rhythmic patterns. At one of his farewell concerts he played his Adiós a Cuba to huge applause and shouts of 'bravo!' Unfortunately, his score for the work has not survived. In February 1860 Gottschalk produced a huge work, La nuit des tropiques, in Havana. The work used about 250 musicians and a choir of 200 singers plus a tumba francesa group from Santiago de Cuba. He produced another huge concert the following year, with new material. These shows probably dwarfed anything seen in the island before or since, and no doubt were unforgettable for those who attended.^{p147}

=== 20th-century classical and art music ===
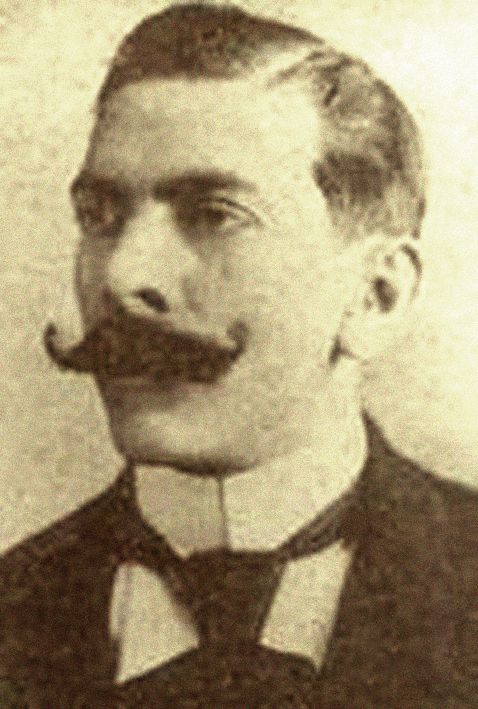
José Marín Varona

Between the end of the 19th century and the beginning of the 20th a number of composers excel within the Cuban music panorama. They cultivated genres such as the popular song and the concert lied, dance music, the zarzuela and the vernacular theatre, as well as symphonic music. Noteworthy are Hubert de Blanck (1856-1932), José Mauri (1856-1937), Manuel Mauri (1857-1939), José Marín Varona, Eduardo Sánchez de Fuentes (1874-1944), Jorge Anckermann (1877-1941), Luis Casas Romero (1882-1950), Mario Valdés Costa (1898-1930), and others.

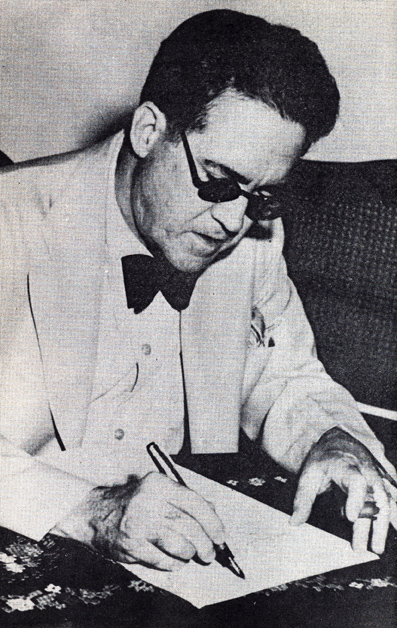
Gonzalo Roig

The work of José Marín Varona links the Cuban musical activity from the end of the 19th century and the beginning of the 20th century. In 1896, the composer included in his zarzuela "El Brujo" the first Cuban guajira which has been historically documented.

About this piece, composer Eduardo Sánchez de Fuentes said: "The honest critique of a not very far day will bestow the author of the immortal guajira of "El Brujo" the honor to which he is undoubtedly entitled at any time".

Gonzalo Roig (1890–1970) was a major force in the first half of the century. A composer and orchestral director, he qualified in piano, violin and composition theory. In 1922 he was one of the founders of the National Symphony Orchestra, which he conducted. In 1927 he was appointed Director of the Havana School of Music. As a composer he specialized in the zarzuela, a musical theatre form, very popular up to World War II. In 1931 he co-founded a bufo company (comic theatre) at the Teatro Martí in Havana. He was the composer of the most well-known Cuban zarzuela, Cecilia Valdés, based on the famous 19th-century novel about a Cuban mulata. It was premiered in 1932. He founded various organizations and wrote frequently on musical topics.

One of the greatest Cuban pianist/composers of the 20th century was Ernesto Lecuona (1895–1963). Lecuona composed over six hundred pieces, mostly in the Cuban vein, and was a pianist of exceptional quality. He was a prolific composer of songs and music for stage and film. His works consisted of zarzuela, Afro-Cuban and Cuban rhythms, suites and many songs that became Latin standards. They include "Siboney", "Malagueña" and "The Breeze And I" (Andalucía). In 1942 his great hit "Always in my heart" (Siempre en mi Corazon) was nominated for an Oscar for Best Song; it lost to "White Christmas". The Ernesto Lecuona Symphonic Orchestra performed the premiere of Lecuona's Black Rhapsody in the Cuban Liberation Day Concert at Carnegie Hall on 10 October 1943.

Although their music is rarely played today, Amadeo Roldán (1900–1939) and Alejandro García Caturla (1906–1940) were Cuba's symphonic revolutionaries during the first half of the 20th century. They both played a part in Afrocubanismo: the movement in black-themed Cuban culture with origins in the 1920s, and extensively analysed by Fernando Ortiz.

Roldan, born in Paris to a Cuban mulatta and a Spanish father, came to Cuba in 1919 and became the concert-master (first-chair violin) of the new Orquesta Sinfónica de La Habana in 1922. There he met Caturla, at sixteen a second violin. Roldan's compositions included Overture on Cuban themes (1925), and two ballets: La Rebambaramba (1928) and El milagro de Anaquille (1929). There followed a series of Ritmicas and Poema negra (1930) and Tres toques (march, rites, dance) (1931). In Motivos de son (1934) he wrote eight pieces for voice and instruments based on the poet Nicolás Guillén's set of poems with the same title. His last composition was two Piezas infantiles for piano (1937). Roldan died at 38 of a disfiguring facial cancer (he had been an inveterate smoker).

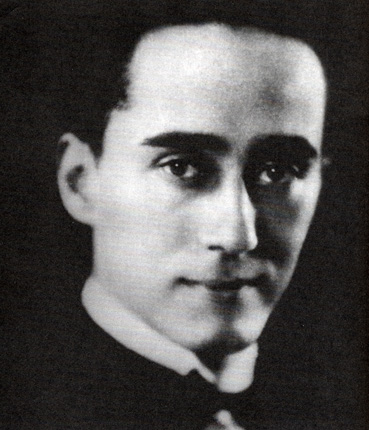
Alejandro García Caturla

After his student days, Caturla lived all his life in the small central town of Remedios, where he became a lawyer to support his growing family. His Tres danzas cubanas for symphony orchestra was first performed in Spain in 1929. Bembe was premiered in Havana the same year. His Obertura cubana won first prize in a national contest in 1938. Caturla was murdered at 34 by a young gambler.

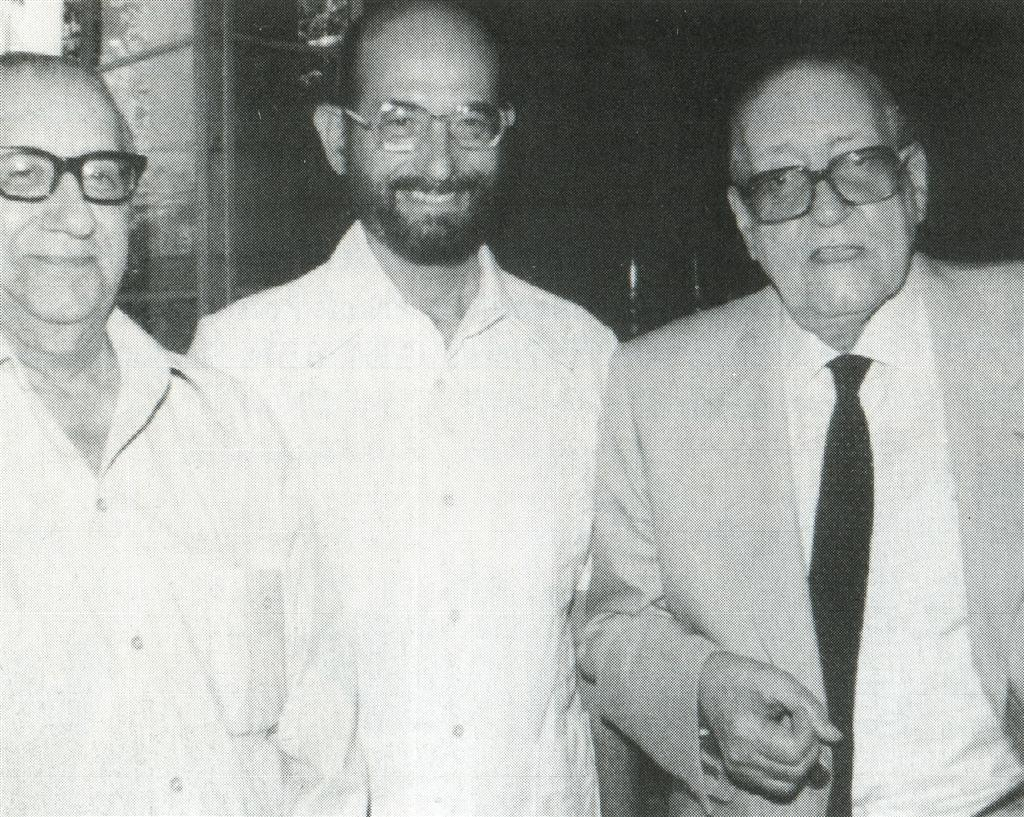
José Ardévol, Harold Gramatges, Alejo Carpentier

Founded in 1942 under the guidance of José Ardévol (1911–1981), a Catalan composer established in Cuba since 1930, the "Grupo de Renovación Musical" served as a platform for a group of young composers to develop a proactive movement with the purpose of improving and literally renovating the quality of the Cuban musical environment. During its existence from 1942 to 1948, the group organized numerous concerts at the Havana Lyceum in order to present their avant-garde compositions to the general public and fostered within its members the development of many future conductors, art critics, performers and professors. They also started a process of investigation and reevaluation of the Cuban music in general, discovering the outstanding work of Carlo Borbolla and promoting the compositions of Saumell, Cervantes, Caturla and Roldán. The "Grupo de Renovación Musical" included the following composers: Hilario González, Harold Gramatges, Julián Orbón, Juan Antonio Cámara, Serafín Pro, Virginia and Margot Fleites, Gisela Hernández, Enrique Aparicio Bellver, Argeliers León, Dolores Torres and Edgardo Martín.^{:176} Other contemporary Cuban composers that were little or no related at all to the "Groupo de Renovación Musical" were: Aurelio de la Vega, Joaquín Nin-Culmell, Alfredo Diez Nieto and Natalio Galán.

Although, in Cuba, many composers have written both classical and popular creole types of music, the distinction became clearer after 1960, when (at least initially) the regime frowned on popular music and closed most of the night-club venues, whilst providing financial support for classical music rather than creole forms. From then on, most musicians have kept their careers on one side of the invisible line or the other. After the Cuban Revolution in 1959, a new crop of classical musicians came onto the scene. The most important of these is guitarist Leo Brouwer, who have made significant contributions to the technique and repertoire of the modern classical guitar, and has been the director of the National Symphony Orchestra of Cuba. His directorship in the early 1970s of the "Grupo de Experimentacion Sonora del ICAIC" was instrumental in the formation and consolidation of the Nueva trova movement.

Other important composers from the early post-revolution period that began in 1959 were: Carlos Fariñas and Juan Blanco, a pioneer of "concrete" and "electroacoustic music" in Cuba.

Left column, top to bottom: Armando Rodríguez Ruidíaz, Carlos Malcolm, Juan Piñera. Right column, top to bottom: Flores Chaviano, Magali Ruiz, Danilo Avilés.

Closely following the early post-revolution generation, a group of young composers started to attract the attention of the public that attended classical music concerts. Most of them had obtained degrees in reputable Schools outside the country thanks to scholarships granted by the government, like Sergio Fernández Barroso (also known as Sergio Barroso), that received a post-graduate degree from the Superior Academy of Music in Prague, and Roberto Valera, who studied with Witold Rudziński and Andrzej Dobrowolski in Poland. Three other composers belong to this group: Calixto Alvarez, Carlos Malcolm and Héctor Angulo.

In 1962, the North American composer Federico Smith arrives in Havana. He embraced the Cuban nation as his own country and became one of the most accomplished musicians living and working in Cuba at that time. He remained in Cuba until his death, and made an important contribution to the Cuban musical patrimony.

During the early 1970s, a group of musicians and composers, most of them graduated from the National School of Arts and the Havana Conservatory, gathered around an organization recently created by the government as the junior section of UNEAC (National Union of Writers and Artists of Cuba), the Brigada Hermanos Saíz. Some of its member were composers Juan Piñera (nephew of the renowned Cuban writer Virgilio Piñera), Flores Chaviano, Armando Rodríguez Ruidíaz, Danilo Avilés, Magaly Ruiz, Efraín Amador Piñero and José Loyola. Other contemporary composers less involved with the organization were José María Vitier, Julio Roloff, and Jorge López Marín.

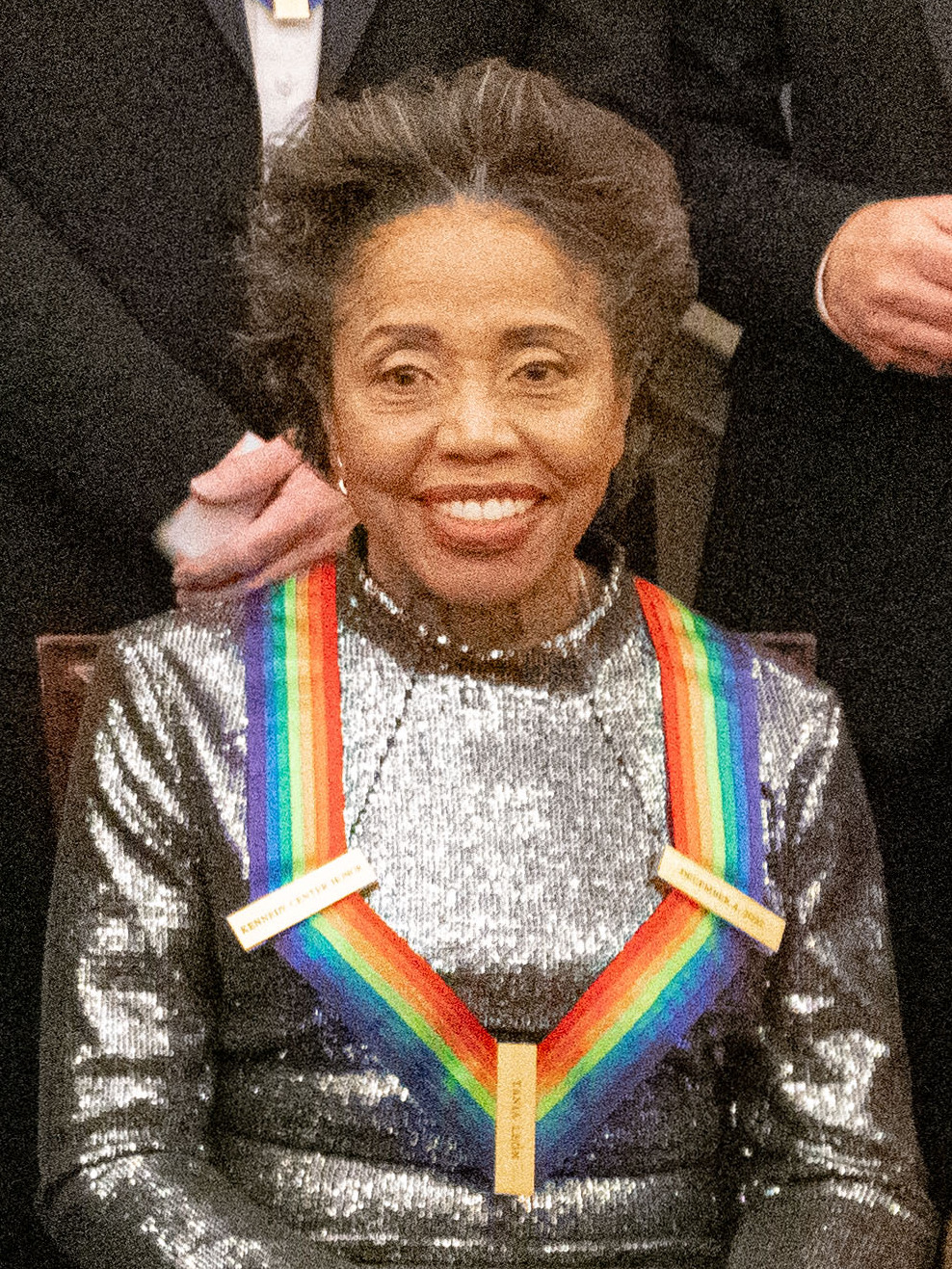
Tania León

After the Cuban Revolution (1959), many future Cuban composers emigrated at a very young age and developed most of their careers outside the country. Within this group are the composers Tania León, Orlando Jacinto García, Armando Tranquilino, Odaline de la Martinez, José Raul Bernardo, Jorge Martín (composer) and Raul Murciano.

=== 21st-century classical and art music ===
During the last decades of the 20th century and the beginning of the 21st century a new generation of composers emerged into the Cuban classical music panorama. Most of them received a solid musical education provided by the official arts school system created by the Cuban government and graduated from the Instituto Superior de Arte (ISA). Some of those composers are Louis Franz Aguirre, Ileana Pérez Velázquez, Keila María Orozco, Viviana Ruiz, Fernando (Archi) Rodríguez Alpízar, Yalil Guerra, Eduardo Morales Caso, Ailem Carvajal Gómez, Irina Escalante Chernova and Evelin Ramón. All of them have emigrated and currently live and have worked in other countries.

=== Electroacoustic music in Cuba ===
Juan Blanco was the first Cuban composer to create an electroacoustic piece in 1961. This first composition, titled "Musica Para Danza", was produced with just an oscillator and three common tape recorders. Access to the necessary technological resources to produce electroacoustic music was always very limited for anyone interested. For this reason, it was not until 1969 that another Cuban composer, Sergio Barroso, dedicated himself to the creation of electroacoustic musical compositions.

In 1970, Juan Blanco began to work as a music advisor for the Department of Propaganda of ICAP (Insituto Cubano de Amistad con Los Pueblos). In this capacity, he created electroacoustic music for all the audiovisual materials produced by ICAP. After nine years working without restitution, Blanco finally obtained financing to set up an Electroacoustic Studio to be used for his work. He was appointed as Director of the Studio, but under the condition that he should be the only one to use the facility.

After a few months, and without asking for permission, he opened the Electroacoustic Studio to all composers interested in working with electroacoustic technology, thus creating the ICAP Electroacoustsic Music Workshop (TIME), where he himself provided training to all participants. In 1990, the ICAP Workshop changed its name to Laboratorio Nacional de Música Electroacústica (LNME) and its main objective was to support and promote the work of Cuban electroacoustic composers and sound artists.

Some years later, another electroacoustic music studio was created at the Instituto Superior de Arte (ISA). The Estudio de Música Electroacústica y por Computadoras (EMEC), currently named Estudio Carlos Fariñas de Arte Musical (Carlos Fariñas Studio of Musical Electroacoustic Art), is intended to provide electroacoustic music training to the composition students during the last years of their careers.

After 1970, Cuban composers such as Leo Brouwer, Jesús Ortega, Carlos Fariñas and Sergio Vitier began also creating electroacoustic pieces; and in the 1980s a group of composers that included Edesio Alejandro, Fernando (Archi) Rodríguez Alpízar, Marietta Véulens, Mirtha de la Torre, Miguel Bonachea and Julio Roloff started receiving instruction and working at the ICAP Electroacoustic Studio. Cuban composers that have utilized elecotroacoustics technology include Argeliers León, Juan Piñera, Roberto Valera, José Loyola, Ileana Pérez Velázquez and José Angel Pérez Puentes.

Most Cuban composers that established their residence outside Cuba have worked with electroacoustic technology. These include composers Aurelio de la Vega, Armando Tranquilino, Tania León, Orlando Jacinto García, Armando Rodríguez Ruidíaz, Ailem Carvajal Gómez and Irina Escalante Chernova.

=== Classical guitar in Cuba ===
==== From the 16th to the 19th century ====
The guitar (as it is known today or in one of its historical versions) has been present in Cuba since the discovery of the island by Spain. As early as the 16th century, a musician named Juan Ortiz, from the village of Trinidad, is mentioned by famous chronicler Bernal Díaz del Castillo as "gran tañedor de vihuela y viola" ("a great performer of the vihuela and the guitar"). Another "vihuelista", Alonso Morón from Bayamo, is also mentioned in the Spanish conquest chronicles during the 16th century.

A disciple of famous Spanish guitarist Dionisio Aguado, José Prudencio Mungol was the first Cuban guitarist trained in the Spanish guitar tradition. In 1893 he performed at a much-acclaimed concert in Havana, after returning from Spain. Mungol actively participated in the musical life of Havana and was a professor at the Hubert de Blanck conservatory.

==== 20th century and beyond ====
Severino López was born in Matanzas. He studied guitar in Cuba with Juan Martín Sabio and Pascual Roch, and in Spain with renowned Catalan guitarist Miguel Llobet. Severino López is considered the initiator in Cuba of the guitar school founded by Francisco Tárrega in Spain.

Clara Romero (1888-1951), founder of the modern Cuban School of Guitar, studied in Spain with Nicolás Prats and in Cuba with Félix Guerrero. She inaugurated the guitar department at the Havana Municipal Conservatory in 1931, where she also introduced the teachings of the Cuban folk guitar style. She created the Guitar Society of Cuba (Sociedad Guitarrística de Cuba) in 1940, and also the "Guitar" (Guitarra) magazine, with the purpose of promoting the Society's activities. She was the professor of many Cuban guitarists including her son Isaac Nicola and her daughter Clara (Cuqui) Nicola.

After studying with his mother, Clara Romero, at the Havana Municipal Conservatory, Isaac Nicola (1916 – 1997) continued his training in Paris with Emilio Pujol, a disciple of Francisco Tárrega. He also studied the vihuela with Pujol and researched about the guitar's history and literature.

==== Modern Cuban Guitar School ====
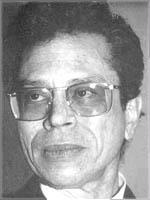
Leo Brouwer

After the Cuban revolution in 1959, Isaac Nicola and other professors such as Marta Cuervo, Clara (Cuqui) Nicola, Marianela Bonet and Leopoldina Núñez were integrated to the national music schools system, where a unified didactical method was implemented. This was a nucleus for the later development of a national Cuban Guitar School with which a new generation of guitarists and composers collaborated.

Maybe the most important contribution to the modern Cuban guitar technique and repertoire comes from Leo Brouwer (born 1939). The grandson of Ernestina Lecuona, sister of Ernesto Lecuona, Brouwer began studying the guitar with his father and after some time continued with Isaac Nicola. He taught himself harmony, counterpoint, musical forms and orchestration before completing his studies at the Juilliard School and the University of Hartford.

==== New generations ====
Since the 1960s, several generations of guitar performers, professors and composers have been formed under the Cuban Guitar School at educational institutions such as the Havana Municipal Conservatory, the National School of Arts, and the Instituto Superior de Arte. Others, such as Manuel Barrueco, a concertist of international renown, developed their careers outside the country. Among many other guitarists related to the Cuban Guitar School are Carlos Molina, Sergio Vitier, Flores Chaviano, Efraín Amador Piñero, Armando Rodríguez Ruidíaz, Martín Pedreira, Lester Carrodeguas, Mario Daly, José Angel Pérez Puentes and Teresa Madiedo. A younger group includes guitarists Rey Guerra, Aldo Rodríguez Delgado, Pedro Cañas, Leyda Lombard, Ernesto Tamayo, Miguel Bonachea, Joaquín Clerch and Yalil Guerra.

=== Classical piano in Cuba ===
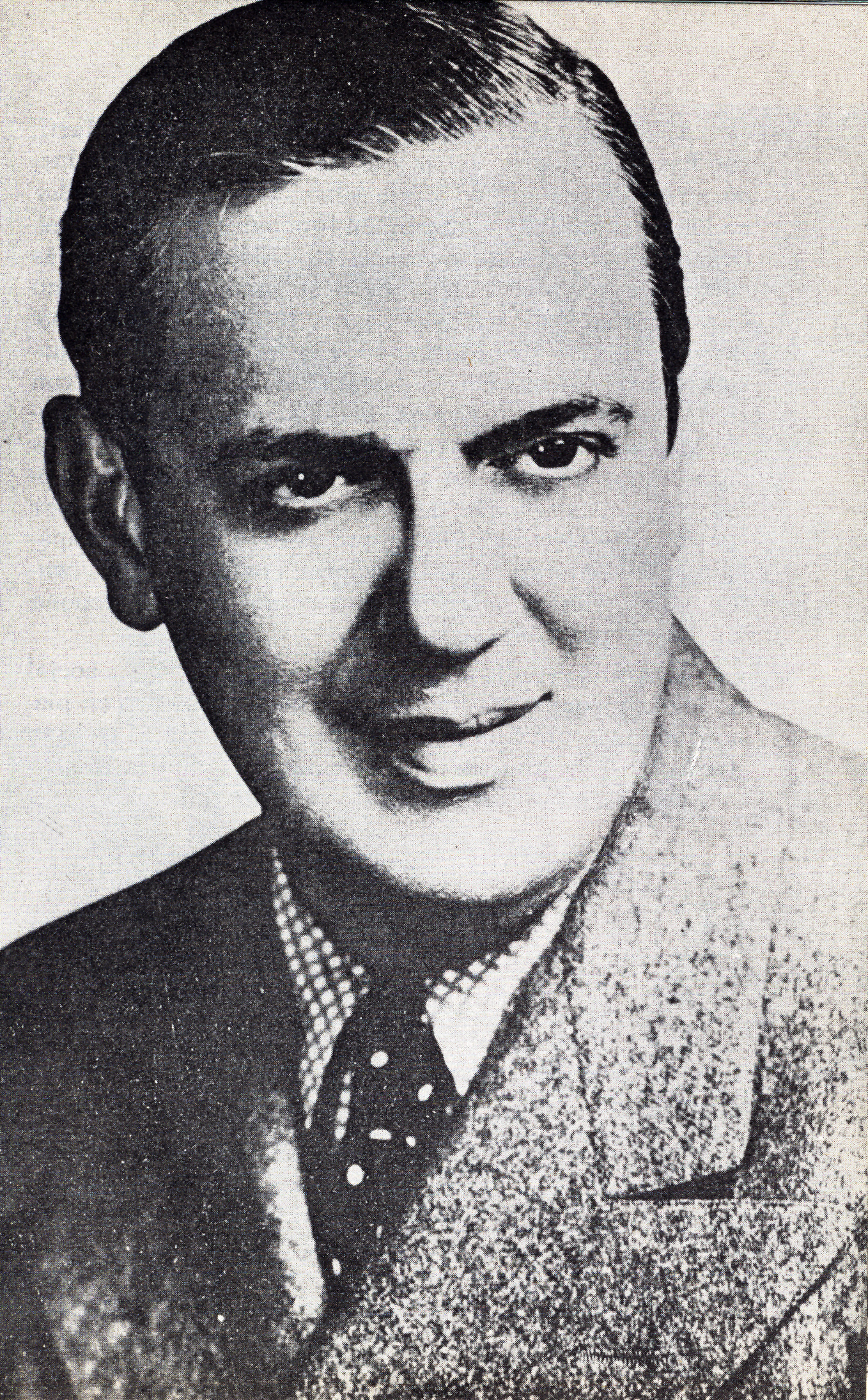
Ernesto Lecuona

After its arrival in Cuba at the end of the 18th century, the pianoforte (commonly called piano) rapidly became one of the favorite instruments among the Cuban population. Along with the humble guitar, the piano accompanied the popular Cuban "guarachas" and "contradanzas" (derived from the European Country Dances) at salons and ballrooms in Havana and all over the country. As early as in 1804, a concert program in Havana announced a vocal concert "accompanied at the fortepiano by a distinguished foreigner recently arrived" and in 1832, Juan Federico Edelmann (1795-1848), a renowned pianist, son of a famous Alsatian composer and pianist, arrived in Havana and gave a very successful concert at the Teatro Principal. Encouraged by the warm welcome, Edelmann decided to stay in Havana, and he was very soon promoted to an important position within the Santa Cecilia Philharmonic Society. In 1836, he opened a music store and publishing company.

One of the most prestigious Cuban musicians, Ernesto Lecuona (1895-1963), began studying piano with his sister Ernestina and continued with Peyrellade, Saavedra, Nin and Hubert de Blanck. A child prodigy, Lecuona gave a concert, at age five, at the Círculo Hispano. When he graduated from the National Conservatory, he was awarded the First Prize and the Gold Medal of his class by unanimous decision of the board. He is by far the Cuban composer of greatest international recognition and his contributions to the Cuban piano tradition are considered exceptional.

=== From the 16th to the 18th century ===
Bowed stringed instruments have been present in Cuba since the 16th century. Musician Juan Ortiz from the Ville of Trinidad is mentioned by chronicler Bernal Díaz del Castillo as a "great performer of "vihuela" and "viola". On In 1764, Esteban Salas y Castro, became the new chapel master of the Santiago de Cuba Cathedral, and to fulfill his musical duties he counted with a small vocal-instrumental group that included two violins. In 1793, numerous colonists fleeing from the slave revolt in Saint Domingue arrived in Santiago de Cuba, and an orchestra consisting of a flute, oboe, clarinet, trumpet, three horns, three violins, viola, two violoncellos, and percussion was founded.

==== From the 18th to the 19th century ====
During the transition from the 18th to the 19th centuries, the Havanese Ulpiano Estrada (1777–1847) offered violin lessons and conducted the Teatro Principal orchestra from 1817 to 1820. Apart from his activity as a violinist, Estrada kept a very active musical career as a conductor of numerous orchestras, bands and operas, and composing many contradanzas and other dance pieces, such as minuets and valses.

José Vandergutch, Belgian violinist, arrived at Havana along with his father Juan and brother Francisco, also violinists. They later returned to Belgium, but José established his permanent residence in Havana, where he acquired great recognition. Vandergutch offered numerous concerts as a soloist and accompanied by several orchestras, around the mid-19th century. He was a member of the Classical Music Association and also a Director of The "Asociación Musical de Socorro Mutuo de La Habana."

Within the universe of the classical Cuban violin during the 19th century, there are two outstanding Masters that may be considered among the greatest violin virtuosos of all time; they are José White Lafitte y Claudio Brindis de Salas Garrido.

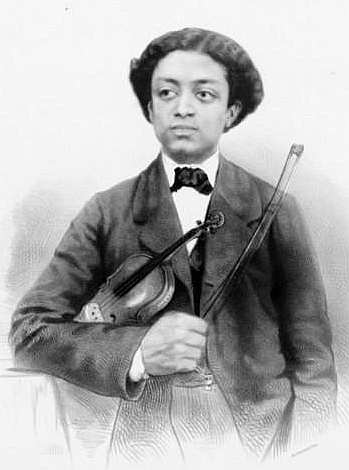
José White in 1856, after receiving ana award from the Conservatoire de Paris

After receiving his first musical instruction from his father, the virtuoso Cuban violinist José White Lafitte (1835–1918) offered his first concert in Matanzas on March 21, 1854. In that presentation he was accompanied by the famous American pianist and composer Louis Moreau Gottschalk, whom encouraged him to further his musical instruction in Paris, and also collected funds for that purpose.

José White studied musical composition in the Conservatoire de Paris from 1855 to 1871. Ten months after his arrival he won the first prize in the violin category on the Conservatorie's contest and was highly praised by Gioachino Rossini. Later he was a professor of the renowned violinists George Enescu and Jacques Thibaud.

From 1877 to 1889, White was appointed as Director of the Imperial Conservatory in Rio de Janeiro, Brasil, where he also served as court musician of the Emperor Pedro II. Later he returned to Paris, where he stayed until his death. The famous violin named "Swan's song" was his preferred instrument and his most famous composition is the Habanera "La bella cubana". White also composed many other pieces, including a concert for violin and orchestra.

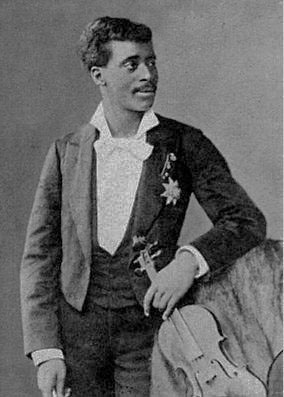
Claudio José Domingo Brindis de Salas y Garrido, called the "Black "Paganini" posing with his famous Stradivarius

Claudio José Domingo Brindis de Salas y Garrido (1852–1911) was a renowned Cuban violinist, son of the also famous violinist, double-bassist and conductor Claudio Brindis de Salas (1800-1972), which conducted one of the most popular orchestras of Havana during the first half of the 19th century, named "La Concha de Oro" (The Golden Conch). Claudio José surpassed the fame and expertise of his father and came to acquire international recognition.

Claudio Brindis de Salas Garrido began his musical studies with his father and continued with Maestros José Redondo and the Belgian José Vandergutch. He offered his first concert in Havana in 1863, in which Vandegutch participated as accompanist. The famous pianist and composer Ignacio Cervantes also participated in that event.

According with the contemporary critique, Brindis de Salas was considered one of the most outstanding violinists of his time at an international level. Alejo Carpentier referred to him as: "The most outstanding black violinist from the 19th century... something without any precedent in the musical history of the continent".

The French government named him member of the Légion d'Honneur, and gave him a nobility title of "Baron". In Buenos Aires he received a genuine Stradivarius, and while living in Berlin he married a German woman, was named Chamber Musician of the Emperor and received an honorary citizenship from that country. Brindis de Salas died poor and forgotten in 1911 from tuberculosis, in Buenos Aires, Argentina. In 1930 his remains were transferred to Havana with great honors.

Another outstanding Cuban violinist from the 19th century was Rafael Díaz Albertini (1857–1928). He studied violin with José Vandergutch and Anselmo López (1841-1858), well known Havanese violinist that was dedicated also to music publishing. In 1870, Albertini travelled to Paris with the purpose of perfecting his technique with famous violinist Jean-Delphin Alard, and in 1875 received First prize in the Paris Contest, in which he subsequently participated as a Juror. He toured extensively through the world, accompanied some times by prestigious Masters such as Hugo Wolf and Camille Saint-Saëns. In 1894 he made presentations, along with Ignacion Cervantes, through the most important cities of Cuba.

Prominent Cuban violinists from the second half of the 19th century and the first of the 20th include Manuel Muñoz Cedeño (b. 1813), José Domingo Bousquet (b. 1823), Carlos Anckermann (b. 1829), Antonio Figueroa (b. 1852), Ramón Figueroa (b. 1862), Juan Torroella (b.1874), Casimiro Zertucha (b. 1880), Joaquín Molina (b. 1884), Marta de La Torre (1888), Catalino Arjona (b. 1895) and Diego Bonilla (1898-).

==== From the 20th to the 21st century ====
During the first half of the 20th century the name of Amadeo Roldán stands out (1900–1939), because apart from an excellent violinist, professor and conductor, Roldán is considered one of the most important Cuban composers of all time.

After his graduation at the Conservatoire de Paris in 1935 at 16 years old, the renowned Cuban violinist Ángel Reyes (1919–1988) developed a very successful career as a soloist and also accompanied by prestigious orchestras of many countries. He established his residence in the United States at a very young age, obtained an award in the Ysaÿe Contest in Brussels and was a professor at the Michigan and Northwestern Universities, until his retirement in 1985.

Eduardo Hernández Asiaín (1911-2010) was born in Havana, began his musical studies at a very early age and offered his first concert when seven years old. When he was 14, he obtained the First Award at the Municipal Conservatory of Havana and was appointed as Concertino of the Havana Symphony Orchestra. In 1932, he travelled to Madrid to further his musical education with professors Enrique Fernández Arbós and Antonio Fernández Bordas. Since 1954, Hernández Asiaín performed as a soloist with the orchestras from the Pasdeloup Concert Society and the Radiodiffusion française in Paris, the "Orquesta Nacional de España", the "Orquesta Sinfónica de Bilbao", the "Orquesta de Cámara de Madrid" and the "Orquesta Sinfónica y de Cámara de San Sebastián", of which he is the founder. In 1968, he was appointed as First Violin of the "Cuarteto Clásico" of RTVE, participating with pianist Isabel Picaza González in the "Quinteto Clásico de RNE", with which he offered concerts and made numerous recordings in Spain and other countries. He also toured extensively through the US.

Other prominent Cuban violinists from the first half of the 20th century are: Robero Valdés Arnau (1919-1974), Alberto Bolet and Virgilio Diago.

After 1959, already in the post revolutionary period, stands out a Cuban violinist that has made a substantial contribution, not just to the development of the violin and the bowed string instruments, but also to the national musical culture in general.

Evelio Tieles began to study music in Cuba with his father, Evelio Tieles Soler, when he was seven years old, and continued later with professor Joaquín Molina. Between 1952 and 1954, Tieles studied violin in Paris, France, with Jacques Thibaud and René Benedetti. In 1955 he returned to Paris and studied at the National Superior Music Conservatory in that city, and in 1958, he continued his musical training at Conservatorio Tchaikovsky in Moscú, where he was a disciple of renowned violinists David Oistrakh and Igor Oistrakh. Tieles graduated in 1963 and by recommendation of the Conservatory he pursued his master's degree from 1963 to 1966, with the same mentioned professors. Tieles received also professional training from the prestigious violinists Henryk Szeryng and Eduardo Hernández Asiaín.

Evelio Tieles has offered numerous presentations as a concert performer, in a duo with his brother, pianist Cecilio Tieles, or accompanied by the Cuban National Symphony Orchestra and other symphonic and chamber ensembles. He has performed along with prestigious conductors such as Thomas Sanderling, Boris Brott, Enrique González Mántici y Manuel Duchesne Cuzán, among others.

Tieles has established his residence in Spain since 1984, and he teaches violin in the Vila-Seca Conservatory, in the province of Tarragona, where he has been appointed as "Professor Emeritus". He has also served at the Superior Conservatory of the Barcelona Lyceum as Chief of the Chamber Music Department (1991–1998), Head of the Division of Bowed String Instruments (1986-2002) and Academic Director (2000–2002).

Apart from his outstanding career as a concert performer and professor, during the Post-Revolutionary period, Tieles promoted and organized in Cuba the bowed string instruments training, fundamentally for the violin.

Another prominent violinist is professor Alla Tarán (1941). She was formed as a violinist in her native Ukraine and worked as a professor of Chamber Ensemble Practice. Tarán established her residence in Cuba since 1969.

Alfredo Muñoz (1949) began studying the violin at Conservatorio Orbon in Havana, Cuba, and subsequently continued at the National School of Arts and the Instituto Superior de Arte (ISA). He joined the National Symphony Orchestra as a violinist in 1972 and since then has been very active as a soloist and a member of the White Trio, in Cuba and abroad. He is currently a professor at the Instituto Superior de Artes (ISA).

Other Cuban violinists that have developed their careers between the 20th and the 21st century are: Armando Toledo (1950), Julián Corrales (1954), Miguel del Castillo and Ricardo Jústiz.

==== 21st century ====
At the beginning of the 21st century, the violinists Ilmar López-Gavilán, Mirelys Morgan Verdecia, Ivonne Rubio Padrón, Patricia Quintero and Rafael Machado are worthy of note.

=== Opera in Cuba ===
Opera has been present in Cuba since the latest part of the 18th century, when the first full-fledged theater, called Coliseo, was built. Since then to present times, the Cuban people have highly enjoyed opera, and many Cuban composers have cultivated the operatic genre, sometimes with great success at an international level. The best Cuban lyrical singer in the 20th century was the operatic tenor Francisco Fernandez Dominicis (Italian name: Francesco Dominici) (1885-1968). The best Cuban female lyrical singer in the 20th century was the mezzo-soprano Marta Perez (1924-2009). She sang at La Scala in Milan, Italy in 1955.

==== The 19th century ====
The first documented operatic event in Havana took place in 1776. That presentation was mentioned in a note published in the newspaper Diario de La Habana on December 19, 1815: "Today, Wednesday 19th of the current, if the weather allows, the new tragic opera of merit in three acts that contains 17 pieces of music, titled Dido Abandoned will be performed ... This is one of the premiere dramas from the French theater. In Italy, the one composed by renowned Metastasio deserved a singular applause, and was sung in this city on October 12, 1776."

Cristóbal Martínez Corrés was the first Cuban opera composer, but his works, such as El diablo contrabandista and Don papanero, were never premiered and have not been preserved until the present time. Born in Havana, in 1822, composer and pianist Martínez Corrés established his residence together with his family in France when he was nine years old; later they went to Italy. Due to his premature death, a third opera, named Safo, never surpassed an early creative stage. Martínez Corrés died in Genoa, in 1842.

Gaspar Villate y Montes was born in Havana, in 1851 and since an early age he showed a great musical talent. As a child, he began to study piano with Nicolás Ruiz Espadero and in 1867, when he was 16 years old, he composed his first opera on a drama by Victor Hugo, titled Angelo, tirano de Padua. A year later, at the beginning of the 1868 war, he travelled to the United States with his family, and upon his return to Havana in 1871 he wrote another opera, called Las primeras armas de Richelieu.

Villate travelled to France to continue his music studies in the Paris Conservatory, where he received classes from François Bazin, Victorien de Joncieres and Adolphe Danhauser. He composed numerous instrumental pieces such as contradanzas, habaneras, romances and waltzes, and in 1877 he premiered with great audience acclaim his opera Zilia in Paris, which was presented in Havana in 1881. Since then, Villate focused his efforts mainly in opera and composed pieces such as La Zarina and Baltazar, premiered at La Haya and Teatro Real de Madrid respectively. It is known that he worked on an opera with a Cuban theme called Cristóbal Colón, but its manuscript has been lost.

Villate died in Paris in 1891, soon after starting to compose a lyrical drama called Lucifer, from which some fragments have been preserved.

==== From 1901 to 1959 ====
Eduardo Sánchez de Fuentes was born in Havana, in 1874, within an artistic family; his father was a writer and his mother a pianist and singer. He began his musical studies at Conservatorio Hubert de Blanck and later took classes from Carlos Anckermann. He received also a law degree in 1894. When Sánchez de Fuentes was 18 years old, he composed the famous Habanera "Tú", which became an extraordinary international success. Alejo Carpentier said it was "the most famous Habanera".

On October 26, 1898, Sánchez de Fuentes premiered at the Albisu Theatre in Havana his first opera, called Yumuri, based on the island's colonization theme. In it, an aborigine princess falls in love with a handsome Spanish conqueror, who abducts her at the wedding ceremony with another indigenous character. At the end, while escaping, both suffer a tragic death during an earthquake. Sánchez de Fuentes would go on to compose another five operas: El Náufrago (1901), Dolorosa (1910), Doreya (1918), El Caminante (1921) and Kabelia (1942).

==== From 1960 to present time ====
One of the most active and outstanding composers of his generation, Sergio Fernández Barroso (also known as Sergio Barroso) (1946), is the author of an opera called La forma del camino, which also possesses the complementary title of s-XIV-69 (which means Siglo XIV – 1969). With an approximate duration of 60 minutes, this piece utilizes as a script a story from the Popol Vuh (the sacred text of the Maya culture) about the mythic brothers Hunahpu and Ixbalanqué. The score includes soloists and a choir of nine mixed voices, accompanied by an instrumental group and an electro-acoustic quadraphonic system. The scene requires a stage elevated over the choir spatial position, which members wear dinner jackets, in opposition to the more casual attire of the soloists. All singers wear Indian masks.

Most recently the work of two young Cuban composers stand out, Jorge Martín (composer) and Louis Franz Aguirre.

Jorge Martín (1959) was born in Santiago de Cuba and established his residence in the US at a very young age. He studied musical composition at the Yale and Columbia Universities. He has composed three lyric pieces: Beast and Superbeast, a series of four operas in one act each, based on short stories by Saki; Tobermory, opera in one act that obtained first prize in the Fifth Biennial of the National Opera Association (USA), and has been presented in several cities of the United States; and Before Night Falls, an opera based on the famous autobiography of the Cuban novelist, playwright and poet Reinaldo Arenas, renowned dissident from the Fidel Castro government.

Louis Franz Aguirre (1968) is currently one of the most prolific and renowned Cuban composers at an international level. His catalog includes four operatic works: Ebbó (1998), premiered on January 17, 1999, at the Brotfabrik Theater in Bonn, Germany; Ogguanilebbe (Liturgy of the divine word) (2005), premiered in the Salla dil Parlamento d'il Castello di Udine, Italy; Yo el Supremo (Comic play with Dictator in one Act), premiered on October 27, 2015, in the Teatro Galileo, Madrid, Spain; and The way the dead love (Theogony: an operatic manifest), commissioned by the Lydenskab Ensemble and financed by KODA, Denmark. It premiered on February 24, 2017, in Godsbanen, Aarhus, Denmark, as part of the Århus European Capital of Culture 2017.

== Musicology in Cuba ==
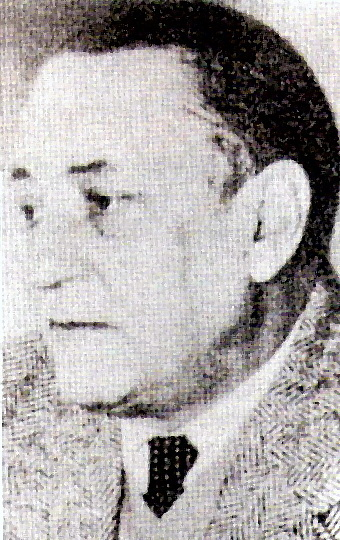
Alejo Carpentier

Throughout the years, the Cuban nation has developed a wealth of musicological material created by numerous investigators and experts on this subject. The work of some authors who provided information about the music in Cuba during the 19th century was usually included in chronicles covering a more general subject. The first investigations and studies specifically dedicated to the musical art and practice did not appear in Cuba until the beginning of the 20th century.

Some important personalities that have contributed to musicological studies in Cuba are Fernando Ortiz, Eduardo Sánchez de Fuentes, Emilio Grenet, Alejo Carpentier, Argeliers León, Maria Teresa Linares, Pablo Hernández Balaguer, Alberto Muguercia and Zoila Lapique.

A second generation of musicologists formed after the Cuban revolution of 1959 include Zoila Gómez, Victoria Elí, Alberto Alén Pérez, Rolando Antonio Pérez Fernández and Leonardo Acosta.

Most recently, a group of young Cuban musicologists have earned a well deserved reputation within the international academic field, due to their solid investigative work. Some of the most prominent members of this group are Miriam Escudero Suástegui, Liliana González Moreno, Iván César Morales Flores and Pablo Alejandro Suárez Marrero.

== Popular music ==
=== Hispanic heritage ===
The first popular music played in Cuba after the Spanish conquest was brought by the Spanish conquerors themselves, and was most likely borrowed from the Spanish popular music in vogue during the 16th century. From the 16th to the 18th century some danceable songs that emerged in Spain were associated with Hispanic America, or considered to have originated in America. Some of these songs with picturesque names such as Sarabande, Chaconne, Zambapalo, Retambico and Gurumbé, among others, shared a common trait, its characteristic rhythm called Hemiola or Sesquiáltera (in Spain).

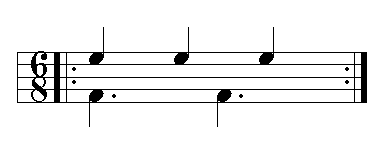
Vertical hemiola.

This rhythm has been described as the alternation or superposition of a duple meter and a triple meter (6/8 + 3/4), and its utilization was widespread in the Spanish territory since at least the 13th century, where it appears in one of the Cantigas de Santa María (Como poden per sas culpas).

Hemiola or Sesquiáltera is also a typical rhythm within the African musical traditions, both from the North of the Continent as from the South. Therefore, it is quite probable that the original song-dances brought by the Spanish to America already included elements from the African culture with which the enslaved Africans that arrived to the Island were familiar; and they further utilized them in order to create new creole genres.

The well known Son de la Ma Teodora, an ancient Cuban song, as well as the first Cuban autochthonous genres, Punto and Zapateo, show the Sesquiáltera rhythm on their accompaniment, which greatly associate those genres to the Spanish song-dances from the 16th to the 18th centuries.

== Música campesina (peasant music) ==
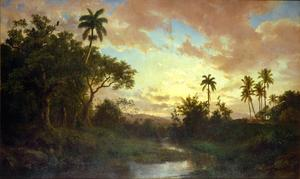
Cuban rural landscape

It seems that Punto and Zapateo Cubano were the first autochthonous musical genres of the Cuban nation. Although the first printed sample of a Cuban Creole Zapateo (Zapateo Criollo) was not published until 1855 in the "Álbum Regio of Vicente Díaz de Comas", it is possible to find references about the existence of those genres since long time before. Its structural characteristics have survived almost unaltered through a period of more than two hundred years and they are usually considered the most typically Hispanic Cuban popular music genres. Cuban musicologists María Teresa Linares, Argeliers León and Rolando Antonio Pérez coincide in thinking that Punto and Zapateo are based on Spanish dance –songs (such as chacone and sarabande) that arrived first at the most important population centers such as Havana and Santiago de Cuba and then spread throughout the surrounding rural areas, where they were adopted and modified by the peasant (campesino) population later.

=== Punto guajiro ===
Punto guajiro or Punto Cubano, or simply Punto, is a sung genre of Cuban music, an improvised poetic-music art that emerged in the western and central regions of Cuba during the 19th century. Although Punto appears to come from an Andalusian origin, it is a true Cuban genre because of its creole modifications.

Punto is played by a group with various types of plucked string instruments: the tiple (a treble guitar currently in disuse), the Spanish guitar, the Cuban tres, and the laúd. The word punto refers to the use of a plucked technique (punteado), rather than strumming (rasgueado). Also some percussion instruments have been utilized such as the clave, the güiro and the guayo ( a metallic scraper). Singers gather themselves in contending teams, and improvise their lines.

They sing fixed melodies called "tonadas" which are based on a meter of ten strophe verses called "décimas", with intervals between stanzas to give the singers some time to prepare the next verse. Early compositions were sometimes recorded and published, as were the names of some of the singers and composers. Beginning around 1935, Punto reached a peak of popularity on Cuban radio.

Punto was one of the first Cuban genres recorded by American companies at the beginning of the 20th century, but later, interest waned and little effort was made to continue recording the live radio performances. A fan of this genre, stenographer Aida Bode, wrote down many verses as they were broadcast and, in 1997, her transcriptions were published in book form.

Celina González and Albita Rodríguez both sang Punto at the beginning of their careers, proving that the genre is still alive. Celina had one of the greatest voices in popular music, and her supporting group Campo Alegre was outstanding. For aficionados, however, Indio Naborí (Sabio Jesús Orta Ruiz, b. 30 September 1922) is the greatest name in Punto for his "decima" poetry, which he wrote daily for the radio and newspapers. He is also a published author with several collections of his poetry, much of which has a political nueva trova edge.

=== Zapateo ===
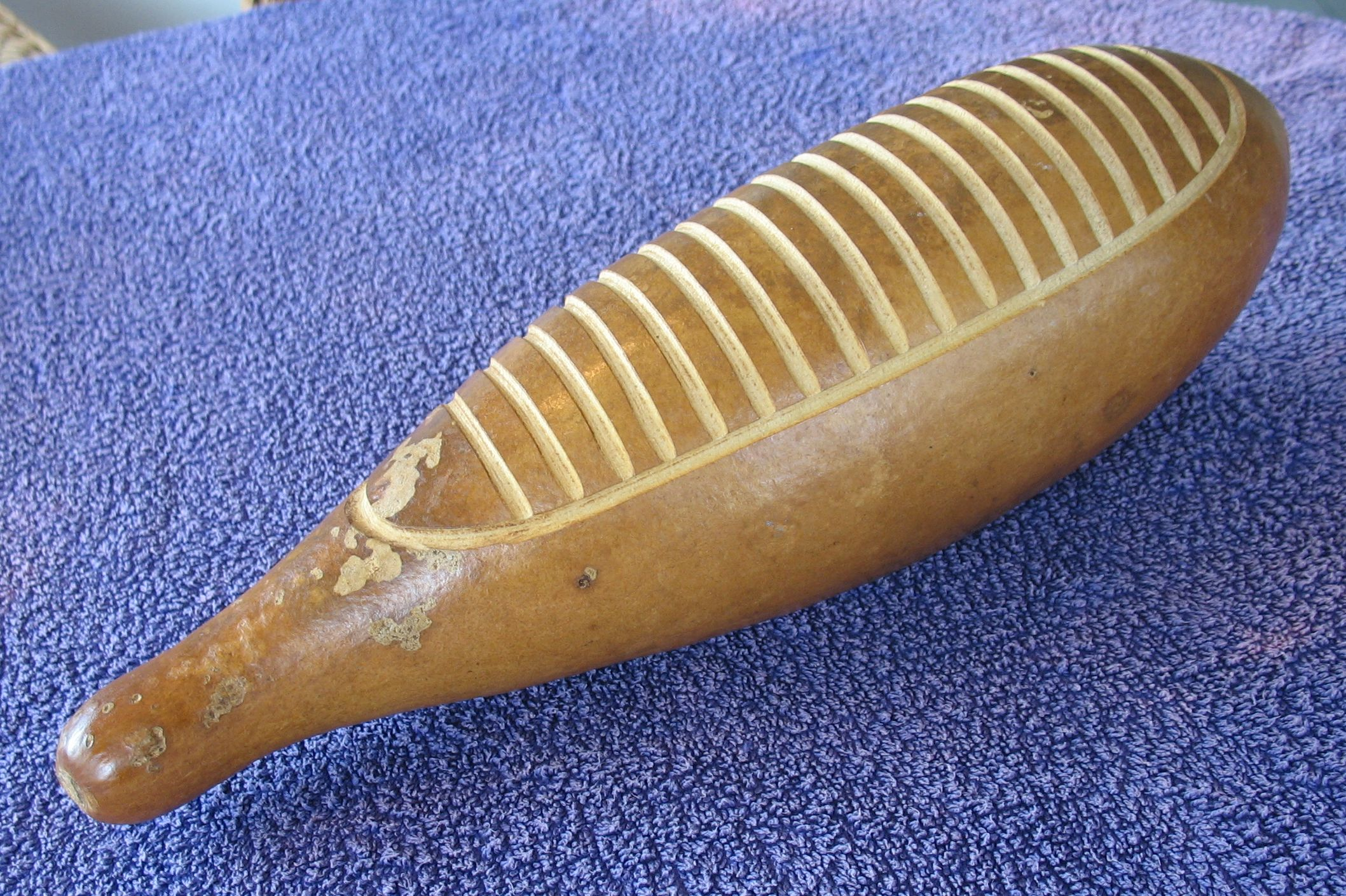
Cuban güiro

Zapateo is a typical dance of the Cuban "campesino" or "guajiro," of Spanish origin. It is a dance of pairs, involving tapping of the feet, mostly performed by the male partner. Illustrations exist from previous centuries and today it survives cultivated by Folk Music Groups as a fossil genre. It was accompanied by tiple, guitar and güiro, in combined 6/8 and 3/4 rhythm (hemiola), accented on the first of every three quavers.

=== Guajira ===
A genre of Cuban song similar to the Punto cubano and the Criolla. It contains bucolic countryside lyrics, similar to décima poetry. Its music shows a mixture of 6/8 and 3/4 rhythms called Hemiola. According to Sánchez de Fuentes, its first section is usually presented in a minor key, and its second section in its direct major relative key. The term Guajira is now used mostly to describe a slow dance music in 4/4 time, a fusion of the Guajira and the Son (called Guajira-Son). Singer and guitarist Guillermo Portabales was the most outstanding representative of this genre.

=== Criolla ===
Criolla is a genre of Cuban music which is closely related to the music of the Cuban Coros de Clave and a genre of Cuban popular music called Clave.

The Clave became a very popular genre in the Cuban vernacular theater and was created by composer Jorge Anckermann based on the style of the Coros de Clave. The Clave served, in turn, as a model for the creation of a new genre called Criolla. According to musicologist Helio Orovio, "Carmela", the first Criolla, was composed by Luis Casas Romero in 1909, which also created one of the most famous Criollas of all time, "El Mambí".

== African heritage ==
=== Origins of Cuban African groups ===
Clearly, the origin of African groups in Cuba is due to the island's long history of slavery. Compared to the US, slavery started in Cuba much earlier and continued for decades afterwards. Cuba was the last country in the Americas to abolish the importation of slaves, and the second last to free the slaves. In 1807 the British Parliament outlawed slavery, and from then on the British Navy acted to intercept Portuguese and Spanish slave ships. By 1860 the trade with Cuba was almost extinguished; the last slave ship to Cuba was in 1873. The abolition of slavery was announced by the Spanish Crown in 1880, and put into effect in 1886. Two years later, Brazil abolished slavery.

=== Subsequent organization ===
The roots of most Afro-Cuban musical forms lie in the cabildos, self-organized social clubs for the African slaves, separate cabildos for separate cultures. The cabildos were formed mainly from four groups: the Yoruba (the Lucumi in Cuba); the Congolese (Palo in Cuba); Dahomey (the Fon or Arará). Other cultures were undoubtedly present, more even than listed above, but in smaller numbers, and they did not leave such a distinctive presence.

Cabildos preserved African cultural traditions, even after the abolition of slavery in 1886. At the same time, African religions were transmitted from generation to generation throughout Cuba, Haiti, other islands and Brazil. These religions, which had a similar but not identical structure, were known as Lucumi or Regla de Ocha if they derived from the Yoruba, Palo from Central Africa, Vodú from Haiti, and so on. The term Santería was first introduced to account for the way African spirits were joined to Catholic saints, especially by people who were both baptized and initiated, and so were genuinely members of both groups. Outsiders picked up the word and have tended to use it somewhat indiscriminately. It has become a kind of catch-all word, rather like salsa in music.^{p171; p258}

=== African sacred music in Cuba ===
All of these African cultures had musical traditions, which survive to the present day in general style. The best preserved are the African polytheistic religions, where in Cuba the instruments, language, chants, dances and their interpretations are preserved. In what other American countries are the religious ceremonies conducted in the old language(s) of Africa? They certainly are in Lucumí ceremonies, though of course, back in Africa the language has moved on. African music is unified through the unity of polyrhythmic percussion, voice (call-and-response), dance in well-defined social settings, and the absence of melodic instruments of the Arabic or European kind.

=== Yoruba and Congolese rituals ===
Religious traditions of African origin have survived in Cuba, and are the basis of ritual music, song and dance quite distinct from the secular music and dance. The religion of Yoruban origin is known as Lucumí or Regla de Ocha; the religion of Congolese origin is known as Palo, as in palos del monte. There are also, in the Oriente region, forms of Haitian ritual together with its own instruments, music etc.

=== Clave ===
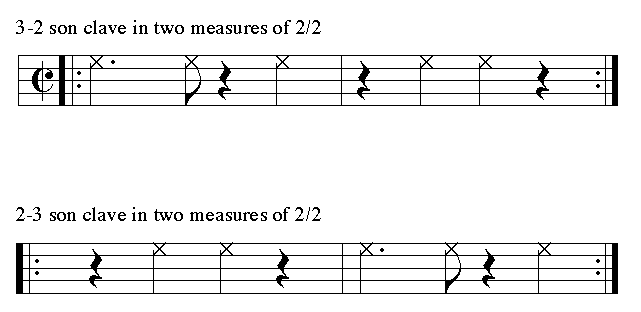
3-2 clave and 2-3 clave written in cut-time

The clave rhythmic pattern is used as a tool for temporal organization in Afro-Cuban music, such as rumba, conga de comparsa, son, mambo (music), salsa, Latin jazz, songo and timba. The five-stroke clave pattern (distributed in groups of 3 + 2 or 2 + 3 beats) represents the structural core of many Afro-Cuban rhythms. Just as a keystone holds an arch in place, the clave pattern holds the rhythm together in Afro-Cuban music. The clave pattern originated in sub-Saharan African music traditions, where it serves essentially the same function as it does in Cuba. The pattern is also found in the African diaspora musics of Haitian Vodou drumming and Afro-Brazilian music. The clave pattern is used in North American popular music as a rhythmic motif or ostinato, or simply a form of rhythmic decoration.

=== Cuban Carnival ===
In Cuba, the word comparsa refers to the "Cabildos de Nación" neighbourhood groups that took part in the carnival authorized by the Spanish government on the Three Kings Day (Día de Reyes) during the colonial period. Conga is of African origin, and derives from street celebrations of the African spirits. The distinction is blurred today, but in the past the congas have been prohibited from time to time. Carnival as a whole was banned by the revolutionary government for many years, and still does not take place with the regularity of old. Conga drums are played (along with other typical instruments) in comparsas of all kinds. Santiago de Cuba and Havana were the two main centers for street carnivals. Two types of dance music (at least) owe their origin to comparsa music:

Conga: an adaptation of comparsa music and dance for social dances. Eliseo Grenet may be the person who first created this music,^{p408} but it was the Lecuona Cuban Boys who took it around the world. The conga became, and perhaps still is, the best-known Cuban music and dance style for non-latins.

Mozambique is a comparsa-type dance music developed by Pello el Afrokan (Pedro Izquierdo) in 1963. It had a brief period of high popularity, peaked in 1965, and was soon forgotten. Apparently, to make it work properly, it needed 16 drums plus other percussion and dancers.

=== Tumba francesa ===
Immigrants from Haiti settled in Oriente and established their style of music, called Tumba Francesa, which uses its own type of drum, dance and song. It embodies one of the oldest and most tangible links to the Afro-Haitian heritage of Cuba's Oriente province and developed from an 18th-century fusion of music from Dahomey in West Africa and traditional French dances. This fossil genre survives to the present day in Santiago de Cuba and Haiti, performed by specialized folk ensembles.

=== The Black Curros (Negros Curros) ===
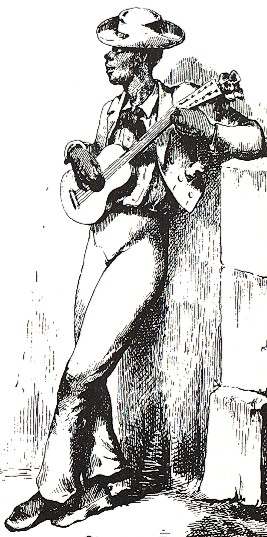
Negro Curro Juan Cocuyo

In reference to the emergence of the Guaracha and, later, also of the Urban Rumba in Havana and Matanzas, an important and picturesque social sector was called Black Curros (Negros Curros). Composed of free blacks that had arrived from Seville on an undetermined date, this group was integrated to the population of free blacks and mulattos that lived in the marginal zones of the city of Havana.

José Victoriano Betancourt, a Cuban "costumbrista" writer from the 19th century, described them as follows: "they [the curros] had a peculiar aspect, and was enough to look at them to recognize them as curros: their long hunks of kinky braids, falling over their face and neck like big millipedes, their teeth cut (sharp and pointed) to the carabalí style, their fine embroidered cloth shirts, their pants, almost always white, or with colored stripes, narrow at the waist and very wide in the legs; the canvas shoes, cut low with silver buckles, the short jacket with pointed tail, the exaggerated straw hat, with black hanging silk tassles, and the thick gold hoops that they wore in their ears, from which they hung harts and padlocks of the same metal, forming an ornament that only they wear; ... those were the curros of El Manglar (The mangrove neighborhood)."

The curro was dedicated to laziness, theft and procuring, while his companion, the curra, also called "mulata de rumbo", exercised the prostitution in Cuba. According to Carlos Noreña, she was well known for the use of burato shawls of meticulous work and plaited fringes, for which they used to pay from nine to ten ounces of gold", as well as by the typical clacking (chancleteo) they produced with their wooden slippers.

But the Curros also provided entertainment, including songs and dances to the thousands of Spanish men that came to the Island every year in the ships that followed the "Carrera de Indias", a route established by the Spanish Crown for their galleons in order to avoid attacks from pirates and privateers, and stayed for months until they returned to the Port of Seville.

Being subject to the influence of both the Spanish and the African culture from birth, they are supposed to have played an important role in the creolization of the Spanish song-dances original proto-type (copla-estribillo) that originated the Cuban Guaracha. The Black curro and the Mulata de Rumbo (Black Curra) disappeared since the mid-19th century by integrating to the Havana general population, but their picturesque images survived in social prototypes manifested in the characters of the Bufo Theater.

The famous "Mulatas de Rumbo" (mulatto characters) Juana Chambicú and María La O, as well as the black "cheches" (bullies) José Caliente "who rips in half those who oppose him," Candela, "negrito that flies and cuts with the knife," as well as the Black Curro Juán Cocuyo, were strongly linked to the characteristic image of the Black Curro and to the ambiance of the Guaracha and the Rumba.

== Dances ==
=== Contradanza ===
The contradanza is an important precursor of several later popular dances. It arrived in Cuba in the late 18th century from Europe, where it had been developed first as the English country dance, and then as the French contradanse. The origin of the word is a corruption of the English term "country dance". Manuel Saumell wrote over fifty contradanzas (in 2/4 or 6/8 time), in which his rhythmic and melodic inventiveness was astonishing.

The contradanza is a communal sequence dance, with the dance figures conforming to a set pattern. The selection of figures for a particular dance was usually set by a master of ceremonies or dance leader. There were two parts of 16 bars each, danced in a line or square format. The tempo and style of the music was bright and fairly fast.

The earliest Cuban creole composition of a contradanza appeared published in Havana in 1803 and was named San Pascual bailón. This version shows for the first time the well-known rhythm of "tango" or "Habanera" which differentiates it from the European contradance. The Cubans developed a number of creolized version, such as the "paseo", "cadena", "sostenido" and "cedazo". This creolization is an early example of the influence of the African traditions in the Caribbean. Most of the musicians were black or mulatto (even early in the 19th century there were many freed slaves and mixed race persons living in Cuban towns). "The women of Havana have a furious taste for dancing; they spend entire nights elevated, agitated, crazy and pouring sweat until they fall spent."

Rhythm of Tango or Habanera.

The contradanza supplanted the minuet as the most popular dance until 1842, when it gave way to the habanera, a quite different style.

=== Danza ===
This genere, the offspring of the contradanza, was also danced in lines or squares. It was also a brisk form of music and dance in double or triple time. A repeated 8-bar paseo was followed by two 16-bar sections called the primera and segunda. One famous composer of danzas was Ignacio Cervantes, whose forty-one danzas cubanas were a landmark in musical nationalism. This type of dance was eventually replaced by the danzón, which was, like the habanera, much slower and more sedate.

=== Habanera ===
The habanera developed out of the contradanza in the early 19th century. Its great novelty was that it was sung, as well as played and danced. Written in 2/4 meter, the habanera is characterized by an expressive and languid melodious development and its characteristic rhythm called "Habanera Rhythm."

The dance style of the habanera is slower and more stately than the danza. By the 1840s habaneras were written, sung, and danced in Mexico, Venezuela, Puerto Rico, and Spain. Since about 1900 the habanera has been a relic dance; but the music has a period charm, and there are some famous compositions, such as Tú from Eduardo Sánchez de Fuentes, which has been recorded in many versions.

Versions of habanera-type compositions have appeared in the music of Ravel, Bizet, Saint-Saëns, Debussy, Fauré, and Albeniz. The rhythm is similar to that of the tango, and some believe the habanera is the musical father of the tango.

=== Danzón ===
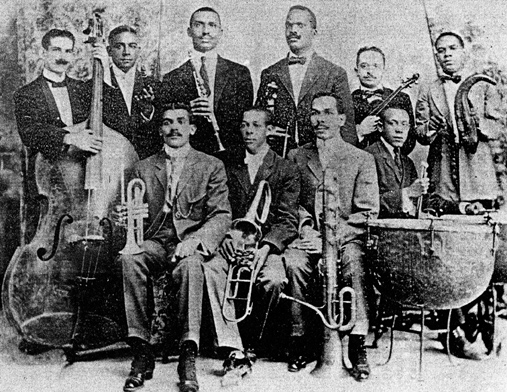
Orquesta Enrique Peña. Peña seated left, Barreto (violin) and Urfé (clarinet)

The European influence on Cuba's later musical development is represented by danzón, an elegant musical form that was once more popular than the Son in Cuba. It is a descendant of the creolized Cuban contradanza. The danzón marks the change from the communal sequence dance style of the late 18th century to the couple dances of later times. The stimulus for this was the success of the once-scandalous walz, where couples danced facing each other, independently from other couples and not as part of a pre-set structure. The danzón was the first Cuban dance to adopt such methods, though there is a difference between the two dances. The walz is a progressive ballroom dance where couples move round the floor in an anti-clockwise direction; the danzón is a 'pocket-handkerchief' dance where a couple stays within a small area of the floor.

The danzón was developed by Miguel Faílde in Matanzas, the official date of origin being 1879. Failde's was an orquesta típica, a form derived from military bands, using brass, kettle-drums etc. The later development of the charanga was more suited to the indoor salon and is an orchestral format still popular today in Cuba and some other countries. The charanga uses double bass, cello, violins, flute, piano, paila criolla and güiro. This change in instrumental set-up is illustrated in Early Cuban bands.

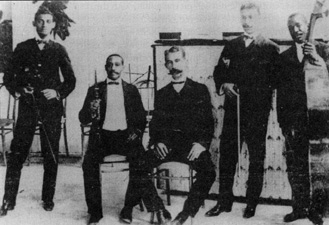
Charanga de Antonio (Papaíto) Torroella (1856–1934)

From time to time in its 'career', the danzón acquired African influences in its musical structure. It became more syncopated, especially in its third part. The credit for this is given to José Urfé, who worked elements of the son into the last part of the danzón in his composition El bombin de Barreto (1910). Both the danzón and the charanga line-up have been strongly influential in later developments.

The danzón was exported to popular acclaim throughout Latin America, especially Mexico. It is now a relic, both in music and in dance, but its highly orchestrated descendants live on in charangas that Faílde and Urfé would likely not recognize. Juan Formell has had a huge influence through his reorganization of first Orquesta Revé, and later Los Van Van.

=== Danzonete ===
Early danzóns were purely instrumental. The first to introduce a vocal part in a danzón was Aniceto Díaz (in 1927 in Matanzas), that was called Rompiendo la rutina, thereby creating a new genre called the danzonete. Later, the black singer Barbarito Diez joined the charanga of Antonio María Romeu in 1935 and, over the years, recorded eleven albums of danzonetes. All later forms of the danzón have included vocals.

== Musical theatre ==
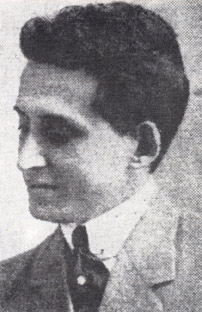
Adolfo Colombo

From the 18th century (at least) to modern times, popular theatrical formats used, and gave rise to, music and dance. Many famous composers and musicians had their careers launched in the theatres, and many famous compositions got their first airing on the stage. In addition to staging some European operas and operettas, Cuban composers gradually developed ideas that better suited their audience. Recorded music was to be the couduit for Cuban music to reach the world. The most recorded artist in Cuba up to 1925 was a singer at the Alhambra, Adolfo Colombo. Records show he recorded about 350 numbers between 1906 and 1917.

The first theatre in Havana opened in 1776. The first Cuban-composed opera appeared in 1807. Theatrical music was hugely important in the 19th century and the first half of the 20th century; its significance only began to wane with the change in political and social weather in the second part of the 20th century. Radio, which began in Cuba in 1922, helped the growth of popular music because it provided publicity and a new source of income for the artists.

=== Zarzuela ===
Zarzuela is a small-scale light operetta format. Starting off with imported Spanish content (List of zarzuela composers), it developed into a running commentary on Cuba's social and political events and problems. Zarzuela has the distinction of providing Cuba's first recordings: the soprano Chalía Herrera (1864–1968) made, outside Cuba, the first recordings by a Cuban artist. She recorded numbers from the zarzuela Cádiz in 1898 on unnumbered Bettini cylinders.

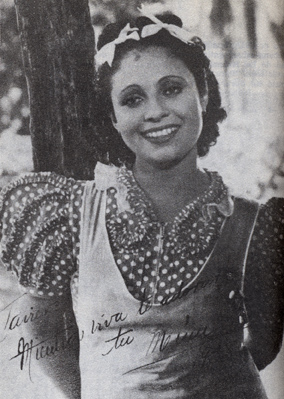
Rita Montaner in 1938 during shooting of El romance del palmar

Zarzuela reached its peak in the first half of the 20th century. A string of front-rank composers such as Gonzalo Roig, Eliseo Grenet, Ernesto Lecuona and Rodrigo Prats produced a series of hits for the Regina and Martí theatres in Havana. Great stars like the vedette Rita Montaner, who could sing, play the piano, dance and act, were the Cuban equivalents of Mistinguett and Josephine Baker in Paris. Some of the best known zarzuelas are La virgen morena (Grenet), La Niña Rita (Grenet and Lecuona), María la O, El batey, Rosa la China (all Lecuona); Gonzalo Roig with La Habana de noche; Rodrigo Prats with Amalia Batista and La perla del caribe; and above all, Cecilia Valdés (the musical of the most famous Cuban novel of the 19th century, with music by Roig and script by Prats and Agustín Rodríguez). Artists who were introduced to the public in the lyric theatre include Caridad Suarez, María de los Angeles Santana, Esther Borja and Ignacio Villa, who had such a round, black face that Rita Montaner called him Bola de Nieve ('Snowball').

Another famous singer was Maruja González Linares. Born from Spanish parents in the Mexican locality of Mérida, Yucatán in 1904, González travelled from Cuba to the US at a very young age. She studied vocal techniques in Cuba, where she made her debut in 1929 as a lyrical singer in the Company of Maestro Ernesto Lecuona. González performed in several theaters of Havana before going on a tour through the United States and, upon her return to Havana, she sang La Bayadere and The Merry Widow in the same city. At the beginning of the 1930s, she signed a number of contracts in Latin America and in Spain. She married Perico Suarez. The Cuban Revolution caught her abroad and she never returned to her country. She died in Miami in 1999.

=== Bufo theatre ===
Cuban bufo theatre is a form of comedy, ribald and satirical, with stock figures imitating types that might be found anywhere in the country. Bufo had its origin around 1800-15 as an older form, tonadilla, began to vanish from Havana. Francisco Covarrubias the 'caricaturist' (1775–1850) was its creator. Gradually, the comic types threw off their European models and became more and more creolized and Cuban. Alongside, the music followed. Argot from slave barracks and poor barrios found its way into lyrics that are those of the guaracha:

Una mulata me ha muerto!
Y no prenden a esa mulata?
Como ha de quedar hombre vivo
si no prenden a quien mata!

La mulata es como el pan;
se debe comer caliente,
que en dejandola enfriar
ni el diablo le mete el diente!^{p218}

(A mulata's done for me!
What's more, they don't arrest her!
How can any man live
If they don't take this killer?

A mulatta is like fresh bread
You gotta eat it while it's hot
If you leave it till it's cool
Even the devil can't get a bite!)

The "guaracha" occupied a predominant place within the development of vernacular theater in Cuba, which appearance at the beginning of the 19th century coincides with the emergence of the first autochthonous Cuban musical genres, the "guaracha" and the"contradanza.". Since 1812, Francisco Covarrubias (considered as the father of the Bufo Theater) gradually substituted in his theatrical pieces the typical characters of the Spanish "tonadilla escénica" with creole characters such as "guajiros", "monteros", "carreteros" or "peones". Those structural transformations were also associated to certain changes in the musical background of the pieces. Thus, the Spanish genres such as "jácaras", "tiranas", "boleras" or "villancicos", were substituted by "guarachas", "décimas" and "canciones cubanas."

=== Other theatrical forms ===
Vernacular theatre of various types often includes music. Formats rather like the British Music Hall, or the American Vaudeville, still occur, where an audience is treated to a potpourri of singers, comedians, bands, sketches and speciality acts. Even in cinemas during the silent movies, singers and instrumentalists appeared in the interval, and a pianist played during the films. Bola de Nieve and María Teresa Vera played in cinemas in their early days. Burlesque was also common in Havana before 1960.

== Rumba and guaracha ==
The word rumba is an abstract term that has been applied with different purposes to a wide variety of subjects for a very long time. From a semantic point of view, the term rumba is included in a group of words with similar meaning such as conga, milonga, bomba, tumba, samba, bamba, mambo, tambo, tango, cumbé, cumbia and candombe. All of them denote a Congolese origin due to the utilization of sound combinations such as, mb, ng and nd, that are typical of the Niger-Congo linguistic complex.

Maybe the most ancient and general of its meanings is that of a feast or "holgorio". As far as the second half of the 19th century, this word can be found used several times to represent a feast in a short story called "La mulata de rumbo", from the Cuban folklorist Francisco de Paula Gelabert: "I have more enjoyment and fun in a rumbita with those of my color and class", or "Leocadia was going to bed, as I was telling you, nothing less than at twelve noon, when one of his friends from the rumbas arrived, along with another young man that he wanted to introduce to her." According to Alejo Carpentier, "it is significant that the word rumba have passed to the Cuban language as a synonym of holgorio, lewd dance, merrymaking with low class women (mujeres del rumbo)."

As an example, In the case of the Yuka, Makuta and Changüí feasts in Cuba, as well as the Milonga and the Tango in Argentina, the word rumba was originally utilized to nominate a festive gathering; and after some time it was used to name the musical and dance genres that were played at those gatherings.

Among many others, some utilizations of the term "rumba" include a cover-all term for faster Cuban music which started in the early 1930s with "The Peanut Vendor". This term was replaced during the 1970s by salsa, which is also a cover-all term for marketing the Cuban music and other Hispano-Caribbean genres to non-Cubans. In the international Latin-American dance syllabus rumba is a misnomer for the slow Cuban rhythm more accurately called bolero-son.

Some scholars have pointed out that in reference to the utilization of the terms rumba and guaracha, there is possibly a case of synonymy, or the use of two different words to denominate the same thing. According to María Teresa Linares: "during the first years of the 20th century, there were used at the end of the vernacular (Bufo) theater plays some musical fragments that the authors sang, and that were called closing rumba (rumba final)" and she continues explaining that those (rumbas) "were certainly guarachas." The musical pieces used to close those plays may have been indistinctly called rumbas or guarachas, because those terms did not denote any generic or structural difference between them. Linares also said in reference to this subject: "Some recordings of guarachas and rumbas have been preserved that do not differentiate between them in the guitar parts – when it was a small group, duo or trio, or by the theater orchestra or a piano. The labels of the recordings stated: dialogue and rumba (diálogo y rumba)."

=== Urban rumba ===
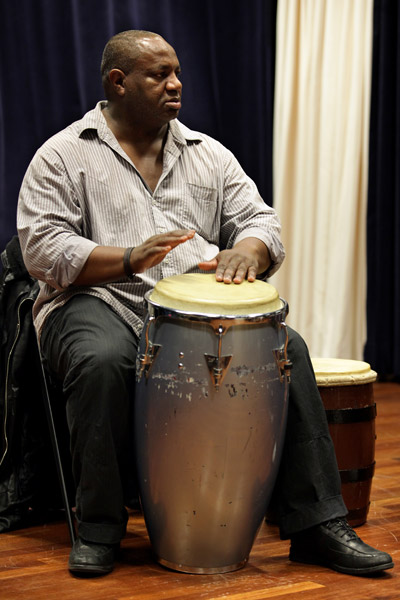
Rumba drummer

Urban rumba (also called Rumba (de solar o de cajón)) is an amalgamation of several African drumming and dance traditions, combined with Spanish influences. According to Cuban musicologist Argeliers León: "In the feast that constituted a rumba concurred, therefore, determined African contributions, but also converged other elements from Hispanic roots, that were already incorporated to the expressions that appeared in the new population emerging in the Island."

Rumba (de solar o de cajón) is a secular musical style from the docks and the less prosperous areas of Havana and Matanzas. At the beginning, rumba musicians used a trio of wooden boxes (cajones) to play, that were substituted later by drums, similar in appearance to conga drums. The treble drum is called "quinto", the midrange drum is called "macho or tres-dos" (three-two), because its essential rhythm is based on the Cuban clave pattern, and the bass drum is called "hembra o salidor," because it usually began or "broke in" (rompía) the rumba. In the rumba ensemble they also utilize two sticks or spoons to beat over a hollow piece of bamboo called "guagua" or "catá," as well as the Cuban claves, the Güiro and some rattles of bantu origin called "nkembi".

The vocal part of the rumba corresponds to a modified version of the ancient Spanish style of "copla-estribillo" (quatrain-refrain), including a "montuno" section that one may consider an expanded or developed "refrain" that constitute an independent section which include the call and response style, so typical of the African traditions.

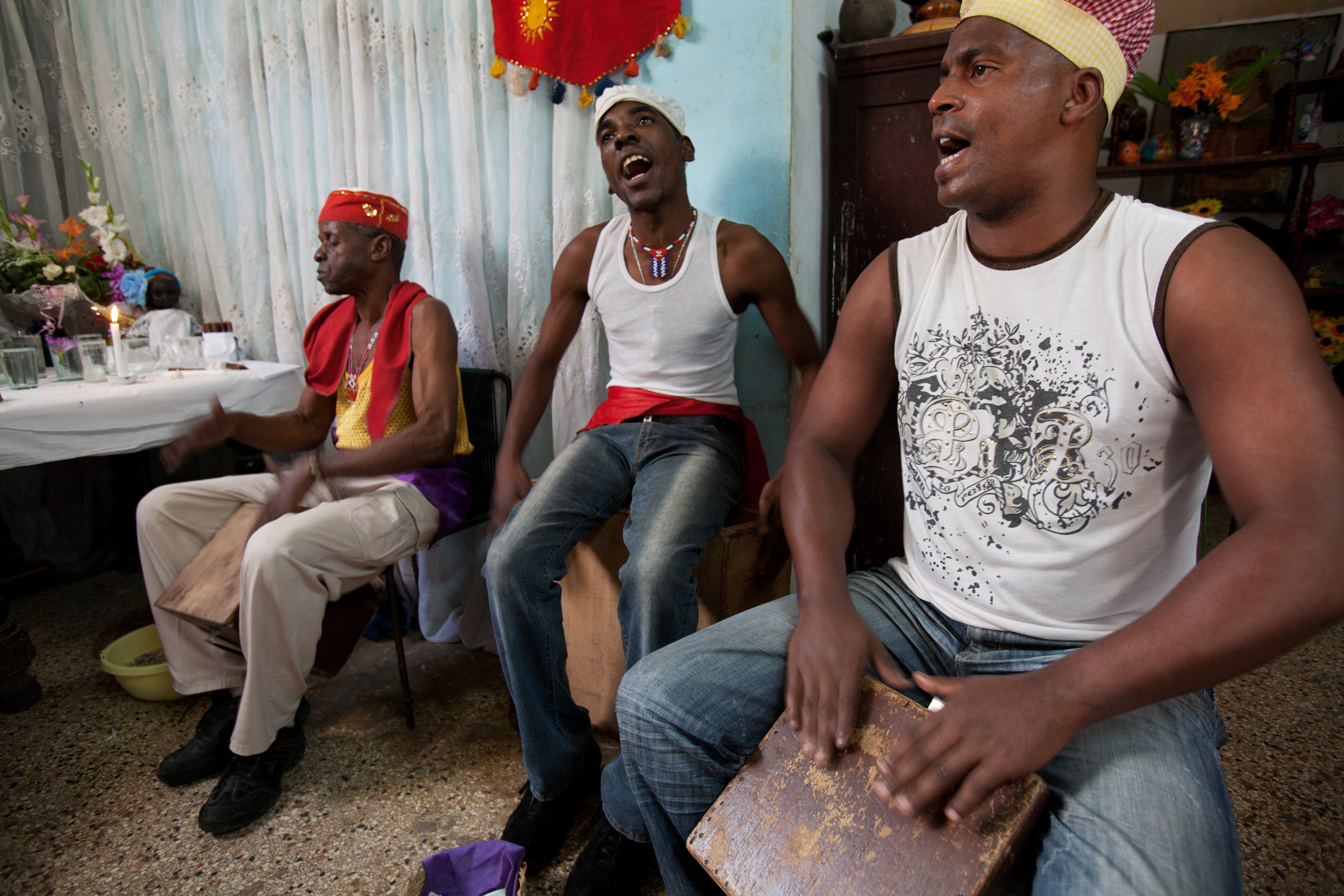
Rumba drummers

From the many rumba styles that began to appear during the end of the 19th century called "Spanish times" (Tiempo'españa), such as tahona, jiribilla, palatino and resedá, three basic rumba forms have survived: the Columbia, the guaguancó and the yambú. The Columbia, played in 6/8 time, is often as a solo dance performed only by a male performer. It is fast and includes aggressive and acrobatic moves. The guaguancó is danced by a pair of one man and one woman. The dance simulates the man's pursuit of the woman. The yambú, now a relic, featured a burlesque imitation of an old man walking with a stick. All forms of rumba are accompanied by song or chants.

Rumba (de solar o de cajón) is today a fossil genre usually seen in Cuba in performances of professional groups. There are also amateur groups based on Casas de Cultura (Culture Centers), and on work groups. Like all aspects of life in Cuba, dance and music are organised by the state through Ministries and their various committees.

=== Coros de Clave ===
Coros de Clave were popular choral groups that emerged at the beginning of the 20th century in Havana and other Cuban cities.

The Cuban government only allowed black people, slaves or free, to cultivate their cultural traditions within the boundaries of certain mutual aid societies, which were founded during the 16th century. According to David H. Brown, those societies, called Cabildos, "provided in times of sickness and death, held masses for deceased members, collected funds to buy nation-brethren out of slavery, held regular dances and diversions on Sundays and feast days, and sponsored religious masses, processions and dancing carnival groups (now called comparsas) around the annual cycle of Catholic festival days."

Within the Cabildos of certain neighborhoods from Havana, Matanzas, Sancti Spíritus and Trinidad, some choral groups were founded during the 19th century that organized competitive activities, and in some occasions were visited by local authorities and neighbors that gave them money and presents. Those choral societies were called Coros de Clave, probably after the instrument that used to accompany their performances, the Cuban Claves.

The accompaniment of the choirs also included a guitar and the percussion was executed over the sound box of an American banjo from which the strings were removed, due to the fact that African drums performance was strictly forbidden in Cuban cities. The style of the Coros de Clave music, and particularly its rhythm, originated later a popular song genre called Clave, which most probable served as the original prototype for the creation of the Criolla genre. Both genres, the Clave and the Criolla, became very popular within the Cuban vernacular theater repertoire.

=== Rural rumba ===
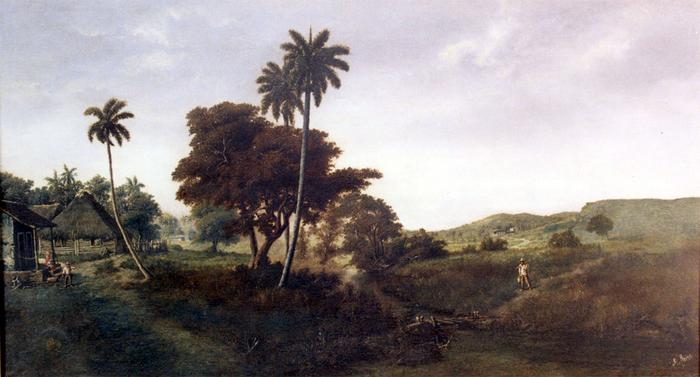
Cuban rural landscape

In a similar way as the first Spanish song-dances spread from the cities to the countryside, also the characteristics of the Cuban Guaracha, that enjoyed great popularity in Havana, began to spread to the rural areas in an undetermined time during the 19th century. This process was not difficult if one considers how close to one another the urban and the rural areas in Cuba were at that time. That was why the Cuban peasants (guajiros) began to include in their parties called "guateques" or "changüís", and in feasts such as the "fiestas patronales" (patron saint celebrations) and the "parrandas", some rumbitas (little rumbas) that were very similar to the urban Guarachas, which binary meter contrasted with the ternary beat of their traditional "tonadas" and "zapateos".

Those little rural rumbas have been called by renowned musicologist Danilo Orozco "proto-sones", "soncitos primigenios", "rumbitas", "nengones" or "marchitas," and some of them—such as Caringa, Papalote, Doña Joaquina, Anda Pepe and the Tingotalango—have been preserved until the present time.

The rumbitas were considered proto-sones (primeval Sones), because of the evident analogy that their structural components show with the Son, which emerged in Havana during the first decades of the 20th century. The rumbitas may be considered the original prototype of this popular genre.

According to musicologist Virtudes Feliú, those rumbitas appeared in cities and towns throughout the entire territory of the Island, such as: Ciego de Ávila, Sancti Espíritus, Cienfuegos, Camagüey, Puerta de Golpe in Pinar del Río and Bejucal in Havana, as well as Remedios in Villa Clara and Isla de Pinos (Pines Island).

There are many references to the Cuban Independence Wars (1868–1898), related to the rural rumbitas, in the Eastern region of the country as well as in the Western region and Isla de Pinos, which suggest that their emergence took place approximately during the second half of the 19th century.

The rural rumbitas included a greater number of African characteristics than the Cuban Guaracha, due to the gradual integration of free Afro-Cuban citizens to the rural environment.

Since the 16th century, thanks to a government-approved program called "manumisión", the black slaves were allowed to pay for their freedom with their own savings. Therefore, a larger number of free blacks were dedicated to the manual labors in the fields than in the cities, and some of them were also able to become proprietaries of land and slaves.

==== Characteristics of the rural rumba ====
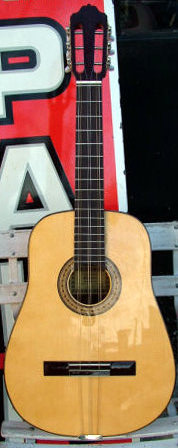
Tres cubano

One of the most salient characteristics of the rural rumbitas was its own form, very similar to the African typical song structure. In this case, the entire piece was based on a single musical fragment or phrase of short duration that was repeated, with some variations, time and time again, often alternating with a choir. This style was called "montuno" (literally "from the countryside") due to its rural origin.

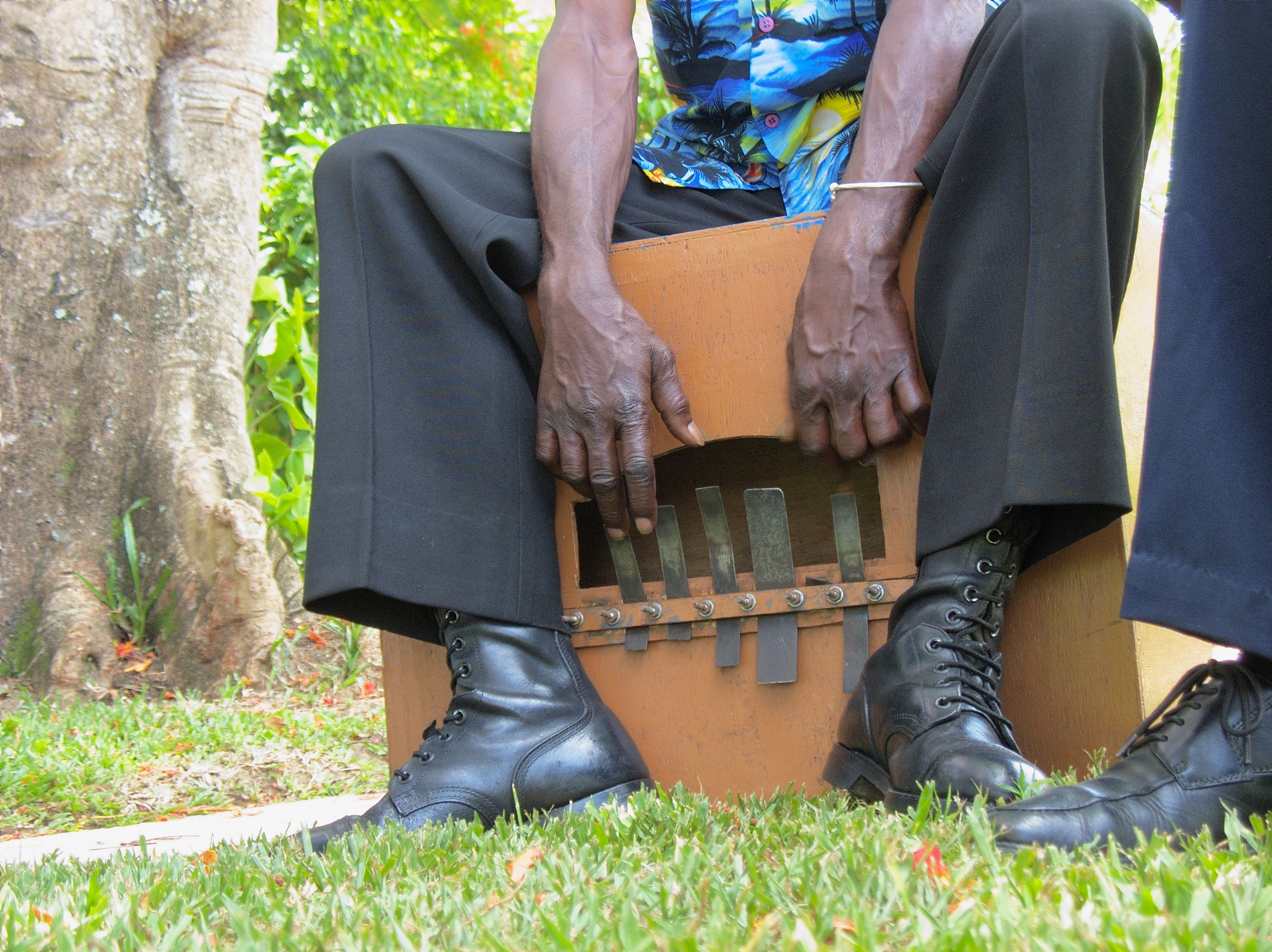
Marímbula

Another characteristic of the new genre was the superposition of different rhythmic patterns simultaneously executed, similar to the way it is utilized in the Urban Rumba, which is also a common trait of the African musical tradition. Those layers or "franjas de sonoridades", according to Argeliers León, were assigned to different instruments that were gradually incorporated into the group. Therefore, the ensemble grew from the traditional Tiple and Güiro, to one that included guitar, "bandurria", Cuban lute, claves, and other instruments such as the "tumbandera", the "marímbula", the "botija", the bongoes, the common "machete" (cutlass) and the accordion.

Some important musical functions were assigned to the sonority layers, such as the "time line" or clave rhythm performed by the claves, a "1 eighth note + 2 sixteenth notes" rhythm played by the güiro or the machete, the patterns of the "guajeo" by the tres, the improvisation on the bongoes and the anticipated bass on the "tumbandera" or the "botija".

=== Guaracha ===
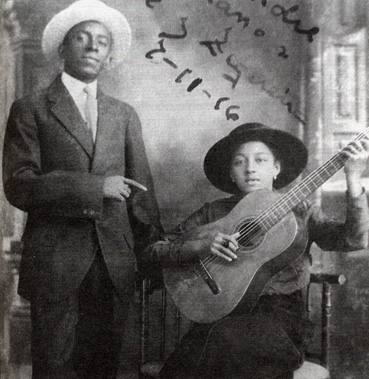
María Teresa Vera & Rafael Zequeira

On January 20, 1801, Buenaventura Pascual Ferrer published a note in a newspaper called El Regañón de La Habana, in which he refers to certain chants that "run outside there through vulgar voices". Between them he mentioned a "guaracha" named "La Guabina", about which he says: "in the voice of those that sings it, tastes like any thing dirty, indecent or disgusting that you can think about." At a later undetermined date, "La Guabina" appears published between the first musical scores printed in Havana at the beginning of the 19th century.

From the commentaries published in El Regañón de La Habana, it can be concluded that those "guarachas" were very popular within the Havana population at that time, because in the same previously mentioned article the author says: "but most importantly, what bothers me most is the liberty with which a number of chants are sung throughout the streets and town homes, where innocence is insulted and morals offended ... by many individuals, not just of the lowest class, but also by some people that are supposed to be called well educated." Therefore, it can be said that those audacious "guarachas" were apparently already sung within a wide social sector of the Havana population.

According to Alejo Carpentier (quoting Buenaventura Pascual Ferrer), at the beginning of the 19th century there were held in Havana up to fifty dance parties every day, where the famous "guaracha" was sung and danced, among other popular pieces.

The guaracha is a genre of rapid tempo and comic or picaresque lyrics. It originated at the end of the 18th century, and during the early 20th century was still often played in the brothels and other places in Havana. The lyrics were full of slang, and dwelt on events and people in the news. Rhythmically, guaracha exhibits a series of rhythm combinations, such as 6/8 with 2/4.

Many of the early trovadores, such as Manuel Corona (who worked in a brothel area of Havana), composed and sang guarachas as a balance for the slower boleros and canciones. The satirical lyric content also fitted well with the son, and many bands played both genres. In the mid-20th century the style was taken up by the conjuntos and big bands as a type of up-tempo music. Today it seems no longer to exist as a distinct musical form; it has been absorbed into the vast maw of salsa. Singers who can handle the fast lyrics and are good improvisors are called guaracheros or guaracheras.

== 19th-century popular music ==
=== Proto-son ===
The origin of the Cuban son can be traced to the rural rumbas, called proto-sones (primeval sones) by musicologist Danilo Orozco. They show, in a partial or embryonic form, all the characteristics that later would identify the son style: The repetition of a phrase called montuno, the clave pattern, a rhythmic counterpoint between different layers of the musical texture, the guajeo from the Tres, the rhythms from the guitar, the bongoes and the double bass and the call-and-response style between soloist and choir.

According to Radamés Giro, later the refrain (estribillo) or montuno was tied to a quatrain (cuarteta – copla) called regina, which was how the peasants from the Eastern side of the country called the quatrain. In this way, the structure refrain–quatrain–refrain appears at a very early stage in the Son Oriental, like in one of the most ancient Sones called "Son de Máquina" (Machine Son), which comprises three reginas with its correspondent refrains.

During an investigative project about the Valera-Miranda family (old Soneros) conducted by Danilo Orozco in the region of Guantánamo, he recorded a sample of Nengón, which is considered an ancestor of the Changüí. It shows the previously mentioned refrain–quatrain–refrain structure. In this case, the several repetitions of the refrain constitute a true "montuno".

Refrain: Yo he nacido para ti nengón, yo he nacido para ti nengón, yo he nacido para ti Nengón... (I was born for you Nengón...)

==== Nengón ====
The "Nengón" is considered a Proto-Son, precursor of the Changüí and also of the Oriental Son. Its main characteristic is the alternance of improvised verses between a soloist and a choir. The Nengón is played with Tres, Guitar, Güiro and Tingotalango or Tumbandera.

==== Changüí ====
Changüí is a type of son from the eastern provinces (area of Santiago de Cuba and Guantánamo), formerly known as Oriente. It shares relevant characteristics with the Oriental Son in regard to rhythms, instruments and choral refrains; and at the same time it shows certain original elements.

Changüí exists today in the form of dozens of small groups, mostly from Guantanamo province. The instrumentation is similar to that of the early Son groups who set up in Havana before 1920. These son groups, for example, the early Sexteto Boloña and Sexteto Habanero, used either marimbulas or botijas as bass instruments before they changed over to the double bass, musically a more flexible instrument.

Changui is a partner dance practiced by residents of the Guantanamo Province with its own distinctive social dance form (couple dance). Guantanameros engage in Changui at various celebrations, parties, concerts and festivals.

Some modern orchestras, such as Orquesta Revé, have claimed Changüí as their main influence. Whether this is accurate, or not, is unclear.

==== Sucu-Sucu ====
We can also find in Isla de Pinos, at the opposite Western side of the Island a primeval Proto-Son called Sucu-Sucu, which also shows the same structure of the Oriental Proto-Sones. According to Maria Teresa Linares, In the Sucu-Sucu the music is similar to a Son Montuno in its formal, melodic, instrumental and harmonic structure. A soloist alternates with a choir and improvises on a quatrain or a "décima." The instrumental section is introduced by the Tres, gradually joined by the other instruments. The introduction of eight measures is followed by the refrain by the choir that alternates with the soloist several times.

An urban legend claims that the name "Sucu Sucu" came from the grandmother of one of the local musicians in la Isla de Juventud. The band was playing in the patio, and the dances were dancing while shuffling their feet on the sandy floor. The grandmother came out of the house to say "Please stop making noise with all that sucu sucu," referring to the sound of shuffling feet on a sandy floor. The legend claim that the name stuck, and the music the dancers were dancing too started to be named "Sucu Sucu".

=== Trova ===
In the 19th century, Santiago de Cuba became the focal point of a group of itinerant musicians, troubadours, who moved around earning their living by singing and playing the guitar. They were of great importance as composers, and their songs have been transcribed for all genres of Cuban music

Pepe Sánchez, born José Sánchez (1856–1918), is known as the father of the trova style and the creator of the Cuban bolero. He had no formal training in music. With remarkable natural talent, he composed numbers in his head and never wrote them down. As a result, most of these numbers are now lost for ever, though some two dozen or so survive because friends and disciples transcribed them. His first bolero, Tristezas, is still remembered today. He also created advertisement jingles before radio was born. He was the model and teacher for the great trovadores who followed him.

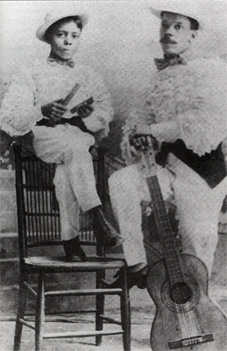
Guarionex & Sindo Garay

The first, and one of the longest-lived, was Sindo Garay (1867–1968). He was an outstanding composer of trova songs, and his best have been sung and recorded many times. Garay was also musically illiterate – in fact, he only taught himself the alphabet at 16 – but in his case not only were scores recorded by others, but there are recordings. Garay settled in Havana in 1906, and in 1926 joined Rita Montaner and others to visit Paris, spending three months there. He broadcast on radio, made recordings and survived into modern times. He used to say "Not many men have shaken hands with both José Martí and Fidel Castro!"^{p298}

José 'Chicho' Ibáñez (1875–1981) was even longer-lived than Garay. Ibáñez was the first trovador to specialize in the son; he also sang guaguancós and pieces from the abakuá.

The composer Rosendo Ruiz (1885–1983) was another long-lived trovador. He was the author of a well-known guitar manual. Alberto Villalón (1882–1955), and Manuel Corona (1880–1950) were of similar stature. Garay, Ruiz, Villalón and Corona are known as the four greats of the trova, though the following trovadores are also highly regarded.

Patricio Ballagas (1879–1920); María Teresa Vera (1895–1965), Lorenzo Hierrezuelo (1907–1993), Ñico Saquito (Antonio Fernandez: 1901–1982), Carlos Puebla (1917–1989) and Compay Segundo (Máximo Francisco Repilado Muñoz: 1907–2003) were all great trova musicians. El Guayabero (Faustino Oramas: 1911–2007) was the last of the old trova.

Trova musicians often performed in pairs and trios, while others later joined the larger sexteto, septeto and conjunto ensembles. Compay Segundo was among the musicians associated with this format. Trio Matamoros was another prominent ensemble associated with trova.

==== Bolero ====
This is a song and dance form quite different from its Spanish namesake. It originated in the last quarter of the 19th century with the founder of the traditional trova, Pepe Sánchez. He wrote the first bolero, Tristezas, which is still sung today. The bolero has always been a staple of the trova musician's repertoire.

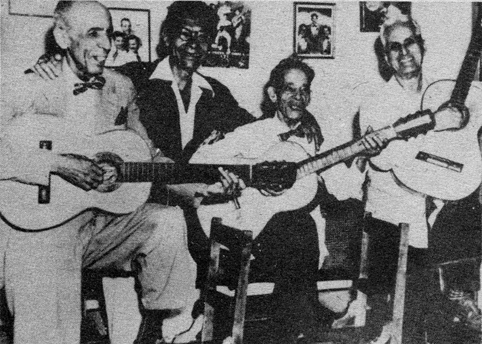
Rosendo Ruiz, Manuel Corona, Sindo Garay & Alberto Villalon

Originally, there were two sections of 16 bars in 2/4 time separated by an instrumental section on the Spanish guitar called the pasacalle. The bolero proved to be exceptionally adaptable, and led to many variants. Typical was the introduction of syncopation, leading to the bolero-moruno, bolero-beguine, bolero-mambo, and bolero-cha. The bolero-son became for several decades the most popular rhythm for dancing in Cuba, and it was this rhythm that the international dance community picked up and taught as the wrongly named 'rumba'.

The Cuban bolero was exported all over the world, and is still popular. Leading composers of the bolero were Sindo Garay, Rosendo Ruiz, Carlos Puebla, and Agustín Lara (Mexico).

==== Canción ====
Canción means 'song' in Spanish. It is a popular genre of Latin American music, particularly in Cuba, where many of the compositions originate. Its roots lie in Spanish, French and Italian popular song forms. Originally highly stylized, with "intricate melodies and dark, enigmatic and elaborate lyrics" The canción was democratized by the trova movement in the latter part of the 19th century, when it became a vehicle for the aspirations and feelings of the population. Canción gradually fused with other forms of Cuban music, such as the bolero.

=== Tropical waltz ===
The waltz (El vals) arrived in Cuba by 1814. It was the first dance in which couples were not linked by a communal sequence pattern. It was, and still is, danced in 3/4 time with the accent on the first beat. It was originally thought scandalous because couples faced each other, held each other in the 'closed' hold, and, so to speak, ignored the surrounding community. The waltz entered all countries in the Americas; its relative popularity in 19th-century Cuba is hard to estimate.

Indigenous Cuban dances did not use the closed hold with couples dancing independently until the danzón later in the century, though the guaracha might be an earlier example. The waltz has another characteristic: it is a 'travelling' dance, with couples moving round the arena. In Latin dances, progressive movement of dancers is unusual, but does occur in the conga, the samba and the tango.

The Tropical waltz was performed in a slower tempo and frequently included a sung melody with a text. Those texts usually referred to the beauties of the Cuban countryside, the longing of the Siboneyes (an Indigenous people of Cuba) and other creole themes. With accents on its three beats, its melody was fluid and composed of equal value notes. It was similar to many other songs in which the melody was treated in a syllabic way, where the first beat was not stressed by a brief anacrusis but had a tendency to move toward the second beat like in the peasant (guajiro) song.

=== Son ===
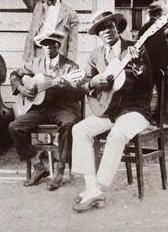
Guitar and Tres

Son cubano is a style of music and dance that originated in Cuba and gained worldwide popularity during the 1930s. Son combines the structure and traits of the Spanish canción with Afro-Cuban stylistic and percussion instruments elements. The Cuban Son is one of the most influential and widespread forms of Latin American music: its derivatives and fusions, especially salsa, have spread across the world.

The Son, said Cristóbal Díaz, is the most important genre of Cuban music, and the least studied. It can fairly be said that son is to Cuba what the tango is to Argentina, or the samba to Brazil. In addition, it is perhaps the most flexible of all forms of Latin-American music. Its great strength is its fusion between European and African musical traditions. Its most characteristic instruments are the Cuban instrument known as the tres, and the well-known double-headed bongó; these are present from the start to the present day. Also typical are the claves, the Spanish guitar, the double bass (replacing the early botija or marímbula), early on the cornet or trumpet and finally the piano.

In spite of a traditional tendency to attribute the origin of Cuban Son to the Eastern region of Cuba (Oriente), most recently, some musicologists have shown a more inclusive stance. Although Alejo Carpentier, Emilio Grenet and Cristóbal Díaz Ayala support the "Eastern origin" theory, Argeliers León does not mention anything about it in his pivotal work "Del Canto y el Tiempo", as well as María Teresa Linares in "The Music between Cuba and Spain." Ramadamés Giro states about this subject: "If Son was an artistic phenomenon that was developing since the second half of the 19th century – and not just in the old Oriente (Eastern) province -, it is logical to suppose, but not to affirm, that long before 1909 it was heard in the Capital City (Havana) because of the aforementioned reasons."

It was in Havana where the encounter of the rural rumba and the urban rumba, that had been developing separately during the second half of the 19th century, took place. The guaracheros and rumberos that used to play with the Tiple and the Guiro finally met other Rumberos that sang and danced accompanied by the wooden box (cajón) and the Cuban Clave, and the result was the fusion of both styles in a new genre called Son. Around 1910 the Son most likely adopted the clave rhythm from the Havana-based rumba, which had been developed in the late 19th century in Havana and Matanzas.

The mass popularization of Son music led to an increased valorization of Afro-Cuban street culture and of the artists who created it. It also opened the door for other music genres with Afro-Cuban roots to become popular in Cuba and throughout the world.

== 20th- and 21st-century popular music ==
=== Cuban jazz ===
The history of jazz in Cuba was obscured for many years, but it has become clear that its history in Cuba is virtually as long as its history in the US.

Much more is now known about early Cuban jazz bands, but a full assessment is plagued by the lack of recordings. Migrations and visits to and from the US and the mutual exchange of recordings and sheet music kept musicians in the two countries in touch. In the first part of the 20th century, there were close relations between musicians in Cuba and those in New Orleans. The orchestra leader in the famous Tropicana Club, Armando Romeu Jr, was a leading figure in the post–World War II development of Cuban jazz. The phenomenon of cubop and the jam sessions in Havana and New York organized by Cachao created genuine fusions that influence musicians today.

A key historian of early Cuban jazz is Leonardo Acosta. Others have explored the history of jazz and Latin jazz more from the U.S. perspective.

==== Early Cuban jazz bands ====
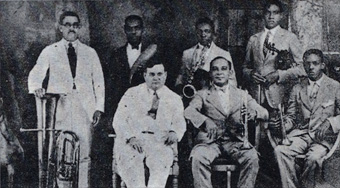
Jazz Band Sagua, 1920s

The Jazz Band Sagua was founded in Sagua la Grande in 1914 by Pedro Stacholy (director & piano). Members: Hipólito Herrera (trumpet); Norberto Fabelo (cornet); Ernesto Ribalta (flute & sax); Humberto Domínguez (violin); Luciano Galindo (trombone); Antonio Temprano (tuba); Tomás Medina (drum kit); Marino Rojo (güiro). For fourteen years they played at the Teatro Principal de Sagua. Stacholy studied under Antonio Fabré in Sagua, and completed his studies in New York, where he stayed for three years.

The Cuban Jazz Band was founded in 1922 by Jaime Prats in Havana. The personnel included his son Rodrigo Prats on violin, the great flautist Alberto Socarrás on flute and saxophone and Pucho Jiménez on slide trombone. The line-up would probably have included double bass, kit drum, banjo, cornet at least. Earlier works cited this as the first jazz band in Cuba, but evidently there were earlier groups.

In 1924 Moisés Simons (piano) founded a group which played on the roof garden of the Plaza Hotel in Havana, and consisted of piano, violin, two saxes, banjo, double bass, drums and timbales. Its members included Virgilio Diago (violin); Alberto Soccarás (alto saz, flute); José Ramón Betancourt (tenor sax); Pablo O'Farrill (d. bass). In 1928, still at the same venue, Simons hired Julio Cueva, a famous trumpeter, and Enrique Santiesteban, a future media star, as vocalist and drummer. These were top instrumentalists, attracted by top fees of $8 a day.^{p28}

During the 1930s, several bands played Jazz in Havana, such as those of Armando Romeu, Isidro Pérez, Chico O'Farrill and Germán Lebatard. Their most important contribution was its own instrumental format itself, which introduced the typical Jazz sonority to the Cuban audience. Another important element within this process were the arrangements of Cuban musicians such as Romeu, O'Farrill, Bebo Valdés, Peruchín Jústiz and Leopoldo "Pucho" Escalante.

=== Afro-Cuban jazz ===
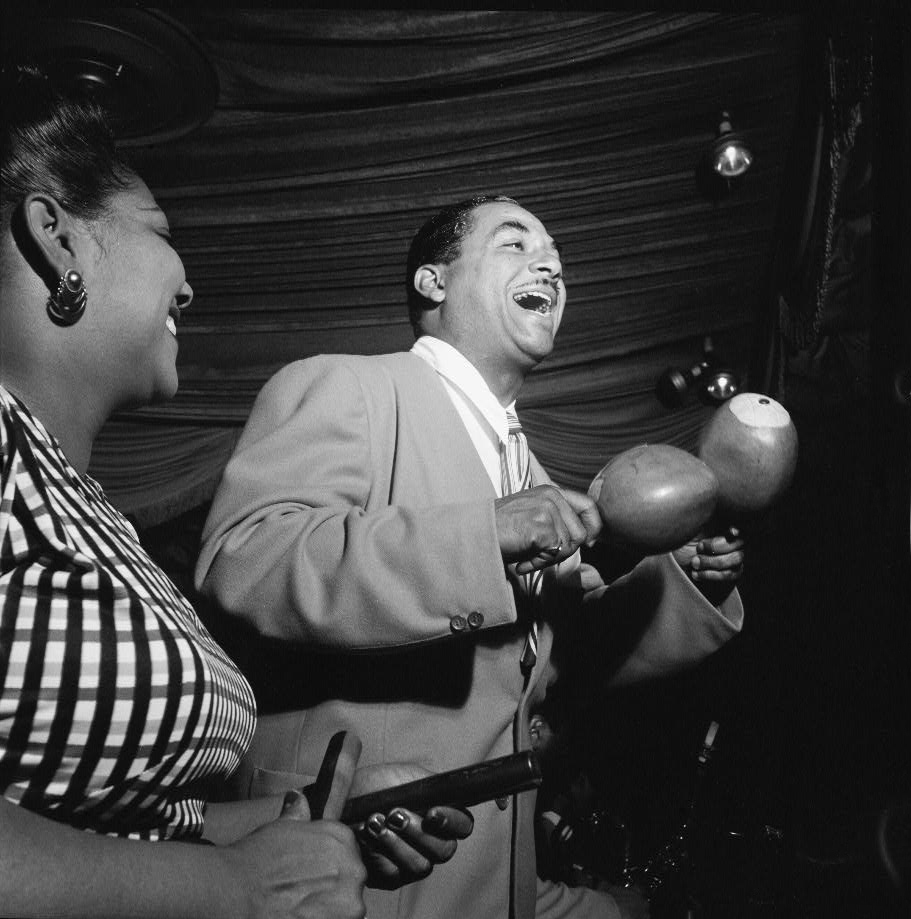
Machito and his sister Graciella Grillo

Afro-Cuban jazz is the earliest form of Latin jazz and mixes Afro-Cuban clave-based rhythms with jazz harmonies and techniques of improvisation. Afro-Cuban jazz first emerged in the early 1940s, with the Cuban musicians Mario Bauza and Frank Grillo "Machito" in the band Machito and his Afro-Cubans, based in New York City. In 1947 the collaborations of bebop innovator Dizzy Gillespie with Cuban percussionist Chano Pozo brought Afro-Cuban rhythms and instruments, most notably the tumbadora and the bongo, into the East Coast jazz scene. Early combinations of jazz with Cuban music, such as Dizzy's and Pozo's "Manteca" and Charlie Parker's and Machito's "Mangó Mangüé", were commonly referred to as "Cubop", short for Cuban bebop. During its first decades, the Afro-Cuban jazz movement was stronger in the United States than in Cuba itself. In the early 1970s, the Orquesta Cubana de Música Moderna and later Irakere brought Afro-Cuban jazz into the Cuban music scene, influencing new styles such as songo.

=== Diversification and popularization ===
==== Cuban music enters the United States ====
In 1930, Don Azpiazú had the first million-selling record of Cuban music: The Peanut Vendor (El Manisero), with Antonio Machín as the singer. This number had been orchestrated and included in N.Y. theatre by Azpiazú before recording, which no doubt helped with the publicity. The Lecuona Cuban Boys became the best-known Cuban touring ensemble: they were the ones who first used the conga drum in their conjunto, and popularized the conga as a dance. Xavier Cugat at the Waldorf Astoria was highly influential. In 1941 Desi Arnaz popularized the comparsa drum (similar to the conga) in the U.S with his performances of Babalú. There was a real 'rumba craze' at the time. Later, Mario Bauza and Machito set up in New York and Miguelito Valdés also arrived there.

=== 1940s and 1950s ===
In the 1940s, Chano Pozo formed part of the bebop revolution in jazz, playing conga with Dizzy Gillespie and Machito in New York City. Cuban jazz had started much earlier, in Havana, in the period 1910–1930.

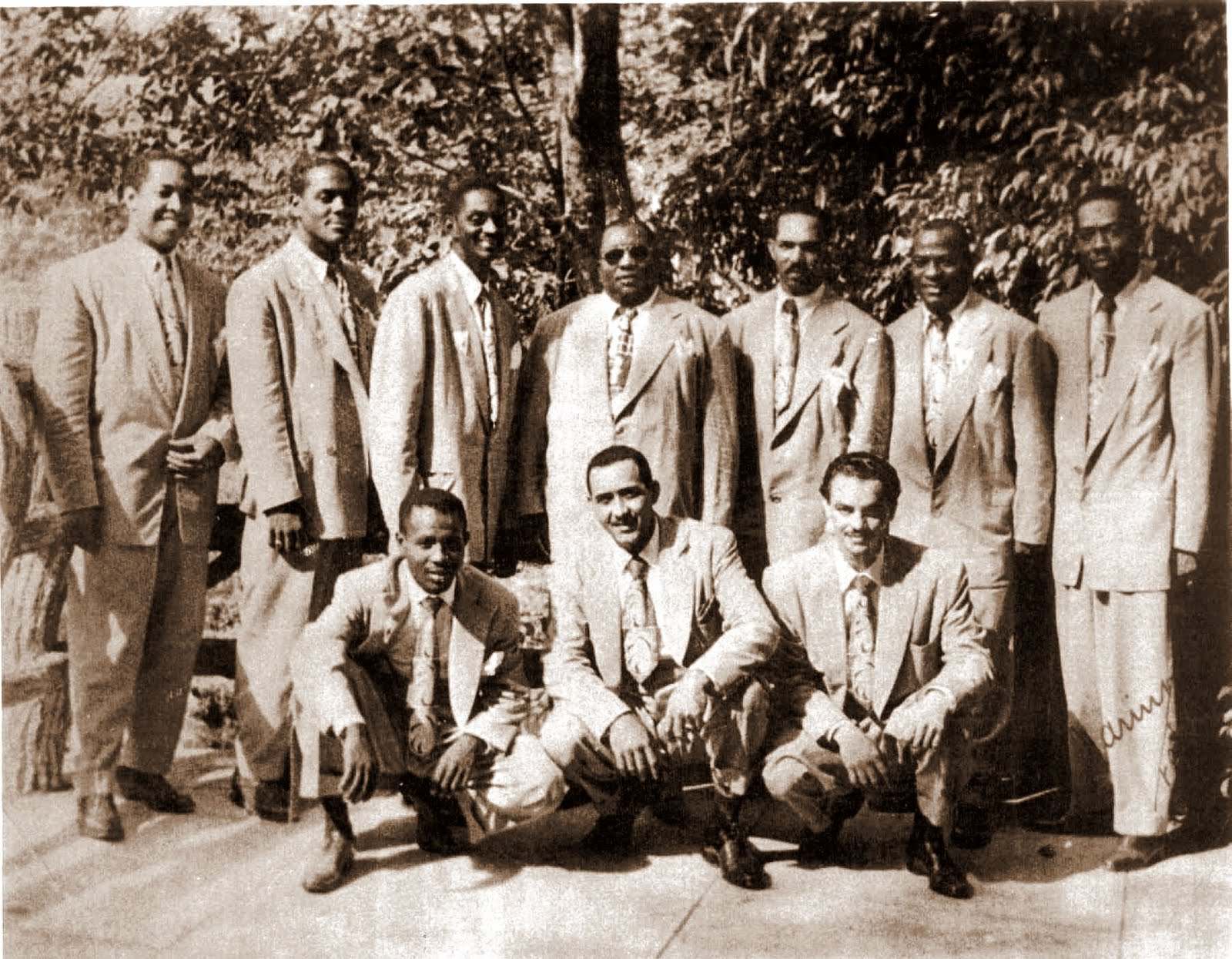
Conjunto of Arsenio Rodríguez

Arsenio Rodríguez, one of Cuba's most famous tres players and conjunto leaders, emphasised the son's African roots by adapting the guaguancó style, and by adding a cowbell and conga to the rhythm section. He also expanded the role of the tres as a solo instrument.

In the late 1930s and '40s, the danzonera Arcaño y sus Maravillas incorporated more syncopation and added a montuno (as in son), transforming the music played by charanga orchestras.

==== Big band era ====
The big band era arrived in Cuba in the 1940s, and became a dominant format that survives. Two great arranger-bandleaders deserve special credit for this, Armando Romeu Jr. and Damaso Perez Prado. Armando Romeu Jr. led the Tropicana Cabaret orchestra for 25 years, starting in 1941. He had experience playing with visiting American jazz groups as well as a mastery of Cuban forms of music. In his hands the Tropicana presented not only Afrocuban and other popular Cuban music, but also Cuban jazz and American big band compositions. Later he conducted the Orquesta Cubana de Musica Moderna.

Damaso Perez Prado had a number of hits, and sold more 78s than any other Latin music of the day. He took over the role of pianist/arranger for the Orquesta Casino de la Playa in 1944, and immediately began introducing new elements into its sound. The orchestra began to sound more Afrocuban, and at the same time Prado took influences from Stravinsky, Stan Kenton and elsewhere. By the time he left the orchestra in 1946 he had put together the elements of his big band mambo.: "Above all, we must point out the work of Perez Prado as an arranger, or better yet, composer and arranger, and his clear influence on most other Cuban arrangers from then on."^{p86}

Benny Moré, considered by many the greatest Cuban singer of all time, was in his heyday in the 1950s. He had an innate musicality and fluid tenor voice, which he colored and phrased with great expressivity. Although he could not read music, Moré was a master of all the genres, including son montuno, mambo, guaracha, guajira, cha cha cha, afro, canción, guaguancó, and bolero. His orchestra, the Banda Gigante, and his music, was a development – more flexible and fluid in style – of the Perez Prado orchestra, which he sang with in 1949–1950.

==== Cuban music in the US ====
Three great innovations based on Cuban music hit the US after World War II: the first was Cubop, the latest Latin jazz fusion. In this, Mario Bauza and the Machito orchestra on the Cuban side and Dizzy Gillespie on the American side were prime movers. The rumbustious conguero Chano Pozo was also important, for he introduced jazz musicians to basic Cuban rhythms. Cuban jazz has continued to be a significant influence.

The mambo first entered the United States around 1950, though ideas had been developing in Cuba and Mexico City for some time. The mambo as understood in the United States and Europe was considerably different from the danzón-mambo of Orestes "Cachao" Lopez, which was a danzón with extra syncopation in its final part. The mambo—which became internationally famous—was a big-band product, the work of Perez Prado, who made some sensational recordings for RCA in their new recording studios in Mexico City in the late 1940s. About 27 of those recordings had Benny Moré as the singer, though the best sellers were mainly instrumentals. The big hits included "Que rico el mambo" (Mambo Jambo); "Mambo No. 5"; "Mambo #8"; "Cherry Pink (and Apple Blossom White)". The later (1955) hit "Patricia" was a mambo/rock fusion. Mambo of the Prado kind was more a descendant of the son and the guaracha than the danzón. In the U.S. the mambo craze lasted from about 1950 to 1956, but its influence on the bugaloo and salsa that followed it was considerable.

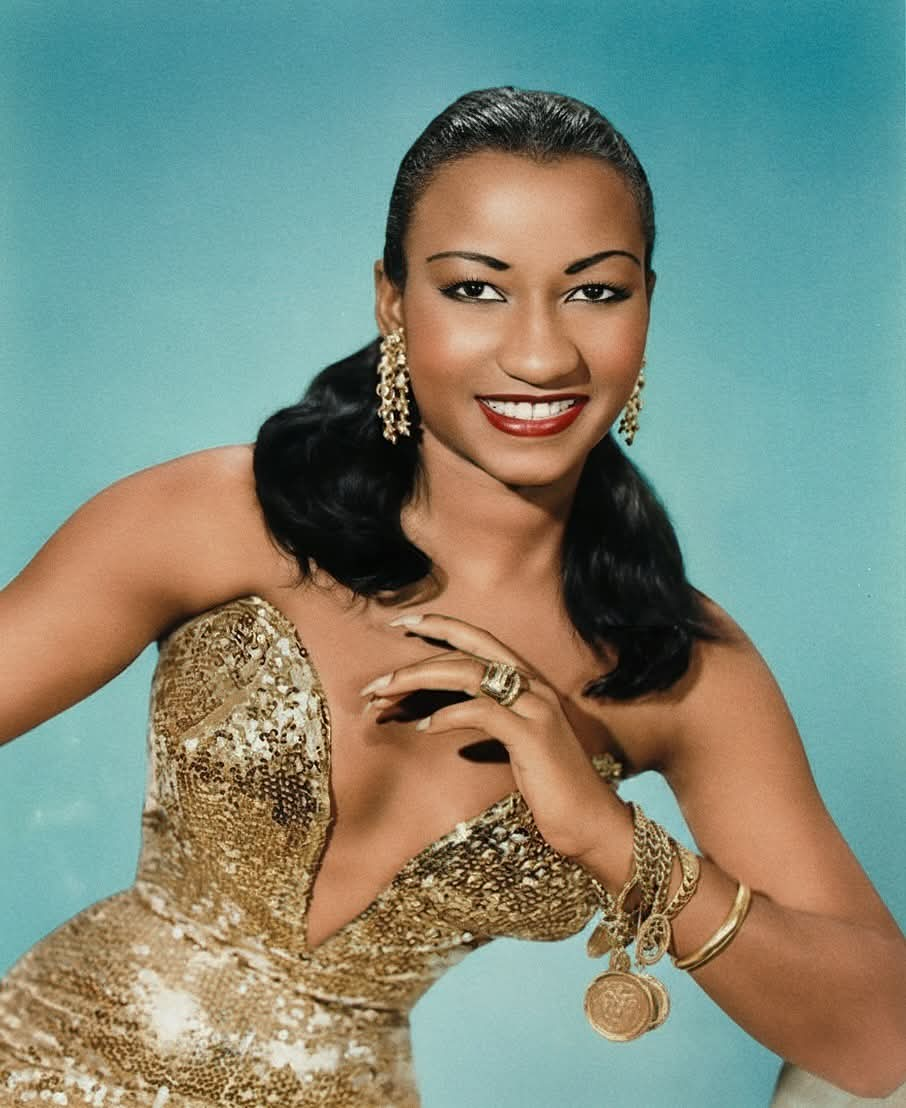
Celia Cruz

Violinist Enrique Jorrín invented the chachachá in the early 1950s. This was developed from the danzón by increased syncopation. The chachachá became more popular outside Cuba when the big bands of Perez Prado and Tito Puente produced arrangements that attracted American and European audiences.

Along with "Nuyoricans" Ray Barretto and Tito Puente and others, several waves of Cuban immigrants introduced their ideas into US music. Among these was Celia Cruz, a guaracha singer. Others were active in Latin jazz, such as percussionist Patato Valdés of the Cuban-oriented "Tipíca '73", linked to the Fania All-Stars. Several former members of Irakere have also become highly successful in the US, among them Paquito D'Rivera and Arturo Sandoval. Tata Güines, a famous conguero, moved to New York City in 1957, playing with jazz players such as Dizzy Gillespie, Maynard Ferguson, and Miles Davis at Birdland. As a percussionist, he performed with Josephine Baker and Frank Sinatra. He returned to Cuba in 1959 after Fidel Castro came to power in the Cuban Revolution, which he helped fund with contributions from his earnings as a musician.

=== Mambo ===
Mambo is a musical genre and dance style that developed originally in Cuba. The word "mambo", similar to other Afroamerican musical denominations as conga, milonga, bomba, tumba, samba, bamba, bamboula, tambo, tango, cumbé, cumbia and candombe, denotes an African origin, particularly from Congo, due to the presence of certain characteristic combinations of sounds, such as mb, ng and nd, which belong to the Niger-Congo linguistic complex.

The earliest roots of the Cuban mambo can be traced to the "Danzón de Nuevo Ritmo" (Danzón with a new rhythm) made popular by the orchestra "Arcaño y sus Maravillas" conducted by famous bandleader Antonio Arcaño. He was the first to denominate a section of the popular Cuban Danzón as a "mambo." It was Arcaño's cellist, Orestes López, who created the first danzón called "Mambo" (1938). In this piece, some syncopated motives, taken from the Son style, were combined with improvised flute passages.

Pianist and arranger from Matanzas, Cuba, Dámaso Pérez Prado (1927) established his residence in Havana at the beginning of the 1940s and began to work at night clubs and orchestras, such as Paulina Alvarez's and Casino de La Playa. In 1949 he traveled to Mexico looking for job opportunities and achieved great success with a new style, to which he assigns a name that had been already utilized by Antonio Arcaño, the "Mambo."

Perez Prado's style differed from the previous "mambo" concept. The new style possessed a greater influence from the North American jazz band music, and an expanded instrumentation consisting of four or five trumpets, four of five saxophones, double bass, drum set, maracas, cowbell, congas and bongoes. The new "mambo" included a catchy counterpoint between the trumpets and the saxophones, that impulsed the body to move along with the rhythm, stimulated at the end of each musical phrase by a characteristic deep throat sound expression.

Prado's recordings were meant for the Latin American and U.S. Latino markets, but some of his most celebrated mambos, such as "Mambo No. 5" and "Que Rico el Mambo", quickly crossed over to the United States.

=== Chachachá ===
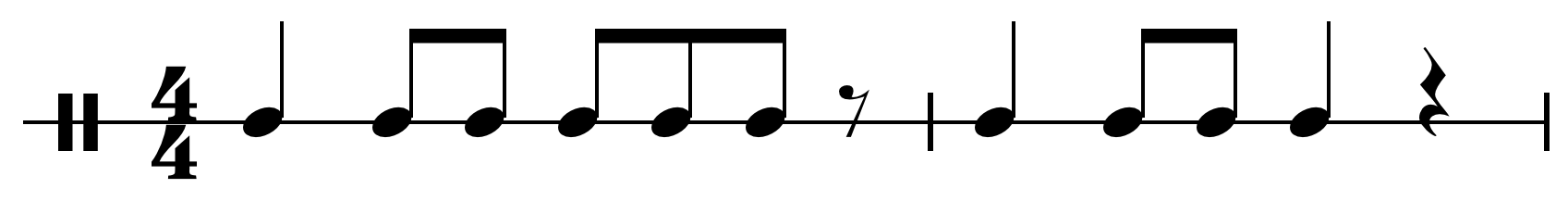
Cha-Cha rhythm.

Chachachá is a genre of Cuban music. It has been a popular dance music which developed from the Danzón-mambo in the early 1950s, and became widely popular throughout the entire world.

Chachachávis a Cuban music genre whose creation has been traditionally attributed to Cuban composer and violinist Enrique Jorrín, which began his career playing for the charanga band Orquesta América.

According to the testimony of Enrique Jorrín, he composed some "Danzones" in which the musician of the orchestra had to sing short refrains, and this style was very successful. In the danzón "Constancia" he introduced some montunos and the audience was motivated to join in singing the refrains. Jorrín also asked the members of the orchestra to sing in unison so the lyrics may be heard more clearly and achieve a greater impact in the audience. That way of singing also helped to mask the poor singing skills of the orchestra members.

Since its inception, chachachá music had a close relationship with the dancer's steps. The well-known name chachachá came into being with the help of the dancers at the Silver Star Club in Havana. When the dance was coupled to the rhythm of the music, it became evident that the dancer's feet were making a peculiar sound as they grazed the floor on three successive beats. It was like an onomatopoeia that sounded as: chachachá. From this peculiar sound, a music genre was born which motivated people from around the world to dance to its catchy rhythm.

Typical piano accompaniment to a cha-cha-chá (Orovio 1981:132)

According to Olavo ALén: "During the 1950s, Chachachá maintained its popularity thanks to the efforts of many Cuban composers who were familiar with the technique of composing danzones and who unleashed their creativity on the Chachachá", such as Rosendo Ruiz, Jr. ("Los Marcianos" and "Rico Vacilón"), Félix Reina ("Dime Chinita," "Como Bailan Cha-cha-chá los Mexicanos"), Richard Egűes ("El Bodeguero" and "La Cantina") and Rafael Lay ("Cero Codazos, Cero Cabezazos").

The chachachá was first presented to the public through the instrumental medium of the charanga, a typical Cuban dance-band format made up of a flute, strings, piano, bass and percussion. The popularity of the chachachá also revived the popularity of this kind of orchestra.

=== Filin ===
Filin was a Cuban fashion of the 1940s and 1950s, influenced by popular music in the US. The word is derived from feeling. It describes a style of post-microphone jazz-influenced romantic song (crooning). Its Cuban roots were in the bolero and the canción. Some Cuban quartets, such as Cuarteto d'Aida and Los Zafiros, modelled themselves on U.S. close-harmony groups. Others were singers who had heard Ella Fitzgerald, Sarah Vaughan and Nat King Cole. A house in Havana, where the trovador Tirso Díaz lived, became a meeting-place for singers and musicians interested in filin such as: Luis Yañez, César Portillo de la Luz, José Antonio Méndez, Niño Rivera, José Antonio Ñico Rojas, Elena Burke, Froilán, Aida Diestro and Frank Emilio Flynn. Here lyricists and singers could meet arrangers, such as Bebo Valdés, El Niño Rivera (Andrés Hechavarria), Peruchín (Pedro Justiz), and get help to develop their work. Filin singers included César Portillo de la Luz, José Antonio Méndez, who spent a decade in Mexico from 1949 to 1959, Frank Domínguez, the blind pianist Frank Emilio Flynn, and the great singers of boleros Elena Burke and the still-performing Omara Portuondo, who both came from the Cuarteto d'Aida. The filin movement originally had a place every afternoon on Radio Mil Diez. Some of its most prominent singers, such as Pablo Milanés, later took up the banner of the Nueva Trova.

=== 1960s and 1970s ===
Modern Cuban music is known for its relentless mixing of genres. For example, the 1970s saw Los Irakere use batá in a big band setting; this became known as son-batá or batá-rock. Later artists created the mozambique, which mixed conga and mambo; and batá-rumba, which mixed rumba and batá drum music. Mixtures including elements of hip hop, jazz and rock and roll are also common, like in Habana Abierta's rockoson.

==== Revolutionary Cuba and Cuban exiles ====
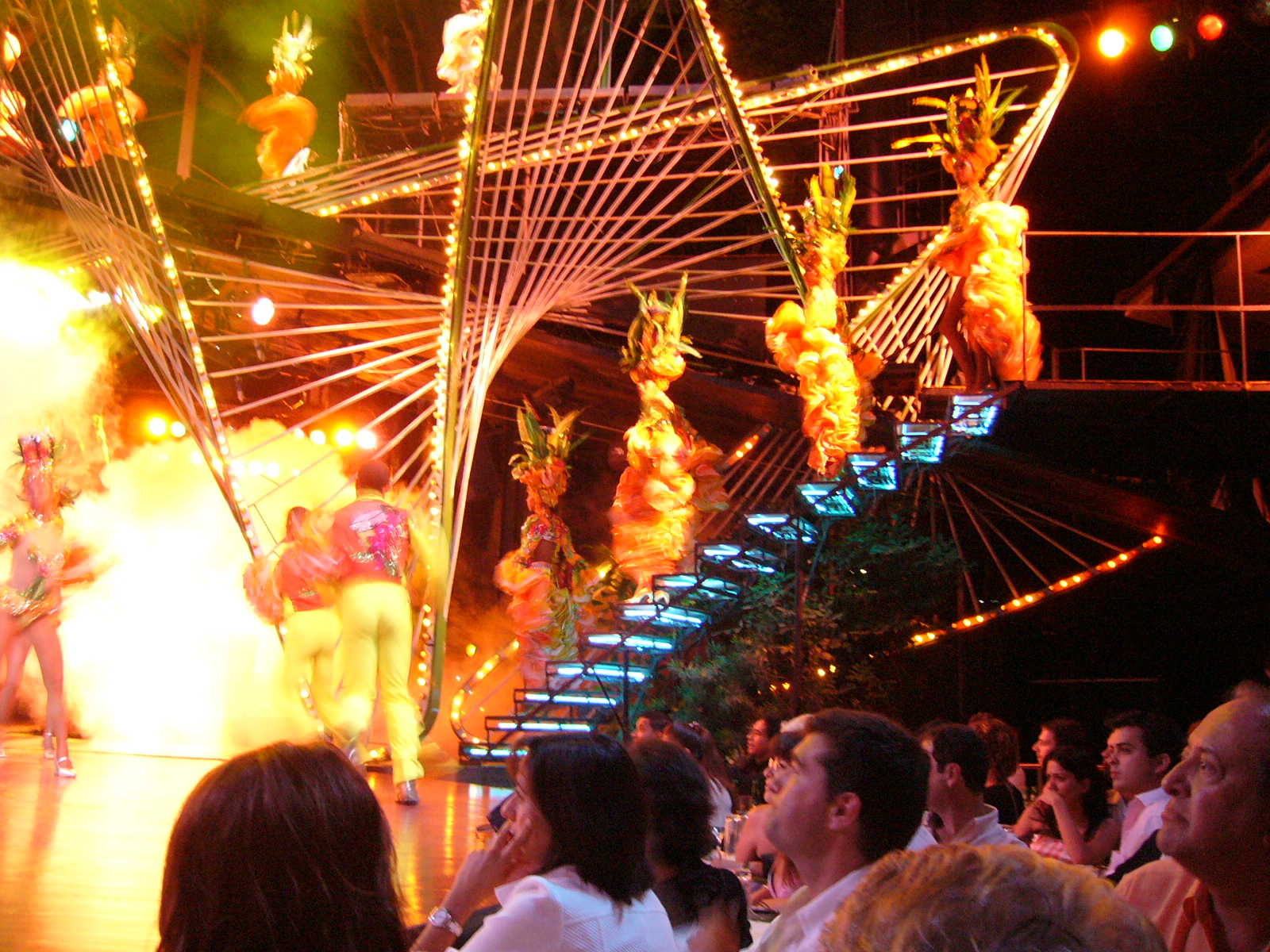
Tropicana stage

The triumph of the Cuban Revolution in 1959 signalled the emigration of many musicians to Puerto Rico, Florida and New York, and in Cuba artists and their work came under the protection (and control) of the Socialist state, and the monopoly state-owned recording company EGREM. The Castro government abolished copyright laws in Cuba, closed many of the venues where popular music used to be played (e.g. night clubs), and so indirectly threw many musicians out of work.^{p202} This undoubtedly had deleterious effects on the evolution of popular music and dance.

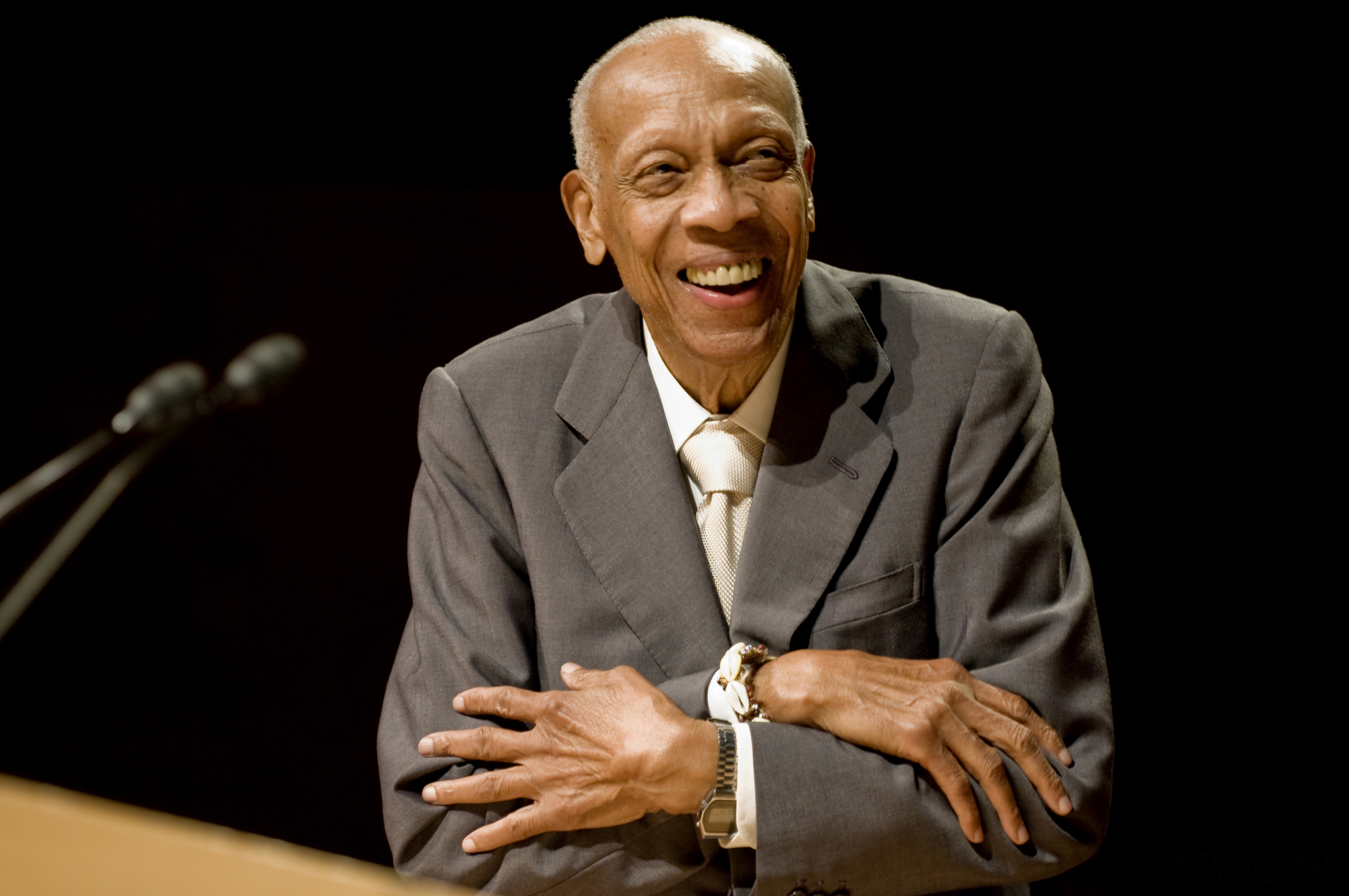
Pianist Bebo Valdés

Many young musicians now studied classical music and not popular music. All musicians employed by the state were given academic courses in music. In Cuba, the Nueva Trova movement (including Pablo Milanés) reflected the new leftist ideals. The state took over the lucrative Tropicana Club, which continued as a popular attraction for foreign tourists until 1968, when it was closed along with many other music venues (and later reopened with the rebirth of tourism). ^{p202} Tourism was almost non-existent for three decades. Traditional Cuban music could be found in local Casas de la Trova. Musicians, if in work, were full-time and paid by the state after graduating from a conservatory. The collapse of the USSR in 1991, and the loss of its support for Cuba changed the situation quite a bit. Tourism became respectable again, and so did popular music for their entertainment. Musicians were even allowed to tour abroad and earn a living outside the state-run system.

Famous artists from the Cuban exile include Celia Cruz and the whole conjunto she sang with, the Sonora Matancera. 'Patato' (Carlos Valdes), Cachao, La Lupe, Arturo Sandoval, Willy Chirino, Hansel y Raul, La Palabra, Paquito D'Rivera, Bebo Valdés and Gloria Estefan are some others. Many of these musicians, especially Cruz, became closely associated with the anti-revolutionary movement, and as 'unpersons' have been omitted from the standard Cuban reference books, and their subsequent musical recordings are never on sale in Cuba.

==== Salsa ====
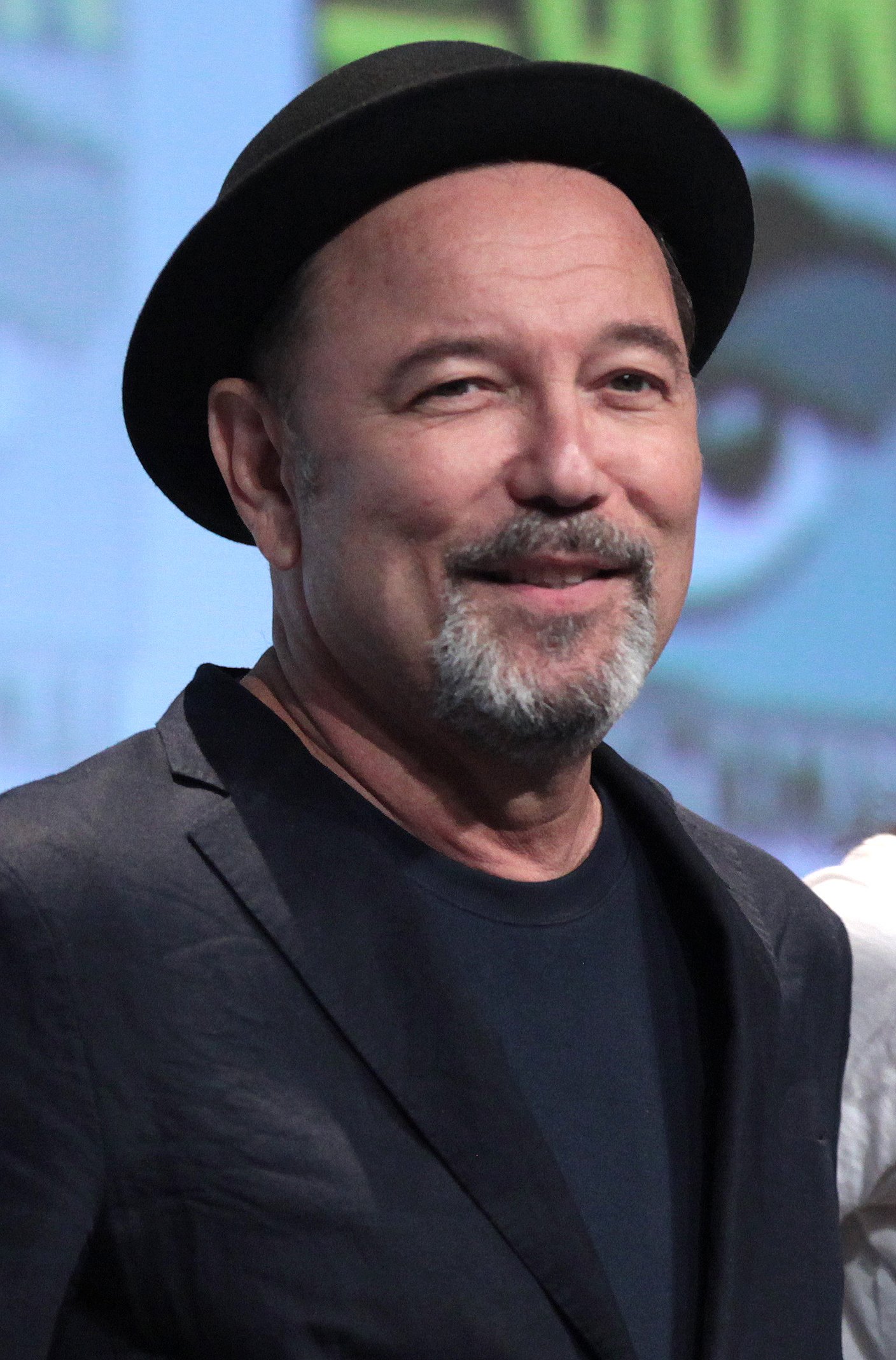
Rubén Blades

Salsa was the fourth innovation based on Cuban music to hit the US, and differed in that it was initially developed in the US, not in Cuba. Because Cuba has so many indigenous types of music there has always been a problem in marketing the 'product' abroad to people who did not understand the differences between rhythms that, to a Cuban, are quite distinct. So, twice in the 20th century, a kind of product label was developed to solve this problem. The first occasion was in the 1930s after "The Peanut Vendor" became an international success. It was called a 'rumba' even though it really had nothing to do with genuine rumba: the number was obviously a son pregon. The label 'rumba' was used outside Cuba for years as a catch-all for Cuban popular music.

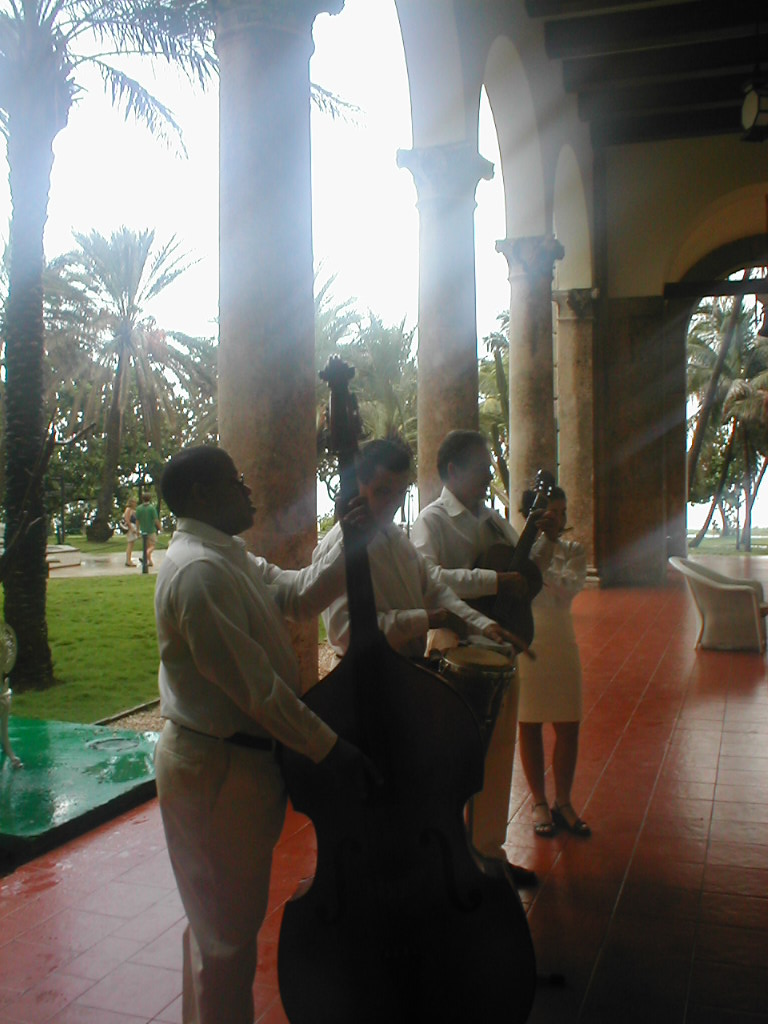
Musicians at the Hotel Nacional, Havana. October 2002

The second occasion happened during the period 1965–1975 in New York City, as musicians of Cuban and Puerto-Rican origin combined to produce the great music of the post Cha-cha-cha period. This music acquired the label of 'salsa'. No-one really knows how this happened, but everyone recognised what a benefit it was to have a common label for son, mambo, guaracha, guajira, guaguancó, etc. Cubans and non Cubans, such as Tito Puente, Rubén Blades and many experts of the Cuban music and salsa, have always said "Salsa is just another name for Cuban, music. Tito Puentes once said, now they call it Salsa, later they may call it Stir Fry, but to me it will alway be Cuban Music"; but over time salsa bands worked in other influences. For example, in the late 1960s Willie Colón developed numbers that made use of Brazilian rhythms. New York radio programmes offered 'salsarengue' as a further combination. A band of the 1940s playing Cuban music uses the same exact instruments as salsa music. Later still 'Salsa romantica' was the label for an especially sugary type of bolero. Even when, Benny Moré, Perez Prado the greatest Sonero that ever existed, was singing boleros with a salsa cadence in the 1940s. It was not until the 1950s that Cuban music became popular for Puerto Rican bands. Plena, Bomba and other styles of music were popular at the time in Puerto Rico. Many famous Puerto Rican musicians went to learn the music styles of Cubans in the 1930s and 1940s, and it was not until the arrival of Castro in 1959 and the Cuban music stopped its exportation to the world, that Puerto Ricans in New York were able to be greatly noticed, but what is known as salsa today was brought to New York in the 1920s and 1930s by Dizzy Gillespie and Chano Pozo, this last one was discovered by Dizzy Gillespie as he was one of the greatest percussionists that ever lived.

The question of whether or not salsa is anything more than Cuban music has been argued for more than thirty years. Initially, not much difference could be seen. Later it became clear that not only was New York salsa different from popular music in Cuba, but salsa in Venezuela, Colombia and other countries could also be distinguished. It also seems clear that salsa has receded from the great position it achieved in the late 1970s. The reasons for this are also much disputed.

==== Nueva trova ====
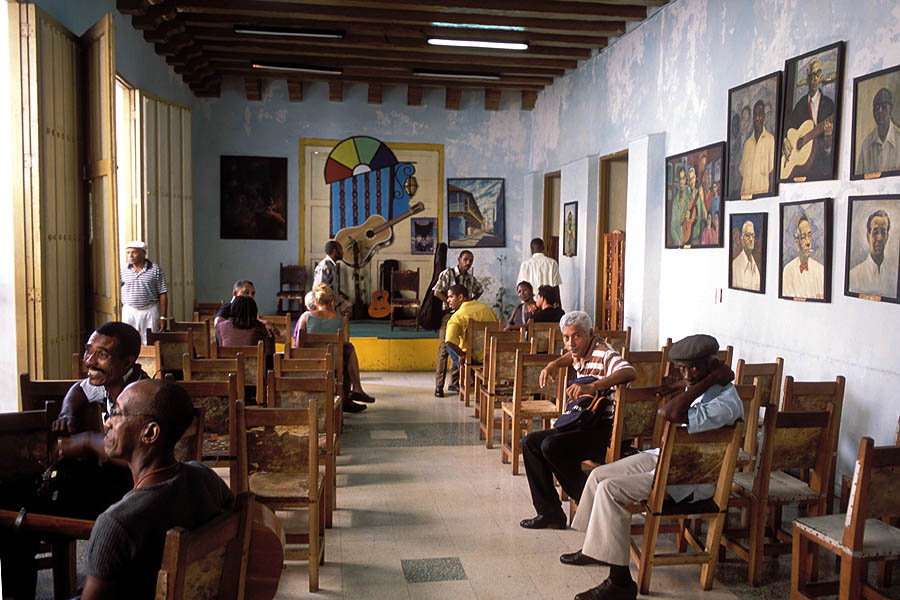
A local musical house, Casa de la Trova, at Santiago de Cuba

Paralleling nueva canción in Latin America is the Cuban nueva trova, which dates from about 1967/68, after the Cuban Revolution. It differed from the traditional trova, not because the musicians were younger, but because the content was, in the widest sense, political. Nueva trova is defined by its connection with Castro's revolution, and by its lyrics, which attempt to escape the banalities of life by concentrating on socialism, injustice, sexism, colonialism, racism and similar issues. Silvio Rodríguez and Pablo Milanés became the most important exponents of this style. Carlos Puebla and Joseíto Fernández were long-time old trova singers who added their weight to the new regime, but of the two only Puebla wrote special pro-revolution songs.

Nueva trova had its heyday in the 1970s, but was already declining before the fall of the Soviet Union. Examples of non-political styles in the nueva trova movement can be found, for example, Liuba María Hevia whose lyrics are focused on more traditional subjects such as love and solitude, sharing with the rest a highly poetical style. On the other side of the spectrum, Carlos Varela is famous in Cuba for his open criticism of some aspects of Castro's revolution.

By the late 20th century, nueva trova, had declined in prominence both within Cuba and internationally, while the success of the Buena Vista Social Club film and recordings brought renewed international attention to older forms of Cuban music. The topical and political themes associated with neuva trova were particularly characteristic of the 1960s and 1970s. Songs from the movement including Carlos Puebla's "Hasta siempre, Comandante", have remained part of the Cuban musical repertoire.

=== 1980s to the present ===
Son remains the basis of most popular forms of modern Cuban music. Son is represented by long-standing groups like Septeto Nacional, which was re-established in 1985, Orquesta Aragón, Orquesta Ritmo Oriental and Orquesta Original de Manzanillo. Sierra Maestra, is famous for having sparked a revival in traditional son in the 1980s. Nueva trova still has influence, but the overtly political themes of the 1960s are well out of fashion. Meanwhile, Irakere fused traditional Cuban music with jazz, and groups like NG La Banda, Orishas and Son 14 continued to add new elements to son, especially hip hop and funk, to form timba music; this process was aided by the acquisition of imported electronic equipment. There are still many practitioners of traditional son montuno, such as Eliades Ochoa, who have recorded and toured widely as a result of interest in the son montuno after the Buena Vista Social Club success. Europe-based Cuban female singer-songwriter Addys Mercedes merged her roots of Son and Filin with elements of urban, rock and pop-music, reaching mainstream airplay charts in Germany.

In the 1990s, increased interest in world music coincided with the post-Soviet Union periodo especial in Cuba, during which the economy began opening up to tourism. Orquesta Aragón, Charanga Habanera and Cándido Fabré y su Banda have been long-time players in the charanga scene, and helped form the popular timba scene of the late 1990s. The biggest award in modern Cuban music is the Beny Moré Award.

==== Timba ====
Cubans have never been content to hear their music described as salsa, even though it is crystal clear that this was a label for their music. Since the early 1990s Timba has been used to describe popular dance music in Cuba, rivaled only lately by Reggaetón. Though derived from the same roots as salsa, Timba has its own characteristics, and is intimately tied to the life and culture of Cuba, and especially Havana.

As opposed to salsa, whose roots are strictly from Son and the Cuban conjunto bands of the 1940s and 1950s, Timba represents a synthesis of many folkloric (rumba, guaguancó, batá drumming and the sacred songs of santería.), and popular sources (even taking inspiration from non Afro Cuban musical genres such as rock, jazz and funk). According to Vincenzo Perna, author of Timba: The Sound of the Cuban Crisis, timba needs to be spoken of because of its musical, cultural, social, and political reasons; its sheer popularity in Cuba, its novelty and originality as a musical style, the skill of its practitioners, its relationship with both local traditions and the culture of the black Diaspora, its meanings, and the way its style brings to light the tension points within society. In addition to timbales, timba drummers make use of the drum-set, further distinguishing the sound from that of mainland salsa. The use of synthesised keyboard is also common. Timba songs tend to sound more innovative, experimental and frequently more virtuosic than salsa pieces; horn parts are usually fast, at times even bebop influenced, and stretch to the extreme ranges of all instruments. Bass and percussion patterns are similarly unconventional. Improvisation is commonplace.

==== Revival projects ====
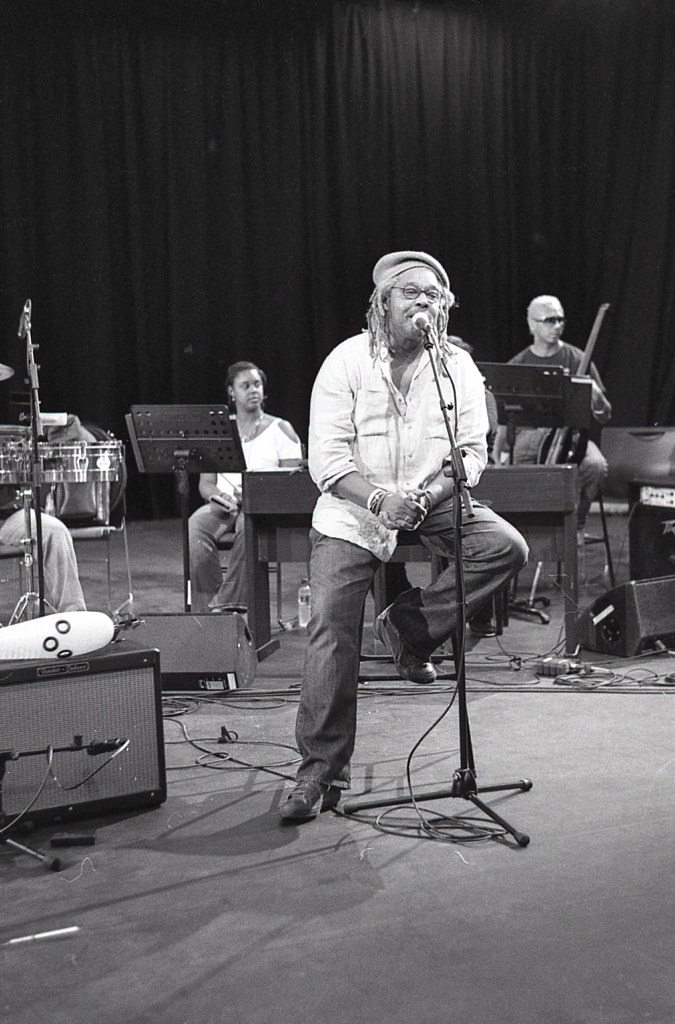
Cuban bandleader and musician Juan de Marcos González

Several projects gained international attention in the 1990s due to their revival of traditional music styles such as the son cubano of the septeto and the conjunto era. Founded in 1976, Sierra Maestra (band) was one of the first revivalist groups in Cuba. In 1995, Juan de Marcos González, director and tres player of Sierra Maestra, was contacted by Nick Gold (head of World Circuit Records) to record a traditional Cuban album featuring African musicians. In the end, the African musicians could not make it to Havana, so the project became a 100% Cuban affair featuring veteran Cuban musicians such as Rubén González, Ibrahim Ferrer, Compay Segundo and Omara Portuondo. It spawned two bands, both of which involved American guitarist Ry Cooder: Afro-Cuban All Stars and Buena Vista Social Club. Both bands recorded their debut albums, A Toda Cuba le Gusta and Buena Vista Social Club, respectively, in March 1996. The release of the latter in September 1997 was a true watershed event. The album became a worldwide hit, selling millions of copies and turning established musicians into globally renowned figures.

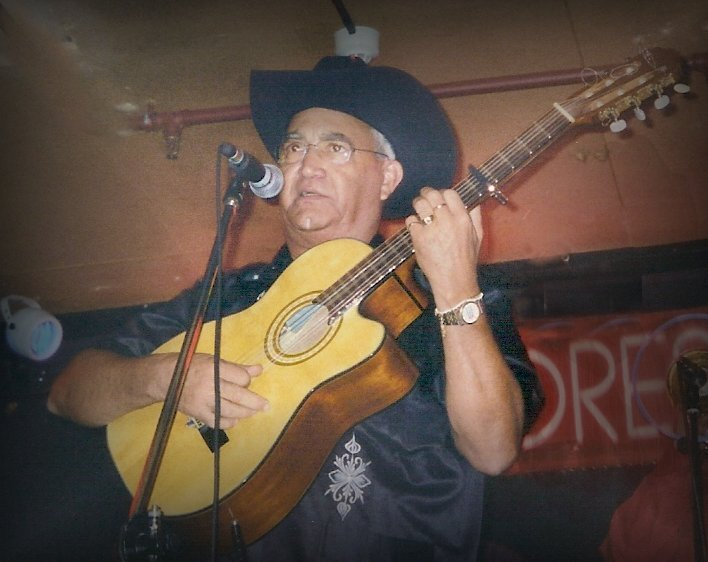
Guitarist Eliades Ochoa

Buena Vista resulted in several follow-up recordings and spawned a film of the same name, as well as tremendous interest in other Cuban groups. In subsequent years, dozens of singers and conjuntos made recordings for foreign labels and toured internationally.

The conclusion some have drawn is that the wholesale closure of popular music venues (after the revolution), which threw many musicians out of work, and subsequent control by state committees, damaged the development of Cuban popular music.

==== Hip hop ====
Hip hop grew steadily more popular in Cuba in the 1980s and 1990s through Cuba's Special Period. After the collapse of the Soviet Union, the Cuban economy went into decline. Poverty became more widespread and visible in Cuba. In the 1990s, some Cubans started to protest this situation by means of rap and hip-hop. During this period of economic crisis, which the country's poor and black populations especially hard, hip hop became a way for the country's Afro-descended population to embrace their blackness and articulate a demand for racial equality for black people in Cuba. The idea of blackness and black liberation was not always compatible with the goals of the Cuban government, which was still operating under the idea that a raceless society was the correct realization of the Cuban Revolution. When hip-hop emerged, the Cuban government opposed the vulgar image that rappers portrayed, but later accepted that it might be better to have hip-hop under the influence of the Ministry of Culture as an authentic expression of Cuban Culture. Rap music in Cuba is heavily influenced by the country's pre-existing musical traditions, such as salsa and rumba.

In some ways, hip hop is tolerated by the government of Cuba and performers are provided with venues and equipment by the government. The Cuban rap and hip-hop scene sought out the involvement of the Ministry of Culture in the production and promotion of their music, which would otherwise have been impossible to accomplish. After the Cuban government provided lukewarm endorsement, the Cuban Rap Agency provided the Cuban rap scene, in 2002, with groups like Orishas and Los Aldeanos.

The government gives rap and hip-hop groups time on mass media outlets in return for hip-hop artists limiting self-expression and presenting the government in a positive way. Rappers who openly speak about race, inequality, or the realities of Black life in Cuba continue to face heavy scrutiny from the government. In a country where official narratives still avoid open discussions about racism, those who dare to rhyme about it become political, whether they intend to or not. Many Cuban MCs have seen their songs banned from radio and television, their concerts canceled, and their online platforms restricted. Some have been harassed, detained, or forced into exile simply for turning the microphone into a mirror that reflects the streets.

The Cuban rap scene — once born in Havana’s neighborhoods as a voice for the marginalized — has become a space of resistance and identity. Its artists fuse rhythm and rebellion, turning lyrics into weapons of truth. Yet, despite censorship and constant surveillance, the movement refuses to die; it adapts, evolves underground, and carries the spirit of protest through every beat, every verse, every breath of a generation that refuses silence. The government recognizes that hip-hop is growing in Cuba, and would be difficult to eliminate.

==== Cubatón ====
Like reggae en Español from Panama and reggaeton from Puerto Rico is a new genre for the Cubans but by 2012 was so massively popular that "the face of Cuban pop music" was considered to be Cuban reggae (cubatón) singer, Osmani García "La Voz". The advent of web software helped to distribute music unofficially. Both lyrics and dance movements have been criticised. Reggaeton musicians such as responded by making songs that defended their music. Despite their efforts, the Ministry of Culture has ruled that reggaeton is not to be used in teaching institutions, parties and at discos, and in 2011 restricted its airplay after massive popularity of García's "Chupi Chupi", which referred to oral sex. Other popular cubatón artists include Eddy K, Los 4, Chocolate MC, El Micha, Elvis Manuel, Chacal y Yakarta, Los desiguales, El Taiger, Jacob Forever, El Yonki, William El Magnifico and Gente de Zona ("People from the 'Zone").By 2025 it has transformed into "Repaton".

=== Rock music in Cuba ===
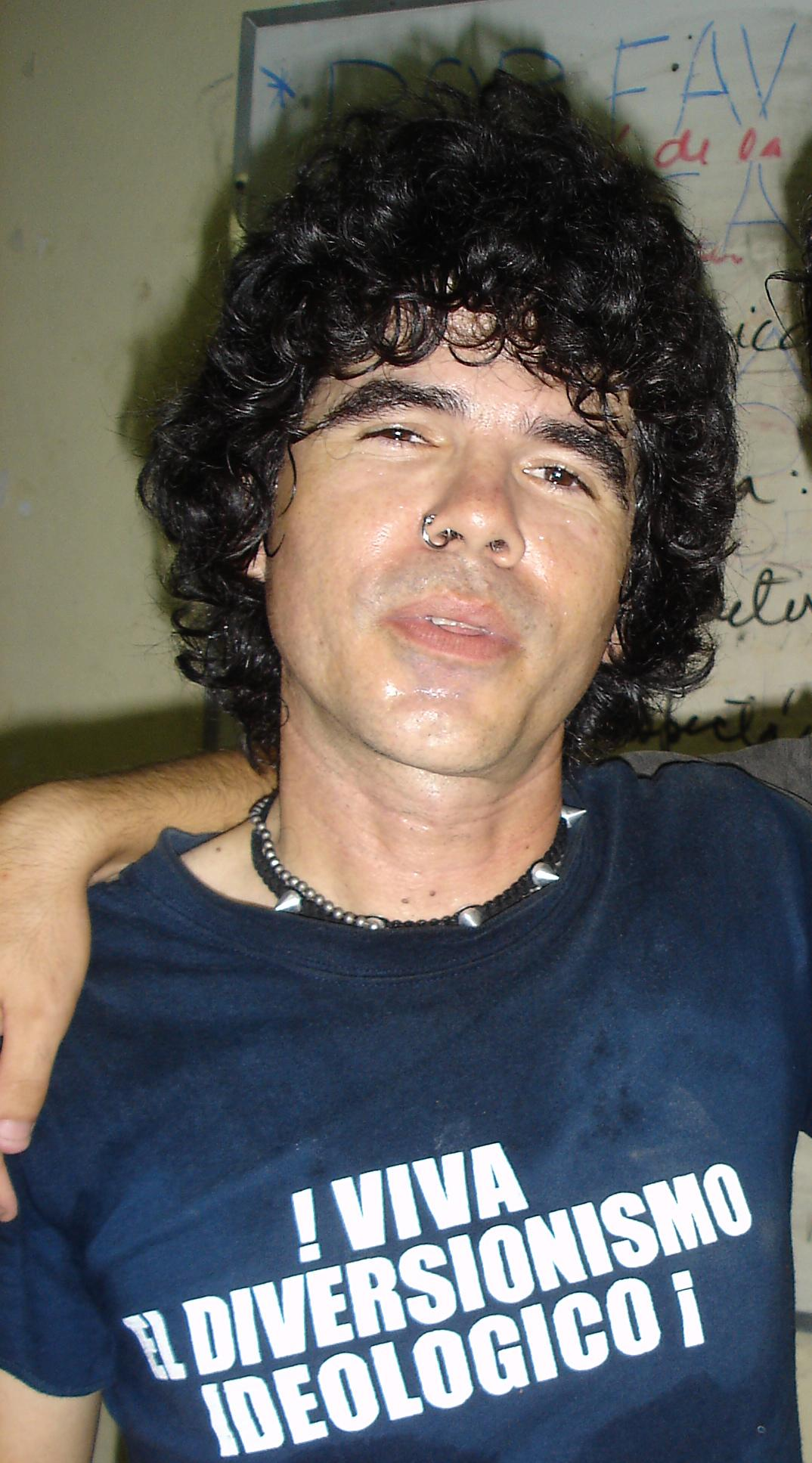
Gorki Águila, leader of the Cuban rock band Porno para Ricardo

The musical interaction between Cuba and the US is ancient. Already in the 18th century, during the Spanish rule of Louisiana (1763–1803), the Havanese orchestras and bands offered concerts in New Orleans and in the 19th century the Cuban contradanza was very popular in the US. At the beginning of the 20th century, the first jazz bands were created in Cuba, in the style of the American groups. The "Sagua" Jaz Band was founded in Sagua la Grande in 1914 by Pedro Stacholy (conductor and pianist). The group played during 14 years at the Teatro Principal de Sagua.

The strong influence of the American music on the Cuban younger generations gave way to the beginning of the soloists and groups of rock and roll in Cuba during the 1950s. Many Cuban artists sang versions of American songs translated to Spanish, as it was also happening in Mexico.

The launching of the group Los LLopis represented the entrance in a new stage for the Cuban music, that of the generation and amplification of the sound by electroacoustic devices; primarily the use of an electric guitar.

In 1961, other artists emerged such as Dany Puga, called the King of Twist, and bands such as Los Satélites, Los Diablos Melódicos and Los Enfermos del Rock, as well as Los Halcones and Los Huracanes from Marianao.

The vocal quartet Los Zafiros was another successful group from the beginning of the sixties. Founded in 1961, it was influenced by the doo-wop style of The Platters, The Diamonds and other American groups, and counted on a repertoire consisting of ballads, calypsos and bossanovas, as well as songs with a slow rock ad bolero rhythms.

At that time, the popular group Los Astros, led by the singer and guitarist Raúl Gómez, was threatened by pressures exerted by the Fidel Castro regime over the rock groups, which were considered as a form of "ideological diversionism" and actively opposed in all its manifesations. Its style, strongly influenced by the British Invasion groups, as the Beatles and the Rolling Stones, was labelled as "deviant" and consequently repressed without any hesitation. Since then, the Revolutionary government of Cuba began to implement an absolute control over all aspects of the Cuban society, including, of course, all cultural expressions.

Around 1965, the Revolutionary government implemented a strategy to substitute the foreign products that the young people preferred, with others that better matched their official guidelines; and as a result of this strategy, a new radio program called Nocturno was broadcast in 1966, which initial musical theme was "La chica de la valija" (Girl with a suitcase) from the Italian sax player Fausto Papetti. The program presented modern songs, giving priority to the European repertoire in Spanish language of soloists and groups such as Los Mustang, Los Bravos, Los Brincos, Juan y Junior, Rita Pavone, Massiel, Nino Bravo, Leonardo Fabio, Salvatore Adamo and Raphael, and some Cuban groups as Los Zafiros and Los Dan. The ban against rock music was lifted in 1966, but rock fans continued to be marginalized by the communist establishment, and watched over with suspicion as "counter-revolutionaries".

Actually, rock music began to be heard in Havana during the seventies, in a radio program from Radio Marianao called Buenas Tardes Juventud. That program presented groups such as The Rolling Stones, The Beatles, Dave Clark Five, The Animals, Grand Funk, Rare Earth, Led Zeppelin, Jimi Hendrix, Elvis Presley, Neil Sedaka and Paul Anka. At the beginning of the eighties, that radio station joined Radio Ciudad de La Habana.

In 1979, a three-day music festival called Havana Jam took place at the Karl Marx Theater, in Havana, Cuba, where a group of rock artists that included Billy Joel and Stephen Stills performed.

In the 1980s, a heavy metal band called Venus was formed by Roberto Armada in Municipio Playa. They achieved much success and created a headbanger following among the Cuban youth. Punk rock was introduced in Cuba in the late 1980s and gained a cult-type following among a minority of the youth.

During the 1990s, rock and roll in Cuba was still an underground phenomenon. In Havana, the "Ciudad de La Habana" radio station presented several programs showing the most recent tendencies on that type of music around the world. Juan Camacho, an old musician and radio host had a morning program called Disco Ciudad. El Programa de Ramón was also a successful radio show. Some bands from that period were Gens, Zeus and Los Tarsons.

In 2001, the Welsh group Manic Street Preachers was invited to perform in Cuba, and Fidel Castro attended its concert along with other government authorities. In 2004, Castro gave a speech honoring the birthday of John Lennon, whose music, as a member of The Beatles and as a soloist, was banned in Cuba for a very long time. A bronze statue of Lennon was placed in a Havanese well-known park, and it achieved notoriety for being a victim of constant vandalism from passersby that frequently stole its bronze spectacles.

At the same time that the government was showing a more indulgent attitude toward the foreign rock groups, as part of an international campaign which purpose was to achieve an opening in the commercial transactions and investments of the US and Europe in Cuba, it continued to implement an inflexible repression against any form of internal dissidence. This was the case of the rocker Gorki Águila and his group Porno para Ricardo. In August 2008, Águila was arrested under charges of dangerousness, a law that allows the authorities to detain people whom they think are likely to commit crimes, even when they have not yet committed them.

More recently, Rick Wakeman, Sepultura and Audioslave performed in Havana, and The Rolling Stones offered an historic concert.

A new phenomenon occurred in 2013 when several Cuban underground metal bands begin to emigrate to the United States, creating a parallel scene with the bands Agonizer, Escape, Ancestor, Hipnosis, Suffering Tool and Chlover.

== Sources ==
The works below are reliable sources for all aspects of traditional Cuban popular music. Spanish titles indicate those that have not been translated into English.

- Acosta, Leonardo 1987. From the drum to the synthesiser. Martí, Havana, Cuba. Articles written from 1976 to 1982.
- Acosta, Leonardo 2003. Cubano be, cubano bop: one hundred years of jazz in Cuba. Transl. Daniel S. Whitesell. Smithsonian, Washington, D.C. Outstanding review by former conjunto trumpeter.
- Betancur Alvarez, Fabio 1993. Sin clave y bongó no hay son: música afrocubano y confluencias musicales de Colombia y Cuba. Antioqia, Medellín, Colombia.
- Blanco, Jesús 1992. 80 años del son y soneros en el Caribe. Caracas.
- Brill, Mark. Music of Latin America and the Caribbean, 2nd Edition, 2018. Taylor & Francis ISBN 1138053562
- Cabrera, Lydia 1958. La sociedád secreta Abakuá. Colección del Chicerekú, La Habana.
- Calderon, Jorge 1983. Maria Teresa Vera. La Habana.
- Calvo Ospina, Hernando 1995. Salsa! Havana heat, Bronx beat. Latin American Bureau.
- Cañizares, Dulcila 1995. La trova tradicional. 2nd ed, La Habana.
- Cañizares, Dulcila 1999. Gonzalo Roig, hombre y creador.
- Carpentier, Alejo 2001 [1945]. Music in Cuba. Minneapolis MN. A standard work on the history of Cuban music up to 1940.
- Chediak, Natalio 1998. Diccionario del jazz latino. Fundacion Author, Barcelona.
- Collazo, Bobby 1987. La ultima noche que pase contigo: 40 anos de fanandula Cubana. Cubanacan, Puerto Rico.
- Depestre Catony, Leonardo 1989. Homenaje a la musica cubana. Oriente, Santiago de Cuba. Biographies of Abelardo Barroso, Joseíto Fernández, Paulina Alvarez, Roberto Faz and Pacho Alonso.
- Depestre Catony, Leonardo 1990. Cuatro musicos de una villa. Letras Cubanas, La Habana. Biographies of four musicians from Guanabacoa: Ernesto Lecuona, Rita Montaner, Bola de Nieve and Juan Arrondo.
- Díaz Ayala, Cristóbal 1981. Música cubana del Areyto a la Nueva Trova. 2nd rev ed, Cubanacan, San Juan P.R. Excellent history up to the 1960s, with a chapter on Cuban music in the US.
- Díaz Ayala, Cristóbal 1988. Si te quieres por el pico divertir: historia del pregón musical latinoamericano. Cubanacan, San Juan P.R. Music based on street-sellers cries; title is taken from lyricof Peanut Vendor.
- Díaz Ayala, Cristóbal 1994. Cuba canta y baila: discografía de la música cubana 1898–1925. Fundación Musicalia, San Juan P.R. A vital research tool.
- Díaz Ayala, Cristóbal 1998. Cuando sali de la Habana 1898-1997: cien anos de musica cubana por el mundo. Cubanacan, San Juan P.R.
- Failde, Osvalde Castillo 1964. Miguel Faílde: créador musical del Danzón. Consejo Nacional de Cultura, La Habana.
- Fairley, Jan. 2000. Troubadours old and new, and ¡Que rico bailo yo! How well I dance. In S. Broughton and M. Ellingham, with J. McConnachie and O. Duane, (eds) World Music, Vol. 2: Latin & North America, Caribbean, India, Asia and Pacific p386-413. Rough Guides, Penguin. ISBN 1-85828-636-0
- Fajardo, Ramon 1993. Rita Montaner. La Habana.
- Fajardo, Ramon 1997. Rita Montaner: testimonio de una epoca. La Habana.
- Fernandez Robaina, Tomas 1983. Recuerdos secretos de los mujeres publicas. La Habana.
- Galan, Natalio 1983. Cuba y sus sones. Pre-Textos, Valencia.
- Giro, Radamés (ed) 1993. El mambo. La Habana. Nine essays by Cuban musicians and musicologists.
- Giro, Radamés (ed) 1998. Panorama de la musica popular Cubana. Letras Cubanas, La Habana. Reprints some important essays on Cuban popular music.
- Giro, Radamés 2007. Diccionario enciclopédico de la música en Cuba. 4 vols, La Habana. An invaluable source.
- Grenet, Emilio 1939. Popular Cuban music. Havana.
- Leal, Rine 1986. Teatro del siglo XIX. La Habana.
- Leon, Carmela de 1990. Sindo Garay: memoria de un trovador. La Habana.
- Leon, Argeliers 1964. Musica folklorica cubana. Biblioteca Nacional José Martí, La Habana.
- Leymarie, Isabelle (1998). Cuba: La Musique des dieux. Paris: Éditions du Layeur. ISBN 978-2911468162.
- Leymarie, Isabelle (2002). Cuban Fire: The Story of salsa and Latin jazz. New York: Continuum. ISBN 978-0826455864.
- Leymarie, Isabelle (2003). La Música cubana: Cuba. Barcelona: Océano. ISBN 978-8449424090.
- Linares, María Teresa 1970. La música popular. La Habana, Cuba. Illustrated introduction.
- Linares, María Teresa 1981. La música y el pueblo. La Habana, Cuba.
- Lowinger, Rosa and Ofelia Fox 2005. Tropicana nights: the life and times of the legendary Cuban nightclub. Harcourt, Orlando FL. Fox (1924–2006) was the wife of the owner.
- Loyola Fernandez, Jose 1996. El ritmo en bolero: el bolero en la musica bailable cubana. Huracan, Rio Piedras.
- Manuel, Peter (ed) 1991. Essays on Cuban Music: North America and Cuban perspectives. Lanham MD.
- Manuel, Peter, with K. Bilby and M. Largey. 2006. Caribbean currents: Caribbean music from rumba to reggae 2nd ed. Temple University. ISBN 1-59213-463-7
- Martinez, Orlando 1989. Ernesto Lecuona. La Habana, Cuba.
- Naser, Amín E. 1985. Benny Moré: perfil libre. La Habana, Cuba.
- Orovio, Helio 1995. El bolero latino. La Habana.
- Orovio, Helio 2004. Cuban music from A to Z. Revised by Sue Steward. ISBN 0-8223-3186-1 A biographical dictionary of Cuban music, artists, composers, groups and terms. Duke University, Durham NC; Tumi, Bath.
- Ortiz, Fernando 1950. La Afrocania de la musica folklorica de Cuba. La Habana, revised ed 1965.
- Ortiz, Fernando 1951. Los bailes y el teatro de los negros en el folklore de Cuba. Letras Cubanas, La Habana. Continuation of the previous book; contains transcriptions of percussion innotation and lyrics of toques and cantos a los santos variously in Lucumi and Spanish.
- Ortiz, Fernando 1952. Los instrumentos de la musica Afrocubana. 5 volumes, La Habana.
- Padura Fuentes, Leonardo 2003. Faces of salsa: a spoken history of the music. Translated by Stephen J. Clark. Smithsonian, Washington, D.C. Interviews with top musicians, recorded in the 1989–1993 era.
- Peñalosa, David 2009. The clave matrix; Afro-Cuban rhythm: its principles and African origins. Redway, CA: Bembe Inc. ISBN 1-886502-80-3.
- Pérez Sanjuro, Elena 1986. Historia de la música cubana. Miami.
- Perna, Vincenzo 2005. "Timba, the Sound of the Cuban Crisis". Ashgate, Aldershot, UK-Burlington, US
- Pichardo, Esteban 1835 (repr 1985). Diccionario provincial casi razionado de voces y frases cubanos. La Habana. Includes contemporary explanations of musical and dance names.
- Roberts, John Storm 1979. The Latin tinge: the impact of Latin American music on the United States. Oxford. One of the first on this theme; still excellent.
- Roberts, John Storm 1999. Latin jazz: the first of the fusions, 1880s to today. Schirmer, N.Y.
- Rodríguez Ruidíaz, Armando: El origen de la música cubana. Mitos y realidades. Academia.edu, 2015.
- Rodríguez Domíngues, Ezequiel. El Trio Matamoros: trienta y cinco anos de música popular. La Habana.
- Rondon, César Miguel 2008. The book of salsa: a chronicle of urban music from the Caribbean to New York City. University of North Carolina Press.
- Roy, Maya 2002. Cuban music: from son and rumba to the Buena Vista Social Club and timba cubana. Latin American Bureau/Wiener.
- Steward, Sue 1991. Salsa: musical heartbeat of Latin America. Thames & Hudson, London. Highly illustrated.
- Sublette, Ned 2004. Cuba and its music: from the first drums to the mambo. Chicago. ISBN 1-55652-516-8 First of two planned volumes, covers up to March 1952.
- Sweeney, Philip 2001. The Rough Guide to Cuban music: the history, the artists, the best CDs. Rough Guides, London. Small format.
- Thomas, Hugh 1971. Cuba, or the pursuit of freedom. Eyre & Spottiswoode, London. Revised and abridged edition 2001, Picador, London. The abridged edition, a slim-line 1151 pages, has shortened the section of Cuba's early history. The standard work in English.
- Thomas, Hugh 1997. The slave trade: the history of the Atlantic slave trade 1440-1870. Picador, London. 925 pages.
- Urfé, Odilio 1965. El danzón. La Habana.
