= Classical piano in Cuba =

After its arrival in Cuba at the end of the 18th century, the pianoforte (commonly called piano) rapidly became one of the favorite instruments among the Cuban population. Along with the humble guitar, the piano accompanied the popular Cuban guarachas and contradanzas (derived from the European country dance) at salons and ballrooms in Havana and all over the country.

== 19th century ==
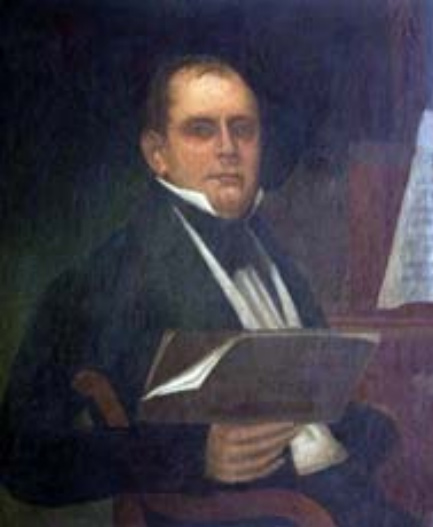
Juan Federico Edelmann.

As soon as in 1804, a concert program in Havana announced a vocal concert “accompanied at the fortepiano by a distinguished foreigner recently arrived” and in 1832, Juan Federico Edelmann (1795-1848), a renowned pianist, son of a famous Alsatian composer and pianist, arrived in Havana and gave a very successful concert at the Teatro Principal. Encouraged by the warm welcome, Edelmann decided to stay in Havana and very soon he was promoted to an important position within the Santa Cecilia Philharmonic Society. In 1836 he opened a music store and publishing company.

Edelmann worked also as a piano professor and had several prestigious disciples. One of the most renowned is Manuel Saumell Robredo (1818-1870). Although his activity as a pianist never transcended the limits of his country, he acquired fame as a composer for elevating the category of the Cuban contradanza, from a simple dance tune to an actual “pièce de concert,” meant to be performed in the elegant salons of the Cuban haute bourgeoisie.

Differently from Saumell, two other disciples of Edelmann, Pablo Desvernine (1823-1910) and Fernando Arizti (1828-1888), achieved recognition outside their country. After studying with Edelmann, Desvernine went to Paris to continue studies with Kalkenbrenner and Thalberg. He gave concerts in several European and American Cities, and also worked as a piano teacher in New York before returning to Cuba. Ferando Arizti also studied in Paris with Kalkenbrenner and played with his friend Desvernine in Spain. After his return to Cuba in 1848, he dedicated himself to teaching and had several important disciples such as: Nicolás Ruiz Espadero (1832-1890), his daughter Cecilia Aristi (1856-1930) and Angelina Sicouret (1880-1945).

Ruiz Espadero also studied with Polish composer Julian Fontana, the first to compose a piece of complex format for piano that included Cuban themes, La Havanne, Fantaisie sur des motifs américains et espagnols op. 10, from 1845. Espadero was a close friend of American pianist and composer Louis Moreau Gottschalk and was certainly a virtuoso pianist, but rarely played in public due to his introverted character. He was also a fine composer and professor. Fernando Arizti's daughter, Cecilia, studied with his father and with Espadero. She gave concerts in Cuba and America and was an accomplished composer and professor.

Nicolás Ruiz Espadero was also a professor of other distinguished artists such as Carlos Alfredo Peyrellade (1840-1908) and Ignacio Cervantes Kawanagh (1847-1905). After studying with Espadero, Peyrellade went to continue his musical education in Paris, where he pursued a piano performance career. In 1865, he returned to Cuba where he opened two well known music schools in Havana and Camagüey.

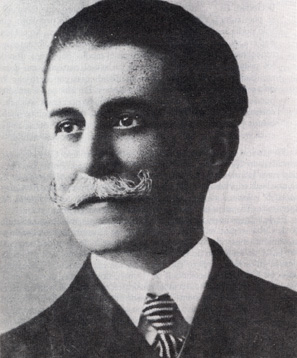
Ignacio Cervantes.

One of the most prestigious Cuban musicians, Ignacio Cervantes studied in Paris with professors Marmontel and Alkan. He received several piano awards, was a candidate to the Rome Award and received compliments from Rossini, Liszt and Paderewski. During the Ten Years' War, Cervantes lived and gave concerts in the United States and Mexico. After the Cuban independence he worked as orchestra director at the Tacón Theatre. Ignacio Cervantes is considered one of the greatest composers of his country, and his Cuban Dances for piano are an outstanding contribution to the island's cultural patrimony.

Another successful Cuban pianist from the 19th century was José Manuel "Lico" Jiménez (1851-1917). He studied with Reinecke and Moscheles in Leipzig and with Marmontel in Paris. Jiménez gave numerous successful recitals throughout Europe and Wagner and Liszt complimented him as a pianist. Lico Jiménez returned to Cuba in 1879 and in 1890 he established himself in Hamburg, Germany, where he was appointed as professor at the conservatory.

=== Late 19th century ===
At the turn of the century, two notable pianists established themselves in Cuba and founded conservatories that contributed to the academic formation of numerous Cuban pianists and musicians. They were Hubert de Blanck (1856–1932), a Dutch pianist, and the Asturian professor Benjamín Orbón (1874–1914), father of the renowned pianist and composer Julián Orbón (1925–1991), a distinguished member of the “Grupo de Renovación Musical.”

Alberto Falcón (1873–1961) studied piano at Conservatorio Hubert de Blanck in his early years and at a later time won a competition for the piano professorial chair at the Bordeaux Conservatory in France. He studied composition with Jules Massenet and toured through Europe and Cuba as a pianist. Upon returning to his country, he opened a conservatory that bore his name, where he encouraged the practice of chamber music. He also created an orchestra for that purpose. Falcón was a member of the Honor Committee at the Paris Conservatory and also a member of the National Academy of Arts and Humanities.

Very much like Alberto Falcón, Cuban pianist, composer and professor Joaquín Nin Castellanos (1879–1949) lived most of his life outside his motherland. He studied in Spain and in France at the Schola Cantorum, and lived in Germany for some years. After returning to Cuba in 1910, he moved to Brussels, where he gave concerts and lectures. He also worked as a professor at the University of Brussels. Nin Castellanos returned to Havana in 1939, where he dedicated himself to teaching piano. Pianist and composer Ernestina Lecuona (1882–1951) began his musical studies at the Centro Asturiano Music Academy in Havana and continued studies at the Paris Conservatory. As a pianist, she gave numerous concerts in Cuba and throughout America. She taught the first music lessons to her famous brother Ernesto Lecuona and was also the grandmother of the prestigious composer and guitarist Leo Brouwer.

== 20th century ==
=== Pre-revolutionary period ===
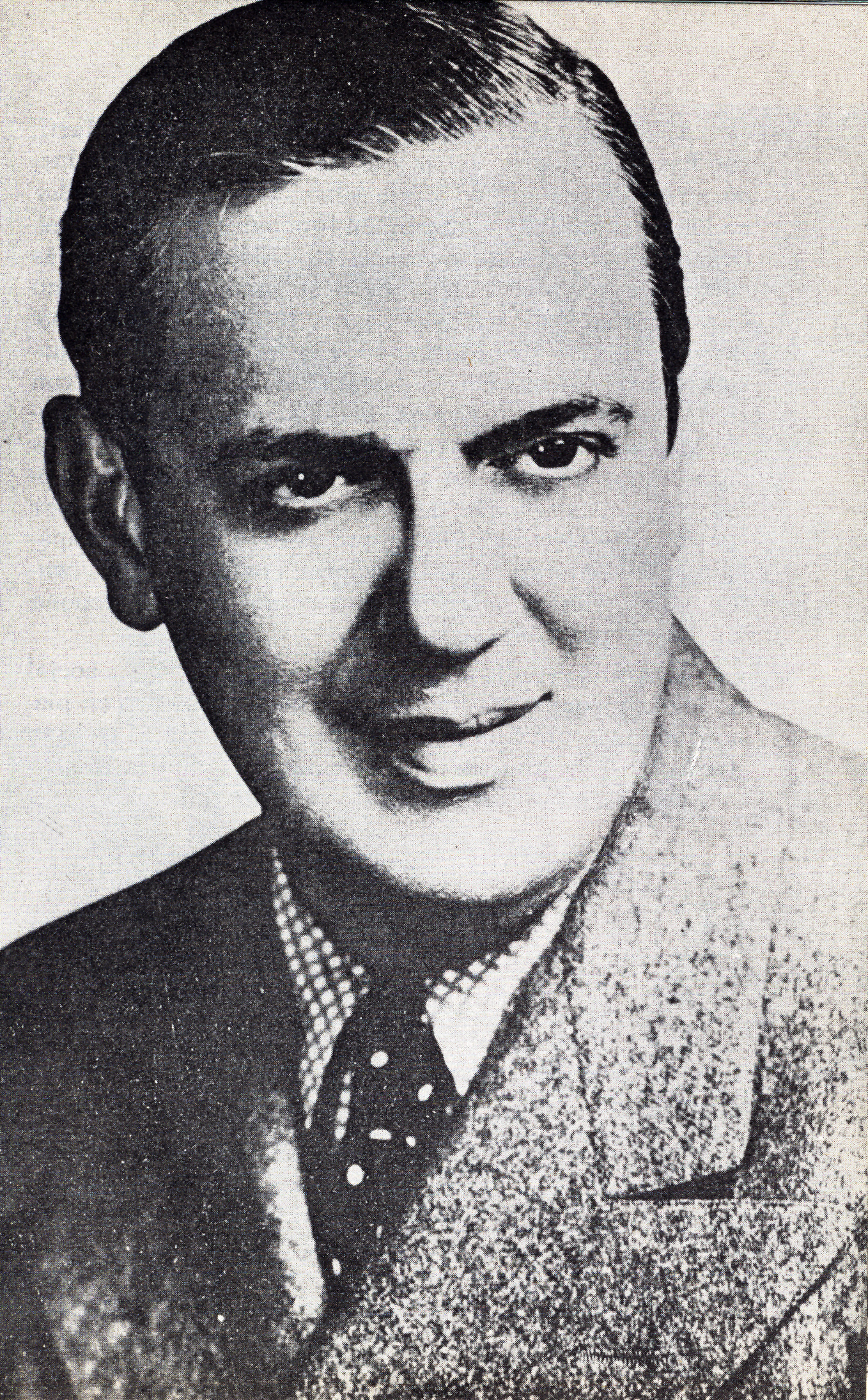
Ernesto Lecuona.

One of the most prestigious Cuban musicians, Ernesto Lecuona (1895–1963) began studying piano with his sister Ernestina and continued with Peyrellade, Saavedra, Nin and Hubert de Blanck. A child prodigy, Lecuona gave a concert at just five years of age at the Círculo Hispano. When graduating from the National Conservatory he was awarded the First Prize and the Gold Medal of his class by unanimous decision of the board. He is by far the Cuban composer of greatest international recognition and had many contributions to the Cuban piano tradition.

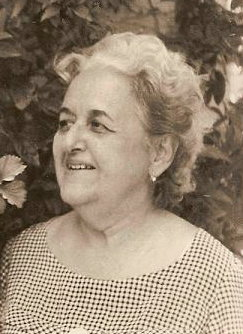
Margot Rojas.

There were three important professors that made an outstanding effort, from the beginning to the middle of the 20th century, toward the implementation of the highest standards in the academic formation of piano performers. Three of them, César Pérez Sentenat (1896–1973) and Margot Rojas (1903–1996) lived and worked in Havana, and the other one, Dulce María Serret (1898–?) in Santiago de Cuba.

César Pérez Sentenat began to study piano in 1913 with Hubert de Blanck, Rafaela Serrano and Antonio Saavedra, and music theory with José Molina. In 1922 he travelled to Paris, where he studied with Joaquín Nin Castellanos.

In 1922, Pérez Sentenat was appointed as professor of piano and harmony at the National Conservatory, and in 1940 he served as associate professor at the Sherwood Music School in Chicago. Sentenat also served as professor at the Conservatorio Municipal de Música, and in 1931 he was appointed as director of that educational institution. In 1931, he founded the Escuela Normal de Música along with composer Amadeo Roldán, where he expanded the courses and organized a night school. He also participated in the foundation of the Conservatorio Internacional de Música, directed by María Jones de Castro, in collaboration with Caridad Benítez, where they implemented the first musical preschool and college in Cuba.

In 1945 he was designated as provincial inspector of music in Havana, and in 1948 as general inspector. In 1961 he was appointed as professor of piano and director of the Guillermo M. Tomás Conservatory in Guanabacoa, and in 1965 he served as general music director of the National Culture Council and president of the Musical Education Reform Commission. His students included renowned musicians such as Solomon Mikowsky, Magaly Ruiz, Juan Piñera and Horacio Gutiérrez.

Margot Rojas was born in Veracruz, Mexico, in 1903, and established her residence in Cuba in 1912. She began studying piano at the National Conservatory, where she received several awards; and at a later time she went to New York to continue her piano training with Alexander Lambert. Rojas was a distinguished teacher in several educational institutions, including the Amadeo Roldán Conservatory and the National School of Arts (ENA). She also offered concerts as a soloist and accompanied by orchestras such as the National Symphony Orchestra.

Dulce María Serret was born in Santiago de Cuba, in 1898, and began studying music with Gustavo Rogel and Ramón Figueroa. At a later time she travelled to Spain with a government grant to study piano at the Madrid Conservatory with Joseph-Édouard Risler. After offering several successful concerts in Madrid and Paris, she returned to Cuba in 1926, where she played at the National Theater. In 1927 Serret established her residence in Santiago de Cuba, where she founded a conservatory and taught piano to many renowned performers.

Jorge Bolet (1914–1990) studied at the Curtis Institute in Philadelphia, and after graduating in 1935 he served as professor at the same institution and at the Indiana University School of Music. A virtuoso pianist closely associated with the works of Franz Liszt, he was a friend of Rachmaninoff, and enjoyed a great international reputation.

Other notable pianists that began their careers during the Cuban Pre-Revolutionary period (1900–1959) are Zenaida Manfugás, Enma Badía Fontanals, Esther Ferrer, Ñola Sahig, Luis González Rojas, Huberal Herrera, Silvio Rodríguez Cárdenas and Rosario Franco.

One of the most accomplished Cuban pianists of the 20th century, Ivette Hernández (born 1933) gave a piano recital at seven years of age at the University of Havana. She studied at the Havana Municipal Conservatory and in New York with Claudio Arrau and Sidney Foster. She also studied at the Paris Conservatory where she won the First Piano Prize. Among other awards, Hernández received the Harriet Cohen Medal in London and the First Prize at the Gottschalk International Contest in New Orleans. She established herself in Spain in the mid-1960s.

=== Post-revolutionary period ===
After the advent of the Cuban Revolution in 1959, several pianists received scholarships to study abroad at the former Soviet Union or other socialist countries. A partial list may include the following: Karelia Escalante, Nancy Casanova, Cecilio Tieles Ferrer, Jorge Gómez Labraña, Ninowska Fernández-Brito, Frank Fernández, Teresita Junco and Hilda Melis. The following generation of pianists, mostly formed at the National School of Arts and the Conservatorio Amadeo Roldán include: Alberto Joya, Roberto Urbay, Martha Marchena, Jorge Luis Prats, Esther Sanz and Ileana Bautista, among others.

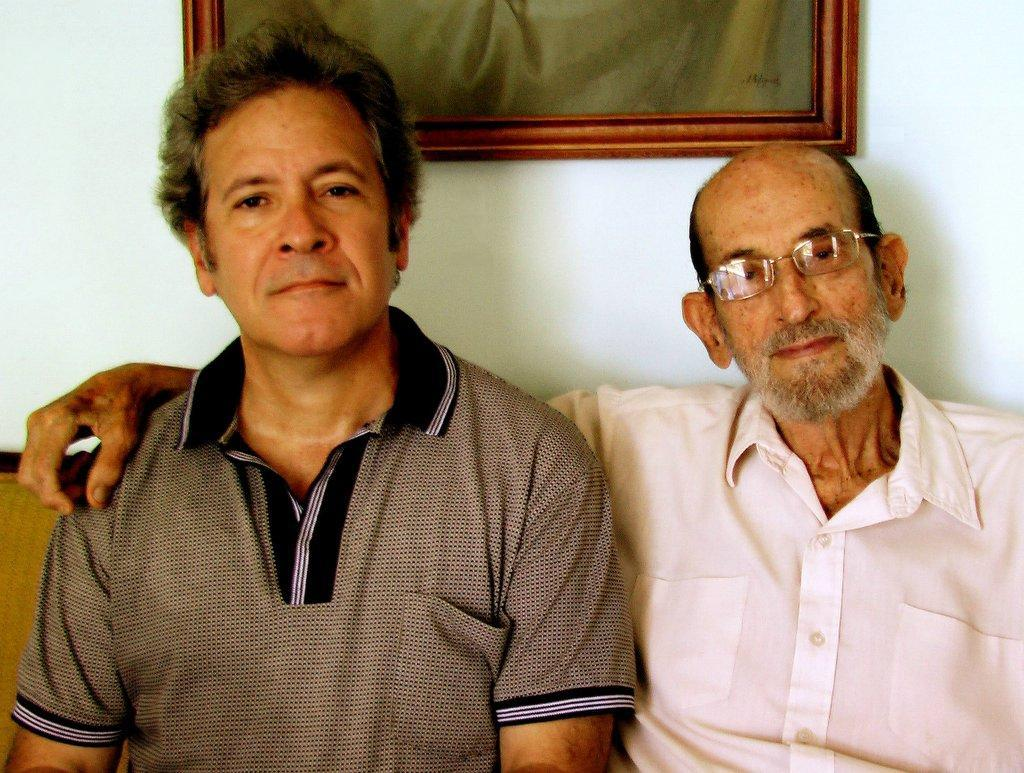
Roberto Urbay and Harold Gramatges.

Roberto Urbay (born 1953) studied at the National School of Arts with Margot Rojas and Silvio Rodríguez Cárdenas. He was awarded a scholarship to study at the Tchaikovsky Conservatory in Moscow and received the UNEAC Prize (Unión Nacional de Escritores y Artistas de Cuba) in 1973. He also received the Special Prize in Chamber Music at the Grandstand for Young Interpreters at the Inter-podium Festival in Bratislava in 1977. Urbay has toured and recorded extensively. One of his most important musical achievements has been a consistent research, performance and recording of the Cuban piano repertoire that include a long list of composers such as: Manuel Saumell, Ignacio Cervantes, Ernesto Lecuona, Alejandro García Caturla, Harold Gramatges, José Ardévol, Edgardo Martín, Hilario González, Fabio Landa, Leo Brouwer, Carlos Fariñas, Héctor Angulo, Roberto Valera, Carlos Malcolm, Armando Rodríguez Ruidíaz and Juan Piñera. He currently works at the Music Department at the Universidad Nacional de Cuyo, in Mendoza, Argentina, where he is a full professor since 1995.

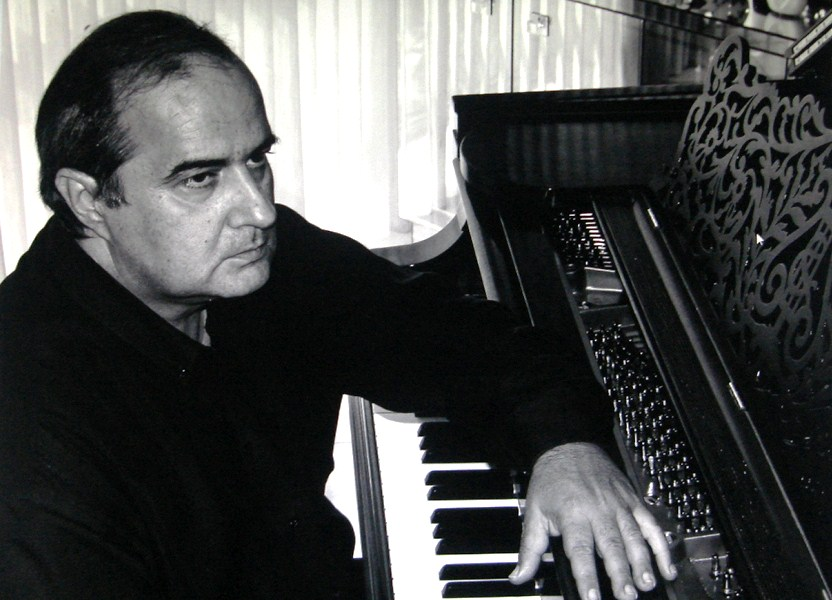
Jorge Luis Prats.

One of the most prominent pianists from the younger generations, Jorge Luis Prats (1956) studied at the National School of Arts with Margot Rojas and graduated in 1976. Prats continued studies with Frank Fernández, and in 1977 he won the Piano Grand Prix at the Margueritte Long-Jacques Thibaud Contest in Paris. At that time he was also selected as the Best Player of the Contest and received the Ravel Award. In 1979, Jorge Luis Prats was awarded the gold medal at the Katia Popova Music Festival of Winning Contestants in Pleven, Bulgaria. Since then he has developed a highly successful performance career. Prats has established his permanent residence in the United States.

At the beginning of the Cuban Revolution some pianists left the country at an early age and developed successful careers abroad. In this group was Horacio Gutiérrez (born 1950), who played at just eleven years old with the Havana Symphony Orchestra and moved to Los Angeles with his family in 1962. He graduated at Juilliard School and has played with the most prestigious orchestras throughout the world. He has also recorded extensively.

Santiago Rodríguez (born 1952) arrived in the United States when he was eight years old through the Operation Peter Pan. Rodríguez performed with the New Orleans Symphony Orchestra when he was just ten years old. He obtained a Master of Music degree with Adele Marcus at the Juilliard School. Rodríguez has enjoyed a very successful performing and recording career and is currently the chair of the Keyboard Department at the University of Miami's Frost School of Music.

Zeyda Ruga Suzuki (born 1943) began her musical education in Cuba, at Havana's Municipal Conservatory of Music, and at age sixteen went to the United States to study at Philadelphia's Curtis Institute of Music, where she was a pupil of Rudolf Serkin and Eleanor Sokoloff. After receiving her artist diploma at Curtis, she earned a doctorate from Québec's Laval University, where she also served as associate professor and department head of chamber music. Ruga Suzuki has enjoyed an international career, touring widely throughout the United States, Canada, Europe, and Asia. Often a guest of Chicago's Rembrandt Chamber Players and the Miami String Quartet, she has also offered master classes at Miami's New World Symphony and the European Piano Teachers Association in Blonay, Switzerland.
