= Cecilio Tieles =

Cecilio Tieles Ferrer (born 1942 in Havana, Cuba) is a Cuban pianist, professor and musicologist.

== Academic background ==
Cecilio Tieles began his piano studies in Havana, Cuba, with professors Arturo Marcelín and César Pérez Sentenat. In 1952, he travelled to Paris, where he studied with Madeleine Berthelier, Joseph Benvenutti and Marcel Ciampi. From 1958 to 1966, Tieles studied at the Tchaikovsky Conservatory in Moscow with professors Samuel Feinberg, Ludmila Roschina and Stanislav Neuhaus. Cecilio Tieles graduated in 1963, and at a later time took post-grade courses until 1966.

== Pianist ==
In Cuba, Cecilio Tieles has developed an outstanding work as a concert pianist, and has offered numerous concerts as a soloist with national and regional symphonic orchestras. He has also participated in numerous international events and the specialized critique has praised his virtues as an interpreter and music professional. Tieles has presented himself as a soloist in Europe, Asia, Africa, Latin America and the US, and has also participated in several international festivals.

An important part of his work is the activity dedicated to the duet in which he participates with his brother Evelio Tieles. The Tieles duet have received accolades from music specialists in several countries and has accumulated a vast repertoire of works from different styles and epochs. Due to their high professional level, many outstanding composers, among which we can mention Ramón Barce, Xavier Benguerel, Harold Gramatges, José Ardévol, Nilo Rodríguez, Gottfried Glöckner and Salvador Pueyo, have dedicated original pieces to them. Their interpretive expertise has allowed them to acquire an ample and varied repertoire that include pieces from Cuban contemporary composers such as: Juan Piñera, Alfredo Diez Nieto and Roberto Valera

Cecilio Tieles has been invited to participate as a juror in national and international piano contests, such as those from: Ciutat de Manresa (Spain); Xavier Montsalvatge (Spain); Ernesto Lecuona (Cuba); Ignacio Cervantes (Cuba); III Concurso Iberoamericano de Piano “Escuela Nacional de Arte”, Havana (Cuba); Festival Internacional de Música Latinoamericana (Bolivia); Concurso Internacional “Paul Badura-Skoda” (Spain); Concurso Internacional de Piano (Principado de Andorra) and Concurso Internacional de Piano “Cidade del Ferrol” (Galicia, Spain)

Tieles has performed as a piano soloist under the baton of Olaf Koch, Günther Herbig, Enrique González Mántici and Manuel Duchesne Cuzán, among other prestigious conductors, and has been invited to participate in international festivals such as those of Barcelona, Bratislava and Quito, Ecuador. He has recorded with Empresa de Grabaciones y Ediciones Musicales (EGREM) in Cuba, as well as other international labels abroad.

== Pedagogue ==
The experience and professional level of Cecilio Tieles has allowed him to develop an outstanding pedagogical labor in Cuba, as well as outside the country. He worked as professor and chair of the piano school at the Cuban National School of Arts (Cuba) from 1967 until 1980, and in the Instituto Superior de Arte in Havana, Cuba, from 1977 until 1984. Tieles participated as Piano National Advisor during the Music Education Reform in Cuba, which took place in 1968. He was also Music National Advisor at the Directory of Music Education at the Cuban Ministry of Culture.

In Spain, Cecilio Tieles has combined his work as concert pianist with his pedagogical activities, and his role as professor has been outstanding in Catalonia. In that Spanish region, he has served as professor and Chief of the Piano Area of the Conservatori Superior de Música del Liceu de Barcelona, and also served as professor at the Conservatori Profesional de Vila-Seca, since 1984. In both educational institutions he contributed to impulse reforms that have resulted in a novel experience in Spain. Many of his students has been awarded at different national and international contests.

The pedagogic labor of Tieles has been extended to other countries. He has offered master classes in the University of Miami and the Manhattan School of Music in New York, the North Netherland Conservatory in Groningen; the Conservatorio de Vigo, the Conservatorio de La Coruña, the Conservatorio de Santiago de Compostela and the Conservatorio de Ourense (Galicia, Spain), and also in Andorra, Bolivia, Venezuela and México. Most recently, during the year 2014, he offered master classes at the “Steinway Piano Gallery” in Miami, Florida.

== Musicologist ==
Cecilio Tieles has demonstrated a strong interest for the musicologic investigation and musicography, which has led him to study various aspects of the Cuban piano music, and especially the work of Cuban composer and pianist Nicolás Ruiz Espadero. The defense of his doctoral thesis at the Instituto Superior de Arte of Havana, was the first presented by a musician in that educational institution. Tieles has also recorded a collection of pieces from that important Cuban composer. His effort on behalf of the recovery and restoration of the uneditedFantasía-Balada from 1858, position Cecilio Tieles in a prominent investigative position and he is currently considered an expert on the life and work of Ruiz Espadero.

His participation in the production of the Dictionary of the Spanish and Hispanic-American music involved Cecilio Tieles as musicologic investigator. He has published also several articles in music specialized publications such as: Ritmo (Spain) and Ferrolanálisis (Spain), as well as in the Revista de Musicología (Spain) and in Muzyka (Rusia). The classes and lectures that he offers are appreciated throughout the world.

After more than two decades of investigative work, Tieles published the book “Espadero, música y nación en Cuba colonial”, which is a corrected and expanded edition of a previous version called: “Espadero y lo hispánico musical en Cuba”.

== Cultural advocate ==
Cecilio Tieles has dedicated considerable time and effort to the promotion of contemporary music and musicians. He was a Director and founder of the Jornadas de Música Cubana organized under the sponsorship of the Unión de Escritores y Artistas de Cuba (UNEAC) from 1976 to 1983.

Tieles founded the Associació Cultural Catalana-Iberoamericana in 1995, and he led it until 2016, since then he has served as Honorary President of that institution. He also presided over the Associació Catalana d’Intèrprets de Música Clàssica, from 2001 to 2010, and was a treasurer of the institution from 2010 until 2014.

Cecilio Tieles is a founding member of the first board of directors of the Unió de Músics de Catalunya from 2003 to 2010, an institution that serves more than 2500 Catalan musicians.

== Awards and recognitions ==
As pianist, Cecilio Tieles received the third position in the Vianna da Motta International Music Competition of Portugal in 1966, and the eight prize from the Long-Thibaud-Crespin Competition in París, France.

Tieles serves as President of the Associació Catalana d'Intèrprets de Música Clàssica (ACIMC), Vice president of the Unió de Músics de Catalunya (UMC) and member of the Unión de Escritores y Artistas de Cuba (UNEAC).
