= Opera in Cuba =

Opera has been present in Cuba since the latest part of the 18th century, when the first full-fledged theater, called Coliseo, was built. Since then to present times, the Cuban people have highly enjoyed opera, and many Cuban composers have cultivated the operatic genre, sometimes with great success at an international level.

== 19th century ==
The first documented operatic event in Havana took place in 1776. That presentation was mentioned in a note published in the newspaper Diario de La Habana on December 19, 1815: "…Today, Wednesday 19th of the current, if the weather allows, the new tragic opera of merit in three acts that contains 17 pieces of music, titled Dido Abandoned will be performed […] This is one of the premiere dramas from the French theater. In Italy, the one composed by renowned Metastasio deserved a singular applause, and was sung in this city on October 12, 1776." On August 9, 1807, another note was published in a Havanese newspaper that announced: "There is a Lyric-heroic drama in this printing shop titled America and Apolo which will be presented at this theater…", and on the following September 8 the premiere of the announced piece took place at the former Coliseo Theater, that had already changed its name to Principal. That was the first lyric piece composed in Cuba that we have information about, and its composer was Manuel de Sequeyra y Arango, Captain of the Havana Infantry Regiment. The piece was really a "dramatic action" in the Metastasian style; a brief composition in which the choir participated occasionally.

From 1810 to 1832 a lyric company performed several operas in Havana, among which were those called Las cuatro columnas del trono español and El major día de La Habana, and in 1811 another company arrived to that city that included the soprano Mariana Galino, contralto Isalbel Gamborino, tenor Juan Palau and the Italian composer Stefano Cristiani. Cristiani and other Spanish composers, such as Manuel Antonio Cocco and José Serrano, were very active, creating, producing and conducting operas in Havana, between 1815 and 1832.

Cristóbal Martínez Corrés was the first Cuban opera composer, but his Works, such as El diablo contrabandista and Don papanero were never premiered and haven't been preserved until the present time. Born in Havana, in 1822, composer and pianist Martínez Corrés established his residence together with his family in France when he was just nine years old; and at a later tame they went to Italy. Due to his premature death, a third opera named Safo, never surpassed an early creative stage. Martínez Corrés died in Genoa, in 1842.

Among the operatic composers that worked in Cuba during the first half of the 19th century we can mention the Spanish José María Trespuentes and Narciso Téllez, as well as the Italian Enea Elia. We should also mention two other renowned Italian composers, which arrived at a very young age to Havana to work as instrumental performers during the season of 1846–1847, and stayed in Cuba several years. One of them, Giovanni Battista Bottesini, composed his first opera, named Colón in Cuba, in the Island; and the other composer, Luigi Arditi, also premiered his opera Gulnara in Cuba, only four days after Bottesini's.

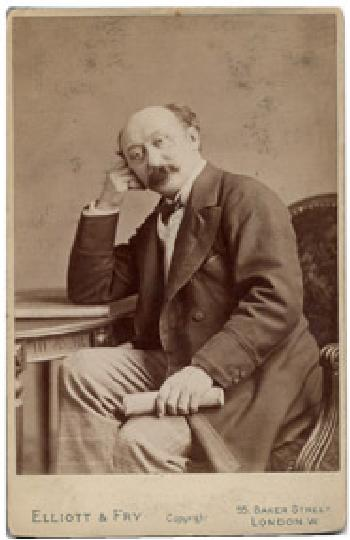
Luigi Arditi

The North-American pianist and composer Louis Moreau Gottschalk lived in Cuba from 1845 to 1862, and there he developed an important work as performer, conductor and composer. Gottschalk utilized Afro-Cuban elements of style in complex classical forms, such as a Caprice di Bravura based on the Cocoyé theme, as well as an opera titled Fiesta campestre Cubana (Cuban countryside feast).

About that opera Gottschalk wrote in his memoires: "Two months later (based on an offer made by the General-in Chief to put at my disposal all the military bands) I had, as I tell you, the idea to offer a great festival, and I came to an arrangement with the Italian Opera conductor, then in possession of the Great Tacón Theater. A contract in which he committed to provide the main soloists, all the choirs, and the entire orchestra, with the purpose to obtain a profit with the result. I set up to work and composed, based on some verses in Spanish written for me by a Havanese poet, an opera in one act titled Fête champêtre Cubaine (Cuban countryside feast)."

It is quite probable that Fiesta campestre Cubana would be the first opera that included elements of autochthonous Cuban music, because it is possible to clearly perceive in its music the Habanera-tango rhythm, previously utilized by Gottschalk so many times in other Cuban style pieces. Cristóbal Díaz Ayala says about this subject: "… "Escenas Campestres" presents a challenge: if it is the first Cuban opera or not; while Saumell envisioned for his "Antonelli" a text in Italian language, "Escenas Campestres" was written in Spanish, and its music has undoubtedly a certain creole flavor. But the critics, even from its time, and later, ignore this fact."

Gaspar Villate y Montes was born in Havana, in 1851 and since an early age he showed a great musical talent. As a child, he began to study piano with Nicolás Ruiz Espadero and in 1867, when he was just 16 years old, he composed his first opera on a drama by Victor Hugo, titled Angelo, tirano de Padua. A year later, at the beginning of the 1868 war, he travelled to the United States with his family and upon his return to Havana in 1871 he wrote another opera called Las primeras armas de Richelieu.

Villate travelled to France with the purpose to continue his music studies in the Paris Conservatory, where he received classes from Francois Bazin, Victorien de Joncieres and Adolphe Danhauser. He composed numerous instrumental pieces such as contradances, habaneras, romances and waltzes, and in 1877 he premiered with great audience acclaim his opera Zilia in Paris, which was presented in Havana in 1881. Since then, Villate focused his efforts mainly in opera and composed pieces such as La Zarina and Baltazar, premiered at La Haya and Teatro Real de Madrid respectively. It is known that he worked on an opera with a Cuban theme called Cristóbal Colón, which manuscript has been lost.

Villate died in Paris in 1891, soon after he had started to compose a lyric drama called Lucifer, from which some fragments have been preserved. We should mention Laureano Fuentes Matons, Hubert de Blanck and Ignacio Cervantes among the Cuban opera composers from the 19th century. Laureano Fuentes Matons was born on July 3, 1825, in Santiago de Cuba and studied with Juan París, Hierrezuelo and Casamitjana. He composed numerous orchestral and chamber works, as well as the opera Seila. Hubert de Blanck, Dutch pianist and composer established in Cuba, which founded a famous conservatory named after him, composed three operas titled Patria, Actea and Hicaona. According to Jorge Antonio González, Patria was the first Cuban opera based on the Independence Wars theme.

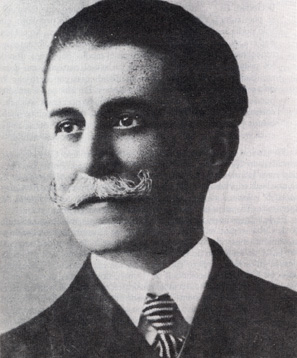
Ignacio Cervantes

One of the most important Cuban composers, Ignacio Cervantes, wrote the lyric drama Maledetto and the comic opera Los Saltimbanquis, which was premiered in the Albisu theater of Havana, on January 25, 1901. Cervantes began to compose Maledetto in 1895, and was able to complete only two acts before his death in 1905.

== 1901–1959 ==
At the beginning of the 20th century three composers stand out in regard to operistic production, Eduardo Sánchez de Fuentes, José Mauri Esteve and Bernardo Moncada.

Eduardo Sánchez de Fuentes was born in Havana in 1874, within an artistic family; his father was a writer and his mother a pianist and singer. He began his musical studies at Conservatorio Hubert de Blanck and at a later time took classes from Carlos Anckermann. He received also a Law Degree in 1894. When Sánchez de Fuentes was just 18 years old, he composed the famous Habanera "Tú", which became an extraordinary international success. Alejo Carpentier said it was: "the most famous Habanera".

On October 26, 1898, Sánchez de Fuentes premiered at the Albisu Theater in Havana his first opera called Yumuri, based on the Island's colonization theme. In it, an aborigine princess falls in love with a handsome Spanish conqueror, which abducts her at the wedding ceremony with another indigenous character. At the end, while escaping, both suffer a tragic death during an earthquake.

At a later time, Sánchez de Fuentes composed another five operas: El Náufrago (1901), Dolorosa (1910), Doreya (1918), El Caminante (1921) and Kabelia (1942).

José Mauri Esteve composed numerous zarzuelas for the Alhambra Theater and one opera in three acts called La Esclava, premiered on June 6, 1921, at the Teatro Nacional; and Bernardo Moncada, born in Trinidad, in 1888, composed the lyrical drama Pasión Criolla, as well as the operas Teresa or El grito de Yara and Amara or Los adoradores del sol.

Also during the first half of the 20th century, the renowned composer Amadeo Roldán (1900-1939) wrote a so-called gaelic opera [sic.] in three acts, titled Deirdre, from which he could only complete two acts before his premature death. His contemporary, Alejandro García Caturla composed the opera Manita en el suelo with a script from Alejo Carpentier, based on an Afro-Cuban theme. The best Cuban lyrical singer in the 20th century was the operatic tenor Francisco Fernandez Dominicis (Italian name: Francesco Dominici) (1885-1968). The mezzo-soprano Marta Perez was the best Cuban female lyrical singer in the 20th century (1924-2009). She sang in the famous Theater La Scala in Milan, Italy in 1955.

== 1960 to present ==
During the second half of the 20th century, the operistic production continued flourishing in Cuba, frequently incorporating modern composition technique, as well as contemporary themes. Natalio Galán, born in Camagüey, in 1919, composed the opera los días llenos on a script by Antón Arrufat, utilizing serial techniques; and his colleague from the Renovación Musical group, Hilario González composed two operas: Las puertas abiertas (1964) and Clausura de un pequeño burgués.

Among the members of the new generation of composers that began to produce mainly between the end of the 1950s and the beginning of the 1960s, we should mention Roberto Sánchez Ferrer, Héctor Angulo and José Loyola Fernández. Roberto Sánchez Ferrer (born 1927) composed an opera inspired on the biography of the Vietnamese communist guerrilla fighter Nguyễn Văn Trỗi, which was captured in 1963 when he was trying to install an explosive artifact with the purpose to assassinate the US DS Robert Mc Namara. He was executed at a later time. In that opera, called Van Troi, Sánchez Ferrer utilized Vietnamese melodies and serial techniques. Héctor Angulo (1932), composed a chamber opera titled Ibeyi Añá, based on an Afro-Cuban story by Lydia Cabrera; and José Loyola Fernández (1941) has an opera with an Afro-Cuban theme called Monzón y el Rey de Koré.

One of the most active and outstanding composers of his generation, Sergio Fernández Barroso (also known as Sergio Barroso) (1946), is the author of an opera called La forma del camino, which also possesses the complementary title of s-XIV-69 (which means Siglo XIV – 1969). With an approximate duration of 60 minutes, this piece utilizes as a script a story from the Popol Vuh (the sacred text of the Maya culture) about the mythic brothers Hunahpu and Ixbalanqué. The score includes soloists and a choir of nine mixed voices, accompanied by an instrumental group and an electro-acoustic quadraphonic system. The scene requires a stage elevated over the choir spatial position, which members wear dinner jackets, in opposition to the more casual attire of the soloists. All singers wear Indian masks.

Renowned Cuban composer Roberto Valera collaborated with American librettist Charles Koppelman on the opera Cubanacan, based on the ambitious architectural project of the National Art Schools (Cuba), located in the Havana Cubanacán neighborhood; site of the Havana Country Club before the 1959 Cuban Revolution. The opera was performed at the National Art Schools on the opening nights of the 2015 Havana Bienalle. This was the first premier of a new opera in Cuba since the revolution.

Part of a more recent generation, composer Juan Piñera (born 1949) includes in his catalogue two operas: Amor con amor se paga from 1987, which consists of two acts and is based on a text by José Martí; and La taza de café, composed in 1989, with two acts and script by Juan Ramón Amán based on a piece of the same name by Rolando Ferrer. Odaline de La Martínez (born 1949), Cuban composer established in Great Britain, has written an operatic trilogy based on an Afro-Caribbean theme.

Also Cuban-American composer Orlando Jacinto García (born 1954) is the author of an opera titled Transcending Time, for soprano, instrumental and vocal chamber ensemble, electro-acoustic media and video, which was premiered in the Zagreb Biennial in Croatia by the ensemble Cantus.

Most recently the work of two young Cuban composers stand out, Jorge Martín and Louis Franz Aguirre.

Jorge Martín was born in Santiago de Cuba in 1959 and established his residence in the US at a very young age. He studied musical composition at the Yale and Columbia Universities. He has composed three lyric pieces: "Beast and Superbeast", a series of four operas in one act each, based on short stories by Saki; Tobermory, opera in one act that obtained first prize in the Fifth Biennial of the National Opera Association (USA), and has been presented in several cities of the United States; and Before Night Falls, an opera based on the famous autobiography of the Cuban novelist, playwright and poet Reinaldo Arenas, renowned dissident from the Fidel Castro government.

Martín acquired the rights to the memoir in 1995 and spent 15 years working on the opera, which was finally premiered in 2010 by the Fort Worth Opera, its only performance so far. It got an overwhelmingly enthusiastic response from audiences, and mixed reviews. The National Review said it was "brave, both in its libretto and in its score… a worthy work of art; A moving story presented in a moving way."

Louis Franz Aguirre (born 1968) is currently one of the most prolific and renowned Cuban composers at an international level. His catalog includes four operatic works: Ebbó (1998), premiered on January 17, 1999, at the Brotfabrik Theater in Bonn, Germany; Ogguanilebbe (Liturgy of the divine word) (2005), premiered in the Salla dil Parlamento d'il Castello di Udine, Italy. Yo el Supremo (Comic play with Dictator in one Act), premiered on October 27, 2015, in the Teatro Galileo, Madrid, Spain and The way the dead love (Theogony: an operatic manifest), commissioned by the Lydenskab Ensemble and financed by KODA, Denmark. Premiered on February 24, 2017, in Godsbanen, Aarhus, Denmark, as part of the Århus European Capital of Culture 2017.

Louis Franz Aguirre has said about his opera Yo el Supremo (I, the Supreme):

From a compositional stand point, this piece is a step forward in my idea of an "instrumental drama" or the total instrument. As it is already usual in many of my previous works, the instrument player, indispensably virtuoso, is also performer, singer and actor simultaneously; the same musicians act and sing through all the story. It is like an opera without singers. It is a farce which I call "Comic play with Dictator in one Act". And the comic play (Sainete), like the genre in the Spanish Theater, is always a play of comic character; It is the same with my work, although in Yo el Supremo there is plenty of hidden tragedy behind those meanings and tricks. Sarcasm goes side by side with added pain, though only a few can perceive it. A clear musical example is the Marseillaise theme, associated with the French Revolution and liberty, but that here re-conceptualizes its original meaning to hide behind it the repression that all dictators exert over their people; always in the name of a supposed liberty that at the end only reduces all possible liberties to cero.

== See also ==
- Music of Cuba
