= Evelin Ramón =

Cuban composer and singer (born 1979)

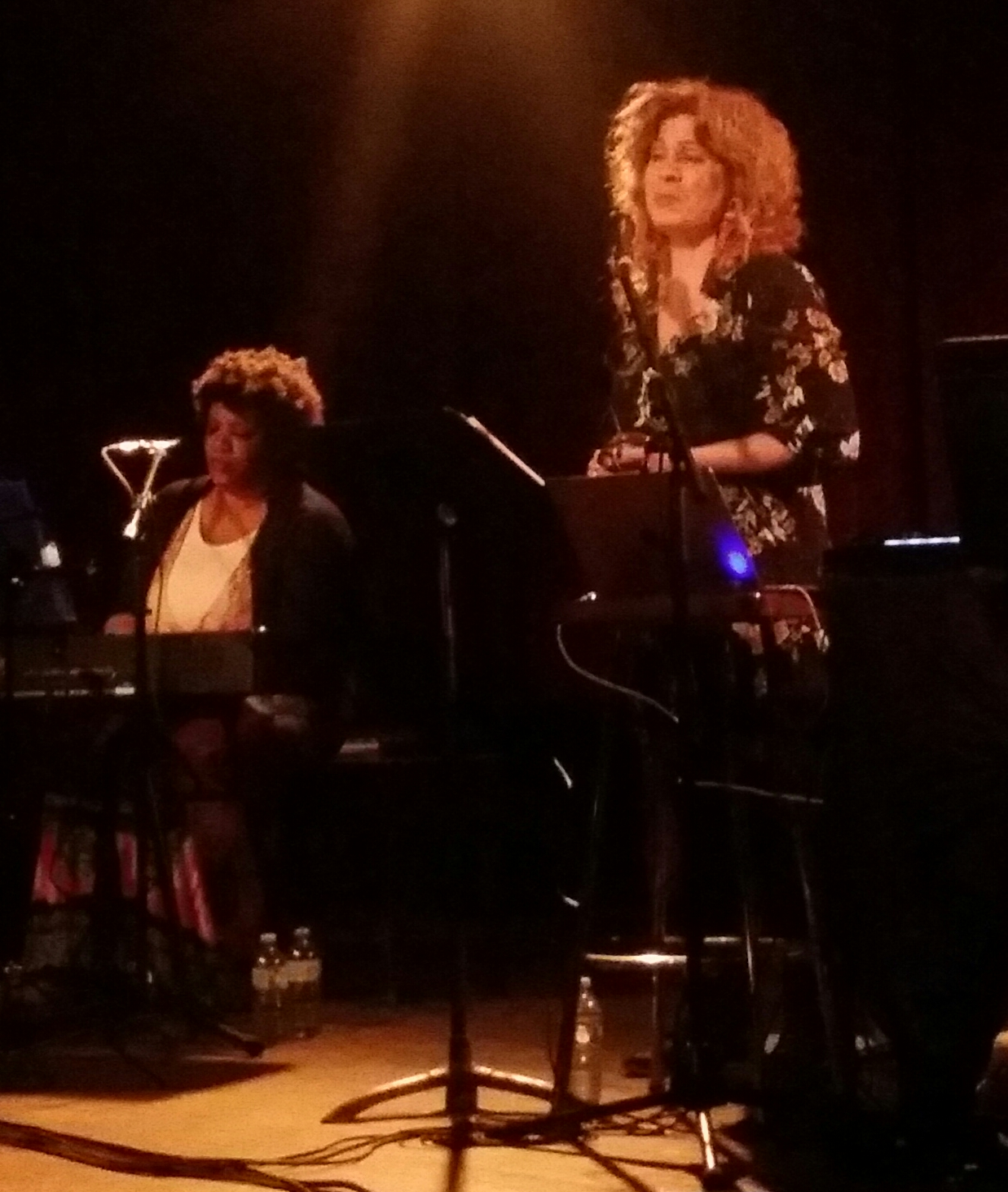
Evelin Ramon

Evelin Ramón (Santiago de Cuba, Cuba, 1979) is a prominent Cuban composer and singer.

== Academic background ==
Evelin Ramón studied piano, choral conduction, and singing at the Music Conservatoire in Santiago de Cuba and afterward continued studying musical composition at the University of the Arts in Havana under the supervision of composers Juan Piñera and Louis Franz Aguirre.

Ramón obtained a Masters diploma in Musical Composition at the Université de Montréal, under the guidance of composer Ana Sokilovic. In 2012, she was granted a residence scholarship to study musical composition at the Faculty of Music of the Université de Montréal, which allowed her to collaborate with the project “Danser la musique d’aujourd’hui” (Dance today's music) in collaboration with L’École de Danse Contemporaine de Montréal, for which she composed a piece named Souffles for female voice, electro-acoustic media, and 21 dancers.

Ramón has participated in professional development programs such as the "VII Encuentro de Compositores Injuve" in Spain (2002) and the "Rencontres de Musique Nouvelle au Domaine Forget" (2012). She has also participated in courses and seminars of musical analysis, orchestration, and composition, offered by important composers such as Stefano Bracci, Mauricio Sotelo, Beat Furrer, Philippe Leroux, John Rea, Denys Bouliane, Lasse Thoresen y Hugues Leclair. She currently continues her Doctorate studies in musical composition at the Université de Montréal with composer Pierre Michaud.

== Professional activity ==
The compositions of Evelin Ramón have been presented in Canadá, Spain, Germany, Venezuela, France, Mexico, Denmark, Greenland, United States, Chile and Cuba, and have been performed by renowned professional ensembles and musicians such as: Les Percussions de Strasbourg, Le Nouvel Ensemble Moderne (NEM), Sixtrum, the Transmission Ensemble, the Continuum Contemporary Music, the Orchestre de l'Université de Montréal under the baton of François Rivest and Les Grands Vents de Montréal, conducted by David Martin. Her current line of work involves performance, composition, improvisation, and teaching.

Evelin Ramón is currently a Council member of the Canadian League of Composers (CLC) and co-hosts the radio program "Pulsar" in CISM 89.3, Montréal, Canada; entirely dedicated to contemporary music.

Her recent recording production "Cendres" (Ashes) for voice and electro-acoustic media was launched on November 24, 2017, within the activities of a concert organized by New Music Edmonton, Alberta, Canada.

== Awards and recognitions ==
Evelin Ramón has received numerous awards and recognition for her professional labor, such as the First Prize in Musical Composition within the "Festival de Música de la Universidad de Las Artes (Havana, Cuba). The Havana First Prize in Musical Composition, as well as the composition prizes from the Orchestre de l'Université de Montréal (2010) and the Serge-Garant Contest (2011).

In 2014, Evelin Ramón was selected to participate in the Project Génération 2014, along with three other young Canadian composers. That award allowed her to compose a piece that was premiered by the Ensemble Contemporain de Montréal (ECM+), conducted by Véronique Lacroix. In 2017, she was selected to participate in the PIVOT project, organized by the Canadian League of Composers (CLC), in conjunction with the Canadian Music Centre (CMC) and the Continuum Contemporary Music.

== See also ==
Music of Cuba
