= Tieles =

Tieles is a surname. Notable people with the surname include:

- Cecilio Tieles (born 1942), Cuban pianist, professor and musicologist
- Evelio Tieles (born 1941), Cuban violinist and professor
