= Magaly Ruiz =

Cuban musician and composer (born 1941)

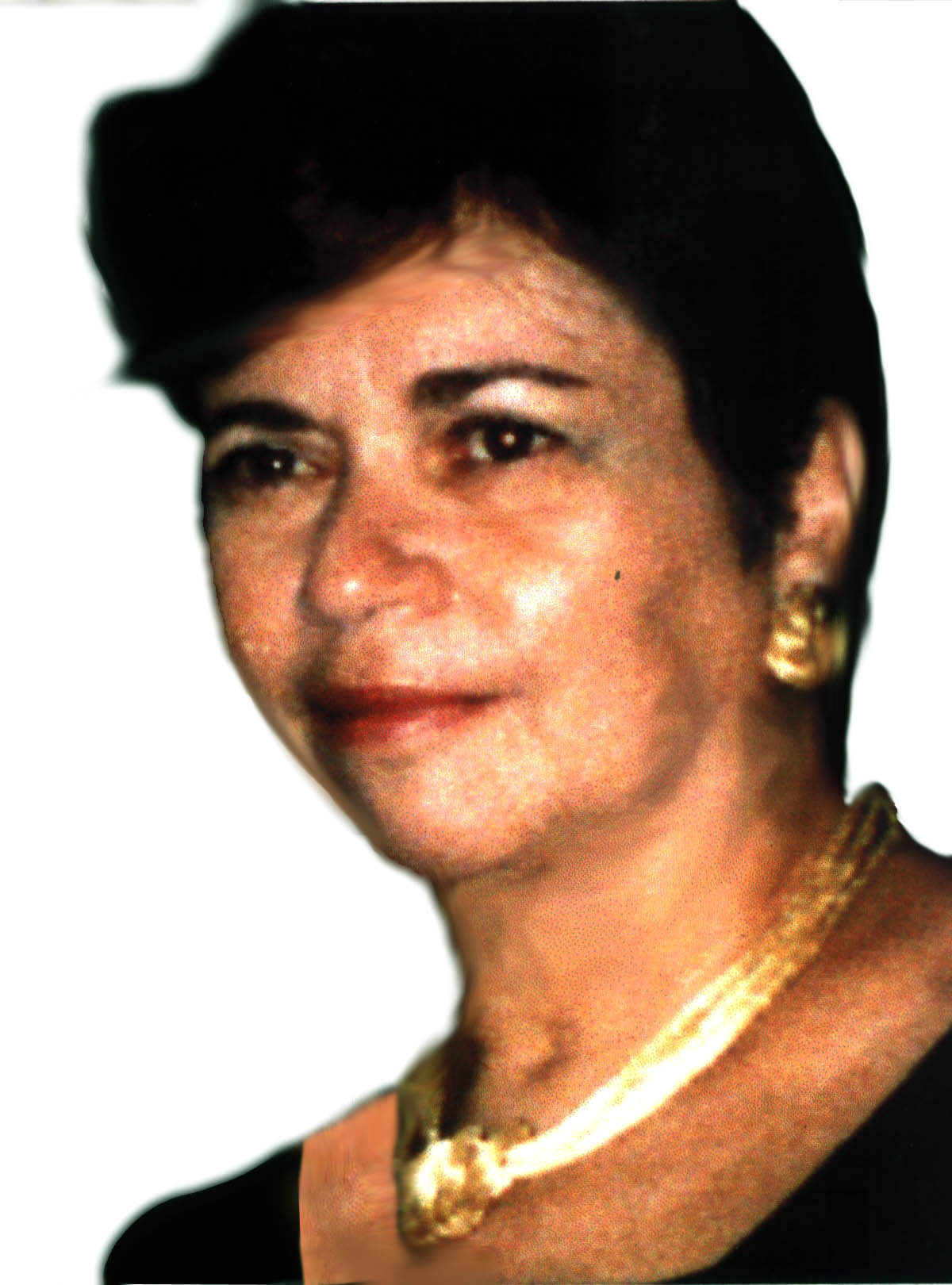
Magaly Ruiz Lastres

Doris Magaly Ruiz Lastres (born 1941) is a Cuban musician and composer. Her compositions have been performed at a number of international music festivals.

== Life ==
Magaly Ruiz was born in Santa Clara, Cuba, in 1941. In 1981, she graduated with a degree in Composition from the Instituto Superior de Arte de La Habana, where she studied with Harold Gramatges, César Pérez Sentenat, José Ardévol, Félix Guerrero, Alfredo Diez Nieto, Dolores Torres and Roberto Valera.

== Works ==
Ruiz' curriculum is published in prestigious dictionaries such as The Grove Dictionary of Music and Musicians and Diccionario Iberoamericano de la Música. Several of her compositions are included as part of the curriculum of the leading music education institutions in Cuba, among them, the Conservatorio Amadeo Roldán, the Instituto Superior de Arte de La Habana, the Instituto Superior Pedagógico Enrique José Varona and Conservatorio Alejandro Garcia Caturla. Her compositions have been performed at many festivals such as the International Musical Festival, Festival de La Habana, Festival Boleros de Oro, International Festival of Contemporary Music, the International Festival Donne in Musica in Fiuggi, Italy and the Festival Sounds of Americas, New York City, United States. She has received the First Award in the music contests Concurso "La Edad de Oro", Concurso de la Dirección Nacional de Enseñanza Artística, Concurso Amadeo Roldán and the Concurso de la "Unión Nacional de Escritores y Artistas de Cuba".

She has also been awarded several medals and honours, among them The Medalla por la Educación Cubana, Medalla al Mérito Pedagógico, Medalla José Tey, Distinción Especial of the Cuban Ministry of Education, and the Premio Anual de Composición of the Unión Nacional de Escritores y Artistas de Cuba to the total created work of a composer.

== Catalogue Symphonic Music ==
Symphonic Music

- Tres piezas para pequeña orquesta, 1977
- Estructura tritemática para orquesta sinfónica, 1977
- Concierto para oboe y orquesta, 1979
- Tres ambientes sonoros, 1981

Chamber Music

- Trío, 1976
- Sonata para chelo y piano, 1977
- Juegos con metales, 1977
- Movimientos para cuarteto de cuerdas No. 1, 1978
- Canción para un amigo, saxofón, contralto y piano, 1978.
- Tres piezas cubanas, violín y piano, 1978
- Movimiento para cuarteto de cuerdas No. 2, 1980
- Variaciones en habanera, para oboe y piano, 1983
- Variaciones en habanera, versión para flauta y piano, 1995
- Tres piezas, trombón y piano, 1994
- Fantasía, violín y piano, 1994
- Yugo y Estrella, cuarteto de cuerdas, 1995
- Dos para tres, flauta y piano, 1995
- Tres piezas cubanas, flauta y piano, 1995
- Cuasi Danzón, trombón y piano, 1996
- Dos piezas cubanas para clarinete, 1997
- Danzón, para cello y piano, 1998
- Tema con variaciones para trombón 1998
- Danzón para saxofón tenor, 1998
- Habanera, para guitarra, 1998
- Dos piezas para clarinete, 1998

Choir

- Altura y pelos, coro mixto, texto: César Vallejo, 1976
- Al oído de una muchacha, texto: García Lorca, coro mixto, 1976
- Canción para dos pueblos (habanera y guajira), coro mixto,1994
- A Ili, coro femenino, 1995
- A Glaimí (cinco piezas), coro infantil, 1996

Piano

- Tres preludios para piano, 1978
- Tres estudios cubanos para piano, 1980
- Estudios cubanos del 4 al 12, 1978
- Pequeñas piezas cubanas, 1988
- Piezas a cuatro manos (primera serie), 1990
- Piezas a cuatro manos (segunda serie), 1994
- Estudio en mambo No. 13, 1994
- 20 Miniaturas cubanas para piano, 1995

Voice and Piano

- Pueblo entre lomas (guajira), 1966
- A Víctor Jara, (canción), 1978
- Dos canciones para niños: Abuelita, Trota que trota mi caballito, 1984
- Tríptico Homenaje: Te recuerdo en un canto, Mi mariposa, Esa cabeza blanca, mezzo-soprano y piano, 1985
- Corazón no me traiciones más, bolero, 1994
- Cómo te quiero, bolero, 1994
- Con tu piel y con tu cuerpo, bolero, 1995
- Te ha besado, 1998
