= René Touzet =

Cuban composer, pianist and bandleader (1916–2003)

Background information
- Born: René Touzet y Monte; September 8, 1916; Havana, Cuba
- Died: June 23, 2003 (aged 86) Miami, Florida, United States
- Genres: Cha Cha, classical
- Occupations: Composer, pianist, bandleader
- Instrument: Piano
- Years active: 1930s–1960s
- Labels: Capitol, RCA, Fiesta, GNP Crescendo

René Touzet y Monte (September 8, 1916, in Havana, Cuba – June 15, 2003, in Miami, Florida) was a Cuban composer, pianist and bandleader.

== Career as bandleader ==
Growing up in the city of Cojimar, Touzet learned classical piano from the age of four, and went on to study at the Falcón Conservatory in Havana. By 1934, then 18 years old, Touzet's classical training had to end due to his parents' financial hardships. However, as his jazz piano skills were, by then, clearly apparent, he accepted a job performing and playing in Luis Rivera's jazz band. Soon thereafter, he would become the leader of a 16-piece jazz orchestra, playing big band shows at the Grand Casino in Havana. He also began writing his own compositions; one of his most famous songs, "No Te Importe Saber" ('You don't care to know'), was recorded with lyrics (by Mitchell Parish) as "Let Me Love You Tonight" by Bing Crosby, Frank Sinatra and Dean Martin, among others.

Touzet also continued his musical education, undertaking additional studies with Prof. César Pérez Sentenat, Joaquín Nin, and Italian composer Mario Castelnuovo-Tedesco. He was also a student of composer Hal Overtone in New York City and musicologist Frank Cooper in Miami.

In 1944, aged 28, his Cuban nightclub was destroyed in a hurricane, which led to Touzet relocating to the United States, where he joined a band led by Enric Madriguera. The band then relocated to the west coast, to Hollywood, where he met Desi Arnaz and played with his band for a time. He also worked as pianist, songwriter and arranger with Xavier Cugat and Stan Kenton.

GNP 113 – "El Loco Cha Cha" (1956)

After forming his own jazz orchestra in the mid-1950s, he successfully recorded eleven albums with producer Gene Norman on his GNP Crescendo label over a nine-year period between 1955–1964, and performed regularly at Norman's Crescendo nightclub. One of his best-known arrangements of this period, "El Loco Cha Cha", provided R&B singer Richard Berry with the basis, or "riff", for his classic pop song "Louie Louie". Touzet remained a popular bandleader through the 1960s, incorporating pachangas and other new rhythms into his compositions, without losing touch with the boleros and cha-cha rhythms that first brought him fame.

== Later years and family ==
In 1972, then aged 58, Touzet retired from performing live music and relocated to Miami, Florida, devoting his remaining years to composing for the piano, mainly in a style blending Cuban folk music and jazz with classical sounds. His published compositions for piano include Cuarenta Danzas, Cuatro Caprichos, Ginasteriana, Fantasía Española, Cinco Danzas Exóticas, Vals Arabesco, Tres Miniaturas, and the Sonata Romántica.

Touzet was married to Isabel González (b. 1917, d. 1991), with whom he had two daughters, Olivia and Nilda Touzet-González. He also had three other daughters, singer Olga María Touzet-Guillot (with singer Olga Guillot), Lisa Bahadoor, and Bonita Calderón. He later married Mercy Remos.

Touzet was given several special honors and awards for his musical contributions. In 2001, the mayor of Miami declared September 9 as "René Touzet Day." He died of heart complications in 2003.

In 2018, Touzet was inducted into the Latin American Songwriters Hall of Fame and posthumously given the "La Musa" ('the muse') award, which was accepted by his daughter, Olga María, who also gave a stirring musical performance in her father's honor at the awards ceremony.

== Selected discography ==
=== RCA Victor records ===
- Dinner in Havana (LPM-1016, 1954)

=== GNP Crescendo records ===
- The Cha Cha Cha and the Mambo [also released as The Charm of the Cha Cha Cha] (GNP-14, 1955)
- From Broadway to Havana (GNP-22, 1957)
- Cha Cha Cha for Lovers (GNP-29, 1957)
- Mr. Cha Cha Cha (GNP-36, 1958)
- René Touzet and His Orchestra Play for Dancing at the Crescendo on the World Famous Sunset Strip (GNP-40, 1959)
- Touzet Too Much! (GNP-49, 1960)
- The Timeless Ones a la Touzet (GNP-52, 1961)
- La Pachanga (GNP-57, 1961)
- Pachanga Differente! (GNP-61, 1961)
- Greatest Latin Hits! (GNP-74, 1962) compilation
- Touzet Goes to the Movies (GNP-81, 1962)
- Bossa Nova! Brazil to Hollywood (GNP-87, 1963)
- The Best of René Touzet and His Orchestra (GNPS-2000, 1964) compilation

=== SEECO records ===
- Beso de Fuego (7212 A, 19??)
- Hijo Mio (7212 B, 19??)
- No Puedo Ser Feliz (7728, 19??)
- Pensando en Ti (7172 A, 19??)
- Pretender (7293 A, 19??)
- Punal en el Alma (7728, 19??)
- Noche Azul (7729, 19??)
- No Te Importe Saber (7729, 19??)
- Te Quiero (7172 B, 19??)
- Yo Volvere (7293 B, 19??)

== External links and main source ==
- René Touzet – official site
- René Touzet discography at Discogs
- René Touzet discography
- Enrique Hernandez, "Sunset on a Golden Age", The Miami Herald, October 8, 2007
- Audio recordings of – Rene Touzet and his Orchestra with vocalists: Elsa Miranda, Reinaldo Henriquez and Irene Valencia on Archive.org
