= National Symphony Orchestra of Cuba =

The National Symphony Orchestra of Cuba is the main institution dedicated to the performance of classical music in Cuba.

== History ==
The establishment of a symphony orchestra in Havana had been a long-standing goal for many passionate musicians. Earlier efforts included Modesto Julián’s founding of the Havana Concert Society in 1880, which maintained a permanent ensemble of 80 musicians. Other contributions came from José Agustín Martín, who led the Popular Concert Society, and Guillermo Tomás, who created the first Havana Symphony Orchestra (Spanish: Orquesta Sinfónica de la Habana) in 1910. However, Tomás’s orchestra was only able to perform six times, all at the National Theater, under the baton of composer Gonzalo Roig.

In 1921, Roig—who was part of the orchestra at the former Campoamor Theater—joined forces with Ernesto Lecuona, José María Arríete, Manuel Duchesne Morillas, and other musicians to protest against theater owners and managers. Their advocacy reflected the broader struggle to sustain a permanent symphony orchestra in the Cuban capital.

The second iteration of the Havana Symphony Orchestra was officially founded on October 29, 1922, marking the occasion when Maestro Ernesto Lecuona performed as a soloist with an orchestra for the first time.

The Havana Philharmonic Orchestra, succeeding the Havana Symphony Orchestra, was founded on March 14, 1924, and established by a group of prominent musicians, including Antonio Mompó, César Pérez Sentenat, Amadeo Roldán, and the Spanish composer Pedro Sanjuán Nortes, who served as its first conductor. The orchestra performed its very first concert a few months later, on June 8, 1924, at the Teatro Nacional. It was disbanded some time during the Cuban Revolution by the incoming Communist government.

The National Symphony Orchestra of Cuba was then founded on October 7, 1959 by the conductors Enrique González Mántici and Manuel Duchesne Cuzán.

== Music, style, and concerts ==
The activities of the orchestra include regular season concerts as well as Symphonic-Choral concerts, didactical concerts cycles, national tours and the support to lyrical presentations and ballet. We can also mention the recording of soundtracks, record productions and the participation in national and international events.

The orchestra has been conducted by numerous national and international Concert Masters, such as: Francesco Belli, Carmine Coppola, Luis de Pablo, Álvaro Manzano, Manuel Duchesne Cuzán, Tomás Fortín, Yoshikazu Fukumura, Enrique González Mántici, Luis Gorelik, Camargo Guarnieri, Félix Guerrero, Michel Legrand, Joel Mathias Jenny, Jean-Paul Pénin, Gonzalo Romeu, Bernard Rubinstein, David Harutyunyan, Roberto Sánchez Ferrer and Hans Werner Henze.

It has also presented a large number of renowned soloists from Cuba and abroad, among whom we can mention: Zuill Bailey, José Carreras, Joaquín Clerch, Costas Cotsiolis, Victoria de los Ángeles, Frank Fernández (pianist), Eric Grossman, Víctor Pellegrini, Iván Petruzziello, Jorge Luis Prats, İdil Biret, Francesco Manara, Mistislav Rostropovich, Chucho Valdés, José María Vitier, Sergio Vitier, Miguel Villafruela and Roger Woodward.

Since its inception, The National Symphony Orchestra of Cuba has made an important effort to promote Cuban music. In its concerts numerous contemporary pieces have been premiered, such as: "La tradición se rompe, pero cuesta trabajo" and "Concierto para guitarra y orquesta No. 1", by Leo Brouwer, "Muros, rejas y vitrales" by Carlos Fariñas, "Contrapunto Espacial" by Juan Blanco, "Conjuro" by Roberto Valera, "Oda al soldado muerto" by Sergio Barroso and "Ciclos" by Armando Rodríguez Ruidíaz.

The orchestra regularly features many Cuban conductors such as: Zenaida Romeu, Iván del Prado, Guido López-Gavilán, Jorge López Marín and Leo Brouwer, as well as his Chief Conductor, Enrique Pérez Mesa. The National Symphony Orchestra of Cuba has its permanent headquarters at the "Auditorio Amadeo Roldán" Theater in Havana.
