= Opera seria =

Style of Italian opera

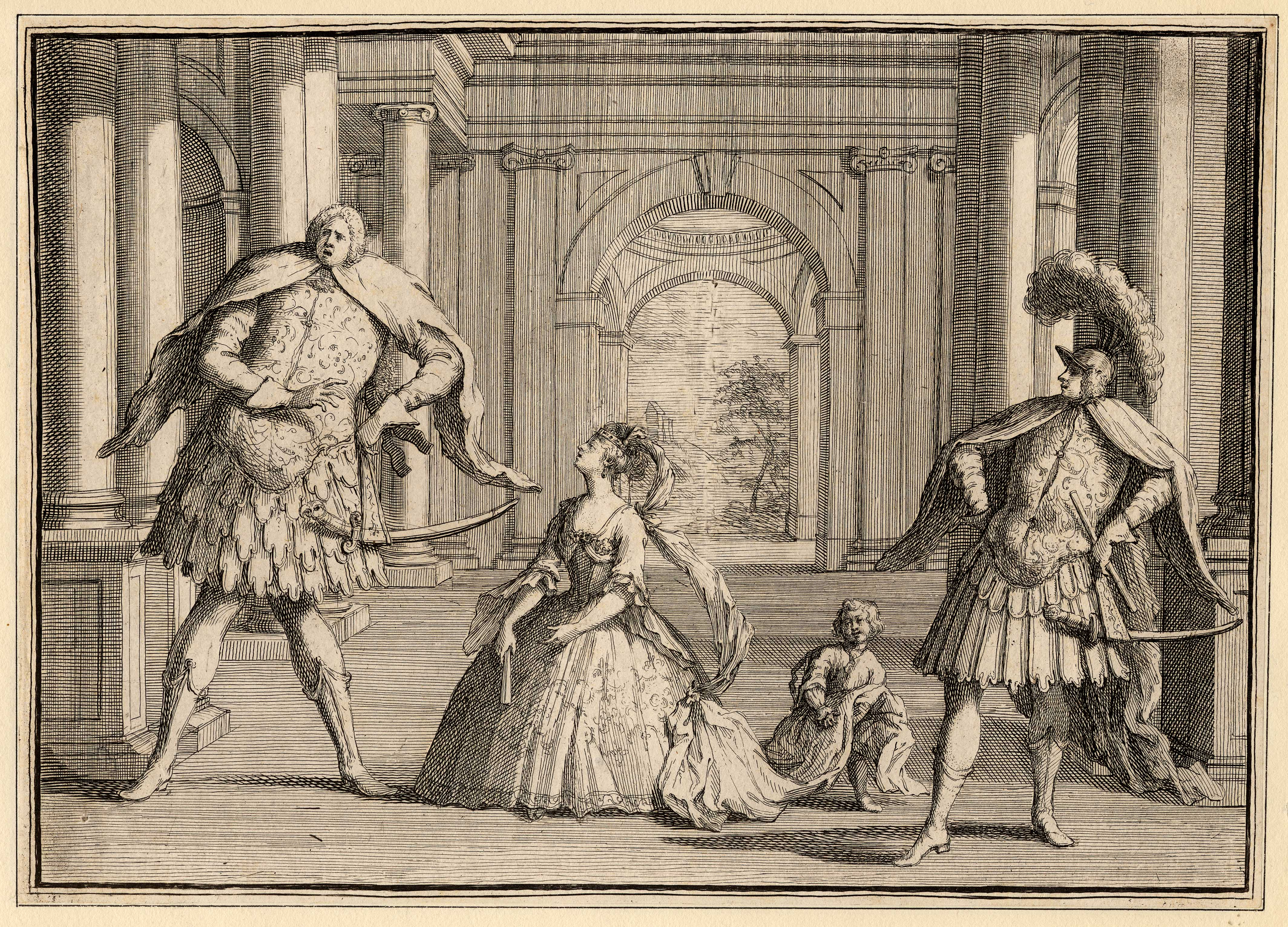
Caricature of a performance of Handel's Flavio, featuring three of the best-known opera seria singers of their day: Senesino on the left, diva Francesca Cuzzoni in the centre, and art-loving castrato Gaetano Berenstadt on the right

Opera seria (Italian pronunciation: [ˈɔːpera ˈsɛːrja]; plural: opere serie; usually called dramma per musica or melodramma serio) is an Italian musical term which refers to the noble and "serious" style of Italian opera that predominated in Europe from the 1710s to about 1770. The term itself was rarely used at the time and only attained common usage once opera seria was becoming unfashionable and beginning to be viewed as something of a historical genre. The popular rival to opera seria was opera buffa, the 'comic' opera that took its cue from the improvisatory commedia dell'arte. An opera seria had a historical or Biblical subject, whereas an opera buffa had a contemporary subject.

Italian opera seria (invariably to Italian libretti) was produced not only in Italy but almost throughout Europe, and beyond (see Opera in Latin America, Opera in Cuba e. g.). Among the main centres in Europe were the court operas based in Warsaw (since 1628), Munich (founded in 1653), London (established in 1662), Vienna (firmly established 1709; first operatic representation: Il pomo d'oro, 1668), Dresden (since 1719) as well as other German residences, Saint Petersburg (Italian opera reached Russia in 1731, first opera venues followed c. 1742), Madrid (see Spanish opera), and Lisbon. Opera seria was less popular in France, where the national genre of French opera (or tragédie en musique) was preferred.

Acclaimed composers of opera seria included George Frideric Handel, Johann Adolph Hasse, Antonio Caldara, Alessandro Scarlatti, Antonio Lotti, Attilio Ariosti, Antonio Vivaldi, Giovanni Bononcini, Nicola Porpora, Leonardo Vinci, Francesco Feo, Leonardo Leo, Baldassare Galuppi, Giovanni Battista Pergolesi and in the second half of the 18th century Christoph Willibald Gluck, Josef Mysliveček, Wolfgang Amadeus Mozart, Joseph Haydn, Johann Christian Bach, Carl Heinrich Graun, Florian Leopold Gassmann, Niccolò Jommelli, Tommaso Traetta, Pasquale Anfossi, Pietro Alessandro Guglielmi, Antonio Salieri, Giuseppe Bonno, Antonio Sacchini, Giuseppe Sarti, Niccolò Piccinni, Giovanni Paisiello, and Domenico Cimarosa.

By far the most successful librettist of the era was Metastasio, whose work came to define the form. Others included Apostolo Zeno, Benedetto Pamphili, Silvio Stampiglia, Antonio Salvi, Pietro Pariati, Pietro Ottoboni, Stefano Benedetto Pallavicino, Nicola Francesco Haym, Domenico Lalli, Paolo Rolli, Giovanni Claudio Pasquini, Ranieri de' Calzabigi and Giovanni Ambrogio Migliavacca.

== Structure ==
Opera seria built upon the conventions of the High Baroque era by developing and exploiting the da capo aria, with its A–B–A form. The first section presented a theme, the second a complementary one, and the third a repeat of the first with ornamentation and elaboration of the music by the singer. As the genre developed and arias grew longer, a typical opera seria would contain not more than thirty musical movements.

A typical opera would start with an instrumental overture of three movements (fast-slow-fast), the so-called "Italian overture", though often termed a sinfonia in the period. Following that would then be a series of recitatives in verso sciolto (freely alternating unrhymed seven- and eleven-syllable lines) containing dialogue, interspersed with arias in rhymed verse expressing the emotions of the character, this pattern only broken by the occasional duet for the leading amatory couple. The recitative was typically secco: that is, accompanied only by continuo (usually harpsichord, theorbo, and cello, sometimes supported by further bass and chordal instruments). At moments of especially violent passion secco was replaced by stromentato (or accompagnato) recitative, where the singer was accompanied by the entire body of strings.

Arias were scored for strings as well as continuo, and often included oboes, bassoons, horns, and occasionally flutes and/or recorders. More specific instrumentation could be called for, e.g. Cleopatra's aria V'adoro pupille from Handel's Giulio Cesare is scored for solo oboe, muted violins, viola, viola da gamba, and a continuo group made of harp as well as theorbo, bassoon and cello, in addition to the usual orchestral strings and basso continuo.

The arias were placed at the end of scenes, such that after singing the aria, the character usually exited the stage, encouraging the audience to applaud. Each scene generally had a stable number of characters on the stage. Occasionally, a short non-ternary cavatina would be written into a scene, before the same singer embarked on a full-length da capo exit aria. The leading singers each expected their fair share of arias of varied mood, be they sad, angry, heroic or meditative. Arias in the same style or key could not follow one another; and according to librettist Carlo Goldoni in his 1787 autobiography:

The author of the words must ... take care that two pathetic [i.e. melancholy] arias do not succeed one another. He must distribute with the same precaution the bravura arias, the arias of action, the inferior arias, and the minuets and rondeaus. He must, above all things, avoid giving impassioned arias, bravura arias, or rondeaus, to inferior characters.

Among these styles of aria used in opera seria, the following fivefold classification was given by John Brown in his 1789 work Letters upon the Poetry and Music of the Italian Opera:

- Aria di bravura / Aria d’agilità
- Aria cantabile
- Aria di mezzo carattere
- Aria parlante / Aria di strepito
- Aria di portamento

A fourfold classification using aria d'affetto, grouping aria di portamento with aria parlante, is also seen. These are supplemented by the following, which could be classified into more than one of the above, but are distinguished by instrumentation (concertata, unisono) or textual considerations (imitazione):

- Aria concertata
- Aria d'imitazione / simile aria
- Aria all'unisono

Opere serie were structured into three acts; at the end of Act III they would conclude with a final upbeat chorus (lieto fine, literally a "happy ending"), with all the characters to celebrate the jubilant climax.

== Voices ==
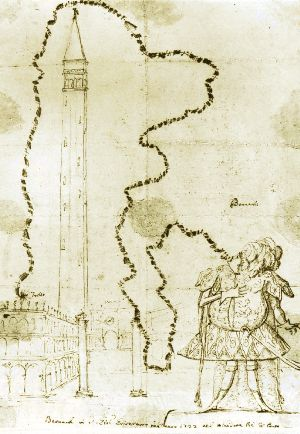
Caricature of the castrato singer Antonio Bernacchi by Antonio Maria Zanetti, 1723. The florid line implies that the cadenza is overly long, and ascends higher than the campanile of St Mark's Basilica. It ends with the characteristic trill.

The age of opera seria corresponded with the rise to prominence of the castrati, often prodigiously gifted male singers who had undergone castration before puberty in order to retain a high, powerful soprano or alto voice backed by decades of rigorous musical training. They were cast in heroic male roles, the male lead being known as the primo uomo, alongside another new breed of operatic creature, the female lead or prima donna. These two would usually form the main romantic couple of the plot, and duets were assigned almost exclusively to this couple. It was common for the rest of the principal characters to be dominated by soprano and alto voices. Typically, the one tenor or bass voice was given a major patriarchal or monarchical role. For example, compare the role of Roman Emperor Titus in Metastasio's La Clemenza di Tito from Caldara's 1723 setting for alto castrato, with Gluck's 1752 setting and Mozart's 1791 setting, both for tenors.

The rise of these star singers with formidable technical skills spurred composers to write increasingly complex vocal music, and many operas of the time were written as vehicles for specific singers. Of these the most famous is perhaps Farinelli, whose debut in 1722 was guided by Nicola Porpora. Though Farinelli did not sing for Handel, his main rival, Senesino, did. Although spectacular coloratura was part of the reason that audiences flocked to opera houses to see, such long showy cadenzas, sometimes on inappropriately mundane words, were regularly lampooned.

By the middle of the eighteenth century, the importance of the arias to the public and the practice of tailoring roles for the performers gave star singers extraordinary power to dictate their requirements. Aria substitutions became common, turning the form into a sort of pasticcio. The number, emotional range and technical requirements of the arias reinforced a hierarchy within the opera company. Note though that the lead may not necessarily be the title role; for example, in the 1724 premiere season of Handel's Tamerlano, the primo uomo Senesino played the role of Andronico, the romantic lead; the second castrato Andrea Pacini took the title role.

== History ==
=== Origins ===
The dramaturgy of opera seria developed largely as a response to French criticism of what were often viewed as impure and corrupting librettos. As response, the Rome-based Pontifical Academy of Arcadia sought to return Italian opera to what they viewed as neoclassical principles, obeying the classical unities of drama, defined by Aristotle, and replacing "immoral" plots, such as Busenello's for L'incoronazione di Poppea, with highly moral narratives that aimed to instruct, as well as entertain. However, the often tragic endings of classical drama were rejected out of a sense of decorum: early writers of opera seria librettos such as Apostolo Zeno felt that virtue should be rewarded and shown triumphant, while the antagonists were to be put on their way to remorse. The spectacle and ballet, so common in French opera, were banished.

=== 1720–1740 ===
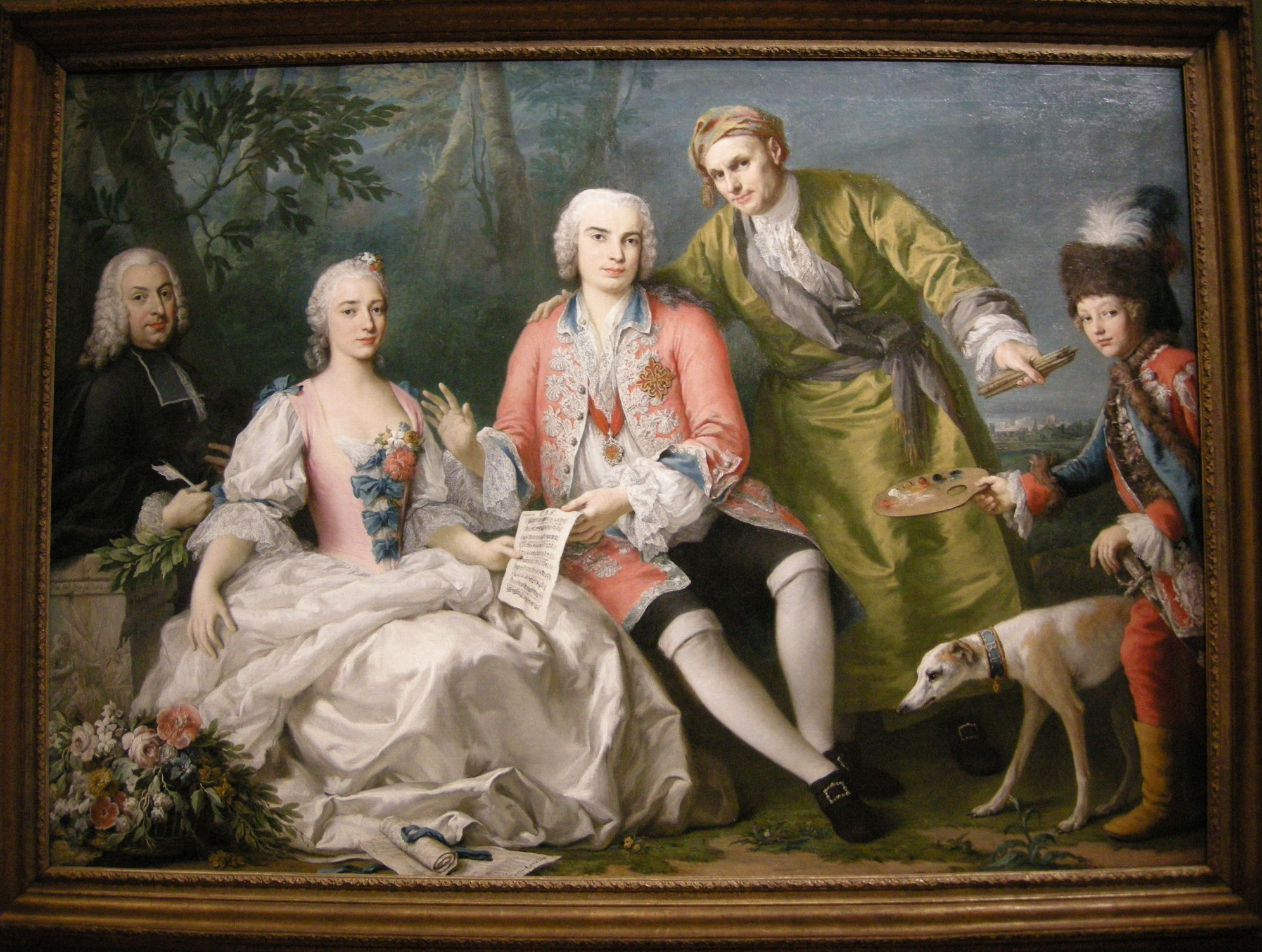
Jacopo Amigoni: Il cantante Farinelli con amici (among which Metastasio), c. 1752 (National Gallery of Victoria, Melbourne)

Opera seria acquired definitive form early during the 1720s. While Apostolo Zeno and Alessandro Scarlatti had paved the way, the genre truly came to fruition due to Metastasio and later composers. Metastasio's career began with the serenata Gli orti esperidi ("The Gardens of the Hesperides"). Nicola Porpora (much later to be Haydn's master) set the work to music, and the success was so great that the famed Roman prima donna, Marianna Bulgarelli, nicknamed "La Romanina", sought out Metastasio, and took him on as her protégé. Under her wing, Metastasio produced libretto after libretto, and they were rapidly set by the greatest composers in Italy and Austria, establishing the transnational tone of opera seria: Didone abbandonata, Catone in Utica, Ezio, Alessandro nelle Indie, Semiramide riconosciuta, Siroe and Artaserse.

After 1730 he succeeded Zeno as court poet in Vienna, and turned out more librettos for the imperial theater, until the mid-1740s: Adriano in Siria, Demetrio, Issipile, Demofoonte, Olimpiade, La clemenza di Tito, Achille in Sciro, Temistocle, Il re pastore and what he regarded as his finest libretto, Attilio Regolo.

For the librettos, Metastasio and his imitators customarily drew on dramas featuring classical characters from antiquity bestowed with princely values and morality, struggling with conflicts between love, honour and duty, in elegant and ornate language that could be performed equally well as both opera and non-musical drama. On the other hand, Handel, working far outside the mainstream genre and far from the court, set only a few Metastasio libretti for his London audience, preferring a greater diversity of texts, such as those from Nicola Francesco Haym, Antonio Salvi and Antonio Maria Lucchini. He frequently made use of adapted libretti from Apostolo Zeno and earlier.

At this time the leading Metastasian composers were Hasse, Caldara, Vinci, Bononcini, Leo, Porpora, and Pergolesi. Vinci's settings of Didone abbandonata and Artaserse were much praised for their stromento recitative, and he played a crucial part in establishing the new style of melody. Hasse, by contrast, indulged in stronger accompaniment and was regarded at the time as the more adventurous of the two. Pergolesi was noted for his lyricism. The main challenge for all was achieving variety, a break from the pattern of recitativo secco and aria da capo. The mutable moods of Metastasio's librettos helped, as did innovations made by the composer, such as stromento recitative or cutting a ritornello. During this period the choice of keys to reflect certain emotions became standardized: D minor became the choice key for a composer's typical "rage" aria, while D major for pomp and bravura, G minor for pastoral effect and E-flat major for pathetic effect, became the usual options.

=== 1740–1770 ===
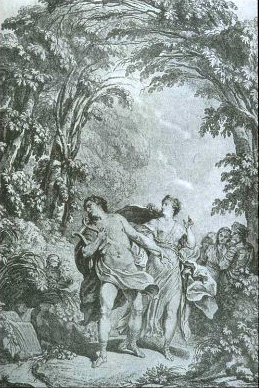
Illustration from a 1764 edition of the score of Gluck's Orfeo ed Euridice

After peaking during the 1750s, the popularity of the Metastasian model began to wane. New trends, popularized by composers such as Niccolò Jommelli and Tommaso Traetta, began to seep into opera seria. The Italianate pattern of alternating, sharply-contrasted recitative and aria began to give way to ideas from the French operatic tradition. Jommelli's works from 1740 onwards increasingly favored accompanied recitative and greater dynamic contrast, as well as a more prominent role for the orchestra while limiting virtuosic vocal displays. Traetta reintroduced the ballet in his operas and restored the tragic, melodramatic endings of classical dramas. His operas, particularly after 1760, also gave a larger role to the chorus.

The culmination of these reforms arrived in the operas of Christoph Willibald Gluck. Beginning with Orfeo ed Euridice (1762), Gluck drastically cut back on the possibilities for vocal virtuosity afforded to singers, abolished secco recitative (thereby heavily reducing the delineation between aria and recitative), and took great care to unify drama, dance, music, and theatrical practice in the synthesis of Italian and French traditions. He continued his reform with Alceste (1767) and Paride ed Elena (1770). Gluck paid great attention to orchestration and considerably increased the role of the chorus: he also cut back heavily on exit arias. The labyrinthine subplots that had riddled earlier baroque opera were eliminated. In 1768, the year after Gluck's Alceste, Jommelli and his librettist Verazi produced Fetonte. Ensemble and chorus are predominant: the usual number of exit arias slashed in half. For the most part, however, these trends did not become mainstream until the 1790s, and the Metastasian model continued to dominate.

=== 1770–1800 ===
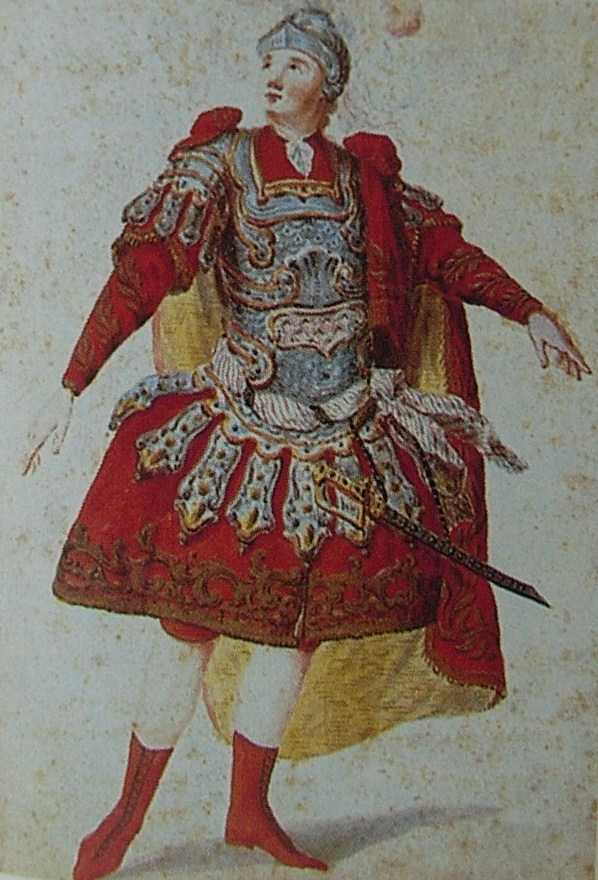
Anton Raaff, the German tenor who created the title role in Mozart's Idomeneo, seen here performing a heroic role, c. 1780

Gluck's reforms made most of the composers of opera seria of the previous decades obsolete. The careers of Hasse, Galuppi, Jommelli, and Traetta were effectively finished. Replacing them came a new wave of composers such as Wolfgang Amadeus Mozart, Joseph Haydn, Johann Christian Bach, Carl Heinrich Graun, Florian Leopold Gassmann, Pasquale Anfossi, Pietro Alessandro Guglielmi, Antonio Salieri (a disciple of Gluck), Giuseppe Bonno, Antonio Sacchini, Giuseppe Sarti, Niccolò Piccinni, Giovanni Paisiello and Domenico Cimarosa. The popularity of the aria da capo began to fade, replaced by the rondò. Orchestras grew in size, arias lengthened, ensembles became more prominent, and obbligato recitative became both common and more elaborate. While throughout the 1780s Metastasio's libretti still dominated the repertory, a new group of Venetian librettists pushed opera seria in a new direction. The work of Gaetano Sertor and the group surrounding him finally broke the absolute dominance of the singers and gave opera seria a new impetus towards the spectacular and the dramatic elements of 19th-century Romantic opera. Tragic endings, on-stage death and regicide became the norm rather than the exception. By the final decade of the century opera seria as it had been traditionally defined was essentially dead, and the political upheavals that the French Revolution inspired swept it away once and for all.

== Social context ==
With a few exceptions, opera seria was the opera of the court, of the monarchy and the nobility. This is not a universal picture: Handel in London composed not for the court but for a much more socially diverse audience, and in the Venetian republic composers modified their operas to suit the public taste and not that of the court. But for the most part, opera seria was synonymous with court opera. This brought with it a number of conditions: the court, and particularly the monarch, required that their own nobility be reflected on the stage. Opera seria plot-lines are heavily shaped by this criterion: Il re pastore displays the glory of Alexander the Great, while La clemenza di Tito does the same for the Roman emperor Titus. The potentate in the audience would watch his counterparts from the ancient world and see their benevolent autocracy redound to his own credit.

Many aspects of the staging contributed to this effect: both the auditorium and stage were lit during performances, while the sets mirrored almost exactly the architecture of the palace hosting the opera. Sometimes the links between opera and audience were even closer: Gluck's serenata Il Parnaso confuso was first performed at Vienna with a cast consisting of members of the royal family. However, with the French Revolution came serious political upheavals across Italy, and as new, more egalitarian republics were established and old autocracies fell away, the Arcadian ideals of opera seria seemed increasingly irrelevant. Rulers were no longer free from violent deaths, and under new social ideals the hierarchy of singers broke down. Such significant socio-political change meant that opera seria, so closely allied to the ruling class, was finished.
