= César Pérez =

César Pérez may refer to:

- César Pérez (athlete) (born 1975), Spanish steeplechase runner
- César Pérez (footballer) (born 2002), Chilean football midfielder
- César Pérez Sentenat (1896–1973), Cuban pianist and composer
- César Pérez Vivas (born 1957), Venezuelan lawyer and politician, Governor of Táchira
- Cesar Perez Batista (born 1980), Panamanian physician and Medical Oncologist, Drug Developer
