= César Pérez Sentenat =

Cuban pianist and composer (1896-1973)

César Pérez Sentenat (1896-1973) was a Cuban pianist and composer. He has been recognized as an important professor of classical piano in Cuba.

== Professional background ==
César Pérez Sentenat began to study piano in 1913 with Hubert de Blanck, Rafaela Serrano and Antonio Saavedra, and music theory with José Molina. In 1922 he travelled to Paris, where he studied with Joaquín Nin Castellanos. He also studied musical pedagogy and musicology at the Schola Cantorum. Upon his return to Havana he studied contemporary harmony with Pedro Sanjuán and Amadeo Roldán, between 1924 and 1926. At a later time he travelled to the US, where he continued studying Children Musical Pedagogy with John M. Williams from 1939 to 1940. In 1953 he travelled to Madrid to take courses on Musical Folklore at the Madrid Conservatory, with professor Manuel García.

== Professor ==
In 1922, Pérez Sentenat was appointed as professor of piano and harmony at the National Conservatory, and in 1940 he served as associate professor at the Sherwood Music School in Chicago.

Sentenat served as professor at the Conservatorio Municipal de Música, and in 1931 he was appointed as director of that educational institution. Also in 1931, he founded the Escuela Normal de Música along with composer Amadeo Roldán, where he expanded the courses and organized a night school. He also participated in the foundation of the Conservatorio Internacional de Música, directed by María Jones de Castro, in collaboration with Caridad Benítez, where they implemented the first musical preschool and college in Cuba.

In 1945 he was designated as provincial inspector of music in Havana, and in 1948 as general inspector. In 1961 he was appointed as professor of piano and director of the Guillermo M. Tomás Conservatory in Guanabacoa, and in 1965 he served as general music director of the National Culture Council and president of the Musical Education Reform Commission. His students included renowned musicians such as Solomon Mikowsky, Magaly Ruiz, Juan Piñera and Horacio Gutiérrez.

== Pianist ==
In 1933, Pérez Sentenat performed Spanish composer Manuel de Falla’s Noche en los Jardines de España (Night in the Spanish gardens) and Concert for Clavicembalo and Orchestra with the Habana Philharmonic Orchestra, conducted by Amadeo Roldán. César Pérez Sentenat offered his last piano concert at the Palacio de Bellas Artes of Havana, in 1972. He died on May 4, 1973.

== Composer ==
Cesar Pérez Sentenat also dedicated himself to musical composition, though his activity in this field was overshadowed by his pedagogical work. As a composer he didn’t produce a large catalogue of works and mainly focused on a didactical approach and a structural simplicity. In regard to style, he adhered to nationalism with an accent on rural elements.

== Other activities ==
In 1922, Sentenat participated, along with Gonzalo Roig and Ernesto Lecuona, in the founding of the Symphony Orchestra of Havana, with which he collaborated as a pianist and secretary general. In 1942, he joined Amadeo Roldán to create the Philharmonic Orchestra of Havana.

== Musical compositions ==
Pieces for piano:

- El jardín de Ismaelillo (Didactical pieces), 1931
- La pequeña Rebambaramba, 1932
- Transcription for piano of Danza de los congos from Amadeo Roldán, 1945
- Transcription for four hands of the Six two part inventions of Juan Sebastián Bach, 1950.
- Dos estampas españolas, 1954
- Carnaval humorístico, 1955
- Suite cubana en sol menor, 1956
- Preludio en todos los tonos, 1957
- Cuatro estampas para un pionero, 1962

Pieces for voice and piano:

- Martianas, 1931
- Tres canciones campesinas, 1931-1957
- La tierra colorá... de siembra, pregón, 1947
- Tríptico de villancicos cubanos, 1949
- Aguinaldo del negro cristiano, 1952
- Cuatro estampas para un pinero, for singer and piano
