= Jorge Luis Prats =

Cuban pianist (born 1956)

Jorge Luis Prats Soca (born 3 July 1956) is a Cuban pianist living in Spain.

Prats Soca was born in Camagüey. He studied piano since 1963 under Barbara Díaz Alea. In 1970, he was accepted into National Art School, from which he graduated in 1976. He studied under Frank Fernández and Margot Rojas. In 1977, Prats won first prize at the Long-Thibaud-Crespin Competition in France. Later he studied with Rudolf Kehrer in Moscow, Magda Tagliaferro in Paris, Paul Badura-Skoda in Vienna and Witold Małcużyński in Warsaw. He was awarded a number of decorations in Cuba, including the Félix Varela medal (the highest award in Cuba in culture) in 1984 and the Premio Nacional de Música in 2004. He was the artistic director of the National Symphony Orchestra of Cuba until 2004.

In 2004, Prats left Cuba to have an opportunity to travel. He settled in Spain and in 2005 became a naturalized Spanish citizen.
