= Louis Franz Aguirre =

Cuban composer and conductor

- Born: 1968 (age 56–57)
- Origin: Camagüey, Cuba
- Occupation(s): Composer, conductor, professor
- Website: louisaguirre.wix.com/louis-aguirre#!__site

Louis Franz Aguirre (born in Camagüey, Cuba, 1968) is a Cuban composer and conductor that has achieved international recognition.

== Academic background ==
Louis Aguirre studied musical composition with Harold Gramatges, Roberto Valera and Tulio Peramo, as well as violin and conducting at the Havana Instituto Superior de Arte. He received a BA in musical composition in 1991. He also underwent postgraduate composition studies at the Conservatorium van Amsterdam in The Netherlands from 2002 to 2004, studying the composition postgraduate program: "Contemporary music through non-Western Techniques" with professor R. Reina, and at the Århus Royal Conservatory in Denmark from 2004 to 2005 with Karl Aage Rasmussen, Rolf Wallin and Hans Abrahamsen.

== Work as composer ==
Louis Aguirre works as a full-time composer since he moved to Europe in 2002, where he has received numerous commissions. Aguirre has written works for numerous prestigious performers and ensembles such as Ere Lievonen, Enric Monfort, Adam Ørvad, Carlos Gálvez, Juanjo Guillem, Mikkel Andersen, Barbara Lueneburg, Karolina Leedo, Axyz Ensemble, Arbós Trío, Snow Mask Ensemble, Kimbala Percussion Group, DuoMetrie, Verso Duo, Havana Symphony Orchestra, Santiago Symphony Orchestra, Camagüey Symphony Orchestra, the Arditti Quartet, TANA String Quartet, Residencias Ensemble, Neopercusión and Colectivo Neo.

His music has been performed at numerous festivals and venues in Europe, China, the USA and South and Latin America, such as the Internationale Ferienkurse für Neue Musik in Darmstadt, Germany, SUSÅ Contemporary Music Festival, Denmark, Granada Festival Internacional de Música y Danza, Spain, Liubliana Festival, Slovenia, Summartónar, Faroe Islands and Amsterdam Gaudeamus Week, Netherlands.

Aguirre’s music has been broadcast by Spanish, German, Danish, Cuban and Dutch radio and TV stations. His ample catalog includes opera, orchestral and chamber music, solo pieces, as well as choral, and vocal music.

== Work as conductor ==
From 1995 to 2000, Louis Aguirre served as principal conductor and artistic director of the Camagüey Symphony Orchestra in Cuba. He worked also as guest conductor of the National Symphony Orchestra of Havana and the Symphony Orchestra of Santiago de Cuba.

== Work as professor ==
Also from 1995 to 2000, Aguirre was designated as professor of the Camagüey Music Conservatory and Founder, chairman and artistic director of the International Festival of Contemporary Music in the same city.

== Books and essays on Louis Aguirre and his music ==
- Hernández Isabelle. 2001. Aguirre, enfant terrible. The Granma newspaper, Saturday, October 20, 2001.
- Morales Flores, Iván César. 2005. Ebbó: Estudio analítico de una ópera de Louis Aguirre. Thesis, Havana Superior Institute of Arts.
- Morales Flores, Iván Cesar. 2008. Ebbó: del rito al simulacro, in Boletín de Música #21/ Enero- Marzo/ Revista de Música Latinoamericana y Caribeña, Casa de las Américas.
- Molerio Rosa, Arleti María. 2009. La producción musical del compositor Louis Aguirre Rovira en el presente de la música de cámara académica cubana. Revista Variaciones #1, Universidad Estatal de Cuenca, Ecuador.
- Albertson Dan. April 2010. La Folia, Online Music Review. "Qualche tedeschi, qualche gaijin". (review on CD Verso, "IBEYI".)
- Santacecilia María. July 2010. Mundo Clásico: Nadar en ríos metafísicos. Spain.
- Morales Flores, Iván Cesar. November 2011. Louis Aguirre, una inusual confluencia sonora de ritos y culturas, in Musiker.18, 2011. Spain.
- Santana, Ernesto. March 31, 2014. CUBANET: Hasta donde me lleven los dioses.
- Durán-Loriga, Jacobo. December 26, 2014. Sulponticello: Arrebato festivo: 20 años de Neopercusión.
- O’Bannon, Ricky. December, 2014. Baltimore Symphony Orchestra: 5 Cuban Composers to watch.

== See also ==
- Music of Cuba
