= Roberto Urbay =

Cuban concert pianist and professor (born 1953)

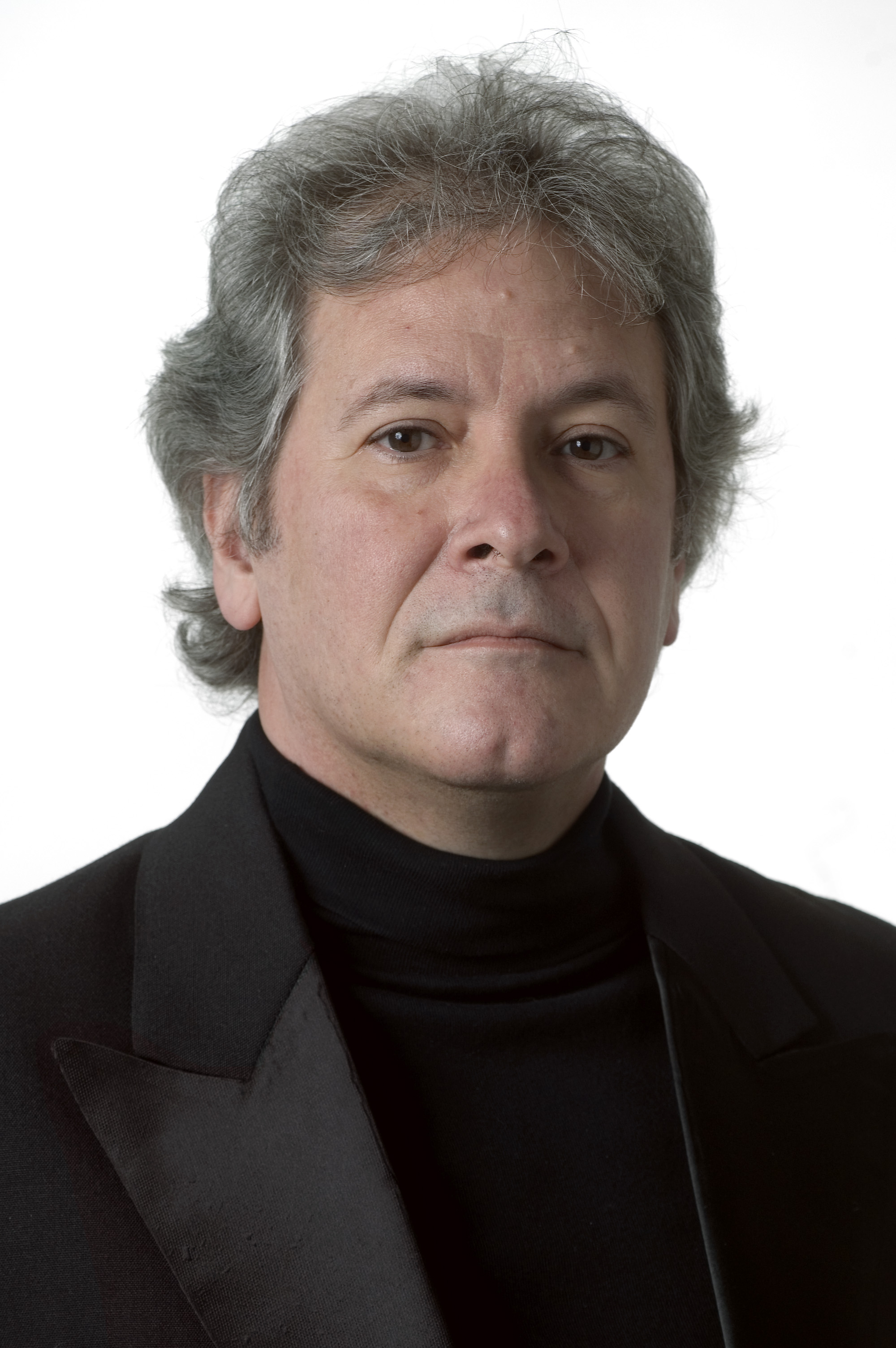

Background information
- Born: 8 August 1953; Havana, Cuba
- Genres: Classical music
- Occupations: Classical pianist
- Years active: 1973–present
- Labels: EGREM, Colibrí, Magic Music

Roberto Urbay (born August 8, 1953 in Havana) is a Cuban concert pianist and piano professor.

== Biography ==
Roberto Urbay studied at Escuela Nacional de Arte in Havana, Cuba where he was instructed by Margot Rojas Mendoza and Silvio Rodríguez Cárdenas. He was awarded a scholarship to study at the Tchaikovsky Conservatory in Moscow. There, he studied with Evgeny Mogilevsky and got the diploma of Master of Fine Arts with a specialization as Concert Pianist and Piano Professor in 1983. He was also awarded grants to make postgraduate courses in Hungary on Liszt and Bartók's work in 1986 and 1987 under the guidance of such illustrious pianists as Georges Cziffra and Zoltan Kocsis.

Roberto Urbay was awarded the UNEAC Prize - Unión Nacional de Escritores y Artistas de Cuba - in 1973, as well as the Special Prize in Chamber Music at the Grandstand for Young Interpreters at the Interpodium Festival in Bratislava (1977). He also participated in three famous International Competitions: Queen Elizabeth, in Brussels (1978), Van Cliburn, in Texas (1981) and Liszt, in Budapest (1986).

His interpreting art has been appreciated in Belgium, Russia, the Czech Republic, Slovakia, Italy, Spain, Albania, Germany, Hungary, Kazajstan, Korea, Japan, the USA, Colombia, Dominican Republic, Chile, Bolivia, Argentina, and Cuba, where he has interpreted an extensive and well varied repertory in solo concerts, chamber music and concerts with orchestra, in festivals, competitions and international tours.

With over 40 years of teaching the art of the piano, he has been professor at prestigious musical institutions, such as the Instituto Superior de Arte in Havana and at the Music Department that belongs to the Universidad Nacional de Cuyo, in Mendoza, Argentina, where he is a full professor since 1995. His students have won more than 50 prizes in diverse piano competitions in many countries. He has been President and Member of the Jury in contests and competitions. Besides he has given improvement courses on Mozart and Liszt's work, Latin-American Music, The Piano in the Romantic Period. He has also lectured Master Classes, Seminars and Conferences.

He has recorded for the discographic labels of Magic Music, Egrem and Colibrí. Many of his recordings, in CD as well as in DVD, have been prize-winning in the Feria Discográfica Internacional, "Cubadisco", such as: Harold Gramatges' Complete works for Piano (1999); Heitor Villa-Lobos' Five Piano Concertos (2007), in which Urbay interpreted the Concierto Nº 5; and Mozart in Havana, with 4 sonatas for Piano (2008), recordings that have awarded a prize under the categories of Great Prize and Solo Player.

== Discography ==
- 1997: Harold Gramatges: Obra Completa para Piano (The Complete Piano Works) (EGREM 2CD)
- 1997: Homenaje a Harold Gramatges (Homage to Harold Gramatges) (Magic Music)
- 2002: Antología Pianística Cubana Vol. I (Cuban Piano Anthology Vol. I) (EGREM)
- 2002: Antología Pianística Cubana Vol. II (Cuban Piano Anthology Vol. II) (EGREM)
- 2004: Harold Gramatges: Mis Versiones Preferidas (My favorite Versions) (EGREM)
- 2004: Harold Gramatges: Obra Completa para Piano Vol. I (The Complete Piano Works Vol. I) (EGREM)
- 2004: Harold Gramatges: Obra Completa para Piano Vol. II (The Complete Piano Works Vol. II) (EGREM)
- 2006: Heitor Villa-Lobos: Cinco Conciertos para Piano y Orquesta (Five Piano Concertos) (Colibrí 2CD)

== Videography ==
- 2006: Heitor Villa-Lobos: Cinco Conciertos para Piano y Orquesta (Five Piano Concertos) (Colibrí DVD)
- 2007: Harold Gramatges: La Magia de la Música (Factoría Author DVD)
- 2007: Mozart en La Habana (Colibrí 3DVD)
