= Evelio Tieles =

Cuban violinist (born 1941)

Evelio Tieles Ferrer (born August 8, 1941) is a Cuban violinist and professor that has organized and promoted the instruction of bowed strings instruments in Cuba.

== Academic background ==
Evelio Tieles was born and raised in Havana, Cuba. He began to study music in Cuba with his father, Evelio Tieles Soler, when he was seven years old, and continued at a later time with professor Joaquín Molina.

Between 1952 and 1954, Tieles studied violin in Paris, France, with Jacques Thibaud and René Benedetti. In 1955, he returned to Paris and studied at the National Superior Music Conservatory in that city. In 1958, he continued his musical training at Conservatorio Tchaikovsky in Moscow, where he was a disciple of violinists David Oistrakh and Igor Oistrakh. Tieles graduated in 1963 and by recommendation of the Conservatory he pursued his master's degree from 1963 to 1966, with the same mentioned professors.

Tieles also received professional training from the prestigious violinists Henryk Szeryng and Eduardo Hernández Asiaín. He also received a degree in the History of Art in 1981, and obtained his master's degree in 2010 from the Superior Institute of Art (ISA), today named the University of the Arts, in Havana, Cuba.

== Performer ==
Evelio Tieles has offered numerous presentations as a concert performer, in a duo with his brother, pianist Cecilio Tieles, or accompanied by the Cuban National Symphony Orchestra and other symphonic and chamber ensembles. He participated frequently as a soloist in the “Jornadas de Música Contemporánea de los países socialistas” presented by the National Union of Writers and Artists of Cuba (UNEAC), and performed along with prestigious conductors such as Thomas Sanderling, Boris Brott, Enrique González Mántici, and Manuel Duchesne Cuzán, entre otros.

In 1969, Tieles performed in México, invited by violinist Henryk Szeryng, and has conducted concert tours through numerous countries in North America, Latin America, Europe and the Middle East.

== Professor ==
Evelio Tieles worked in the National School of Arts and the Instituto Superior de Arte (ISA) in Havana, Cuba, where he served as Professor and Head of Chair of Bowed String Instruments since the inception of both academic institutions. He also served as National Advisor of Bowed String Instruments from 1967 to 1981, and between the years 1997 and 2004. Tieles is currently Professor and Consultant Professor at the University of the Arts (formerly Instituto Superior de Arte [ISA]).

Tieles has established his residence in Spain since 1984, and he teaches violin in the Vila-seca Conservatory, in Tarragona, Spain, where he has been appointed as “Professor Emeritus”. He has also served at the Superior Conservatory of the Barcelona Lyceum as Professor and Head of the Division of Bowed String Instruments, Chief of the Chamber Music Department and Academic Director, between the years 1986 and 2007.

== Other activities ==
Apart from his career as a concert performer and professor, Evelio Tieles has dedicated time and effort to the promotion of activities that benefit cultural education and development, not just in his native Cuba, but also in Spain. During the Post-Revolutionary period (after 1960), he promoted and organized in Cuba the bowed string instruments training, and fundamentally for the violin.

Evelio Tieles founded along with the Cuban double-bassist Orestes Urfé the National School of Arts Chamber Orchestra, in 1981. He has also founded the Vila-seca Chamber Orchestra (Tarragona, Spain), from which he was Artistic Director for 27 years, in 1986; the Havana Chamber Ensemble in 1988 and the Camagüey Chamber Orchestra in 1994. As a consequence of his pedagogic activity during the 1990s, two chamber orchestras were created: the Manuel Saumell Orchestra and the Havana Chamber Orchestra.

Tieles was President of the Music Section of the National Union of Writers and Artists of Cuba (UNEAC), from 1977 to 1984, and worked for many years as coordinator of the Cuban Music Journeys and the Contemporary Music Festival of the Socialist Countries in Havana, Cuba. He also created the Contemporary Music Festival of Havana, and founded along with his brother Cecilo, the Tieles Duo, to which many composers, such as Ramón Barce, Xavier Benguerel, Harold Gramatges, José Ardévol, Nilo Rodríguez, Salvador Pueyo and Gottfried Glöckner, among others, have dedicated original compositions. Other important Cuban composers have dedicated pieces to Evelio Tieles, such as the Cuban composers Alfredo Diez Nieto and Roberto Valera and the Spanish composer Ramón Barce.

In 2022, Tieles published a book Sentir-Pensar: El violin y yo (Feel-Think: The violin and me) in which he discusses his life, his pedagogical experience with the violin, and his musical research.

== Awards and recognitions ==
In 1962, Tieles received a Diploma at the International Henryk Wieniawski Violin Competition in Poland; in 1964 he received and Honorific Mention at the Paganini Contest, in Italy; and in 1966 and Honor Diploma at the Tchaikovsky Contest in Moscow. He has also received national recognitions such as the Distinctions for the National Culture and the Artistic education, the Diploma to the Artistic Merit from the Superior Institute of Art, in 2002, the 50th Anniversary of FAR Medal in 2007 and the Distinction for the National Culture Medal in 2011.

== Discography ==
- Encontre de Compositors V - Illa De Mallorca (UM, 1990). Evelio Tieles, violin; Cecilio Tieles, piano; Javier Maderuelo, Voice, Electronics; Carles Santos, piano; Jesús Rodríguez Picó, clarient;
- Simfonia Barroca (AYVA Musica, 2012). Orquestra de Cambre de Vila-Seca; Evelio Tieles, Director
