= Dulce María Serret =

Cuban pianist and music teacher (1898–1989)

Dulce María Serret Danger
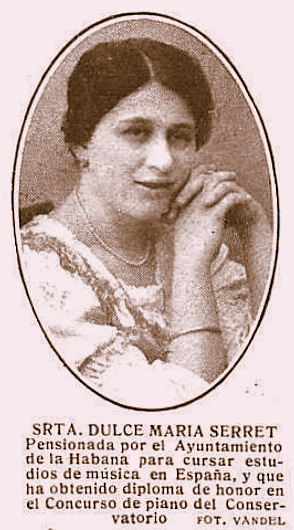
- Dulce María Serret, Madrid, 1917
- Born: 12 September 1898; Santiago de Cuba, Captaincy General of Cuba, Spanish Empire
- Died: 30 May 1989 (aged 90); Havana, Cuba
- Occupation(s): Pianist and teacher

Dulce María Serret Danger (1898 – 30 May 1989) was a Cuban pianist and music teacher. She studied in Spain and France, and toured in Europe for several years before returning to Cuba, where she taught for most of the rest of her life.

== Early years ==
Dulce María Serret was born in Santiago de Cuba on 12 September 1898. She showed musical aptitude from an early age, and began music lessons when she was 9 years old. In her home town she was taught by Gustavo Rogel and Ramón Figueroa. She was given a recommendation by the professor José Marín Varona of Camagüey to the National Conservatory of Music of Havana, an institution that had been founded by the Dutch composer and pianist Hubert de Blanck. In 1913 the public recitals of Ernesto Lecuona and Dulce María Serret made a great impression on Margot Rojas Mendoza, who was then a child.

== Europe ==
In 1915 Dulce María Serret was award a scholarship by the Havana city council to study in Spain at the Madrid Royal Conservatory. She studied under José Tragó and won the prize of honour at the Conservatory. She graduated in 1917 and performed before the royal family. She performed throughout Spain and Portugal in large venues in major cities. At the age of 22 she moved to France in 1920 and attended the Schola Cantorum de Paris, where she studied romanticism and ancient and modern music. In Paris she was taught by Édouard Risler.

== Teacher ==
In May 1926 Dulce María Serret returned to Cuba and made her debut at the Teatro Nacional de Cuba. On 15 July 1926 she performed with her brother Antonio in the Teatro Oriente in Santiago de Cuba. Antonio Serret founded the first symphony orchestra in Santiago de Cuba. They were both friends of the Cuban composer Alejandro García Caturla. Dulce María settled in Santiago de Cuba in 1927.

Dulce María created a stir in her home town that led to creation of the Conservatory there, with Dulce María Serret as director. The Conservatory staged concerts, recitals and lectures. At the Provincial Conservatory she taught many well-known musicians. The composer Harold Gramatges was her pupil in 1928 at the Conservatorio Provincial of Oriente. He was one of her favorite students. Silvio Rogríguez Cardenas was also one of her pupils. The choral director Ana Ariaza was another. She spent most of her life teaching music.

Dulce María Serret died in Havana on 30 May 1989.

== Sources ==
- "Dulce María Serret Danger", Cubanos Famosos (in Spanish), 2013
- Ficher, Miguel; Furman Schleifer, Martha; Furman, John M. (2002-10-16), Latin American Classical Composers: A Biographical Dictionary, Scarecrow Press, ISBN 978-1-4616-6911-1
- Jinao Sánchez, Santiago (22 May 1919), "Dulce Maria Serret", La Ilustración Española y Americana (in Spanish), Madrid
- "Muere la pianista y pedagoga, Margot Rojas Mendoza", Habana Radio – Oficina del Historiador de Ciudad de La Habana (in Spanish), 29 March 2013
- Orovio, Helio (2004-02-20), Cuban Music from A to Z, Duke University Press, ISBN 0-8223-8521-X
- White, Charles W. (2003), Alejandro García Caturla: A Cuban Composer in the Twentieth Century, Scarecrow Press, ISBN 978-0-8108-4381-3
