= Margot Rojas Mendoza =

Mexican-Cuban pianist and teacher (1903–1996)

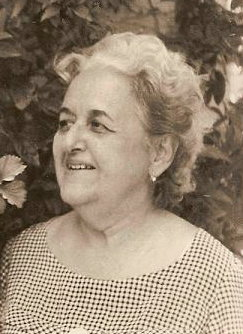
- Margot Rojas
- Born: 24 March 1903; Veracruz, Mexico
- Died: 1 November 1996 (aged 93); Havana, Cuba
- Occupations: Pianist and teacher

Margot Rojas Mendoza (24 March 1903 – 1 November 1996) was a Cuban pianist and teacher of Cuban-Mexican origin. She performed as a concert pianist in New York, Mexico and Cuba for several years before turning to teaching. Several of her pupils became distinguished musicians.

== Early years ==
Margot Rojas was born in Veracruz, Mexico on 24 March 1903. Her mother was Cuban and her father Mexican. She started her musical studies at the age of five under her aunt, Consuelo Mendoza. In 1912 she moved with her family to Havana, where she continued her studies at the Hubert de Blanck Conservatory. She was taught theory by José Molina Torres and Rafaela Serrano, and was taught piano by Consuelo Quesada and Hubert de Blanck. In Cuba in 1913 the public performances of Ernesto Lecuona and Dulce María Serret made a great impression on her. She graduated from Hubert de Blanck's piano classes in 1916.

== Performer ==
In 1919 Margot went to New York City and studied under Alexander Lambert, who had himself studied under Franz Liszt in Weimar. She accompanied the violinist Joseph Joachim, and performed at the Steinway Hall. On her way back to Cuba she performed in Mexico City at the Sala Wagner and the Palacio de Bellas Artes. At the start of the 1920s Margot launched in a career as a concert player in Cuba, giving recitals in Santiago de Cuba and Camagüey. Margot Rojas first performed in public in Cuba in 1920 with a recital in the Sala Espadero of the Hubert de Blanck Conservatory. She played on 20 October 1923 at the Teatro Nacional de Cuba. On 30 November 1924 she performed Frédéric Chopin's Piano Concerto No. 1 as first soloist with the Havana Philharmonic Orchestra conducted by Pedro Sanjuán Nortes.

Margot made a second trip to New York to receive master classes from leading pianists. After her return, on 16 March 1930 she performed Sergei Rachmaninoff's Piano Concerto No. 2 with the Havana Symphony Orchestra directed by Gonzalo Roig. She was 27 years old. She was persecuted for her progressive opinions, and had to return to Mexico under the "machadato" regime of Gerardo Machado. From 1933 to 1937 (Note: The dates 1933–37 for her stay in Mexico are inconsistent with her absence being due to the Machado regime, which was overthrown in 1933.) she lived in Mexico and performed in the Sala del Conservatorio Nacional in the Palacio de Bellas Artes. She performed in recitals for two pianos with Ernesto Lecuona and Margot de Blanck.

== Teacher ==
After Machado was overthrown Margot returned to Cuba and started to teach as a member of the faculty of the "International Conservatory" that had recently been founded by María Jones de Castro. Soon after she also worked for Hubert de Blanck and in the Colegio Phillips, where she conducted a choir. Teaching provided a stable source of income compared to concert appearances, for which there was limited demand. She made her last public performance in 1957. After the Cuban Revolution of 1959 she was appointed to the Piano Chair at the Amadeo Roldán Conservatory and was asked to teach in the recently created Escuela Nacional de Arte (National School of Art). Margot Rojas died in Havana on 1 November 1996 at the age of 93.

== Pupils ==
Pupils of Margot Rojas include:

- Frank Fernández
- Carlos Malcolm
- Juan Piñera
- Jorge Luis Prats
- Roberto Urbay
- José María Vitier

== Sources ==
- Carpentier, Alejo (1987), Ese músico que llevo dentro (in Spanish), Siglo XXI, ISBN 968-23-1394-5
- Ficher, Miguel; Schleifer, Martha Furman; Furman, John M. (2002-10-16), Latin American Classical Composers: A Biographical Dictionary, Scarecrow Press, ISBN 978-1-4616-6911-1
- "Muere la pianista y pedagoga, Margot Rojas Mendoza", Habana Radio – Oficina del Historiador de Ciudad de La Habana (in Spanish), 29 March 2013
- Orovio, Helio (2004-02-20), Cuban Music from A to Z, Duke University Press, ISBN 0-8223-8521-X
