= Manuel Saumell =

Cuban composer

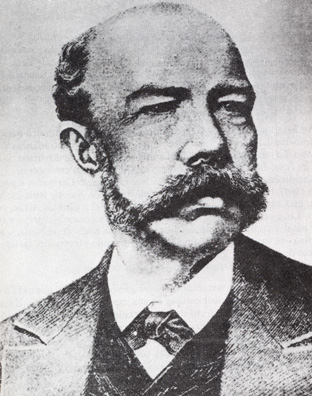
Manuel Saumell Robredo

Manuel Saumell Robredo (19 April 1818 – 14 August 1870), was a Cuban composer known for his invention and development of genuinely creolized forms of music. For this reason he gets the credit for being the first to cultivate Cuban musical nationalism, and is of similar standing to Glinka who initiated Russian musical nationalism with A Life for the Tsar at about the same time.

== Life ==
Saumell, from a destitute family, "destined to die young, after leading a miserable, peripatetic, sorrowful existence" was born in Havana. He studied piano with Juan Federico Edelmann, and harmony, arranging, counterpoint and fugue with Maurice Pyke, the director of an Italian opera company which visited Havana. Saumell played the organ in church and interpreted Beethoven for trios, organized musical meetings, made orchestrations and arrangements, and taught classes. "Saumell was a truly hard worker, sensitive, generous with others, demanding of himself; he was eager to achieve great things [and] inspired to great projects."

At 21 he fell heavily in love with a singer, Dolores de Saint-Maxent, who had introduced Schubert's work to Cuba. Unfortunately for him, she came from a wealthy family who would not countenance their marriage. All the same, for a time she permitted his attentions to continue. Saumell planned a nationalistic opera to show off her talent, based on the novel Antonelli by José Antonio Echevarría. The action takes place in Havana in 1590. A workforce of black slaves sets up the machinery of one of El Cerro's first sugar mills. The engineer Antonelli falls in love with a beautiful Siboney quadroon, only to find she is betrothed to the nephew of the Governor of Havana. And so it proceeds...

Alas, before the libretto could be written (in Italian), Delores broke off their relationship, and pursued another man. Shattered, Saumell dropped the project and went back to his scattered life, writing contradanzas and surviving on what little he could make. However, he had done a significant thing: he had planned for aboriginal Indians and black slaves to sing and take part in the action of the opera, something without precedent in all the Americas.

== Works ==
Leaving aside numbers written in haste for dances, Saumell wrote over fifty contradanzas (in 2/4 or 6/8 time) which merit attention. His rhythmic and melodic inventiveness is astonishing. No two pages are alike, according to Carpentier, he never repeats himself. Contradanzas were composed in two parts, a prima of eight bars followed by the segunda of sixteen bars, or else 16 followed by 16. Saumell used to write a prima in classical style, followed by a segunda in creolized Cuban folkloric style.

"Saumell is absolutely prophetic in fixing certain rhythms which would be mined in the future under different names... Saumell is the father not only of the contradanza... but also the habanera (the prima of La Amistad), danzón (La Tedezco), the guajira (segunda of La Matilde), the criolla (the segunda of La Nené), the clavé (La Celestina)... Everything done after him would amplify or distinguish elements plainly exposed in his works."

"After Saumell's visionary work, all that was left to do was to develop his innovations, all of which profoundly influenced the history of Cuban nationalist musical movements." Helio Orovio

"The most important [Cuban] musician of the [19th] century was Manuel Saumell Robredo"

The scores of Saumell's Contradanzas for piano are available at Cuatro 40 Ediciones in printed form or downloadable PDF.
