= Horacio Gutiérrez =

Cuban-American classical pianist (born 1948)

Horacio Gutiérrez (born 1948) is a Cuban-American classical pianist known for his performances of works in the Romantic Repertoire.

== Early life and education ==
When Fidel Castro gained control of Cuba in 1959, the family decided to leave the country.

He moved with his family to the United States in 1962, studying in Los Angeles with Sergei Tarnowsky, Vladimir Horowitz's first teacher in Kiev, and later at the Juilliard School under Adele Marcus, a pupil of Russian pianist Josef Lhévinne. He later worked extensively with American pianist William Masselos, a pupil of Carl Friedberg, who himself had studied with Clara Schumann and Johannes Brahms.

In 1970, he was a student at the Juilliard School of Music in New York.

== Career ==
Gutiérrez's performance career spans over four decades. He was first seen on American television in 1966, on one of the Young People's Concerts with Leonard Bernstein, playing "The Great Gate of Kiev" from Pictures at an Exhibition, by Modest Mussorgsky.

On August 23, 1970, Gutiérrez made his debut with the Los Angeles Philharmonic under Zubin Mehta in Rachmaninoff's 3rd Piano Concerto. Martin Bernheimer, music critic with the Los Angeles Times, described his first appearance with the orchestra as "spectacular".

He was M.D. Anderson Distinguished Professor of Music at the University of Houston from 1996 to 2003. He is currently teaching at Manhattan School of Music.

Gutiérrez is best known for his interpretation of the Romantic repertoire. He has been commented for performances of the Classical style in music of composers such as Haydn, Mozart, Beethoven, and Brahms.

Gutiérrez is a strong champion of contemporary American composers. He has performed works by William Schuman, André Previn and George Perle. His recording "George Perle: A Retrospective" was named one of the ten best recordings of 2006 by The New Yorker. Perle dedicated Nine Bagatelles to Gutiérrez.

== Recordings ==
He has recorded for EMI, Telarc and Chandos Records.

Gutiérrez's recordings include:

- Prokofiev's Concertos No. 2 and 3 with Neeme Järvi and the Royal Concertgebouw Orchestra. The recording has been acclaimed since its initial release in 1990. Reissued as part of Prokofiev The Piano Concertos in 2009, it was Gramophone's Editor's Choice in September (2009). Bryce Morrison wrote in Gramophone Magazine, "...Gutiérrez unleashes some of the most thrilling virtuosity on record, storming the Second Concerto's first movement development/cadenza in a manner that will make lesser pianists tremble."
- Brahms Piano Concerto No. 1 with André Previn and Royal Philharmonic Orchestra
- Brahms Piano Concerto No.2 with André Previn and Royal Philharmonic Orchestra
- Tchaikovsky Piano Concerto No. 1 and Rachmaninoff's Rhapsody on a Theme by Paganini with David Zinman and the Baltimore Symphony.
- Tchaikovsky Piano Concerto No. 1 and Liszt Piano Concerto No. 1 with Andre Previn and the London Symphony Orchestra.

== Television ==
- BBC "Previn Music Nights" with the London Symphony, (1975)
- PBS Series: "Previn and the Pittsburgh," (1976)
- PBS Series: "Previn and the Pittsburgh," (1982)
- PBS Series: Live from Lincoln Center, "Mostly Mozart Festival," (1985)
- PBS Series: Live from Lincoln Center, "Chamber Music Society with Irene Worth and Horacio Gutierrez," (1986)
- The Tonight Show Starring Johnny Carson, (1985), (1986) (Three appearances)

== Awards ==
He won the silver medal and was the top American prize-winner at 21 years of age in the 1970 International Tchaikovsky Competition in Moscow, Soviet Union. and was soon presented in major world-wide concert venues by Sol Hurok's management.

In 1982, he was awarded the Avery Fisher Prize in recognition of his musical achievements.

He won an Emmy Award for his fourth appearance with the Chamber Music Society of Lincoln Center.

== Reception ==
After his debut recital in London, Joan Chissell, music critic with The Times (London) wrote, His virtuosity is of the kind of which legends are made.

== Personal life ==
He currently lives and works in the United States. He met his wife, pianist Patricia Asher, while she was studying with William Masselos and Adele Marcus at the Juilliard School. Gutiérrez suffers from bursitis and a chronic back injury.
