= Nicolás Ruiz Espadero =

Cuban pianist (1832–1890)

Nicolás Ruiz Espadero (February 15, 1832 – August 30, 1890) was a Cuban pianist, composer, piano teacher and editor of the posthumous works of American composer-pianist Louis Moreau Gottschalk.

Espadero was born and died in Havana. In his time, he was the most famous Cuban composer, the only one published abroad, the only one who, at least in the eyes of his Cuban contemporaries, could compete with composers from Europe.

Yet of all the Cuban composers of the 19th and early 20th century he was the most parochial and idiosyncratic one. Without schooling and formal musical training, he grew into a chronically shy person, emotionally dependent on his mother. He composed and continually practised, but gave few concerts and had little contact with other people. Espadero never left Cuba, indeed he seldom ever left his own house, where he lived with seventeen cats, surrounded by stacks of European music scores. Universally described as a recluse, he died from accidental burns after his usual bath in alcohol.

Although brought up in a cosmopolitan atmosphere and surrounded by black Cuban music, he was the one Cuban composer who adopted but little of the local music tradition that inspired Manuel Saumell before and Ignacio Cervantes after him. He had numerous pupils, and some of them became prominent musicians themselves. Nothing of Espadero's music has remained in the repertoire, yet his later pieces – allegedly his best output, albeit never printed – remain to be investigated. A CD with a selection of his piano music came out in 2006.

== Biography ==
=== Culture and society ===
Cuba was then still a Spanish colony and in all matters of administration, economy and interior and exterior policy dependent on Madrid. The island was a colonial backwater, infested by malaria and yellow fever. Cuba's society was sharply divided into a privileged class of landowners and Spanish colonial administrators – and black and mulatto slaves. Virtually no middle class existed. Of more than two millions blacks, less than 35,000 were free.

=== Descent and parents ===
Espadero was born in Havana. His mother was a pianist from Cádiz, Spain, who distinguished herself in the Havana salons around 1810 performing Haydn and Mozart. His father, Don Nicolás Ruiz, was a civil servant in the colonial administration. As is often the case in well-to-do families, the father wanted his only son to become a lawyer, an officer or an administrator – but not a musician. Although proud of his wife's musical talents and flattered by his son's nascent artistic abilities, Espadero's father would only permit half an hour's piano lesson every day. But young Espadero's talent proved too strong. From an early age he showed exceptional ability at the piano. With his mother's complicity young Espadero would play the piano several hours every day.

=== Musical training: 1840–1853 ===
Espadero never went to school and thus never enjoyed a structured formal education. What education he had received came from pieces and fragments from European, especially Spanish, culture, from selected and very mixed readings and from the surroundings of Cuban upper-class society. Havana had an opera house, the Teatro Colón, but the only operas, sung and acted by imported itinerant opera troupes, were mostly by Bellini, Donizetti and later Verdi.

On July 8, 1844, Polish pianist and composer Julian Fontana, a close friend of Frédéric Chopin, gave a series of concerts and recitals in Havana playing works by Liszt, Chopin, Thalberg and himself. This was the first time that music by Chopin was played in Cuba. Fontana stayed a year and a half (until November 1845) in Havana giving concerts, composing and teaching. Espadero was among Fontana's piano students.

By the time he was twenty, he had already traces of the withdrawn and unsociable character that would grow into in middle and later life. Alejo Carpentier characterizes him thus:

He did not have friends his own age, living exclusively with his family, under the constant vigilance of his mother. (...) He was sixteen when his father, without previous warning, dropped dead in his presence. This blow, the widowhood, the long mourning period, further reduced, if that were possible, Espadero's horizon. He would not go out, did not accept invitations, and would not frequent the promenades. He spent his days reading, drawing, and composing. At twilight, he would go to a music store close to his house to play the piano until eight o'clock at night. He could not tolerate a presence at his side at those moments. His adolescent neurosis became more pronounced with the passing of time, making him appear unsociable, sullen or weird.

=== Later life and death: 1870–1890 ===
Carpentier postulates that Espadero came to believe that in his youth he had been overly influenced by bravura piano music by composers such as Sigismond Thalberg, Émile Prudent, and Joseph Ascher, among others. He then turned to composing according to classical European musical forms. He wrote a piano trio, a scherzo, a sonata, and various longer études. None of it he saw in print. As soon as Espadero started to eschew the bravura pieces of the day, publishers were no longer interested in his music.

This rejection of his more serious efforts may have contributed his state of mind. The death of his mother in 1885 came as an almost devastating blow to him. Although he was now free to travel and leave Cuba, he did exactly the opposite – he became a total recluse. During his last years Espadero isolated himself almost totally from society, living only for his cats and his piano. Carpentier writes: He distanced himself from his colleagues, gruffly reproaching them for not having created a serious institution for the teaching of music. This anti-social behaviour may have been aggravated by obsessive–compulsive disorder (OCD). The most recent of Espadero's biographers writes that Espadero could not enter a house without having to rearrange the furniture to suit his orderliness.

Even his sudden and tragic death had its cause in Espadero's neurotic behaviour. For a long time he had had the habit of taking baths in alcohol. On August 22, 1890, he again took an alcohol bath. After the bath, however, he did not rub himself completely dry. When he tried to extinguish a gas light, he was suddenly engulfed by flames and suffered horrifying burns. He died eight days later. Considering the mental state of Espadero prior to his death and his long years of neurotic and increasingly bizarre behaviour, some of his biographers speculated that his death was actually a suicide.

Since Espadero died childless, his estate was scattered. Much of it, among them many unprinted manuscripts, is considered lost.

== Notable students ==
Notable students include Carlos Alfredo Peyrellade, Haitian pianist and founder of the Carlos Alfredo Peyrellade Conservatories in Cuba.

== Discography ==
- Cecilio Tieles, Piano: Espadero - Obras para piano (Works for Piano). EGREM CD 0787. 2006
  - 1. La Reina de Chipre (The Queen of Cyprus), Contradanza (1859) 1.34
  - 2. La Erminia. Contradanza (1858) 1.27
  - 3. Un Chubasco a Tiempo (A Downpour in Time). Contradanza (1859). 1.34
  - 4. La Rosalía Bustamante. Contradanza. (1859). 1.34
  - 5. Balada (Ballad). (1869) Op. 20. 8.08
  - 6. Scherzo, Op. 58 (1875) 8.04
  - 7. 2da Balada. Op. 57 (1874) 13.19
  - 8. Barcarola. Op. 18 (1867) 7.57
  - 9. La Sacerdotisa (The Woman Priest). Contradanza (1859). 1.41
  - 10. Armando Linares, Cameraman, Producer and Director: Domador de Notas (documentary-2002, Tarragona)

== Sources ==
- Carpentier, Alejo. Music in Cuba. Edited by Timothy Brennan. Translated by Alan West-Durán. Minneapolis: University of Minnesota Press, 2001.
- Fetis, F.J. Biographie Universelle des Musiciens. Édité par M. Arthur Pougin. Vol. 1. 2 vols. Paris: Librairie de Firmin-Didot Et Cie., 1878.
- Tieles, Cecilio. Espadero, lo hispánico musical en Cuba. Barcelona: Imprenta Agil Offset, S. A., 1994.
- Gottschalk, Louis Moreau. Notes of a Pianist. Reprint of 1964 edition. Ed. Jeanne Behrend. Princeton: Princeton University Press, 2006.
- Morelet, Arthur. Voyage dans L'Amerique Centrale L'Ile de Cuba et le Yucatan. Vol. 1. 2 vols. Paris: Gide et J. Baudry, 1857.
