= Frank Fernández (pianist) =

Cuban pianist, teacher and composer (born 1944)

Frank Fernández Tamayo (born Mayarí, Oriente, 16 March 1944) is a Cuban pianist, teacher and composer.

Fernández began playing the piano at age four and began lessons with his mother, Altagracia Tamayo, at age five. Tamayo was the director of the Obrón Academy in Mayarí. He was later taught by Esteban Forés in Mayarí. As an young man, Fernández moved to Havana, where he played in nightclubs and cabarets. He was admitted to the Amadeo Roldán Conservatory, where he was taught by Margot Rojas.

Critics have described Fernández as "a man touched by the divine," "one of the master interpreters of the most sublime moments of music in the world" or "someone without precedent, an unforgettable pianist,". Fernández has written more than 650 works in different formats, from ballets, choirs and symphonies to arrangements of popular music, as well as television and radio themes. He has worked with Silvio Rogíguez, Vicente Feliú, and Pancho Amat.

On August 18, 2015, at age 71, Fernandez made his U.S. performance debut at the Ravinia Festival, in Highland Park, Illinois.

== Compositions ==
- Las Casas
- Vértigo de Lluvia

== Discography ==
- Frank Fernandez Y Sus 2 Pianos (1960)
- Encuentro de música latinoamericana (1972)
- Danzas cubanas- Ignacio Cervantes (Frank Fernández) (1975)
- 4to concierto de Beethoven (1978)
- Música de la banda sonora original del serial "La gran rebelión" (1981)
- Lecuona (Danzas para piano) - Gershwin (Rhapsody in Blue) (1985)
- Beethoven-Schumann ciclo grandes maestros del piano (1987)
- Desde la música Vol. 1 (1988)
- Bach-Chopin ciclo grandes maestros del piano (1989)
- Tchaikovsky-Gershwin (1992)
- Cubano y universal (1994)
- Desde la música (1994)
- Lecuona-Cervantes (1995)
- Liszt-Mozart-Schumann (1997)
- Todo Mozart (1999)
- Todo Cervantes (2001)
- Todo Saumell (2001)
- Tierra Brava (2002)
- Integral nocturnos de Chopin (2002)
- Amor y dolor (2003)
- Sonatas mas famosas de Beethoven Vol. 1 (2003)
- Gershwin-Mozart (2004)
- Hasta la victoria siempre (2005)
- Lecuona-Cervantes (2005)
- Sonatas mas famosas de Beethoven Vol. 2 (2005)
- Homenaje a Gades. La rebelión (2005)
- Dos trovadores (EGREM) (2007)
- Con el alma en las manos (DVD) (2007)
- Novia mía (2010)
- Hágase la luz (EGREM) (2011)
