= Juan Piñera =

Cuban musician (born 1949)

Juan Piñera (born 1949 in Havana) is a Cuban musician who during his long career has covered a wide professional spectrum as performer, composer, professor and musical adviser.

== Studies ==
Juan Piñera took his first piano lessons from his sister Ninfa María Piñera. After some time he continued his piano studies with Cuban professor César Pérez Sentenat and with Silvio Rodríguez Cárdenas at Conservatorio Alejandro García Caturla in Marianao, Havana. At the same time, he studied with Argentinean harpsichordist Lidia Guerberof.

In 1968 Piñera followed up with his piano studies at the Escuela Nacional de Artes, where he received instruction from Silvio Rodríguez Cárdenas, Ninowska Fernández-Britto and Ana Martínez Estrada. After graduating in 1972, he studied musical composition with José Ardévol and Roberto Valera at the Instituto Superior de Arte (ISA). He also studied under Margot Rojas Mendoza.

== Professional activity ==
As a composer, Piñera has received numerous commissions to write original music for theater plays such as Il Piacere, Amor con amor se paga and La taza de café. He has also closely collaborated with dance companies such as Danza Contemporanea de Cuba, Conjunto Folklórico Nacional, Danza del Caribe, Danza Combinatoria and the National Ballet of Cuba, for which he has composed the original music of three ballets. He has also produced and directed a weekly radio program dedicated to promote contemporary music.

== Work ==
Juan Piñera has created an ample catalog that include numerous compositions for soloists, symphonic, chamber and vocal ensembles, as well as music for TV programs, movies and didactical purposes. He was one of the founders of the Cuban Laboratorio Nacional de Música Electroacúsitica, where he has composed an extensive list of pieces that include: “Pirandelliana”, for sound tape and two actors, “Tres de Dos”, “Imago”, for guitar and sound tape, “Germinal”, “Cuando el Aura es Aurea, o la muy triste historia de de los ocho minutos con treinta y ocho segundos” (for soprano sax and sound tape), “Pampano y Cascabel”, for guitar and sound tape and “Opus 28 No.1, o de la Gota de Agua”, for sound tape.

== Awards ==
Among many others, Piñera has received two awards (for symphonic and electroacoustic compositions) from the National Union of Writers and Artists of Cuba (UNEAC) and the First award in the Experimental Music International Competition of Bourges, in 1984.

== See also ==
Music of Cuba
