= Harold Gramatges =

Cuban composer, pianist, and teacher (1918–2008)

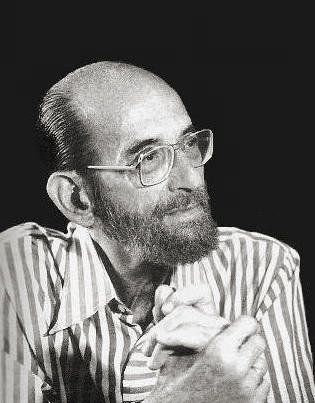

Harold Gramatges (26 September 1918 – 16 December 2008) was a Cuban composer, pianist, and teacher.

Gramatges was born in Santiago, Cuba. In 1941, he entered the conservatory in Santiago de Cuba to study under professor Dulce María Serret, and went on to study composition at the Municipal Conservatoire of Havana with Amadeo Roldán and José Ardévol (Rodriguez 2001), and with professor Flora Mora.In 1942, he travelled to United States to complete his studies at Berkshire Music Center under Aaron Copland (composition) and Serge Koussevitzky (conducting) (Rodriguez 2001).

He later founded and directed Cuba's Municipal Conservatory Orchestra, where he worked as professor of Harmony, Composition, Aesthetics and Music History. In 1958, he received the Reichold of Caribbean and Central America Prize, conferred by the Detroit Orchestra for his Sinfonía en mi. In 1959, he created the Musical Department at Casa de las Américas. He has spent his life working on transforming and developing musical education in Cuba. In 1961 and 1964, he was the Cuban Ambassador to France.

His work tends to bridge the forms of contemporary classical and modern Cuban or Latin American music. His catalog includes symphonic, chamber, vocal and incidental music for theater and movies. He died in December 2008 in La Habana, Cuba.

== Works ==
- Music about Juan Ramón Jiménez, Góngora, Rafael Alberti and Justo Rodríguez Santos texts;
- Icaro, for percussion and piano. Ballet as request of Alicia Alonso;
- Sonata for piano;
- Duet for flute and piano;
- trio for clarinet, violoncello and piano;
- Prelude for Mensaje al futuro Ballet;
- Symphony in mi;
- Caprice for flute, clarinet, viola and violoncello;
- Concertino for piano and wind instruments;
- Serenade for strings orchestras (Serenata para cuerdas), 1947;
- Two Cuban dances (Montuna and Sonera);
- Sinfonietta for orchestra;
- Triptico for voice and piano (having texts of José Martí);
- Woodwind quintet;
- Toccata for Bandoneon;
- In Memorian homage to Frank País, La Muerte de un Guerrillero for orchestra;
- Movil I for piano;
- Movil II for flute, corno, piano-celesta, Xilophono and percussion;
- Cantata for Abel;
- Concert for guitar and orchestra

== Listen ==
- listen samples in Amazon.com
