= Roberto Valera =

Cuban composer and pedagogue

- Born: 1938 (age 86–87); Havana, Cuba
- Occupations: Classical composer; Academic teacher
- Organizations: Instituto Cubano del Arte y la Industria Cinematográficos; Instituto Superior de Arte

Roberto Valera Chamizo (born 1938) is a Cuban composer and pedagogue who has a made a substantial contribution to the development of music in Cuba.

== Life and career ==
Born in Havana, Valera began his music studies in 1948 with Waldina Cortina, Ñola Sahig, José Ardévol, Edgardo Martín and Leo Brouwer in the Municipal Conservatory of Havana, where he also received singing lessons from soprano Zoila Gálvez in 1956. By 1965 Valera studied in Poland with renowned composers Witold Rudzinski and Andrzej Dobrowolski. He also received a degree in education from the Escuela Normal para Maestros in Havana, and a PhD in pedagogy from the University of Havana.

At the request of composer Leo Brouwer, Roberto Valera worked from 1961 to 1965 as a musical advisor at the Instituto Cubano del Arte y la Industria Cinematográficos (ICAIC), starting also a career as a film composer.

After returning from Poland, Valera was appointed as director of The Alejandro García Caturla Conservatory in Marianao, Havana, and in 1968 he became Head of Harmony and Contemporary Techniques at the National School of Arts Music School.

In 1976, Roberto Valera began a long term association with the Instituto Superior de Arte (ISA), serving as Dean and professor of composition, orchestration and contemporary techniques. He also founded the school’s Electroacoustic Music Studio.

Valera has also held different positions on the executive board of Unión Nacional de Escritores y Artistas de Cuba (UNEAC), including a term as President of its Music Section from 1990 to 1992.

== Work ==
Roberto Valera has composed an extensive catalog that includes music for soloists, chamber ensembles orchestra, and choir, as well as for numerous ballets, cartoons and films. Following a select list of Valeras works: The living composers project.

- Orchestral: Devenir, 1969; Concierto por la Paz, saxophone, orchestra, 1985; Extraplan, 1990; Yugo y estrella, 1995; Concierto de Cojimar, guitar, orchestra, 1998; Non divisi, string orchestra, 1999
- Chamber music: String Quartet, 1967; Tres Impertinencias, ensemble, 1971; Tierra de sol, cielo y tierra, ensemble, 1993; Glosas del tiempo recobrado, violin, cello, piano, percussion, 1994
- Choral: Ire a Santiago, mixed chorus, 1969; Cuatro Poemas de Nicolás Guillén, soprano, mixed chorus, orchestra, 2001
- Vocal: Conjuro, soprano, orchestra, 1968
- Piano: Doce Estudios Caribeños, 2002; Van Gogh's Blues Ear, 2002; Cuento Sonoro, 2004
- Electroacoustic: Ajiaco, tape, 1990; Palmas, tape, 1992; Periodo espacial, tape, 1993; Loa del camino, tape, 1999; Las Sombras no Abandonan, tape, 2000

== Awards ==
Among many recognitions, Roberto Valera has received the following:

- First Prize, Competition of the Cuban Ministry of Culture, 1985 (for Concierto por la Paz)
- National Award, UNEAC, 1989 (for his entire oeuvre)
- The Alejo Carpentier Medal
- The Félix Varela Medal
- The National Culture Award of the Cuban Council of the State
- The Ministry of Higher Education has also awarded him for his contribution to Cuban education

=== Other honors include ===
- The Basse Terre Medal in Guadeloupe
- The José Maria Heredia Medal of the province of Santiago (Cuba)
- The Karol Szymanowski Medal of the Polish Ministry of Art and Culture

== See also ==
- Music of Cuba
