= José Ardévol =

Cuban composer and conductor (1911–1981)

José Ardévol (13 March 1911, in Barcelona – 7 January 1981, in Havana) was a Cuban composer and conductor of Spanish derivation.

As a child, Ardévol studied under his father, Fernando, who was a musician and conductor. He emigrated to Cuba in 1930, and from 1934 to 1952 was the director of the Orquestra de cámara de la Habana. He was a professor in Cuba from 1936 to 1951, teaching in universities in Havana and Oriente. In 1942 he founded a movement called Grupo de renovación musical, which included several of his students devoted to his aesthetic ideals. He conducted the orchestra of the government's Ministry of Education beginning in 1959. He continued teaching, working as a professor of composition at Havana Conservatory from 1965 and at the National School of Music from 1968.

Ardévol's early compositions fall generally into the style of neoclassicism, but later in his life he began to explore the techniques of aleatory music and serialism. Some of his vocal works praise communism and address other political/revolutionary topics.

== Works ==
Note:this list is incomplete.

- 3 symphonies
- 2 Cuban suites for orchestra
- Forma, ballet, 1942
- La burla de Don Pedro a caballo, for soloists, chorus and orchestra, 1943
- Cantos de la Revolución, vocal work, 1962
- Che comandante, cantata, 1968
- Lenin, vocal work, 1970
- Sonata for guitar
- 6 Sonate a 3, chamber work
- 3 piano sonatas
- Tensiones, for piano left hand

Percussion Ensemble

- "Study in the form of Prelude and Fugue" for 14 percussionists and piano (1933)
- "Suite" for 14 percussionists and piano (1934)
- "Preludio a 11" for 10 percussionists and piano (1942)

== Discography ==
- "ORIGINS2: forgotten percussion works, vol. 2", Percussion Art Ensemble, directed by Ron Coulter, (Kreating SounD KSD 18, December 2020) https://percussionartensemble.bandcamp.com/album/origins2-forgotten-percussion-works-vol-2
- "ORIGINS: forgotten percussion works, vol. 1", Percussion Art Ensemble, directed by Ron Coulter, (Kreating SounD KSD 4, December 2012) https://percussionartensemble.bandcamp.com/album/origins-forgotten-percussion-works-vol-1
