= Classical guitar in Cuba =

The guitar (in the form of its direct ancestor, the “vihuela”) was the first instrument that was heard in Cuba after the conch horns, flutes and drums that the original aborigines used to play; as it was documented by Spanish chroniclers such as Bernal Díaz del Castillo. Through the centuries, the guitar has continued to be one of the most important and cherished instruments in Cuba, both in the practice of popular music as well as in the classical music tradition. Founded by renowned professors such as Clara Romero, Isaac Nicola, Clara (Cuqui) Nicola, Carlos Molina, and Marta Cuervo Riverón, the Cuban guitar school has acquired an excellent international reputation since the 20th century, represented by important instrumentalists and composers such as Leo Brouwer, Carlos Molina, José Rey de la Torre, Juan Antonio Mercadal and Joaquín Clerch, among many others.

== From the 16th to the 19th century ==
The guitar (as we know it today or in one of its historical versions) has been present in Cuba since the discovery of the island by Spain. As early as the 16th century, a musician named Juan Ortiz, from the village of Trinidad, is mentioned by famous chronicler Bernal Díaz del Castillo as “gran tañedor de vihuela y viola” (a great performer of the “vihuela” - a guitar ancestor - and the viol). Another “vihuelista”, Alonso Morón from Bayamo, is also mentioned in the Spanish conquest chronicles in the 16th century.

During the 17th century, Serafín Ramirez mentions a guitarist named Juan Navarro; and in 1722 we find small groups of guitars and “bandolas” in Santa Clara to entertain the population. We also find around this period of time some groups composed by guitars, “bandolas”, flutes and “pífanos” in Santiago de Cuba, which performed during the festivities of San Juan and Santiago Apóstol. At the end of the 17th century (around 1680) Lucas Pérez de Alaíz, a guitarist from Burgos, Spain, served as Chapel Master of the Santiago de Cuba Cathedral.

Domingo and Bartolomé Tamé offered lessons of guitar, singing and violin from 1819 to 1820 in Santiago de Cuba, where also professors Manegat and Bisbé, from Barcelona, taught guitar and singing. In the same city, the Catalan musician Juan Casamitjana offered guitar and singing lessons between 1832 and 1836, and guitarists Francisco Peralta and Juan Antonio Betancourt (disciples of Manegat) acquired great reputation. Also Fabricio Calzado Portuondo became famous as a guitarist and singer in Santiago de Cuba.

A disciple of famous Spanish guitarist Dionisio Aguado, José Prudencio Mungol was the first Cuban guitarist trained in the Spanish guitar tradition. In 1893 he performed at a much acclaimed concert in Havana, after returning from Spain. Mungol actively participated in the musical life of Havana and was a professor at the Hubert de Blanck conservatory.

Other Cuban guitarists from the 19th century are: Joaquín Inciarte (Santiago de Cuba) and Fernando Costa (Camaguey).

== The 20th century and beyond ==
Severino López was born in Matanzas. He studied guitar in Cuba with Juan Martín Sabio and Pascual Roch, and in Spain with renowned Catalan guitarist Miguel Llobet. He also studied musical composition in Barcelona. After returning to Cuba he founded a music academy in Havana, which he abandoned to establish his permanent residence in Santiago de Cuba. López composed many pieces and numerous transcriptions for the guitar, including one of the famous “La Comparsa” of Ernesto Lecuona. He was the professor of renowned Cuban guitarists José Rey de La Torre and Vicente González-Rubiera (Guyún). Severino López is considered the initiator in Cuba of the guitar school founded by Francisco Tárrega in Spain.

Other important Cuban guitarists from the first half of the 20th century were Ezequiel Cuevas, Francisqueta Vallalta and Félix Guerrero (Sr.).

Clara Romero (1888–1951), founder of the modern Cuban School of Guitar, studied in Spain with Nicolás Prats and in Cuba with Félix Guerrero. She inaugurated the guitar department at the Havana Municipal Conservatory in 1931, where she also introduced the teachings of the Cuban folk guitar style. She created the Guitar Society of Cuba (Sociedad Guitarrística de Cuba) in 1940, and also the “Guitar” (Guitarra) magazine, with the purpose of promoting the Society's activities. She was the professor of many Cuban guitarists including her son Isaac Nicola and her daughter Clara (Cuqui) Nicola.

After studying with his mother, Clara Romero, at the Havana Municipal Conservatory, Isaac Nicola (1916–1997) continued his training in Paris with Emilio Pujol, a disciple of Francisco Tárrega. He also studied the vihuela with Pujol and researched about the guitar's history and literature.

After returning to Cuba, Nicola engages on a period of performing activity which concludes in 1957, with a concert where he premiered the famous Danza Característica by Leo Brouwer. From now on, he devotes himself entirely to teaching, assisted by other dedicated collaborators, such as professors Marta Cuervo, Clara (Cuqui) Nicola (his own sister) and Marianela Bonet.

Nicola proceeded to restructure his mother's method and also added much of his own. He established the basis for a comprehensive guitar didactical system that, including the contribution of many others, was going to be applied to the academic formation of several generations of Cuban guitarists.

Two other important Cuban guitarists from that period of time were: José Rey de la Torre (1917–1944) and Juan Antonio Mercadal (1925–1998). Both of them traveled extensively as guitar performers and established themselves in the US. Rey de la Torre settled in California, while Mercadal became a resident of Miami, Florida, where he founded the Guitar School at the University of Miami.

== The modern Cuban Guitar School ==
After the Cuban revolution in 1959, Isaac Nicola and other professors such as Marta Cuervo, Clara (Cuqui) Nicola, Carlos Molina (guitarist), Marianela Bonet and Leopoldina Núñez were integrated to the national music schools system, where a unified didactical method was implemented. This was a nucleus for the later development of a national Cuban Guitar School with which a new generation of guitarists and composers collaborated.

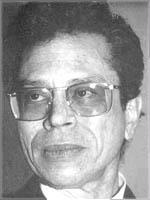
Leo Brouwer.

Maybe the most important contribution to the modern Cuban guitar technique and repertoire comes from Leo Brouwer (b. 1939). The grandson of Ernestina Lecuona, sister of Ernesto Lecuona, Brouwer began studying the guitar with his father and after some time continued with Isaac Nicola. He taught himself harmony, counterpoint, musical forms and orchestration before completing his studies at Juilliard School and Hartford University.

According to renowned Venezuelan guitarist Alirio Díaz, “Brouwer is an important part of this process, of the creation of today’s music, for which he has opened new ways and introduced the avant-garde in the guitar [technique and repertoire].”

Other guitarists that collaborated with the foundation of the modern Cuban Guitar School are: Jesús Ortega (b. 1935) and Idelfonso Acosta (b. 1939). The Cuban guitarist Elías Barreiro, established in the United States since 1966, has developed an important career as a performer and professor at Tulane University, New Orleans.

Leo Brouwer has defined the modern Cuban Guitar School as follows: “The Cuban Guitar School is the sum of technical elements, a repertoire and a sensibility from the guitarists and creators toward this instrument, the guitar.”

== The new generations ==
Since the 1960s, several generations of guitar performers, professors and composers have been formed under the Cuban Guitar School at educational institutions such as the Havana Municipal Conservatory, the Escuela Nacional de Artes (National Art Schools (Cuba)), and the Instituto Superior de Arte. Other guitarists, such as Manuel Barrueco, a concertist of international renown, developed their careers outside the country. Among many artists related to the Cuban Guitar School, we can mention the following names: Carlos Molina (guitarist), Sergio Vitier, Efraín Amador Piñero and Flores Chaviano, as well as: Armando Rodriguez Ruidiaz, Martín Pedreira, Lester Carrodeguas, Mario Daly, José Angel Pérez Puentes and Teresa Madiedo. A younger group may include guitarists:Rey Guerra, Félix Puig, José Armando Guzmán, Aldo Rodríguez Delgado, Alejandro González, Pedro Cañas, Leyda Lombard, Eduardo Martín, Walfrido Domínguez, Esteban Campusano, Francisco Rodriguez, Jorge Luis Zamora, Manuel Espinás, Alfredo Panebianco, Carlos Alberto Lloró, Jorge Luis Garcell, Alexis Méndez, Rubén González, Freddy Pérez, Rosa Matos, Iliana Matos, Rafael Padrón, Amed Dickinson, Marco Tamayo, Ernesto Tamayo, Rene Izquierdo, Miguel Bonachea, Edel Muñoz, Gerardo Perez Capdevila, Joaquín Clerch Yalil Guerra and Alí Arango.

== Compositions for guitar ==
Numerous Cuban composers, many of them guitarists themselves, have contributed to create a body of work that may support the didactic and aesthetic efforts of the Cuban Guitar School. Before 1959, some composers such as Amadeo Roldán, José Ardévol, Joaquín Nin Culmell, Natalio Galán and Harold Gramatges began composing music for the classical guitar.

Apart from Leo Brouwer, that may be considered the most important Cuban composer for the guitar during the 20th and the 21st century, other composers have also written original compositions, didactical music and transcriptions for the instrument. A list of composers may include:Carlos Fariñas, Jesús Ortega, Nilo Rodríguez, Flores Chaviano, Efraín Amador Piñero, Armando Rodriguez Ruidiaz, José Angel Pérez Puentes, Martín Pedreira, Julio Roloff and Yalil Guerra.

== See also ==
- Music of Cuba
