= Miguel Bonachea =

Cuban guitarist and professor

Miguel Bonachea (born Santa Clara, Cuba 1960) is a Cuban guitarist and professor.

== Academic background ==
Bonachea studied guitar with Rolando Moreno, Efraín Amador, and Flores Chaviano; and counterpoint with Armando Rodriguez Ruidiaz and Alfredo Diez Nieto, at the National School of Arts. He earned his bachelor's degree in Music at the Instituto Superior de Arte, in Havana, Cuba, under the guidance of professor Jesús Ortega.

== Work as guitarist ==
As a guitar soloist, Bonachea extensively toured throughout Europe, South America and the Caribbean, performing at such important events as the International Guitar Festivals of Havana, Martinique, Bogotá and Quito, the International Music Festival of Brno, Czech Republic, and the New Music Festival of Lima, Peru, among many others. He has also played as a guest soloist with several symphonic and chamber orchestras.

Most recently, Bonachea has established his residence in Florida, US, where he has performed at the series “Music in Miami” and “Three Sundays in July” and has also appeared as a guest soloist with the Florida Chamber Orchestra conducted by Marlene Urbay. Bonachea also plays frequently as a featured soloist at the Christ by the Sea, U.M.C. in Vero Beach.

== Work as professor ==
As a professor, Bonachea taught at the National School of Arts and the Instituto Superior de Arte in Havana, Cuba. He moved to Colombia in 1992, where he tenured as Dean of the Conservatory of Music named after Antonio Maria Valencia at the Institute of Fine Arts in Cali, until 2004. In the late 1990s Bonachea featured a series of successful workshops for music educators around different cities of Colombia, as well as master classes for students seeking a professional career. After 2004, he served as Head of the Area of Guitar at the University EAFIT in Medellin, Colombia, and he also taught a special course about guitar technique, interpretation and chamber music at the Corpas University in Bogotá, before moving to the US by the end of 2010.

== Contemporary music advocacy ==
Bonachea is an enthusiast advocate of contemporary music and has devoted part of his professional career to its advancement. In the 1980s, he was a co-founder of the National Laboratory of Electro-acoustic Music in Havana, led by composer Juan Blanco, a pioneer of electro-acoustic music in Latin America. Bonachea has been invited as a guest performer in residence at the “Laboratory for Researches on Electro-acoustics of Brussels”, Belgium, to participate in the creation of a composition titled “Guitarra Cubana” by Belgian composer Leo Küpper. Since the beginning of his career, Bonachea has included in his repertoire contemporary works from contemporary composers such as Leo Brouwer, Carlos Fariñas, Hector Angulo, Bernardo Cardona, Efraín Amador, Jose A. Pérez Puentes and Armando Rodriguez Ruidiaz, among others. Renowned composers Leo Küpper (Belgium), Moisés Bertrán (Spain), Andrés Posada (Colombia), and Yalil Guerra (Cuba-USA) have dedicated original pieces to Miguel Bonachea.

During his tenure at the Conservatory of Music in Cali, he created and served as the artistic director of the Jornadas de la Música Contemporanea (Days of Contemporary Music), an annual series of concerts devoted to encourage young musicians to play new works and to create an audience for contemporary music. He also produced a series of CDs under the title “Conciertos Colombianos” featuring young talents and relevant Colombian composers in the field of popular music.

== Awards and recognitions ==
At the II International Guitar Competition of Havana, Miguel Bonachea received an Award as well as the Special prize from the Jury's President of Honor, the Special prize for the Best Performance of Cuban Music, and a Special prize from the Catalan luthier Farr-Pratt. He also received Awards from the National Union of Writers and Artists of Cuba (UNEAC) and the “Amadeo Roldan” Cuban National Competition.

== Musical compositions ==
- Paisaje de Sueños (Landscape of Dreams) – Electroacoustic media
- El Peldaño Omitido, after a poem by Angel Escobar Varela (The Omitted Rung) - Electroacoustic media.

== See also ==
- Music of Cuba
