= Eduardo Morales Caso =

Cuban composer (born 1969)

Eduardo Morales Caso (born March 10, 1969, in Havana), is a Cuban composer.

== Biographical notes ==
Eduardo Morales Caso is a prominent figure within the contemporary musical composition, with an international artistic trajectory. A catalogue of his works and his biographic profile has been catalogued in the Iberoamerican Dictionary of Music (Diccionario Iberoamericano de la Música): "The songs of Eduardo Morales are included in the best of a compositional tradition that comes from the great composers of the last century Cuban composers... careful structural development, notable lyric flow, strong dramatic accent, achieving a total correspondence between the sound background and the 'ethos' of the lyrics."

== Formation and musical career ==
He began his musical formation studying accordion, which he substitutes by the piano and clarinet upon joining the Conservatory, always keeping a clear vocation toward composition. In 1988 he is accepted at the Superior Institute of Art (ISA) of Havana, where he graduated in 1994 as a Graduate in Music with a major in composition. He studied with Carlos Fariñas, Joaquín Clerch, Victoria Eli, Marta Cuervo and Harold Gramatges, among others.

After serving for some time as a professor of harmony, musical analysis, and counterpoint at ISA, in 1996 he received a scholarship to continue studies at the Conservatorio Superior de Música de Madrid under the guidance of professor Antón García Abril, to whom he dedicated as an homage his first symphonic piece: Los ojos del Guadiana and Especulaciones I, II, III for flute, clarinet and bassoon trio.

During the year 2000 he obtains a Doctorate in Music from the Universidad Autónoma de Madrid, under the guidance of the Spanish professor and composer José Peris Lacasa. He currently lives in Spain where he works as a professor and composer.

He is a member of SGAE and participates in the Talea group, a society of young composers that live in Spain, dedicated to the promotion of contemporary music.

His works have been premiered and performed in the VI, VII, VIII y IX, Festival de La Habana, Festival de Música y Danza de Granada, Madrid, Barcelona, Valladolid, Mexico, Switzerland, Canada, Colombia, France, Japan and Holand.

== Awards ==
First prize from the first International Contest for Symphonic Orchestra "José Asunción Flores" in Paraguay.

First prize from UNEAC National Contest (Cuba).

First prize from UNEAC National Contest (Cuba), 1991.

== Works ==
Orchestra and soloist

- 1993 Movimiento sinfónico, for piano and orchestra.
- 1996 Monólogo de la muerte, for soprano and string orchestra with lyrics by Eduardo Morales. Dedicated to the soprano Mayda Prado.
- 1999 El príncipe feliz. Concierto for violin and orchestra in one movement. Dedicated to the Australian violinist Mitchell Sven Andersson.

Symphony orchestra

- 1993 Rítmicas I, II, III
- 1997 Los ojos del Guadiana
- 2000 Homenaje Guaraní, fantasy for symphony orchestra.

String orchestra

- 1998 Bulerías

Choir

- 1993 Vuela un cisne salvaje por el viento or Por tu corazón, lyrics by Eduardo Morales

Women's choir

- 1993 Y a mis fuentes les nace el agua para tu alma or Para tu alma, lyrics by Eduardo Morales

Voice and ensemble

- 1992 Todos son inocentes, lyrics by Manuel Gutiérrez Nájera).
- 1992 Verde mar, lyrics by Eduardo Morales
- 1994 Esta larga tarea de aprender a morir, lyrics by Félix Pita Rodríguez.

Voice and piano

- 1989 Mi corza blanca, with words by Rafael Alberti.
- 1989 Un milagro, with words by José Martí.
- 1990 ¡Ay del río!, with words by Eduardo Morales; Cómo andar tus aguas; Dime dónde está; El río ya no está, Premio ganador del Concurso UNEAC de 1991; ¡Oh, qué es la tristeza! First Prize at Concurso UNEAC, 1991; Te traigo el ancho mar.
- 1991 Ancho es mi corazón, with words by José Martí
- 1993 Ave María; Dos venaditos with words by Nicolás Guillén; El vacío; En los álamos del monte, with words by José Martí; La flor del aire, with words by Eduardo Morales; Oración; Señor haced de mi un instrumento de tu paz, with words by Saint Francis of Assisi
- 1994 Cómo no llorar, with words by Eduardo Morales; Coplas a Don Quijote; Dónde ocultas tu corazón; La noche; Para tu alma; Si se deshoja a dónde irá, with words by Rabindranath Tagore; Y cuentan que... Eduardo Morales
- 1995 Canción triste y última, with words by Sor Juana Inés de la Cruz; Cuando yo me haya ido, with words by Arthur Rimbaud; Puedo morir de amor; Soy de raza lejana,

Y en las sombras lo profundo, with words by Eduardo Morales.

- 1996 A orillas del mar, with words by Luis de Góngora; Canción de amor de Iván el Terrible, with words by Eduardo Morales. La fuente que mana y corre, with words by San Juan de la Cruz; No hay nostalgias.
- 1997 Where I Can't Find You, with words by Eduardo Morales.
- 1998 La más breve nostalgia; Waiting for my Moon.
- 1999 Secrets of the Wind; Speak to Your Heart, with words by James Joyce; Vuelve mar; with words by Eduardo Morales.
- 2000 Galloping Princess, with words by Retta Dawson.
- 2001 La rosa enferma, with words by William Blake ("The Sick Rose").

Solo voice

- 1993 Elegía, with words by Eduardo Morales.

Ensemble

- 1988 Alba, Primer Premio de Composición de la Academia Musical Amadeo Roldán.
- 1990 Trilce (Allegro de sonata); Cuatro piezas para clarinete en Eb y piano,1993: El saltamontes , Se entristeció la luna, Primavera bien temperada, Autorretrato de Prokofiev cuando era niño
- 1997 Especulaciones, I, II, III; Habanera de concierto; El corazón delator. Ciclo de siete piezas para trío: Canto de la Alondra; Prokofiev en la milicia; Primavera no bien temperada; Soñaba que estaba enamorado; Autorretrato de Prokofiev cuando era niño; La muerte buena; Toccata con fuoco;
- Rítmicas I, II, III, IV, V, para quinteto clásico de viento madera. Premio ganador del Concurso UNEAC de 1994; Nunca habéis visto la mar.
- 1998 Habanera de concierto
- 2000 Allegro Concertante; Variante Concertante.
- 2001 Memorias sobre un hombre colérico, quinteto de violín I, violín II, viola, violonchelo y contrabajo.

Solo instrument

- 1989 Cinco escenas infantiles para piano: Ronda de duendes, La luna también ama, Nubes, Canción de cuna, Cazando mariposas
- 1998 Sonata sola bien temperada.
- 2000 El Jardín de Lindaraja Primer Premio del Concurso Internacional de Guitarra Andrés Segovia en Almuñecar, La Herradura, Granada, 2001.
- 2001 L'anima sola, Toccata Diavolesca.

Electroacoustic music

- 1994 Así se muere, La noche oscura.

Incidental music

- 1995 La noche, de Abilio Estévez. Premio Nacional UNEAC.

== See also ==
Music of Cuba
