= Alejandro González (guitarist) =

Cuban guitarist (born 1973)

- Born: 5 November 1973 (age 52); Havana, Cuba
- Genres: Classical music, Latin music, Cuban music
- Occupations: Guitarist, arranger, composer, and professor
- Instrument: Classical guitar

Alejandro González González (born November 5, 1973, in Havana, Cuba) is a Cuban musician, guitarist and professor with notable work in the Dominican Republic.

== Background ==
Alejandro González studied at the Corservatory Amadeo Roldán, and got his bachelor and post-graduate at The University of Arts of Cuba (ISA), in Havana, Cuba. At ISA, he specialized on guitar, in addition, he obtained a degree in art psychology and pedagogy. He has received classes from Mario Hernández, Mailyn Selis, Dagberto Arguiz, Dagoberto Arguiz, Sergio Morales y Jesús Ortega. He also has received master classes from great guitar masters, including Isaac Nicola, Eduardo Fernández, Leo Brouwer, Costas Cotsiolis, Eliot Fisk, Shin-Ichi Fukuda, Alirio Díaz, Joaquín Clerch, among others. He has also attended master classed with David Russell, Wolfgang Lendle, Álvaro Pierri, Timo Korhonen, John Williams, Pepe Romero, and others.

== Teaching ==
Alejandro has taught in Cuba, at the Amadeo Roldán conservatory, at the National Music School and at The University of Arts of Cuba. In Dominican Republic he taught at the Institute of Culture and Arts (ICA) and the Center for Culture in Santiago de los Caballeros. There he established the Cibao's Academy of Music (Amcib).

He has also recorded for radio, television and discographies.

== Work in Dominican Republic ==
In addition to help the development of new artistic talents by teaching, Alejandro is known for his promotion of classical guitar, especially at the Cibao region. He founded the Cibao's Academy of Music and organizes the Cibao's International Guitar Workshop.

=== Cibao's Academy of Music (Amcib) ===
In 2009, Alejandro founded the Cibao's Academy of Music (Amcib), a non-pfrofit school that visions to promote new musical talents emphasizing local identity and strengthening human spiritual values. The academy also opened campus in Esperanzaand Mao. Besides the classes, the academy had organized several concerts around the country and the Cibao's International Guitar Workshop. Some of the concerts are "Viva la Guitarra" with performances in Santiago, Navarrete, Mao and Baní; the concert to commemorate 129 anniversary of Valverde province in 2009 and 'La guitarra en Iberoamérica' with guitarist Yalit González at the Gran Teatro del Cibao in Santiago de los Caballeros in 2011.

=== Cibao's International Guitar Workshop ===
Cibao's International Guitar Workshop has been organized in 2014 and 1015 in Santiago de los Caballeros. It brings together classical guitar students, teachers and interested to master classes and concerts. The workshop has had as invited guitarist René Izquierdo, guitarist Mayaletse Grillo and artist Alejandro de La Vega. The workshop concerts have been held at Centro León, cathedral of St. James in Santiago, and regional campus of UASD.

=== Dúo Alma ===
In 2013, Alejandro started Dúo Alma with guitarist Mayaletse Grillo. The duo has offered several recitals Santiago including Centro León, where they shared with French guitarist Alex Jacquemin. They have also played in Cuba

== Tours and concerts ==
Alejandro González has performed concerts as soloist and with orquestra on many events including tours and festivals in Cuba, Dominican Republic, Nicaragua, Cayman Islands, Italy, Germany, Spain and Poland. Alejandro has been an invited soloist to several orchestras including Orquesta Sinfónica del Cibao conducted by Ruddy Capellán, Orquesta Juvenil del Cibao, Orquesta de Cámara del Conservatorio de Guanabacoa conducted by Ana Miriam Hernández, Orquesta de Cámara Música Eterna conducted by Guido López Gavilán, Orquesta Sinfónica Nacional de Cuba conducted by Enrique Pérez Mesa and by Iván del Prado, Orquesta Sinfónica de Holguín y Orquesta Sinfonietta de la Habana conducted by María Elena Mendiola, Orquesta Sinfónica de Camaguey conducted by Mónica Alvarado, and Orquesta Sinfónica de Matanzas dconducted by Marcelo Bussiki. Alejandro also performed in concerts organized by Cibao's Academy of Music.

Alejando González has performed in concerts the music of Bach, Scarlatti, Handel, Francisco Tárrega, Manuel de Falla, Mangoré, Miguel Llobet, Antonio Lauro, Ñico Rojas, Leo Brouwer, among others.
