= Chaviano =

Chaviano is a surname. Notable people with the surname include:

- Daína Chaviano (born 1957), Cuban-American novelist
- Francisco Chaviano, Cuban human rights activist and mathematics professor
- Flores Chaviano (born 1946), Cuban composer, guitarist, professor, and orchestral conductor
