= Carlos Molina (guitarist) =

Cuban guitarist and professor (born 1946)

Carlos Molina (born 1946 in Havana, Cuba) is a Cuban guitarist and professor.

== Academic background ==
Carlos Molina is an acclaimed Cuban guitarist, lauded as founder of the Cuban Guitar School. He studied music at Hubert de Blanck Conservatory and the Amadeo Roldán National Conservatory in Havana, Cuba. He was a disciple of Isaac Nicola and graduated in 1969, from both the National Conservatory and from the Law School at the Havana University. At a later time, Molina continued his professional training as a classical guitarist with Abel Carlevaro, Alirio Díaz, and Alberto Ponce.

== Work as guitarist ==
In 1970, closely following his graduation, Carlos Molina won the First Prize at the National Guitar Competition and subsequently went on a concert tour through several European cities. Since then, he has performed in more than twenty countries, at such prestigious venues as the Kennedy Center in Washington DC, the Metropolitan Opera House in New York City, the St. Petersburg Philharmonic Major Hall, the Dvorak Hall of Prague, the Ateneo of Madrid, the Chopin Hall of Warsaw, the Zeneakademia of Budapest, the Hall of Mirrors at the Palatial Palace in Bratislava, the Salle du Conservatoire d’Orleans, the Sala Carlos Chávez in Mexico and the Teatro Amadeo Roldán in Cuba, among many others. For two years, Molina toured worldwide as solo guitarist of principal ballerina Alicia Alonso and the Cuban National Ballet.

Molina has frequently shared the stage with famous guitarists such as Leo Brouwer, Turibio Santos, Alirio Díaz, Benjamin Verdery, Carlos Barbosa-Lima, and Nikita Koshkin. He has also participated in international guitar festivals at Pescara, Potenza, Brno, Rust, Córdoba, Hondarribia, Vélez-Málaga, Aranda del Duero, Linares, Coria, Bordeaux, Limousin, Vendôme, Esztergom, Rotenburg, Bratislava, Stockholm and Fribourg. Carlos Molina has premiered many pieces dedicated to him. In 1968, Cuban famous composer and guitarist Leo Brouwer created at his request "Canticum," a composition in which he included avant-garde techniques never used before in the guitar repertoire. A list of composers that have dedicated pieces to Molina include the Russian Nikita Koshkin (guitar duo Return of the Winds – 2002) as well as Olivier Chassain, Gérard Drozd, Roberto Fabbri, Jon Christopher Nelson, Orlando Jacinto García, Carlos Rafael Rivera, Timothy Melbinger, Antonino Hernández Lisazo, Armando Rodriguez Ruidiaz, Carlos Atilano, and Luis Manuel Molina (Molina's brother), with his Capricho Místico para una Guitarra Solitaria.

== Didactical work ==
Carlos Molina began teaching at the National Conservatory of Havana soon after his graduation in 1969 and in 1975 he established History of the Guitar as an obligatory class. He was appointed as guitar professor at the Instituto Superior de Arte (ISA) in 1976, and became Chairman of the guitar department two years later.

From 1973 to 1975, Molina wrote, directed and produced a live television series in Cuba titled Cinco Líneas y Cuatro Espacios (Five Lines and Four Spaces), an educational music program that covered aspects of music in general.

Molina has published various articles about the guitar, beginning in 1971 with a series for La Gaceta de Cuba, the official magazine of the National Union of Writers and Artists of Cuba (Unión Nacional de Escritores y Artistas de Cuba, UNEAC). In 1976, he published articles in Revista Bohemia, Revista Verde Olivo, and the National Library publications. In the United States he has published two articles in the Guitar Review (1988), and in Spain he published La Guitarra en la Historia from the Colección Bordón, Córdoba (1999).

Starting in 1975 at the Havana University, the Biblioteca Nacional, and the Casa de las Américas in Cuba, Molina has presented over seventy lectures internationally, on subjects that range from the history of the guitar to its composers and technique. He has also lectured at the Congreso de Intelectuales Cubanos in Madrid; at the Arizona State University; Florida International University; Rotenberg International Festival in Germany; Laval University in Quebec; National Guitar Summer Workshop in New Milford, CT; Festival Internacional de Córdoba and Festival de Coria in Spain; Rust International Festival in Austria; and at Florida Atlantic University in Boca Raton, Florida.

A tireless promoter of the instrument, Molina has directed and produced nine guitar festivals, starting with the First Guitar Festival of Cuba in 1976, "Panorama de la Guitarra", and the First International Guitar Festival of Cuba in 1978, "Encuentro de Guitarristas de América Latina y el Caribe". In 1991 and again in 2002, Molina was selected by the Guitar Foundation of America to direct and produce its International Convention and Competition in Miami. In 2004, Molina created Miami's First International Guitar Festival and Competition.

Molina has been a member of the guitar faculty at the Miami-Dade College since 1983, after establishing his residence in the United States. In 1987 he created the guitar program at Florida International University where he served as a professor for eleven years. Also in 1987, he founded the Miami Classical Guitar Society, an organization dedicated to promote the art and appreciation of the Classical Guitar within the Miami community and South Florida, and produced a series of thirty seven radio programs titled Tertulia Musical for Radio y Televisión Martí, in which he presented different aspects of Cuban music.

Molina has offered master classes and summer courses in the University of Veracruz (Mexico), Hondarribia, Bisceglie, Bordeaux, Brno, Périgueux, and other locations in Europe. He has also been on the faculty of the National Guitar Summer Workshop in Connecticut. He has participated as a juror for many international guitar competitions, including seven times at the Guitar Foundation of America, in Oberlin University, Mérida, La Jolla, Houston, Québec and San Antonio, Coria in Spain, Bari in Italy, UTD in Dallas, Rust in Austria, Fiuggi in Italy, Vélez in Málaga, and the island of Sardinia in Italy.

Carlos Molina has been mentioned in reputable books and publications such as Cuban Music from A to Z by Helio Orovio (Duke University, 2004); Diccionario de la Música Española e Hispanoamericana, (Madrid, Sociedad General de Autores, 2000); Leo Brouwer by Isabelle Hernandez (Bogota Colombia, 2000); Antonio Lauro by Alejandro Bruzual (Caracas, 2000); Encuentro de la Cultura Cubana, Musica by Cristobal Diaz Alaya (Madrid 1999/2000); Diccionario de la Música Cubana by Helio Orovio (Colombia, 1993); Música Cubana, by Cristobal Diaz Ayala (Puerto Rico 1981); and Gitarren-Lexikon, by Józef Powroźniak (Poland and Germany 1979). In 1996, the Board of County Commissioners of Miami-Dade County declared 31 May as the Day of Maestro Carlos Molina.

== See also ==
- Classical Guitar in Cuba
