= Martín Pedreira =

Cuban guitarist, composer and professor

Martín Pedreira (born 1952, Havana, Cuba) is a Cuban guitarist, composer and professor.

== Academic background ==
Martín Pedreira began to teach himself how to play the guitar at the age of ten. In 1968, he initiated his formal academic studies at the National School of Arts of Havana with Maestro Isaac Nicola and graduated in 1975. Pedreira continued his professional training at the Superior Institute of Arts, in the same city, under the guidance of guitarists Isaac Nicola and Leo Brouwer, where he obtained a graduate diploma in 1983. Pedreira also conducted post-graduate studies with Maestros Alirio Díaz and María Luisa Anido. In 2002, he received a master's degree from the University of the Arts in Havana, and in 2007 a PhD in Arts at the same institution.

== Guitarist ==
Pedreira has given presentations as a concert guitarist throughout his country, Cuba, as well as in Mexico, Germany, and Spain, where he performed at the Art Lyceum of Madrid in 1995, sponsored by the Spanish Guitar Society. As a soloist, he has taken part in important events such as the Andrés Segovia Competition in Granada in 1981, the First Latin American Encounter of Guitarists, and other International Festivals. He has also participated in chamber music activities by integrating ensembles such as the Cuarteto Imaginario in 1998, the guitar orchestra Sonatas Habaneras in 2000, and the Khitara quartet in 2010.

== Professor ==
Martín Pedreira has worked as a guitar professor since 1975 and has carried out important studies related to guitar didactics and technique linked to physiology. He has also given numerous postgraduate seminars and courses in Cuba, Spain, and Mexico. Pedreira is currently a guitar professor at the University of the Arts in Havana.

== Composer ==
As a composer, he includes in his catalog numerous pieces for guitar and other instruments such as: Suite simple, Preludio y son, La canción del son, and La comparsa del gallo for voice, guitar and percussion. Pedreira has also composed numerous didactical pieces, among them the albums Divertimentos I (25 pieces), Music for David (10 pieces), Ten Studies, Brief Preludes, and others.

== Other activities ==
From 1985, Martín Pedreira worked at Editora Nacional de Música de Cuba, where he translated and published transcriptions of pedagogical guitar works such as those from Iranian guitarist Joseph Urshalmi. He has also published transcriptions of popular guitarists as José Antonio (Ñico) Rojas (1927–2008) and Vicente González-Rubiera (Guyún) (1908–1987) (Museum of Music Editions, 2013 and 2017 respectively). In 1990, Pedreira became a music adviser for the Festival Internacional de Guitarra de La Habana. He is coauthor, together with his professor Isaac Nicola of a Guitar Method in four volumes (Ediciones Atril, Havana, Cuba, 2000), which is a program of studies officially adopted by the National System of Artistic Education in Cuba. Since 2007, Pedreira has collaborated systematically with the National Museum of Music performing digital analysis and the transcription of scores from the Cuban heritage repertoire. Martín Pedreira is also the author of the books: Ergonomics of the Guitar: His Technique from the Corporal Perspective (Ediciones Cúpulas, Havana, Cuba, 2011) and History of the Guitar. Readings Selection (Museum of Music Editions, Havana, Cuba, 2017).

== Awards and recognitions ==
In December 2003, Martín Pedreira received a Diploma of Pedagogical Merit, awarded by the Ministries of Culture and Higher Education, and in 2007, the Distinction for Cuban Education.

== See also ==
Music of Cuba
