= Calixto Álvarez =

Cuban composer

Calixto Álvarez (Santa Isabel de las Lajas, Cuba, 1938) is a Cuban composer.

== Academic background ==
Calixto Álvarez was born on March 15, 1938, in Santa Isabel de las Lajas, Cienfuegos, Cuba, and began to play musical instruments when he was just five years old. Álvarez studied at the Santa Clara Conservatory and the National Conservatory of Havana. In 1958 he travelled to the United States, where he studied piano, organ and composition until 1966 at the Julius Hartt College of Music. At a later time, in 1967, he went to Poland where he studied at the Warsaw Superior School of Music with Andrzej Dobrowolsky, Włodzimierz Kotoński and other professors. Upon his return to Cuba he received instruction from Leo Brouwer, José Ardévol and Federico Smith

== Professional activity ==
Calixto Álvarez has composed music for diverse instruments and for instrumental and choral groups. He has excelled as incidental music composer for numerous theatre plays such as "Las impuras" and "La duodécima noche", presented by Teatro Estudio, as well as for "La dolorosa historia del amor secreto de don José Jacinto Milanés" (1974), from Abelardo Estorino. Álvarez has also composed several comedies, such as "Los musiquillos de Bremen" based on a story from Julio Babrusquinas, "Lisístrata", "Venus y Adonis" (an electroacoustic opera which consists on the adaptation of the homonim poem from William Shakespeare by Armando Suárez del Villar), he has also conducted the "Cantoría Infantil del Teatro Lírico Nacional de Cuba", for which he produced several musical comedies such as "Las aceitunas", "Siempre caperucita" and "El flautista de Hamelín". Calixto Álvarez has worked as advisor for CMBF Radio Station in Havana.

== Works ==
- Sonatina
- Quinteto de viento
- Trío opus 13 No. 72
- Tema y seis variaciones para piano (1967)
- Torus para contrabajo (1969)
- Poker para cuarteto de cuerdas (1970)
- Canon II para piano y banda magnetofónica (1981)
- Cuento electrónico para medios electroacústicos (1982)
- Canto Cardinal para contralto, percusión y piano
- Stripofumios y varsiflorios para orquesta

== Awards ==
Calixto Álvarez received the Alejo Carpentier Medal from the Cuban government for his contributions to Cuban culture in 2002.

== See also ==
- Music of Cuba
