= The Hexagonal Galleries =

The Hexagonal Galleries is an hour-long work by Cuban composer Armando Rodriguez Ruidiaz.

== Composition and structure ==
Based on a short story by Jorge Luis Borges, this piece was commissioned by the South Florida Composers Alliance and premiered at the Wolfson Campus Auditorium of the Miami Dade Community College in Miami, Florida, on 13 April 1992. The Hexagonal Galleries is comprised by seven sections named as follows:

1. The Hexagonal Galleries
2. The Mirror
3. The spiral Staircase
4. MCVMCVMCVMCVMCV
5. Labyrinth
6. Cryptographs
7. Limitless and Periodic

== Performance ==
The piece was performed by its composer, Armando Rodriguez Ruidiaz, along with Venezuelan composer Gustavo Matamoros and Cuban pianist Carmen Carrodeguas, all of them members of PUNTO Experimental Music Ensemble, a contemporary music group active in Miami, Florida, during the 1990s.
