= Bonachea =

Bonachea is a surname. Notable people with the surname include:

- Oscar Poey Bonachea, Cuban scouting pioneer
- Miguel Bonachea (born 1960), Cuban guitarist and professor
