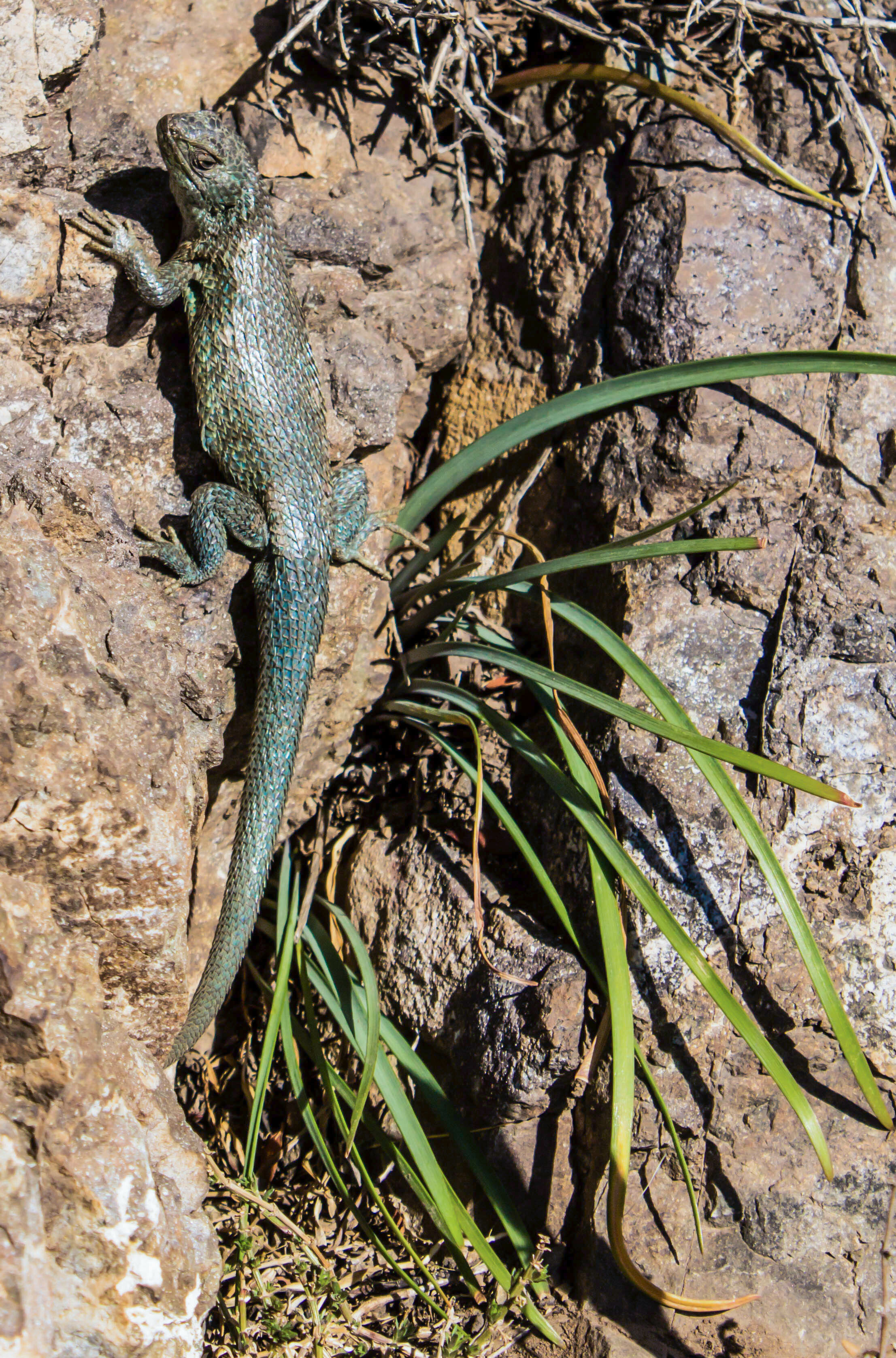

Conservation status
- Least Concern (IUCN 3.1)

Scientific classification
- Kingdom: Animalia
- Phylum: Chordata
- Class: Reptilia
- Order: Squamata
- Suborder: Iguania
- Family: Liolaemidae
- Genus: Liolaemus
- Species: L. cristiani

Binomial name
- Liolaemus cristiani Navarro, Núñez & Loyola, 1991

= Liolaemus cristiani =

Species of lizard

Liolaemus cristiani is a species of lizard in the family Liolaemidae. The species is native to Chile.

== Etymology ==
The specific name, cristiani, is in honor of Cristián Navarro, son of José Navarro.

== Geographic range ==
L. cristiani is endemic to Maule Region, Chile.

== Habitat ==
The preferred natural habitat of L. cristiani is rocky areas of shrubland, at altitudes of 2,300–2,460 m (7,550–8,070 ft).

== Diet ==
L. cristiani is omnivorous, preying upon insects and eating plant material.

== Reproduction ==
L. cristiani is viviparous.

== Taxonomy ==
L. cristiani is a member of the neuquensis species group of Liolaemus.
