= Carlos Molina =

Carlos Molina may refer to:

- Carlos Molina (American boxer) (born 1985), American light welterweight boxer
- Carlos Molina (Mexican boxer) (born 1983), Mexican light middleweight boxer
- Carlos Molina (guitarist) (born 1946), Cuban guitarist and professor
- Carlos Molina (politician) (born 1974), Puerto Rican politician
- Carlos Molina (footballer), Chilean footballer
- Carlos Rodríguez Molina (born 1988), Spanish footballer
