= Julio Roloff =

Cuban composer (born 1951)

Julio Roloff (born 1951 in Havana) is a Cuban composer that has collaborated with the Laboratorio Nacional de Música Electroacústica (LNME) founded by composer Juan Blanco, where he created numerous electroacoustic pieces.

== Studies ==
Julio Roloff studied double bass and music theory at the Amadeo Roldán and Ignacio Cervantes Conservatories. He also studied musical composition with Roberto Valera and Carlos Fariñas at the Instituto Superior de Arte (ISA).

== Performer ==
Roloff worked as a double bassist in several orchestras and as a musical adviser at EGREM records.

== Composer ==
In the 1980s a group of composers that included Julio Roloff, started receiving instruction and working at the ICAP Electroacoustic Studio in Havana, Cuba. The works of Julio Roloff have been performed by soloists such as Cuban guitarist Carlos Molina and Czech percussionist Tomás Koubek, as well as various instrumental ensembles, in concerts and Festivals such as the International Electroacoustic Music Festival "Primavera en Varadero", celebrated in Varadero Beach, Cuba, the Festivales Latinoamericanos de Música and the Subtropics Festival, in Miami, Florida.

Since 1993, Julio Roloff established his residence in the US, where he has closely collaborated with the South Florida Composers Alliance, directed by Venezuelan composer Gustavo Matamoros.

== See also ==
Music of Cuba
