= Carlos Malcolm (composer) =

Cuban composer and pianist

Carlos Malcolm (born 1945 in Guanabacoa, Cuba) is a Cuban composer and pianist.

== Academic training ==
Carlos Malcolm began his musical education with professors Juana María Quiñones and Sonia Montalvo. In 1962, he went to the National Art Schools (Cuba), where he studied with Alicia Perea Maza (piano) and Federico Smith (composition). At a later time he continued his training at the Amadeo Roldán Conservatory with professors Margot Rojas (piano) and Carmen Valdés (music theory). He concluded his studies at the Instituto Superior de Arte in Havana, Cuba.

Since 1990, Malcolm lives in Poland, where he has studied at the Frédéric Chopin Music University.

== Professional activity ==
Since he was 16 years old, Malcolm participated as a pianist in diverse musical ensembles. He has composed incidental music for theater, dance, cinema and radio events.

Malcolm worked as pianist and composer for the Cuban Institute of Radio and Television (ICRT). In 1980, he collaborated with a dance ensemble in Ecuador, for which he created the piece titled "Eclosión", which was premiered at Quito during that same year. Also in Ecuador, Malcolm gave contemporary harmony and musical composition courses.

Carlos Malcolm toured through different countries, such as Mexico (1979-1981), Jamaica (1980), and Canada (1986), where he interpreted his own works. In 1985, Malcolm participated in the Warsaw Autumn festival in Poland, where his played his piece titled "Quetzalcóatl", for flute and piano. While he stayed in Warsaw during years 1987, 1988 and 1989, he met the famous composer Iannis Xenakis, who exerted a great influence in his style. Malcolm has utilized diverse contemporary music techniques, such as aleatorism in his Studies for piano (1963) and his Adagio for four hands (1974), as well as dodecaphonism and serialism in Articulaciones (1970).

Carlos Malcolm is a member of the Polish Composers' Union.

== Works ==
Band

- Montaje, 1969. Conjunto instrumental.
- Allegro en son, para quinteto de viento, y Dúo, para flauta y clarinete, 1964.
- Canción intermezzo, para coro y conjunto de guitarra, 1965.
- Lo que puede ocurrir en dos pulsaciones, 1969, para cello y piano.
- Una flor que se abre, 1972, para clarinete y piano.
- Sones de guerra, 1973, para guitarra y piano.
- Diálogo I, 1975, para dos percusionistas y tres pianos.
- Sonata, 1977, para dos pianos.
- Canto con interrupciones, para cello y piano, yEn broma y en serio, para violín, cello y piano, 1978; *Rondas para un nuevo son, para saxofón alto y piano yQuetzalcóatl (Canto de la serpiente emplumada), 1983.
- Lo uno y lo vario, para violín y piano, Oposiciones cambios, para tres percusionistas, yRumores, para violín, cello y piano, 1984.

Choir

- Un verso me piden, 1971, para coro, solista y conjunto instrumental
- Música para la escena
- Eclosión, 1979, música incidental para danza
- Orquesta sinfónica
- Marionetas, 1964.
- Contorno, 1971.
- Movimiento sinfónico para flauta obligada, 1980

Piano

- Estudios, 1963.
- Articulaciones, 1970.
- Adagio para cuatro manos, 1974.
- El remediano, 1978.

Piano and orchestra

Concierto, 1981.

Voice and instrumental ensemble

Tonos de orquesta, 1968.

Voice and piano

- Dos canciones, 1976, texto: Rubén Martínez Villena.
- Balada del güije, Coplas de Juan el Barbero, 1979.
- Abrazo.
- Matábara del hombre malo.
- Un son para niños.
- Antillanos, 1980.
- Spring in New Hampshire.
- TheTropics in New York, 1981.

== Recognitions ==
Carlos Malcolm has received several recognitions for his work in Cuba.

== See also ==
- Music of Cuba
