= Christian Lavernier =

Italian guitarist and composer

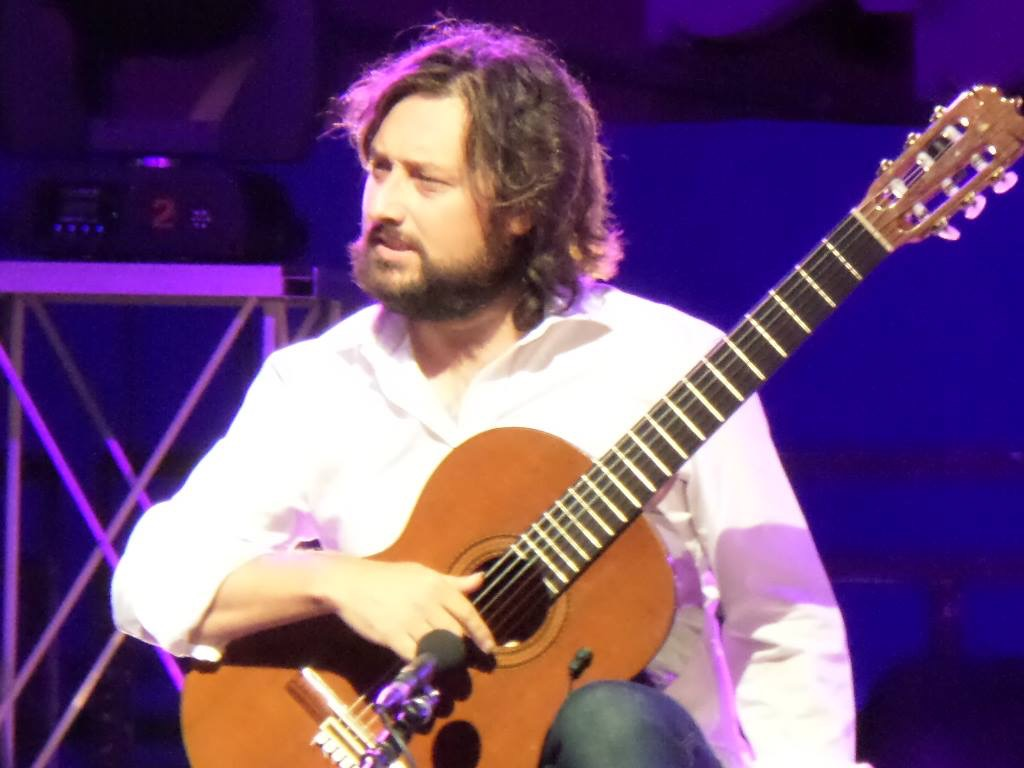
- Christian Lavernier in concerto.jpg

Background information
- Born: Christian Lavernier; Imperia, Italy
- Genres: Classic
- Occupation: Musician
- Instrument: Guitar
- Website: www.christianlavernier.com

Christian Lavernier is an Italian guitarist and composer.

== Biography ==
Christian Lavernier is an Italian guitarist and composer. He attended Giuseppe Verdi Conservatory in Milan. Later, he studied the contemporary repertoire with Angelo Gilardino and Leo Brouwer. In 2010 he started to work on his compositions and in 2016 Sinfonica Edition published his first three pieces for guitar. In 2010 he began his international career and since then, he has been performing throughout the world and has made regular appearances on radio (Spain, England, Argentina, France, Venezuela, Russia, Japan, United States, Mexico and Italy.) In 2016 he moved permanently to Paris where he is currently living.

== Career ==
In 2017, Lavernier first met the actor Ugo Dighero with whom he began a collaboration for the show "Platero y Yo" by Juan Ramon Jimenez and music by Mario Castelnuovo-Tedesco. The following year, master luthier Carlos Gonzalez Marcos created La Soñada (a new eleven-strings guitar) for contemporary music and he gave it to Christian Lavernier. With this new instrument he begins work on the Contemporary Future project. The project involves some great Italian and international composers (Azio Corghi, Angelo Gilardino, Andrea Talmelli, Flores Chaviano, Leo Brouwer, Alberto Colla, Nicola Campogrande). Also in 2018, Christian Lavernier together with Nicola Campogrande began working on a new publication of the "12 Inkjet Preludes" rethought for "La Soñada" and published by Universal Music – Ricordi, with the editing and fingering by Christian Lavernier. In 2019, he released the album Contemporary Future (EMA Vinci) with the first unpublished works for the eleven-strings instrument. Ennio Morricone and Azio Corghi sign the prefaces of this album. The SIMC (Società Italiana Musica Contemporanea) and CIDIM have lent their patronage. The SIAE included it in the series "I classici di oggi". Universal Music – Ricordi published the score of the opera "Redobles y Consonancias" by A. Corghi for Soñada. The editing and fingering were entrusted to Lavernier himself. The first performance of "Redobles y Consonancias" took place in spring 2019 at Palazzo Té, Mantua, in the presence of the composer. In 2021 EMA Vinci released the album "Aria" which includes ten unpublished compositions for eleven-strings instrument written by Lavernier.

== Honours and awards ==
- 2009 – Award XVII International Festival, Burgos (Spagna)
- 2011 – Award XVII International Festival, Burgos (Spagna)
- 2012 – Award XXII International Guitar Festival Morelia, Tepalcatepec (Messico)
- 2013 – Award University CUI Ixtlahuaca, International Guitar Festival Ixtlahuaca (Messico)
- 2014 – Award International Festival Angostura, (Venezuela)
- 2018 – Award "Imperia City 2018"

== Publications ==
- Nicola Campogrande "12 Ink-Jet" for Eleven Strings Guitar ", editing and fingering by Christian Lavernier (Universal Music – Ricordi)
- Azio Corghi "Redobles y Consonancias" for Eleven Strings Guitar, editing and fingering by Christian Lavernier (Universal Music – Ricordi)
- Christian Lavernier "Tres Almas" (Sinfonica Editions)
- Six Studies for Guitar (EMA Edition)
- Deepawali for Harp and Guitar (EMA Edition)
- Helgoland for Eleven Strings Guitar (EMA Edition)
- Humuamua for Theremin and Guitar (EMA Edition)
- Light Side for Eleven Strings Guitar (EMA Edition)

== Discography ==
- 2013: Christian Lavernier
- 2016: Tres Almas (Edizioni Sinfonica)
- 2019: Nicola Campogrande "12 Preludi a Getto d' Inchiostro"
- 2019: Contemporary Future (EMA Records)
- 2021: Aria (EMA Records)
- 2021: Travel (EMA Records)
