= Gustavo Matamoros =

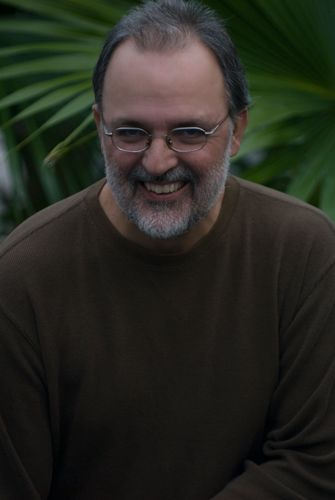
- Gustavo Matamoros, composer-sound artist

Background information
- Born: 1957 (age 68–69)
- Origin: Caracas, Venezuela
- Genres: experimental music, sound art
- Occupations: Composer, Sound Artist, Professor
- Instrument: musical saw
- Website: subtropics.org/gustavomatamoros

Gustavo Matamoros (b. Caracas, 1957) is a Venezuelan composer, interdisciplinary artist, community organizer and educator who has established his residence in Miami, Florida, US, since 1979.

== Biography ==
Gustavo Matamoros studied at the University of Miami from 1979 to 1983. He has taught critical and creative listening at the Design and Architecture Senior High School (DASH) and at the Miami International University of Art and Design. Matamoros has also offered periodical lectures about his work with sound.

== Cultural organizations ==
In 1985, Gustavo Matamoros was one of the founders of the South Florida Composers Alliance, a Miami-based organization. Some year later he also participated in the foundation of the Subtropics Experimental Music and Sound Arts Festival, which was created (according to art critic Lysa Oberkreser) “in order to expose Miami to a new music and the fine art of sound.” Since their inception, Matamoros has been the artistic director of both the SFCA Subtropics Festival and the Interdisciplinary Sound Arts Workshop (iSaw). During the 1990s Gustavo Matamoros also co-founded PUNTO Experimental Music Ensemble together with Cuban composer Armando Rodriguez Ruidiaz.

== Work ==
Gustavo Matamoros catalog of compositions includes numerous pieces for solo electroacoustic media or electroacoustics combined with traditional instruments. It also includes a wide variety of works based on contemporary and experimental techniques such as mixed media, installations, sound portraits, radiophony, text and video. He has composed a series of “Retratos” (Portraits) based on sound materials produced by the subjects portrayed on the pieces. Venezuelan composers Marianela Arocha and Adina Izarra have referred to those pieces as follows: “From the 90’s onward many forms of mix repertoire are present, also more research and improvising can be seen among the (Venezuelan) composers. Like in Gustavo Matamoros “Retratos” where each performer chooses its own material which the composer transforms on tape and sets for the interaction in concert. The composer himself speaks of gesture and morphology: all sounds are possible and allowed; all of them make sense within different contexts”. Some of the subjects for those “Portraits” are: guitarist and composer Flores Chaviano, oboist and composer Joseph Celli, poet Bob Gregory, double-bassist Luis Gómez Imbert and composer Ricardo Dal Farra.

Gustavo Matamoros has studied and explored the sound characteristics of an uncommon musical instrument, the musical saw. He has composed many pieces based on the utilization of this instrument and has also utilized other instruments of his own creation on his pieces. Matamoros organized a musical saw quartet called SEE that included the following performers: Ryan Agnew, Ulrike Heydenreich and Stephanie Lie. They offered their first performance during an ACA residency with Robert Ashley at Smyrna Beach.

Gustavo Matamoro’s music has been presented at numerous cultural events in the US, Latin America and Europe. He has co-directed the WORD(S) SOUND Festival in São Paulo, Brazil and is the producer of FISHTANK a radio journal of new and experimental music broadcast by WLRN in Miami. In 2008 Matamoros and sound artist Rene Barge presented "two chambers divided by an opening" at the Dorsch Gallery in Wynwood, the show consisted of an empty gallery and viewers experienced the specially tuned sound work within the space. He has collaborated with a long list of prominent artists such as: Davey and Jan Williams, Fred Longberg-Holm, Dinorah Rodríguez, Helena Thevenot, Lou Mallozzi, Charles Recher, David Manson, Shahreyar Ataie, Jacqueline Humbert, Malcolm Goldstein, Russell Frehling, Alison Knowles, David Dunn and Rene Barge.

== Grants, commissions and awards ==
Gustavo Matamoros received two Musical Composition National Prizes in his native country, Venezuela. In the US, he has received multiple grants and commissions from art, music, media, visual and theater organizations, as well as government organizations such as the Florida’s Art in State Buildings and the Florida Consortium's 2000-Visual and Media Arts Fellowship.

== See also ==
- Music of Venezuela
- The Hexagonal Galleries
