= Juan Antonio Mercadal =

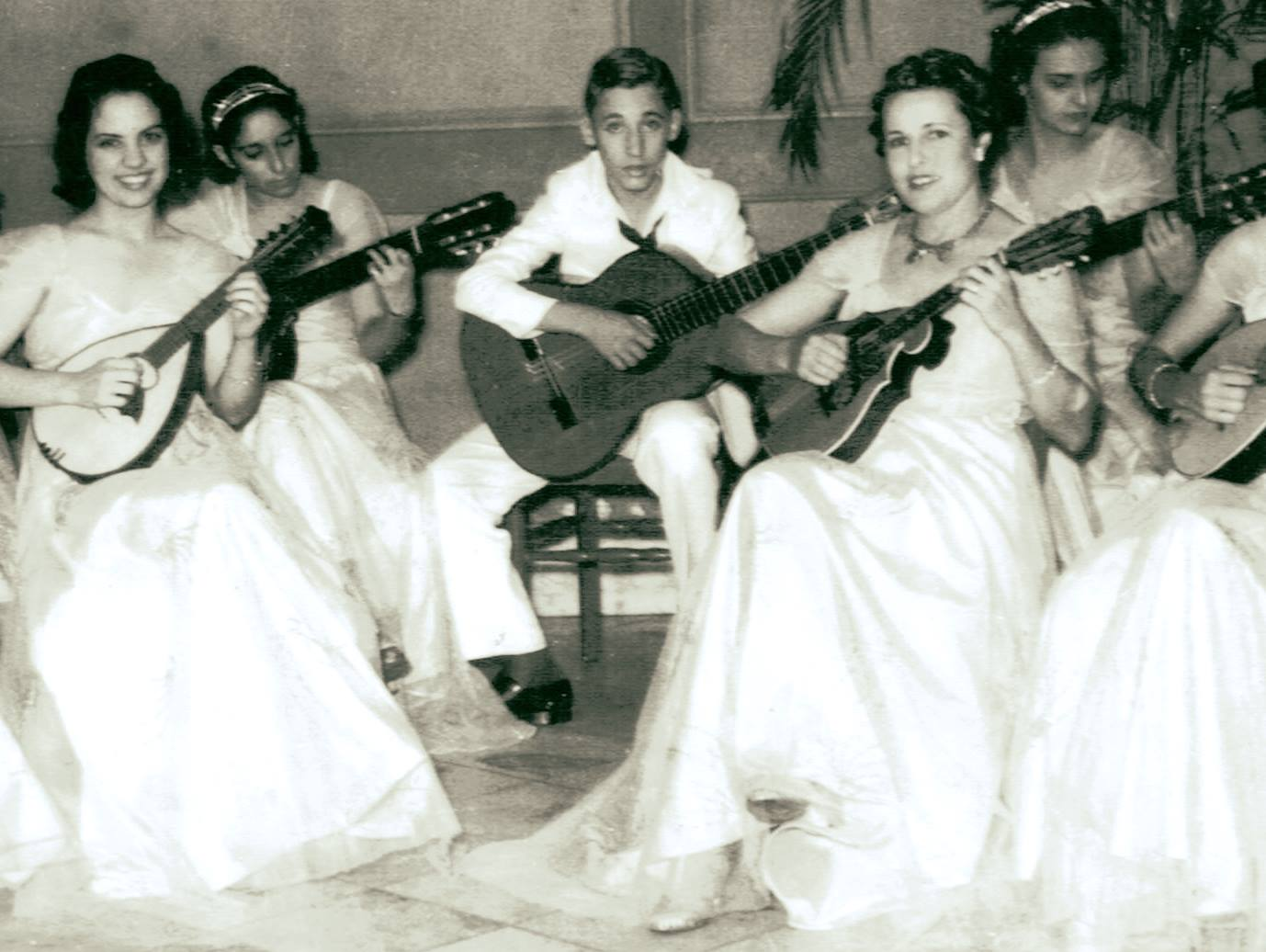
Cuban guitarist Juan Antonio Mercadal playing in a group at a young age.

Juan Antonio Mercadal (February 12, 1925, in Guanabacoa, Havana, Cuba – January 21, 1998, in Miami, United States) was a Cuban guitarist.

== Academic background ==
Juan Antonio Mercadal began to play the guitar at a very young age and received his first formal training from his own father, guitarist Juan Ramón Mercadal. At a later time, he continued studying with Maestro Severino López, professor of his father, and after graduating from High School at 16 in 1940, he became a professional concert performer and worked at the same time for Braniff Airways with the purpose of supplementing his income. Mercadal also studied clarinet and french horn at Conservatorio Mateu in Guanabacoa, and participated as a French horn player in the concerts of the Havana Symphony Orchestra.

== Career ==
On April 27, 1940, Juan Antonio Mercadal participated in the inauguration concert of the Guitar Society of Cuba, founded by professor Clara Romero de Nicola where he played the "Fandanguillo" from Joaquín Turina and the "Variations on a Theme" by Wolfgang Amadeus Mozart from Fernando Sor. On July 31 he performed a program at the same institution that included the "Courante and Gavota" by Johann Sebastian Bach and the Fernando Sor Variations. Between years 1942 and 1943, Juan Antonio Mercadal offered concerts in the Hispanic-Cuban Cultural Institution (Institución Hispano-Cubana de Cultura) where he performed programs including pieces that comprised the most important styles from the 18th to the 20th Centuries. In 1944 he presented at Club Atenas a program that included pieces by Haendel, Bach, Beethoven, Tárrrega, Albéniz, Moreno Torroba, Turina, Sor, Mozart and Chopin.

In 1944, Mercadal offered a weekly program at Radio Station CMBZ which belonged to the Education Ministry, where he shared time with Cuban pianist Alberto Bolet. At the same time, he worked as a professor of guitar in the Alfredo Levy Conservatory and the Methodist School of Havana.

Juan Antonio Mercadal worked on numerous transcriptions of pieces for the guitar that included the "Sarabande" by George Frideric Haendel, "Orgía" by Joaquín Turina, "Rondino" by Fritz Kreisler and "Aires Bohemios" from Pablo Sarasate, among others.

During his first trip outside Cuba in 1951, Juan Mercadal paid a visit to composer Heitor Villa-Lobos in Brazil, which gave him the scores of his Twelve Studies for Guitar and his Concert for Guitar and Orchestra to play. At that time he also had the opportunity to visit composer and pianist Radamés Gnatalli, who dedicated his "Concert for Guitar and Orchestra" to him.

After returning to Cuba in 1954, he performed the music of the Cuban film "Casta de Robles", from composer and conductor Félix Guerrero and participated in several TV shows.

In 1960, Juan Antonio Mercadal established his residence, together with his family, in Miami, Florida, United States, and in 1962 he founded one of the first classical guitar programs in an important university within the US, the University of Miami.

During the last years of his life, Mercadal offered approximately ten concerts per year and recorded an album of pieces for the guitar that was released after his death in 1998. After his passing, he left his wife, three kids, and nine grandchildren who are still living healthy lives.

== See also ==
- Music of Cuba
- Classical guitar in Cuba
