= Clara (Cuqui) Nicola =

Cuban guitarist and professor (1926–2017)

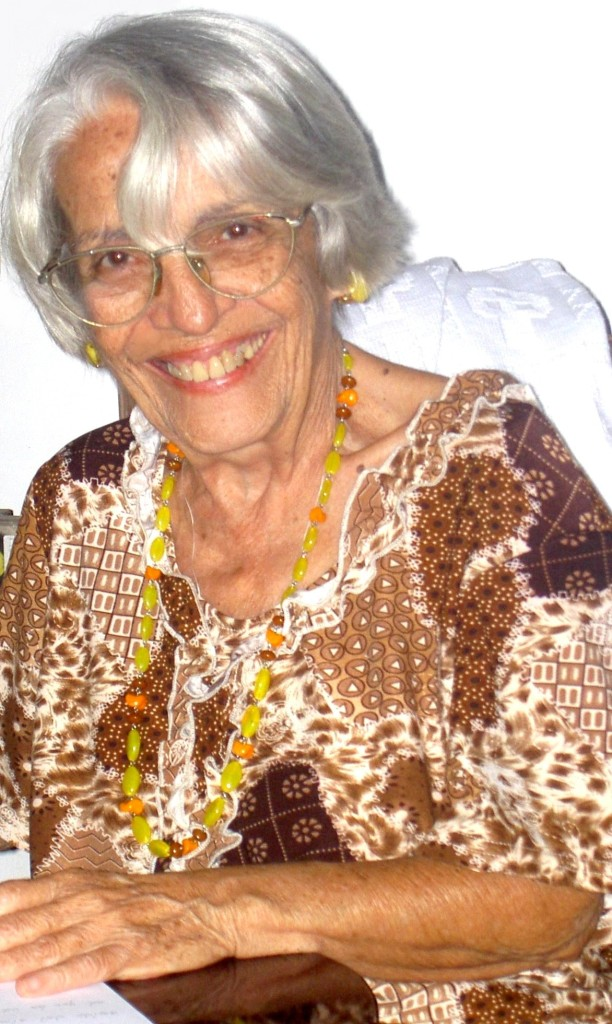
Clara (Cuqui) Nicola - Cuban guitarist and professor.

Clara (Cuqui) Nicola (22 March 1926 – 14 July 2017) was a prominent Cuban guitarist and professor.

== Academic background ==
Clara (Cuqui) Nicola studied guitar with her mother Clara Romero de Nicola, a renowned guitarist and founder of the modern Cuban Guitar School, and graduated at the Municipal Conservatory of Havana. She also participated under her mother's direction in the activities of the “Sociedad Infantil de Bellas Artes”, junior branch of the cultural organization “Pro-Arte Musical.”.

== Work ==
After the Cuban Revolution in 1959, Clara (Cuqui) Nicola collaborated with her brother Isaac Nicola and other guitarists and professors, such as Marta Cuervo, in the implementation of a unified method for all the music schools in Cuba. She made a valuable contribution to the development of a national pedagogic system for the guitar.

Cuqui Nicola worked as a professor at the Escuela Nacional de Instructores de Arte (ENIA). Among her many disciples were the Cuban jazz guitarist Carlos Emilio Morales, and composer Edesio Alejandro.

She worked also as adviser for TV programs such as “Aficionados en TV” from 1967 to 1968.

== Recognitions ==
“Cubadisco de Honor” Award in 2012

== Death ==
Cuqui Nicola died on July 14, 2017, after suffering a Cardiac arrest. She was 91. She died on the 20th anniversary of her brother Isaac Nicola's death.

== See also ==
- Classical Guitar in Cuba
- Music of Cuba
