= Rogelio Martínez Furé =

- Born: August 28, 1937; Matanzas, Cuba
- Died: October 10, 2022 (aged 85); Havana, Cuba
- Education: University of Havana
- Occupations: ethnologist, folklorist, writer
- Awards: National Prize for Literature (Cuba) (2015)

Rogelio Martínez Furé (August 28, 1937 Matanzas, Cuba - October 10, 2022, Havana, Cuba) was a Cuban writer, ethnologist, and folklorist. He was the founder of the National Cuban Folkloric Company (Conjunto Folkórico Nacional) and the 2015 winner of the National Prize for Literature (Cuba).

== Career ==
Martínez Furé studied and disseminated the origins of traditional Cuban music and African dances that were native to Cuba and other regions in the Americas. He was a major contributor to the founding of the National Cuban Folkloric Company, for which he was honored with a number of awards. He was the author of dozens of books, most notably Poesía anónima africana (1968), Diwan africano (1988) and Briznas de la memoria (2004), as well as articles and musical compositions.

== Awards ==
- Honorary Doctorate, Instituto Superior de Arte, Havana
- José White Provincial Music Award, granted by the Association of Musicians of the National Union of Writers and Artists of Cuba, en Matanzas.
- 2004 Fernando Ortiz International Prize
- 2001 National Prize for Cultural Research
- 2002 National Dance Award
- 2015 National Prize for Literature (Cuba)
