= Roger Aguilar Labrada =

Cuban artist (born 1947)

Roger Sebastián Aguilar Labrada
- Born: December 22, 1947 (age 78); Pilon, Granma, Cuba

Roger Sebastián Aguilar Labrada (born 1947 in Pilón, Granma, Cuba) is a Cuban artist specializing in graphic design, painting, drawing and engraving.

Aguilar studied in 1965 at the Escuela Nacional para Instructores de Artes Plásticas in Havana and the following year he became part of the seminary the Taller Experimental de Gráfica (TEG) in Havana, Cuba. Between 1977 and 1981, Aguilar was director of this institution and the Unión de Escritores y Artistas de Cuba (UNEAC).

== Individual exhibitions ==
Aguilar's personal exhibitions included these:

- 1980 – Calcografías de Roger Aguilar at the Museo Nacional de Bellas Artes de La Habana;
- 1989 – El Paraíso Perdido (The Lost Paradise) at the Museo de Arte Colonial in Old Havana;
- 1994 – Pinturas de Roger Aguilar Labrada at the Galería La Acacia in Havana, Cuba.

== Collective exhibitions ==
He also formed part of many collective exhibitions:

- 1968 – "Exposición de La Havana’68" at the Galería Latinoamericana in the Casa de las Américas, Havana, Cuba;
- 1970 – "IX Premi Internacional Dibuix Joan Miró", Collegi d’Arquitectes (College of Architects), Barcelona, Spain
- 1971 – "Cubaanse Affiches" at the Stedelijk Museum, Amsterdam, Netherlands.
- 1984 – "1a. Bienal de La Habana", Museo Nacional de Bellas Artes de La Habana
- 1997 at "Encuentro de Grabado’97", at the Centro de Desarrollo de las Artes Visuales(CDAV), Havana, Cuba.

== Awards ==
Aguilar has received many awards and recognitions:

- 1975 – Prize in Lithography in Salón Nacional de Grabados, Galería Amelia Peláez, Havana.
- 1984 – Honorable Mention, Salón de Artes Plásticas UNEAC, Museo Nacional de Bellas Artes de La Habana.
- 1985 – Honorable Mention, Salón de Artes Plásticas UNEAC, Museo Nacional de Bellas Artes de La Habana.

== Collections ==
His works can be found in the permanent collections of:

- Wolfang Schneider Contemporary Graphic Collection, in Germany;
- Collection of Engravings, at the Gallery of New Masters, in Dresden, Germany;
- Museo Matta in Milan, Italy;
- Museo Nacional de Bellas Artes de La Habana
- Taller Experimental de Gráfica (TEG) in Havana, Cuba.
