= Marta Cuervo =

Cuban guitarist and professor

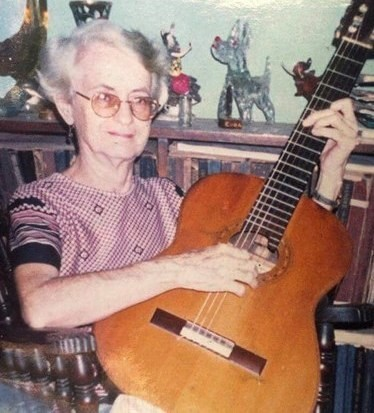
Marta Cuervo - Cuban guitarist and professor.

Marta Cuervo (b. Havana, Cuba) was a Cuban guitarist and professor.

== Academic formation ==
Marta Cuervo studied guitar and musical theory at the Havana Municipal Conservatory. She was a disciple of guitarist Isaac Nicola.

== Work ==
Marta Cuervo closely collaborated with Isaac Nicola and other guitarists such as Clara (Cuqui) Nicola, Marianela Bonet and Leopoldina Nuñez in the implementation of a unified method for all the music schools in Cuba, after de 1959 Revolution. She encouraged her own guitar students, such as Armando Rodriguez Ruidiaz, to compose and transcribe music for the instrument thus contributing to the development of a national pedagogic system and repertoire.

Among Marta Cuervo's many disciples we can mention guitarists Edel Muñoz, Joaquín Clerch, Aldo Rodríguez, Sergio García Marruz and Fernando Mariña (Mexican guitarist that studied in Cuba between 1986 and 1997), among others.

== See also ==
- Classical Guitar in Cuba
- Music of Cuba
