= Nicola Campogrande =

Italian composer and journalist

Nicola Campogrande (born 9 October 1969 in Turin) is an Italian composer. His music is published exclusively by Breitkopf & Härtel. He's also active as music journalist, writing for the newspaper Corriere della Sera, and as radio host for RAI Radio3.

He published several popular books about music.

== Selected works ==
=== Stage ===
- Il ventre del mare, words by Alessandro Baricco (1994)
- Macchinario, words by Dario Voltolini (1995)
- Capelas imperfeitas, words by Dario Voltolini (1997)
- Cronache animali, on lyrics by Toti Scialoja (1998)
- Quando piovvero cappelli a Milano, words by Gianni Rodari (from Tante storie per giocare) (2000)
- Lego, words by Dario Voltolini (2000)
- Alianti, words by Dario Voltolini (2001)
- Tempi burrascosi, words by Dario Voltolini (2009)
- Opera italiana, libretto by Elio and Piero Bodrato (2010)
- De bello gallico, libretto by Piero Bodrato (2016)
- Folon, libretto by Piero Bodrato (2017)
- La notte di San Nicola, libretto by Piero Bodrato (2020)
- I due usignoli, libretto by Piero Bodrato (2023)

=== Orchestral (with and without soloists) ===
- Concerto per pianoforte e orchestra (2002) from the Concerto per cembalo e archi BWV 1052 (Bach)
- Sinfonietta (2004)
- Absolut – Concert for cello, bass and string orchestra (2004)
- Tre piccolissime musiche notturne (2006)
- Alta tensione – for electric violin and string orchestra (2006)
- Soffio blu – Concert for flute and string orchestra (2006)
- Warm trip – Concert for cello and string orchestra (2007)
- Absolut new version – Concert for cello, bass and orchestra (2007)
- Paganini, Paganini! Concert for violino and orchestra (2011)
- Urban Gardens Concert for piano and orchestra (2012)
- R (un ritratto per pianoforte e orchestra) Concert for piano and orchestra (2012)
- Banksy Promenade for orchestra (2013)
- Magia nera for orchestra (2013)
- The Expo Variations for orchestra (2014-2015)
- Concerto for audience and orchestra (2015)
- Divertimento (2016)
- Le felicità, for soprano, choir and orchestra (2018)
- Le sette mogli di Barbablù for actor and orchestra (2018)
- Sinfonia n. 1 (2019-2021)
- Cinque modi per aprire un concerto (2021)
- Sinfonia n. 2 (2022)
- Decisamente allegro (2022)
- Concerto per violino e orchestra (2022)
- Quattro modi di sorridere, for string orchestra (2023)
- Concerto per violino, corno, pianoforte e orchestra (2024)
- Liberi tutti, per quartetto d'archi e orchestra (2024)

=== Chamber music ===
- La voce delle nuvole che non-ci sono più for bass clarinet and voice (1992)
- Torino, una sigla for flute, violin and cello (1993)
- Tutto il mondo for violin, cello and piano (1994)
- Macchina per aspettare che sia pronto il the for four instruments (1995)
- Arrivano i nostri for violin, cello and piano (1998)
- Tililadodin for harp and piano (2000)
- Blu tranquillo, for eight instruments (2002)
- Danze del riso e dell'oblio for accordion and piano (2004)
- Esterno di edificio for string quintet (2 violins, viola, cello, double bass) (2005)
- Follie for 2 violins, theorbo, cello and harpsichord (2005)
- Effetto Kreutzer for violin and piano (2007)
- Danze della signorina Olivia for violin and piano (2008)
- Danza delle mele azzurre for bassoon and cello (2009)
- Istruzioni per il cielo for clarinet, viola and piano (2010)
- Rimedi per l'anima string quartet (2011)
- 150 decibel for cello and piano / viola and piano / 3 pianos (2015)
- Paganini, Paganini! for violin and piano (2011-2019)
- Divertimento for strings (2019)
- Forme di felicità for violin and piano (2020)
- Danze immaginarie for baroque trio, classical trio and electric bass (2021)
- Musica trasparente, for string quartet (2024)

=== Choral and vocal music ===
- Dipingendo for baritone and tea-box (1995)
- La testa del chiodo for boys' chorus, words by Gianni Rodari (1996)
- Hölderlied for soprano and ensemble (1996)
- Canto dell'animale senza nome for voice and piano, words by Dario Voltolini (2000)
- Il mare è un grande latte for boys' chorus, words by Dario Voltolini (2002)
- Agnus Dei for mixed chorus (2011)

=== Solo instruments ===
- Modicomò for flute (1993)
- Il Finale, for piano (1994)
- Passa di qui for clarinet (1997)
- Tichitachitac for marimba and hi-hat (1997)
- Preludi a getto d'inchiostro for guitar (2001–2003)
- Bach Werke Variation for piano (2003)
- La dolce Italia for piano (2003)
- Progetto per una notte di stelle for harp (2006)
- Momento musicale for piano (2007)
- Ludwig van Gotlibovich for viola (2011)
- Nudo for piano (2015)
- 12 Preludi a getto d'inchiostro for 11 Stings Guitar - revision of Christian Lavernier (2018)
- Preludi da viaggio for piano (2021)

=== Exhibitions and incidental music ===
- Modigliani per la mostra "Modigliani. L'angelo dal volto severo". Milan, Palazzo Reale, 2003
- Africa, capolavori da un continente per la mostra omonima. Turin, Galleria d'arte moderna, 2003–2004
- Il nome della rosa (2005) commissioned by Rai Radio Due, radiophonic version directed by Giuseppe Venetucci
- Giovanna d'Arco (1998) commissioned by Teatro Stabile of Turin
- Antenati (1997) commissioned by Teatro Settimo
- I corvi (1997) commissioned by Rai Radio Tre – "Teatri alla radio" project
- Dal matrimonio al divorzio (1996) commissioned by Teatro Stabile of Turin
- Una pallida felicità (1995) commissioned by Teatro Stabile of Turin

== Discography ==
- La voce delle nuvole che non-ci sono più, DDT (1992)
- Mosorrofa, o dell'ottimismo (su testi di Dario Voltolini), DDT (1993)
- Il finale, DDT (1994)
- Capelas imperfeitas – Diciotto canzoni senza tetto su testi di Dario Voltolini, DDT (1997)
- Cronache animali – Pocket opera per attrice che canta e cinque strumenti su testi di Toti Scialoja, DDT (1998)
- Africa. Capolavori da un continente, DDT (2004)
- Danze del riso e dell'oblio, Stradivarius (2005)
- Tango del vento? e Bossa del vento? in Luz, VELUT LUNA (2005)
- Progetto per una notte di stelle, VELUT LUNA (2006)
- Preludi a getto d'inchiostro, VELUT LUNA (2006)
- Skin, ACME (2007)
- Promenade des petites notes, Stradivarius (2007)
- Melodie per preparare la carta, VELUT LUNA (2007)
- Valzer (original soundtrack), CAM (2007)
- La voce delle nuvole che non-ci sono più, BA (2007)
- Musica per Sebastiano del Piombo, HUKAPAN (2008)
- Musica per Palladio, HUKAPAN (2008)
- Just married, OFT LIVE (2008)
- Tililadodin, DECCA (2008)
- Campogrande in jazz, DDT (2009)
- Danze della signorina Olivia, DDT (2010)
- Tutto il mondo, NUOVA ERA
- Passa di qui, DATUM
- La testa del chiodo, PCT
- Tango, MARRERO
- Hauptstimmen, CONTINUO RECORDS (2016)
- Nudo, DDT (2020)
- Materna, BRILLIANT (2018)
- Amore, GENUIN (2019)
- Preludi a getto d'inchiostro, DDT (2020)
- Preludi a getto d'inchiostro, DA VINCI (2020)
