= Efraín Amador =

Cuban guitarist (born 1947)

Efraín Amador Piñero (born 1947) is a Cuban guitarist, lutist, composer and professor. He has conducted extensive investigations about the “Cuban lute” and “tres” performance styles, and has created several methods of study and numerous compositions for those instruments.

== Studies ==
Amador began studying guitar at Havana Municipal Conservatory (Amadeo Roldán) with renowned professor Isaac Nicola and graduated in 1970. At a later time he studied guitar at the Instituto Superior de Arte with professors Nicola and Leo Brouwer, as well as musical composition with José Ardévol, Roberto Valera and José Loyola. In 1981 he received a Doctorate Degree from the Instituto Superior de Arte. He also received post-graduate instruction from distinguished guitarist such as Alirio Díaz and Antonio Lauro.

== Work ==
Efraín Amador is credited for having achieved the inclusion of the Cuban “lute” and “tres” performance techniques in the academic programs of art schools in Cuba. He has closely collaborated with his wife Doris Oropesa in numerous performances> and has served for many years as a professor at the Instituto Superior de Arte (ISA).

During the year 2012, Efraín Amador visited the United States, where he was invited to participate at the Grand Ole Opry in Nashville, Tennessee. In San Francisco he was received by renowned guitarist David Tanenbaum, who hosted Amador's two hours lecture concert, where he exposed the characteristics and principles of the “Cuban School of tres and laud”. At the same city, Amador participated in a TV and radio broadcast, and ended his tour in Oregon, where he played at the Oswego County and at the Hispanic Art and Culture Festival in Portland. During that trip, Efraín Amador also recorded a CD at a Studio in Los Angeles, California.

== Musical compositions ==
Amador's ample catalog of compositions include:

Choir

- Oye pionerito, coro infantil
- Pobre niño siboney, coro infantil
- En un rincón de Viet Nam, coro infantil, 1968
- Canción del siglo, coro mixto
- He recorrido, coro infantil; 1969
- Un río es un niño, 1973, coro infantil

Choir and orchestra

- Tríptico, 1978

Guitar

- Cuatro comentarios sobre Leo Brouwer, 1970
- Suite para un cacique, 1972
- Invención núms. 1-5
- Contrapuntos cubanos y Guajira, 1975
- Estudio para la mano izquierda, 1976
- Dos estudios con el dedo quinto y Preludio con tumbao, 1976
- Differencias sobre tres temas cubanos, 1977
- Fantasía del son, Fantasía y Son de la mano diestra, 1981
- Preludio espirituano núms. I y II, 1987
- Estudio en Mi menor, 1988

Guitar and piano

- Canto latinoamericano

Lute

- Escuela del laúd campesino, 1983-1986
- Son para un amigo, 1985
- Cuatro preludios, 1995-1996
- Concierto, para laúd y orquesta de guitarra, 1988-1989

Lute and piano

- Fantasía guajira, laúd, guitarra y piano, 1983-1984
- Suite campesina núm. 1, 1984-1985
- De lo real maravilloso (Homenaje a José Manuel Rodríguez), 1986-1987

Tres

- Escuela del tres cubano, 1986
- Regreso a mi tres, 1986
- Rondó campesino, 1986
- Primavera en Estocolmo, 1991
- Variaciones sobre aires sureños, 1992
- Estudio en estilo barroco, 1998

Tres and piano

- Guanabaquiste, 1986
- Variaciones para amanecer, 1998
- Tres and orchestra
- Concierto, tres y orquesta sinfónica, 1987-1988
- Concierto para amanecer, orquesta de guitarra, 1991
- Violin and piano
- Sonata amanecer, 1986
- Voice and guitar
- Al final del año de la alegría, Traza prodigios
- Tarde es para el árbol
- Tal vez una canción de amor
- Y las palabras, textos: Alex Fleites, 1979-1980
- Celia, 1980, texto: Efraín Amador
- Poema para dos, texto: Alex Fleites
- Días de Etiopía, texto: Nelson Herrera Ysla, 1981

Voice and piano

- Para la palma una nave, 1976

== See also ==
Music of Cuba
