= José Loyola =

Cuban composer, professor and flutist

José Eulalio Loyola Fernández (born 1941) is a Cuban composer, professor and flutist.

== Academic background ==
José Loyola was born in 1941 in Cienfuegos, Cuba. He began to study flute with his father, Efrain Loyola, and continued at a later time, in 1963, at the National Art Schools with professors Juan Pablo Ondina and Emigdio Mayo. In 1967, Loyola concluded his médium level music studies and received instruction from renowned North American professor Federico Smith.

In 1967, Loyola received a scholarship to study musical composition at the Warsaw Superior School of Music, with professors Grażyna Bacewicz, Andrzej Dobrowolski and Witold Rudzinski. In 1973, he concluded his studies. From 1981 to 1985, he continued at the Frédéric Chopin Academy at Warsaw, where he received a Doctorate in Music.

== Professional activity ==
José Loyola began his artistic career as a flutist in the orchestra of his father, Efraín Loyola, and at that time he made arrangements for other famous musical groups such as the Elio Revé, Pancho el Bravo and "Modelo" orchestras.

Loyola worked as professor of composition and orchestration, as well as a member of the "Commission of Scientific Degrees" at the Instituto Superior de Arte (La Habana). He also collaborated with the Music Sections of the Brigada Hermanos Saiz and the National Union of Writers and Artists of Cuba (UNEAC), and participated as a juror in the UNEAC composition contests of 1975 and 1976.

In Poland, José Loyola worked as a flutist and arranger for the Quartet of Polish pianist Frederyk Babinski, with which he participated in the festivals "Jazz Jamboree", from Warsaw, and "Jazz from Oder", in the city of Wrocław as well as in the Komeda Festival. With the Babinsky Quartet, Loyola participated in recording the sound track of several Polish films.

Loyola actively participated in numerous international cultural events, such as the Simposium about Opera, Ballet and Musical Theatre in Sofia, Bulgaria, in 1976; the Colloquium about Black Civilization and Education in Lagos, Nigeria, in 1977; the Gathering of Music directors and composers from the Socialist Countries in Moscow, Russia, in 1977; the International Collocquium about Music in Buenos Aires, Argentina, in 1988; the International Collocquium about the Bambuco in Mexico, in 1990; the International Collocquium about the Bolero in Venezuela, 1994 and 1995. In 1987, he founded the "Golden Boleros" Festival organized by the National Union of Writers and Artists of Cuba (UNEAC).

Most recently, José Loyola has created the "Charanga de Oro", a musical ensemble which structure is based in the classical format of the "Charanga francesa", which emerged during the first years of the 20th century derived from the "Orquesta típica", or wind ensemble.

== Awards and recognitions ==
- Annual Award for the totality of his work (1992)
- "Juan Marinello" Order (1996)
- "Alejo Carpentier" Medal,(2002)
- National Prize for Artistic Education (2023)

== Works ==
Piano

- Tres piezas cubanas. For percussion.
- Música viva núm. 1.

Chamber music

- Construcción, Ensamblaje, for brass ensemble
- Música, for flute and strings, 1970
- Música viva núm. 4, for chamber orchestra
- Música de cámara, 1975; Pas de deux, for flute and oboe
- Sinfonietta, for string orchestra, wind quintet and piano
- Trío, for oboe, clarinet and bassoon

Instrumental ensemble

- Canción del soy todo II, text: Eloy Machado, for oboe, narrator and Afro-Cuban percussion
- Canto negro, text: Nicolás Guillén, for baritone, mixed choir, piano and percussion
- Homenaje a Brindis de Salas, for violin solo
- Música viva núm. 3, for flute and Afro-Cuban percussion
- Poética del Guerrillero, text: Carlos Pellicer, for trumpet, choir and string orchestra
- Tres imágenes poéticas, for baritone, piano and percussion instruments

Symphony Orchestra

- Música viva núm. 2
- Música viva núm. 3
- Textura sonora, 1979
- Tropicalia

Choir

- Antipoemas, text: Nicanor Parra
- Cinco poemas, for mixed choir
- Variaciones folklóricas, for baritone, choir, piano and percussion

Opera

- Monzón y el rey de Koré, 1973, based on an African story

== See also ==
- Music of Cuba
