= Charles Recher =

American installation artist and filmmaker

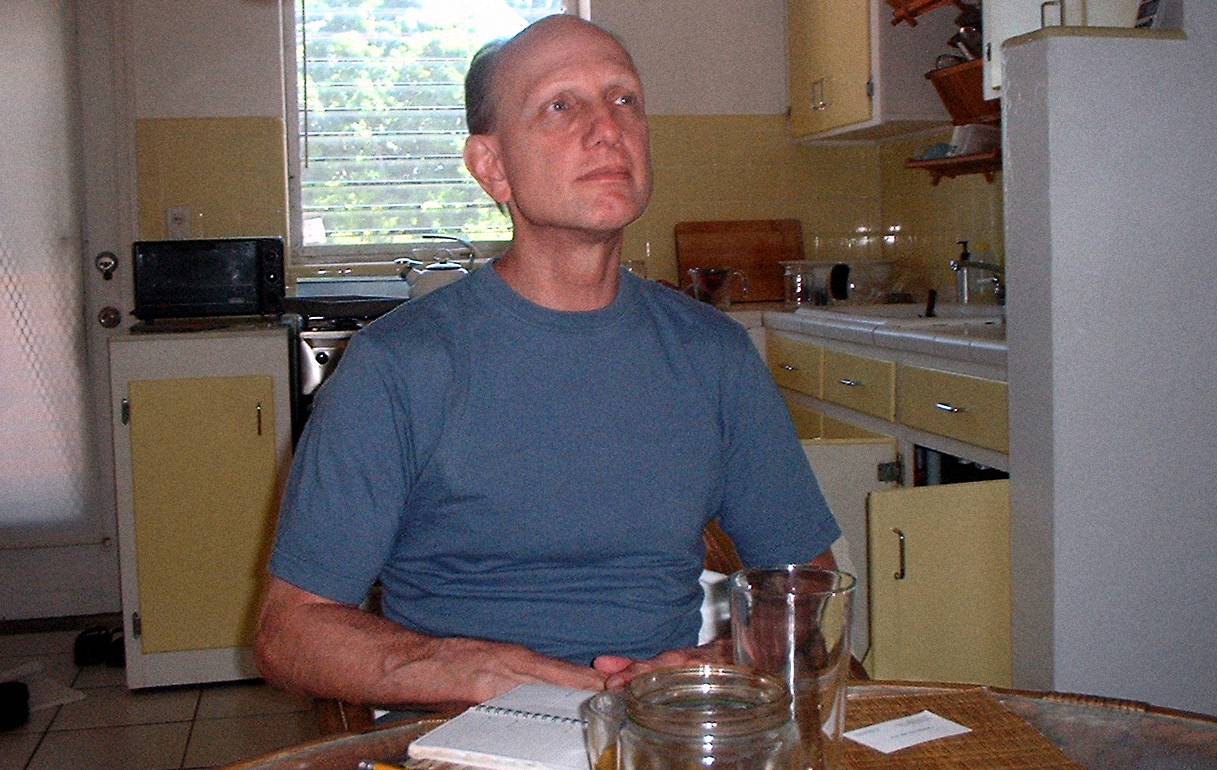
- Born: 1950
- Known for: film maker, installation art, video art, visual music

Charles Recher (c. 1950 – January 26, 2017) was an American installation artist and filmmaker who lived and worked in Miami Beach, Florida. Recher created in excess of one hundred films and videos. His work ranged from the film "Kwagh-Hir (Thing of Magic)", a documentary of the theater tradition of the Tiv people of Nigeria, to "Cars & Fish", Miami Performing Arts Center's inaugural video installation, which cast 600-foot-long swirling images onto adjacent building façades during Art Basel/Miami Beach in 2005.

== Career ==
Recher held numerous guest lectureships and workshops at national and international institutions, including the University of Havana (Cuba). His work was selected for the "Masters of the Avant-Garde" program at Harvard University Carpenter Center for the Arts, where he presented his work as a guest lecturer. For fifteen years he taught the experimental film and video program that he originated for Miami-Dade College's Wolfson Campus. His awards and fellowships include Cultural Consortium Fellowships, National Endowment for the Arts regional grants, and State of Florida Individual Artist Fellowships.

Recher died on January 26, 2017, at the age of 66.

== Select Film and Media Events ==
- Seagull, Bamboo, Water, Leaf, four video loops (2015)
- Mat Wit Bat, Bit Tic Mor, Tu Ba Cal, Wal Di Cal, four video loops (2015)
- Walk Run, two facing screen video loops (2014)
- No I Don't, video loop (2014)
- Small Stuff, 2D and 3D correlative works (2013)
- Rice & Beans, video installation (2012)
- Face2Face, video installation (2011)
- Metro-Mover, video installation (2011)
- Reality 2, internet podcasts (2011)
- Reality 1, internet podcasts (2010)
- Fire, video installation (2010)
- Ticket Booth, video installation (2009)
- Laughing, video installation (2009)
- Casa Valentina, 4 min. video (2008)
- Change, 30-second video (2008)
- Body, video installation (2007)
- Water, video installation (2007)
- Monitor, collaborative video/sound performance (2006)
- Cars & Fish, 2-hour video performance (2005), with the composer Gustavo Matamoros for the Miami Performing Arts Center
- Fish School, 5-foot robotic fish (2005)
- Hypersonic Flock, collaborative sound performance (2005)
- TV-2, video performance (2005)
- Kwagh-hir, 30-min. documentary video of the traditional theatre of the Tiv people in Nigeria (2005), short version shown at the 2006 Miami Film Festival
- Halo, sound performance (2004)
- Trinity, video installation (2003)
- I'm Ready, video installation with actor Julio Gomez (2003)
- TV, video performance (2001)
- Video Prophet, video performance (2000)
- Electrowave (aka Ride), video installation in public bus (1999)
- Angels and Devils, project with 2-D drawn imagery (1998)
- Face II, interactive video installation (1997)
- Coffee Chocolate Art, collaborative video/music installation (1997)
- Fish Tank, 3 min. video (1996)
- You and Him, interactive video installation (1995)
- Florida, 18 min. film (1994)
- Elevator, video installation (1993)
- Florida Study, film installation (1993)
- Face, interactive video installation (1993)
- Dancer and Monument, film installation (1992)
- Viewing, video installation (1991)
- War Games II, film installation (1991)
- Flamingo, 6 min. film (1990)
- Industry, multi-media installation (1990)
- Woman I Never Was, film installation (1990)
- A.M., film installation (1990)
- Static, film installation (1989)
- Monsters, film installation (1989)
- No, film installation (1989)
- My Jamaica Vacation, 45 min. video (1988)
- Washington, 18 min. video (1988)
- Ocean Angle, 60 min. film performance (1986)
- Gorgon, film installation (1985)
- Portrait I, 3 min. film (1985)
- All Hallows Eve, film installation (1984)
- Applause, film installation (1984)
- Volcano, film performance (1983)
- Gulls, film installation (1983)
- Come On Over, film installation (1981)
- Snafu, film installation (1981)
- Teyibahw, 10 min. film (1980)
- Soma, 4 min. video (1979)
- Bike, film performance (1978) (a bicycle with a film projector, which was operated by riding)
- Areba, 3 min. film; Window, film installation (1977)
- Black Out, film installation (1975)
- Overhead, 4 min. film (1975)
- War Games, 3 min. film (1973)
- Couple, 5 min. video (1972)
- Room In, film installation (1972)
- Pushing, film performance (1971)
- Self-Portrait, 5 min. film (1971)
