= José Rey de la Torre =

Cuban classical guitarist and musician (1917–1994)

- Born: December 9, 1917; Gibara, Cuba
- Died: July 21, 1994 (aged 76) San Jose, California
- Genres: Classical music
- Instrument: Classical Guitar
- Labels: SMC, Allegro, Philharmonia, Elektra, Nonesuch, CRI, Epic

José Rey de la Torre (December 9, 1917 – July 21, 1994) was one of the most significant classical guitarists of the mid-twentieth century, and considered by many to be the father of "modern classical guitar technique".

== Early life ==
Rey studied with Severino López in Havana, Cuba. After establishing a career as a child prodigy in Cuba, his family sent him to Barcelona in 1932 to study under the retired virtuoso guitarist Miguel Llobet (1878–1938).

On May 9, 1934, Llobet presented him in a concert at the Academia Marshall together with a pianist and then shortly after in a solo recital. Both received rave reviews from the tough Barcelona critics. Catalan composer and critic Jaime Pahissa described Rey as the most complete guitarist he had heard. Another critic compared him not only with Llobet but also with Pablo Casals.

== Career ==
His American début was at The Town Hall in New York City in 1940. He subsequently made many appearances in the US, Canada and elsewhere. He gave radio broadcasts and played in two television plays. Rey de la Torre gave the US première of Concierto de Aranjuez by Joaquín Rodrigo on November 19, 1959, with the Cleveland Orchestra under the baton of Robert Shaw. He also premièred the Introduction to the Chôros by Heitor Villa-Lobos in New York, in August 1962, and Three Pieces for Guitar by Carlos Chávez in New York on November 14, 1969. A number of works were written for him by various composers, among them Julián Orbón.

=== Spanish Music Center and Allegro recordings ===
Rey made a number of recordings, the earliest of which he found unsatisfactory. In the mid 1940s he recorded his first two LP albums for the Spanish Music Center (SMC) label. The first was titled The Music of Francisco Tárrega - A Guitar Recital, vol. 1 SMC-516 and the second was The Music of Fernando Sor - A Guitar Recital, vol. 2 SMC-517. While it is believed that Andrés Segovia may have been the first to record the F. Sor studies, it was Rey's recordings of these important studies that first made it to vinyl. In the early part of 1950, Rey recorded another two LP albums for the Allegro label. The first was titled Fernando Sor - Grand Sonata, Op.22 AL 76 and the second was German Song from the Minnesingers to the 17th Century AL 90. The later released was a collaborative effort with tenor Earl Rogers. The former album dedicated to Sor was later re-released by Allegro under a different title Rey de la Torre Plays Fernando Sor LEG 9013. The recording was later licensed to other minor record labels (such as Ember, Everest and EL) and it was generally released under the title Rey de la Torre Plays Spanish Guitar Classics.

=== Philharmonia recordings ===
In December, 1950 he recorded the Quintet in D, G. 448 by Luigi Boccherini with the Stuyvesant String Quartet on the short-lived Philharmonia record label. His most significant solo recording was made originally under the Philharmonia label in 1952, and was later re-released, first by Elektra records, and then by Nonesuch. Additionally, a recording exists of "Five Songs on Poems by Federico García Lorca" by Noël Lee with soprano Adele Addison and flutist Samuel Baron in 1961 on the Composers Recordings Inc. (CRI 147).

=== Epic recordings ===
Rey made at least five albums for Epic Records:

- Rey de la Torre Plays Classical Guitar LC 3418 (music by Gaspar Sanz, Fernando Sor, Miguel Llobet, Ponce, Federico Moreno Torroba and Tárrega).
- Virtuoso Guitar LC 3479 (music by Mauro Giuliani, Joaquín Turina, Llobet, Heitor Villa-Lobos, Falla and Tárrega).
- The Romantic Guitar LC 3564 (music by Enrique Granados, Isaac Albéniz, transcribed by Llobet and Segovia; Tárrega, Joaquín Rodrigo, Manuel de Falla and Grau).;
- Recital LC 3815 (stereo BC 1151) (music by Julián Orbón, Joaquin Nin-Culmell, Antonio Lauro, Ignacio Cervantès, Federico Moreno Torroba, Francisco Tárrega;
- Music for One and Two Guitars LC 3674 (stereo BC 1073).

=== Mid career health issues ===
Around 1961, right at a time when his career was flourishing, he suffered a setback: the middle finger of his right hand became less responsive and was a challenge for a number of years until Marianne Eppens, a physical therapist, was able to isolate the cause and offer a remedy. In 1969 they were married and moved to California. In 1975 at the zenith of his career Rey was diagnosed with rheumatoid arthritis, a disease which ended his performing career a year later.

Rey combined a teaching career with his active concert life until his retirement from the stage, at which point he devoted all of his efforts to teaching. He spent a brief period (1975–1977) teaching in New York, before relocating to San Francisco, where he spent the final two decades of his life, teaching in spite of a spiraling debilitation caused by his rheumatoid arthritis.

== Discography ==
- The Music of Francisco Tárrega - A Guitar Recital, vol. 1 SMC-516 (1945)
- The Music of Fernando Sor - A Guitar Recital, vol. 2 SMC-517 (1945)
- Fernando Sor - Grand Sonata, Op.22 AL 76 (1949)
- German Song from the Minnesingers to the 17th Century AL 90 (1949)
- Boccherini: Quintet for Guitar & Strings #1 in D Major/Malipiero: Rispetti E. Strambotti PH-101 (1952)
- 20th Century Music for the Guitar PH-106 (1952)
- 20th Century Music for the Guitar PEKL 244 (1964 - a reissue of 20th Century Music for the Guitar)
- Spanish Music For The Classic Guitar Nonesuch H-71233 (1966 - a reissue of 20th Century Music for the Guitar)
- Rey de la Torre Plays Classical Guitar LC 3418 (1957)
- Virtuoso Guitar LC 3479 (1958)
- The Romantic Guitar LC 3564 (1959)
- Recital LC 3815 (stereo BC 1151)(1962)
- Music for One and Two Guitars LC 3674 (stereo BC 1073)(1966)
- Five Songs on Poems by Federico García Lorca (CRI 147).

== See also ==
- Music of Cuba
- Classical Guitar in Cuba

== Sources ==
- Danner, Peter. Rey de la Torre. Soundboard, XXI, 2, Fall 1994, pg. 7.
- Phillips, Robert. The Influence of Miguel Llobet on the pedagogy, repertoire, and stature of the guitar in the twentieth century. Doctoral dissertation. 2002, OCLC 51796355.
- Rey de la Torre, José. Miguel Llobet, El Mestre. Guitar Review no. 60, Winter 1985, pg. 22–32. (in Spanish)
- Turner, Zane: MusicWeb International.
- Weller, Anthony. 2006. Program notes for Rey de la Torre, Guitar. Bridge Records, Inc. 9188.
