= Mitología de las Aguas =

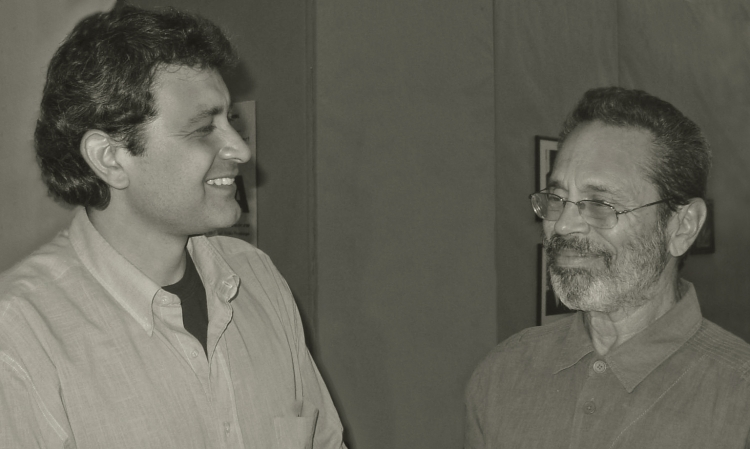
Sef Albertz & Leo Brouwer. Together, the interpreter-dedicatee and the composer of Mitología de las Aguas

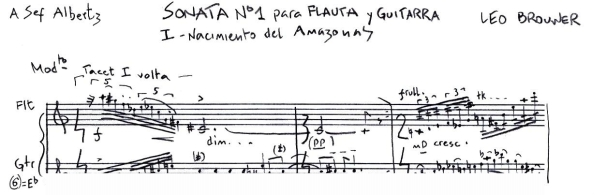
Fragment of the manuscript of Mitología de las aguas

Mitología de las Aguas, or Mythology of the waters, is a composition for flute and guitar by the Cuban composer Leo Brouwer, written in 2009 for the German-Venezuelan guitarist and composer Sef Albertz.

Brouwer defines this work as his first sonata for flute and guitar, and especially dedicated the work to Albertz, who played the world premiere in the German city of Leipzig on September 4 of that year, in the Peterskirche, as part of the closing concert of the International Festival "Con Guitarra" under the cultural patronage of the German Section of UNESCO.

The total duration of this composition, divided into four movements, is approximately 25 minutes.

1. The Birth of the Amazon River (Brazil)
2. The hidden lake of the Mayas (Central America)
3. The Angel Falls (Venezuela)
4. The Güije, goblin of the rivers of Cuba (Caribbean)

Although Brouwer refuses to confine it to a mere description or imitation of nature, the music of this monumental "sonata" is a kind of musical cartography Latin America, with its most emblematic landscapes, characters and cultures. "The composition is a sort of sound film about the powerful elemental force of the waters of my continent; we have the Amazon! This music are thinking about it": The use of scordatura on the guitar, with constant support almost "pedal" on the bass string in E flat ("S" in the German musical nomenclature) is a musical symbolism, which denotes the presence of the dedicatee (Sef) through the musical discourse. Already at the very beginning of the work, Brouwer introduces the "SEF" motif in retrograde combined with some of the most characteristic intervals of his own sound world (minor second, perfect fourth & diminished fifth):

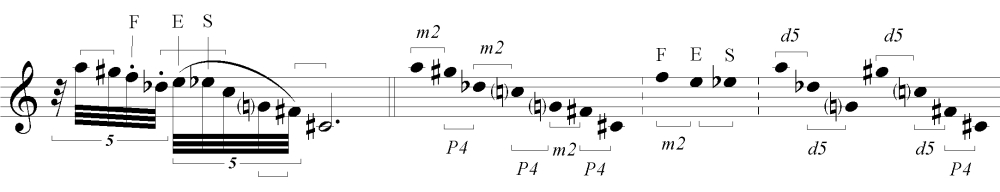
Intervals in Brouwer's Mitología de las Aguas with the "SEF" motif, intercalated in retrograde

The premiere of the work was accompanied by a visual choreography and lighting design specially conceived for the occasion by Sef Albertz and German lighting designer Jürgen Maak.

Brouwer himself was present at this concert, coinciding with the celebration of his 70th Anniversary.

== Critical reception ==
"On Friday evening, the large audience was truly delighted with new music for flute and guitar, plus video and laser projections"

== Discography ==
Duo ALBERTZ has performed the world premiere recording of Mitología de las aguas, which appears on the album "Con Guitarra!"
(GfzM Leipzig, 2011)
