= PUNTO Experimental Music Ensemble =

Gustavo Matamoros and Armando Rodriguez Ruidiaz

PUNTO Experimental Music Ensemble is a contemporary music group active in Miami, Florida, United States.

== The ensemble ==
The ensemble, founded by Venezuelan composer Gustavo Matamoros and Cuban composer Armando Rodriguez Ruidiaz, organized concerts in venues such as the Miami Dade Community College, the Miami Dade Downtown Library and the Cameo Theater in Miami Beach during the 1990s. Most recently, after a decade of inactivity, the members of PUNTO have reunited to continue their activities with the presentation of FLOW, an electroacoustic installation created by Gustavo Matamoros and Armando Rodriguez Ruidiaz for the Listening Gallery of the South FLorida Composers Alliance. The installation was opened to the public on June 5, 2013.

== Mission ==
The nature and mission of PUNTO was defined by its founders in the inaugural concert program as follows:

"Defined as an open setting where various creative tendencies converge to form a nucleus of artistic interaction and stimulation, PUNTO is a composer-based ensemble committed to the performance of works conceptual and experimental in nature. The group utilizes new and old technology to develop aural and visual materials which combine to convey the processes and ideas inherent in each piece.

Founded recently by composers Gustavo Matamoros and Armando Rodríguez, PUNTO provides its members with an outlet or point of departure for controlled experimentation with sound and other media. It attempts to solve questions of performance and presentation of new ideas related to sound and its essence. Its objectives are to approach performance from a different perspective, to set up sound-based situations that engage the mind and create a sense of presence, and to give way to the discovery and implementation of new art forms."

== Achievements ==
During the years that PUNTO remained active, the ensemble acquired recognition from the Miami cultural community, as it is evidenced in its many concerts performed at different venues throughout the city. The group fulfilled its main purpose of presenting to the community an innovative repertoire that could challenge the mind of the audience and create awareness about new trends in music and art in general. In the words of Tim Smith, art reporter at the Sun Sentinel newspaper: "…On April 6 at the Cameo Theatre in Miami Beach, Punto, an ensemble formed by Subtropics director Gustavo Matamoros and composer Armando Rodriguez, will re-create works by Fluxus. And what's Fluxus? It's described as a "fusion of Spike Jones, gags, games vaudeville, Cage and Duchamp." This is one of those only-at-Subtropics presentations aimed at challenging an audience aesthetic consciousness."

== Performances ==
Concerts organized and performed by PUNTO included:

- PUNTO World Premiere Concert. Miami Dade Community College, North Campus. February 5, 1991.
1. Solitary Piano Concerto***, JULIUS. Video and audio tape
2. Quartet 60 x 88 x 120 x 208***, Holland Hopson. Matamoros & Rodriguez, metronomes
3. Occupied Space*, Armando Rodriguez Ruidiaz. Rodriguez, guitar
4. In Memory of Gentle Giant, Gustavo Matamoros. Matamoros, sampler
5. Triangular*, Armando Rodriguez Ruidiaz. Matamoros & Rodriguez, percussion

Statistics: 2 world premieres, 2 florida premieres, 3 florida composers, 1 us composers, 3 hispanic composers. ."

- Round Trip Miami/Madrid. New music by Spanish and Hispanic-American composers", which included music from composers Adolfo Núñez, Juan Pagán and Armando Rodríguez Ruidíaz. Miami Dade Community College Auditorium. March 1993.
- Concert saluting Fluxus, a movement from the 1960s that involved extreme experiments in music and performance art. This program included pieces by Russell Frehling, Gustavo Matamoros, among others. Miami Dade Community College Centre Gallery. April 4, 1995.
- Point of sure return. Concert featuring music from James Tenney, Robert Ashley, Gustavo Matamoros, Julio Roloff and Armando Rodriguez Ruidiaz. Audiotheque, Miami Beach, Florida. February 13, 2014.
