= Brazos Valley Symphony Orchestra =

The Brazos Valley Symphony Orchestra is an American symphony orchestra based in College Station, Texas. The orchestra celebrated its 30th season in 2012. It is an affiliate of the Arts Council of Brazos Valley, and a member of the Texas Association of Symphony Orchestras and the League of American Orchestras. Marcelo Bussiki is the musical director
