= Elías Barreiro =

Cuban guitarist and academic (1930–2025)

Elías Barreiro (5 September 1930 – 17 December 2025) was a Cuban guitarist and academic.

== Life and career ==
=== Academic background ===
Elías Barreiro began his musical studies at the Havana Conservatory of Music. He also studied guitar in Cuba with renowned professor Isaac Nicola before he established his permanent residence in the US in 1966. At a later time, Barreiro received post-graduate classes from Maestro Andrés Segovia at Santiago de Compostela, Spain.

=== Music ===
Barreiro performed extensively in Cuba and abroad as a guitar recitalist and soloist, with orchestra and chamber ensembles. He gave his first public recital at Lyceum Society of Ciego de Avila, Camagüey, Cuba, and his first concert in the US at Tulane University (Dixon Hall Auditorium) in December 1966. As a result of this concert, he was offered a full-time position as professor of guitar at the university. Barreiro also published numerous recordings.

=== Professor ===
Until his retirement, Barreiro served as the Head of the Guitar Program at Tulane University. Several of his former students perform regularly in concerts and hold faculty positions at universities and schools throughout the United States.

=== Other activities ===
Barreiro participated as a member of juries at numerous national and international competitions and also edited and arranged scores for over 40 books on guitar music. He published works with Hansen Publications, the Willis Music Company, Editions Orphee, and later exclusively with Mel Bay Publications. Two selections from Barreiro's book/cd Guitar Music of Cuba, published by Mel Bay Publications, were used as incidental music in the 2002 MGM film Original Sin (2001 film).

=== Personal life and death ===
Barreiro was born in Santiago de Cuba, Cuba on 5 September 1930. He died on 17 December 2025, at the age of 95.

== Awards and recognition ==
Barreiro was the recipient of the 1992 Mentor Award given by the Guitar Foundation of America. In 2000, he received a Lifetime Achievement Award in Music from the New Orleans International Music Colloquium; and a Proclamation Award from the City of New Orleans for outstanding service to the community.
