= Marcelo Bussiki =

Brazilian director and conductor

- Born: Marcelo Bussiki; July 5, 1960 (age 66); Cuiabá, Brazil
- Education: Federal University of Rio de Janeiro
- Occupation: Composer/Conductor/Musician/Director
- Notable credit(s): Oficial, Ordem de Mérito de Mato Grosso
- Website: http://bvso.org/about/music-director/

Marcelo Bussiki (born July 5, 1960) is a Brazilian director and conductor. He currently works with the Brazos Valley Symphony Orchestra in Bryan, Texas. Since 2006, he is also the Chairman of Fine Arts at Blinn College in Bryan, Texas.

== Career ==
Marcelo Bussiki left for Rio De Janeiro at a young age to pursue his musical interests, eventually attending the Brazilian Conservatory of Music. Later, he continued his studies in conducting at the Federal University of Rio de Janeiro. Upon graduation, he landed the position of music director at the Federal University of Mato Graso and held it for six years.

In 1992, under a scholarship from the Brazilian government, he went to the United States to study at the Moores School of Music at the University of Houston. Two years later, he started conducting the University of Houston's New Music Ensemble until 1996. He is currently the conductor and director of the Brazos Valley Symphony Orchestra

Marcelo Bussiki currently lives in Bryan, Texas.

== Awards ==
Marcelo Bussiki was honored with the Ordem de Mérito de Mato Grosso (Mato Grosso Merit Award) because of his contribution not only to musical education, but also to cultural expansion. His most prestigious award to date is the title of "Official”, the highest honor that the Brazilian executive branch (presidential) awards an artist.
