= Joaquín Clerch =

Cuban classical guitarist and composer (born 1965)

- Born: August 8, 1965 (age 60); Havana, Cuba
- Origin: Cuba
- Genres: Classical music, European art music
- Occupations: Classical guitar performer, professor, composer
- Instrument: Classical guitar
- Years active: 1980–present
- Website: www.joaquinclerch.com

Joaquín Clerch (born August 8, 1965) is a Cuban classical guitarist and composer. He was a close friend and protégé of Cuban guitarist and composer Leo Brouwer. Clerch's composition Yemaya won first prize in both the 1987 National Cuban Composition Competition and the 1987 Toronto International Guitar Competition. As of 2012, he resides in Düsseldorf, Germany, where he is a Professor of Guitar at the Robert-Schumann-Hochschule Düsseldorf (Robert Schumann University Düsseldorf).

== Biography ==
Clerch was born in 1965 in Havana and had pursued the Guitar as a child with his first teacher Leopoldina Nuñez. He later went to study at the National School of Arts followed by the Instituto Superior de Arte. His teachers were Marta Cuervo, Antonio Rodriguez, Rey Guerra, Isaac Nicola, Costas Cotsiolis, Leo Brouwer and studied composition with Carlos Fariñas. In 1990 he began his training in Salzburg with a Mozarteum scholarship, where he studied the guitar with Eliot Fisk, early music with Nikolaus Harnoncourt and Anthony Spiri and contemporary music with Oswald Salaberger. He completed his studies with the highest award in 1991, receiving the prize which the Cultural Ministry of Austria grants to the best graduates. He won an Echo Klassik Award in 2009 with Anette Maiburg, and Pancho Amat for their recording "Classica Cubana".

== Concert career ==
Joaquin Clerch made appearances in concerts in Paris, Tokyo, Munich, Frankfurt, Brussels, Athens, Toronto, Havana, Rio de Janeiro, Bogotá, Belgrade, Istanbul and Salzburg, among other places. He has collaborated as a soloist with such well-known orchestras as the Stuttgart Philharmonic Orchestra, the Bogotá Philharmonic Orchestra, the Bavarian Radio Orchestra, the Slovak Symphony Orchestra, the National Symphony Orchestra of Cuba, and the Mozarteum Orchestra Salzburg. With the Orquesta Filarmónica de Gran Canaria under Adrian Leaper, he made the first recording of two guitar concertos dedicated to him by Leo Brouwer (Concierto de la Habana, 1998) and Carlos Fariñas (Concierto, 1996). Since 1999, Joaquín Clerch has been appointed as a professor of guitar at the Robert Schumann University in Düsseldorf. He has been described by Eliot Fisk as the outstanding guitarist of his generation worldwide.
