= Francisco Chaviano =

Cuban human rights activist

Francisco Chaviano is a Cuban human rights activist and mathematics professor.

In 1994, he was the President of the Cuban National Council for Human Rights when he documented cases of people who disappeared or died while trying to leave Cuba. He was arrested in March 1994 and sentenced to 15 years in prison a year later by a military court.

Amnesty International listed him as a prisoner of conscience and said that his trial fell short of international standards.

He was released in August 2007 on parole after becoming Cuba's longest serving political prisoner.
