= Federico Smith =

Cuban composer of American birth (1929–1977)

Federico Smith, born as Frederick Anthony Smith (1929–1977) was a Cuban composer born in the United States.

== Biography ==
Composer and professor Federico Smith was born in Manhattan, New York City, on March 2, 1929. Smith began his musical studies in his country, and in 1950 travelled to Mexico where he lived for the next 12 years. There, Smith continued his studies and contributed as a music critic to the Política magazine, an important leftist Mexican publication. That participation suggests an ideological tendency that had already manifested in his involvement with American communist organizations and his studies of Marxist philosophy.

In 1962, Smith travelled to Havana, Cuba, invited by renowned Mexican artist and director Alfonso Arau with the purpose of collaborating in the reorganization project of the "Teatro Musical de La Habana", and in Cuba he stayed until his death in 1977. The purpose of the "Teatro Musical de La Habana" project was to create a presentation that may include pantomime, dance, song and music hall performance, based on a popular style and inspired by de English vaudeville, that was closely related to the musical comedy. Smith's tasks included the composition of musical shows and the actors' training.

Due to his professional prowess and deep knowledge of mathematics, art, politics and other academic disciplines, Smith was considered a brilliant intellectual with hints of genius during his lifetime; but his professional career, that included musical composition, pedagogy and musical criticism, was negatively influenced by a noticeable addiction to alcohol and tobacco that most probable caused his early decease.

Smith lived almost six years in the Matanzas province, from mid-1971 until his death in 1977; there he developed professionally and creatively as a composer, professor and conductor.

Smith founded an organization in Matanzas called Siglo XX, with the purpose of "promoting the music of our times and all times; especially the Cuban and Latin-American music". Among the activities developed by that cultural organization was the first performance in Cuba of the Six Metamorphoses after Ovid by Benjamin Britten, and the interpretation of L'Histoire du soldat by Igor Stravinsky.

The death of Smith occurred in total isolation, when he was just 48 years old, probably induced by an untreated bronchial pneumonia; although it is also possible that it would be related to a marked physical decay produced by alcoholism.

== Academic background ==
According to a concert program from the group "Nueva Música de México" (New Music of Mexico), Smith began his musical training in the city of Los Angeles, California. He also declared in an employment form to have concluded three years of university training in 1949. In a composer's biography preserved by the Cuban "Casa de las Américas", some piano courses with professor Klaus Goetzer are mentioned.

Smith travelled to Mexico in 1950, a country where he was going to live during the next 12 years between Mexico City and the state of Michoacán. In 1951, Smith entered Mexico's National Conservatory of Music, where he underwent and concluded studies of musical composition and was an active member of the Students Society. There he found in Carlos Jiménez Mabarak a valuable educator committed to the youngest generations. Several records indicate that he received training in composition and counterpoint from Blas Galindo, analysis from Rodolfo Halffter and instrumentation from José Pablo Moncayo.

== Professor ==
Smith worked as professor of harmony, musical analysis, music history and composition at the National Art Schools (Cuba) from 1963 to 1966, and there he served as guide and support to many young musicians who later were going to be excellent professionals; Calixto Álvarez was one of them. His interest for the utilization of mathematical models in analysis and musical composition exerted an important influence in the development of composition techniques such as aleatorism, stochastic and electro-acoustic music in Cuba.

At a later time, between 1969 and 1972, Smith took part in the group of professors that imparted substantial knowledge to the members of a group called "Experimental Sound Group" (GESI) at the Cuban film institute ICAIC.

== Composer ==
Smith composed numerous works for concerts, radio, TV and cinema, characterized by their innovative and experimental style, and in 1966, he collaborated as an arranger and composer with the Cuban Institute of Radio and Television (ICRT).

== Other activities ==
During his stay in Mexico, Smith worked as composer, professor and promoter of the Escuela de Danza (Dance School) of the Instituto Nacional de Bellas Artes. He also participated in the group "Nueva música de México" (New music from Mexico) and lived with the indigenous communities of the Sierra Purépecha in the state of Michoacán where he developed important ethnological studies. He also collaborated as music critic for Política magazine between December 1960 and 1962; and took mathematics classes at the Universidad Nacional Autónoma de México (UNAM).

== Awards ==
Smith received the following awards at the "26 de Julio" National Composition Awards Contest:

- 1969 – Sympbonic Music Award: Música para dos saxofones y orquesta
- 1971 – Chamber Music Award: Música para orquesta No. 3
- 1973 – Choral Music Award: Versos sencillos
- 1975 – Symphonic Music Award: Matanzas 281
- 1976 – Symphonic Music Award: Carta abierta
- 1976 – Chamber Music Mention: Quinteto

== Partial list of works ==
- Music for the show ¡Oh, la gente!
- Trio – oboe, guitar and percussion
- "Música para dos saxofones y orquesta"
- Concierto – oboe and string quartet
- Carta abierta – String orchestra and narrator. Musicalization of the "Versos sencillos" of José Martí. Mixed choir.
- Bicinia – two bassoons
- Matanzas 281 – Homage to the 281th anniversary of the City of Matanzas foundation – 1974 – Symphony orchestra, band, mixed choir, 4 narrators, batá drums and electro-acoustics.
