= Flores Chaviano =

Cuban composer, guitarist, professor and orchestral conductor (born 1946)

- Born: 1946 (age 79–80)
- Origin: Caibarién, Cuba
- Occupations: Composer, guitarist, professor, conductor
- Instrument: guitar

Flores Chaviano (born 10 December 1946) is a Cuban composer, guitarist, professor and orchestral conductor that has achieved great international recognition.

== Academic background ==
Flores Chaviano began his musical studies in his native city of Caibarién, where he received instruction from professor Pedro Julio del Valle, which continued at a later time at the National School of Arts (ENA) in Havana, with renowned professor Isaac Nicola, founder of the modern Cuban Guitar School. Chaviano also studied musical composition at the Instituto Superior de Artes (ISA) with José Ardévol and Sergio Fernández Barroso. After his arrival in Madrid in 1981, he studied at the Real Conservatorio Superior de Música with professor Demetrio Ballesteros. He also includes in his musical formation master classes from the prominent guitarists Leo Brouwer and Alirio Díaz.

== Composer ==
As composer, his artistic works have been recognized by the specialized critique and today he is considered as one of the most important Cuban composers. He has received commissions from CDMC, the Fundación Príncipe de Asturias, the Radio Nacional de España and the Conservatorio de Nalón. Flores Chaviano was president of the composers organization from the Brigada Hermanos Saíz in Cuba during the 1970s.

Chaviano possesses an ample catalog of compositions for a wide variety of ensembles, soloist, choir, ballet, symphonic orchestra, solo guitar and in other formats. His music has been performed by prestigious orchestral and chamber groups such as the Orquesta Sinfónica Nacional de México D. F., the Gdansk Academy in Poland, the Orquesta Sinfónica del Principado de Asturias (OSPA), the Orquesta y Coros de la Comunidad de Madrid, the Orquesta Sinfónica de Granada, the Orquesta Clásica de Madrid, the Filarmónica de Montevideo, Uruguay, the Orquesta Simón Bolívar de Caracas, Venezuela, the Orquesta Sinfónica del Salvador, the Orquesta Sinfónica de Matanzas, Cuba, the Orquesta de Cámara de Nalón, Asturias, España, the Mutare Ensemble from Frankfurt, the Cuarteto Latinoamericano de México, the Quintet of the Komische Opera from Berlin, the Ensemble 21 from New York, the Percussion Quartet of the Florida International University, the Cuarteto Entrequatre de Asturias, the Coro de la Fundación Príncipe de Asturias, the Grupo Círculo and many others. The guitar pieces from Flores Chaviano are considered among the most valued of the modern guitar repertoire.

== Guitarist ==
Flores Chaviano has developed an outstanding career as a contemporary style guitarist, which has been endorsed by his performances as a soloist as well as accompanied by a symphonic orchestra. He has worked intensely offering concerts and galas in Cuba and other countries in Asia, Europe and America. Among his most prominent presentations are those at the Chopin Society of Varsovia, the Lincoln Center in New York City, the Kennedy Center in Washington, the Teatro Real de Madrid, the Círculo de Bellas Artes, and the Auditorio Nacional de Música also at that city and the Teatro de Bellas Artes de México; he has participated at the international guitar festivals of Granada, Alicante and Navarra, Spain, as well as in the Encuentro de Guitarristas de América Latina y el Caribe in Havana, Cuba. He has performed with Cuban orchestras such as those from Santiago de Cuba and Matanzas and the Orquesta Sinfónica Nacional, and also has played with the Orquesta Sinfónica Nacional as well as the New World Symphony in Miami and from the Gdansk Musical Academy in Poland.

== Conductor ==
Flores Chaviano has conducted an important work as musical director and founder of different instrumental groups such as the Ensemble de Segovia, the group Sonido Trece, the Cuarteto Fin de Siglo, the Agrupación Trova Lírica Cubana de Madrid and the Capilla Musical Esteban Salas, based in Madrid and constituted by singers and a small instrumental group, focused on recovering and promoting the music of Esteban Salas and the colonial Hispano-American musical heritage. He has been a founder of the Andrés Segovia in Memoriam Festival, sponsored by the Sociedad General de Autores y Editores de España (SGAE), and also an organizer of the Festival Internacional de Guitarra de Ponferrada, Spain.

== Professor ==
Along with his artistic work, Flores Chaviano has developed an important labor in the musical education field. He was a professor at the Conservatorio "Esteban Salas" of Santiago de Cuba, professor of guitar in the Escuela Nacional de Arte (ENA), the "Amadeo Roldán" Conservatory and the Instituto Superior de Artes (ISA) of Havana. He has also offered contemporary guitar courses at the "Manuel de Falla Courses" in Granada, the Florida International University, the Cátedra "Andrés Segovia" at the Beijing Conservatory, the University of Puerto Rico, the Universidad de Salamanca, the Superior Conservatories of Madrid, Granada and Murcia in Spain the Conservatorio Superior de México and the Superior Conservatories of Rostock and Berlin in Germany. Flores Chaviano currently teaches guitar and chamber music at the Conservatorio Profesional "Federico Moreno Torroba" of Madrid.

From his career as composer, guitarist, professor and conductor, Flores Chaviano has been called "one of the most prestigious and representative Cuban musicians within the Spanish contemporary musical panorama." His work is praised by specialized Spanish musical critics as well as by modern composers and performers.

== Awards and recognitions ==
In 1974, Flores Chaviano received the First Prize at the National Guitar Contest of the Unión de Escritores y Artistas de Cuba.

== Work ==
=== Ballet ===
- Encuentro, 1978

=== Instrumental Ensemble ===
- A partir de un canto yoruba, 1977, para flauta, clarinete y fagot
- Rítmicas núm. 1, para tres percusionistas, 1988
- Entrequatre II, 1989–1990, para violín, viothey cello
- Tres escenas yoruba, 1990
- Patakkín Olorum, 1996
- Obertura V Aniversario y Parrandas, música para once percusionistas, 1997

=== Choir ===
- Ven primavera mía, ven, 1968
- Canción cantada y Tres canciones, para coro infantil, 1979
- Tres rítmicas, para coro infantil, 1978
- 10 de Octubre, 1979
- Thepalma, 1986, coro y orquesta infantil
- Tres canciones cubanas, 1987, para coro mixto

=== Guitar ===
- Seis aires populares cubanos, 1971-1982
- Variaciones sobre el yényere, 1973
- Homenaje a Víctor Jara, para flauta y guitarra, 1974
- Réquiem a un sonero (homenaje a Miguel Matamoros), 1975
- Para dos, para guitarra, 1978
- Concierto, para guitarra y orquesta, 1979
- Espacio, tiempo... recuerdos
- Cinco estudios de grafía
- Textura I, para conjunto de guitarras, 1983
- Seis danzas cubanas, para cuatro guitarras, 1984
- Concertante 1, para guitarra y conjunto instrumental
- Textura II, para conjunto de guitarra, 1985
- Trío, 1986, para flauta, violín y guitarra
- Espacio en blanco, para dos guitarras
- Tríptico a John Lennon, para cuatro guitarras
- Quasar/Gen 87, para flauta, saxofón barítono, guitarra y percusión
- Trío, para flauta, viothey guitarra
- Villalobos/87 (Homenaje), para tres, guitarra eléctrica y percusión, 1987
- Son de negros en Cuba, 1988, para cuatro guitarras y percusión
- Álbum núm. 1, para guitarra
- Suite Bergidum, 1992
- Álbum infantil núm. 2, 1993
- Concierto, para cuatro guitarras y orquesta
- Suite de danzas populares, para guitarra y piano, 1994
- Cinco contradanzas cubanas, 1995, para guitarra y piano
- Fantasía son, e Iya, mo dukpe fobaé, 1996
- Entrequatre, para cuatro guitarras
- Soñada en Gijon (11 string guitar) dedicate to Christian Lavernier

== See also ==
- Music of Cuba
