= Juan Blanco =

Cuban composer (1919–2008)

Juan Blanco (June 29, 1919 in Mariel, Cuba – November 5, 2008 in Havana) was the first Cuban composer to utilize electroacoustics, spatial music and multimedia.

== Education ==
Blanco studied at the Municipal Conservatory of Havana with José Ardévol.

== Work ==
Blanco’s first pieces composed in the 1950s, such as “Triptico Coral”, “Cantata de la paz”, “Elegía” and “Divertimento,” conveyed a nationalistic theme. He was the first Cuban composer to create an electroacoustic piece in 1961. This first composition, titled “Musica Para Danza”, was produced with an oscillator and three tape recorders.

In 1970, Blanco began to work as a music advisor for the Department of Propaganda of ICAP (Insituto Cubano de Amistad con Los Pueblos). In this capacity, he created electroacoustic music for all the audiovisual materials produced by ICAP. After working for nine years without payment, Blanco finally obtained financing to establish an Electroacoustic Studio. He was appointed as Director of the Studio, under the condition that he should be the only one to use the facility. After several months, he opened the studio to all composers interested in working with electroacoustic technology, thus creating the ICAP Electroacoustic Music Workshop (TIME), where he provided direct training to participants.

In 1990, the ICAP Workshop changed its name to Laboratorio Nacional de Música Electroacústica (LNME), with the objective of promoting and supporting the work of Cuban electroaocustic composers and sound artists.

Juan Blanco composed numerous pieces such as Ensemble V, Texturas, Episodio, Contrapunto Espacial, Erotofonias and Studies for recorded group.

He served as musical director of the National Council of Culture (Consejo Nacional de Cultura) for several years, and created the International Electroacoustic Music Festival, "Primavera en Varadero" in 1981, with the purpose of presenting Cuban composer’s electroacoustic and avant-garde works to an international audience and to establish relationships with foreign composers and artists.
