= Carlos Fariñas =

Cuban composer (1934–2002)

Carlos Fariñas (1934 in Cienfuegos – 2002 in La Habana) was a Cuban composer. He was one of the most important masters of the Cuban avant-garde in the 1960s along with Leo Brouwer and Juan Blanco.

He received his first musical orientations in the family. After that he moved to La Habana, Cuba, and was a disciple of the masters Jose Ardevol, Harold Gramatges and Enrique Gonzales Mántici. In 1956 he attended to the courses taught by Aaron Copland on the Tanglewood Music Center in the United States. Between 1961 and 1963 he studied at the Moscow Conservatory.

Fariñas also composed in several modern techniques and styles from traditional symphonic music to computer music. In 1989 he created the Electroacoustic and Computer Music Laboratory at the Art Superior Institute in La Habana, Cuba.

== Notable works ==
- Muros, rejas y vitrales para orquesta (Walls, fences and windows for orchestra)
- Atanos y Tres sones sencillos para piano
- Oda a Camilo Cienfuegos (Ode to Camilo Cienfuegos)
- Despertar (Wake), a ballet
- Sonata for violin and cello
- String Quartet
- Preludio for guitar
- Cancion Triste for guitar
- Musica para Dos Guitarras (guitar)
- Tientos
- Diálogos (Dialogues)
- Relieves (Relieves)
- Hecho historia (Made History), a (ballet)
- In Rerum Natura
- El Bosque ha echado a andar (The Forest has begun to walk)
- Punto y Tonadas, para orquesta de cuerdas (Point and tunes, for string orchestra)
