= National Union of Writers and Artists of Cuba =

Social, cultural and professional organization

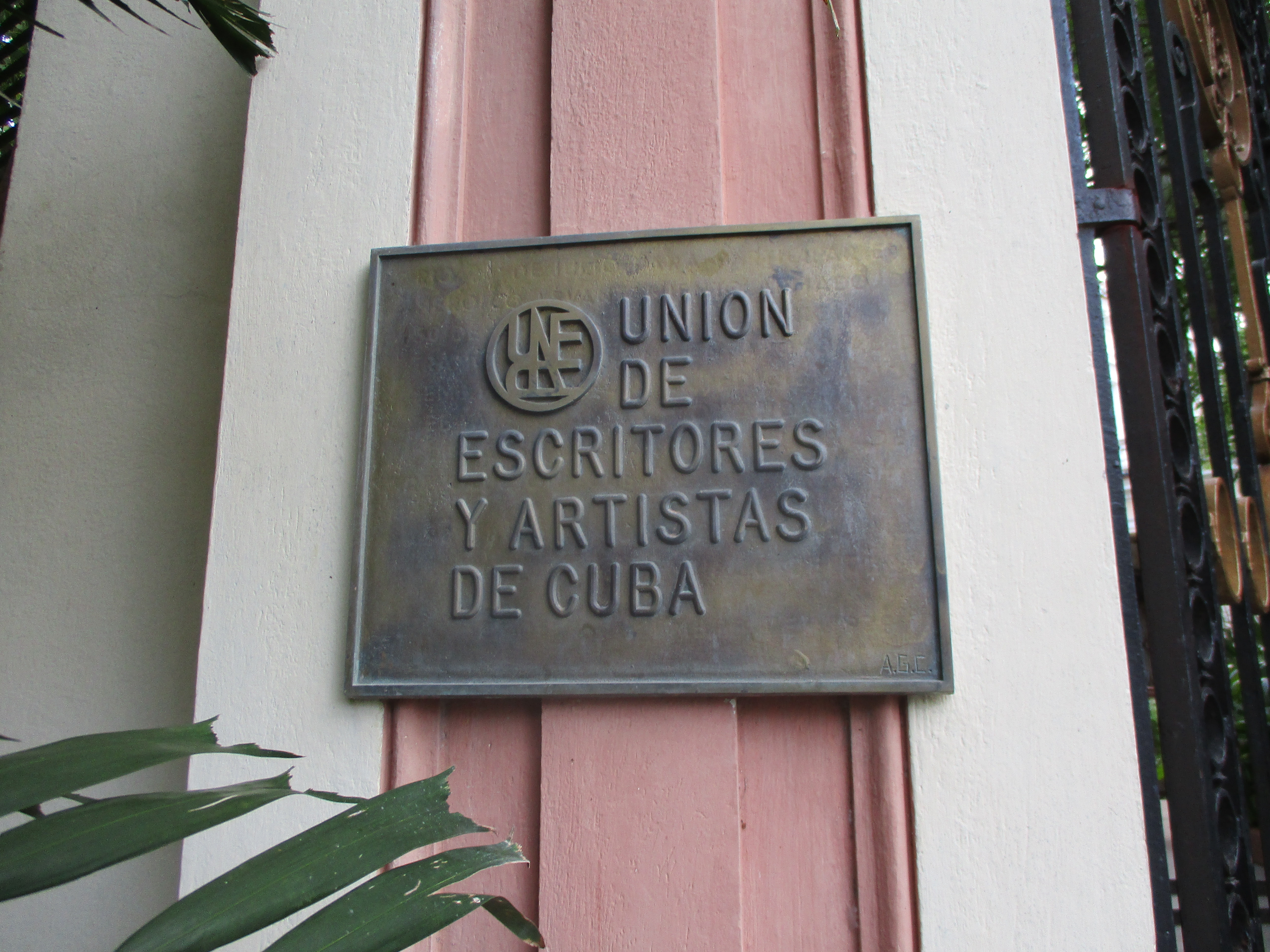
UNEAC plaque in Vedado, Havana

The National Union of Writers and Artists of Cuba (Unión Nacional de Escritores y Artistas de Cuba, UNEAC) is a social, cultural and professional organization of writers, musicians, actors, painters, sculptors, and artists of different genres that are Cuban or have strong ties to Cuba.

Since its inception, UNEAC has gathered renowned artists from all areas of the arts, including Alejo Carpentier, José Lezama Lima, René Portocarrero, and Rogelio Martínez Furé.

== History ==
It was founded on August 22, 1961, by the Cuban poet, Nicolas Guillen. Initially their objective was uniting the intellectuals within the young Cuban Revolution to maintain a genuine Cuban culture.

Beginning in 1962, the group issued La Gaceta de Cuba, with six annual issues that covered themes in literature, visual art, theater, film, and music.

Cuban violinist and professor Evelio Tieles was President of the Music Section from 1977 to 1984.

Manuel Vázquez Portal was expelled from UNEAC because of his dissident views.

== Caracol Contest and Prize ==
Since 1978, UNEAC has run the annual Caracol Contest, which presents awards in the categories of film, radio, television, and criticism or essay, to creators and artists in Cuban radio or audiovisial media. It is one of the oldest media competitions in Cuba.

== See also ==
- Ediciones El Puente
- Roger Aguilar Labrada
