= Isaac Nicola =

Cuban guitarist (1916–1997)

Isaac Nicola Romero (11 April 1916 in Havana, Cuba – 14 July 1997) was a Cuban guitarist and one of the founders of the modern Cuban Guitar School. He was also brother of Clara (Cuqui) Nicola.

== Academic formation ==
Isaac Nicola began studying guitar with his mother, Clara Romero de Nicola, at the Havana Municipal Conservatory. After graduating in 1934, he studied harmony and music history at Conservatorio Bach.

In 1939 Isaac Nicola continued his training in Paris with Emilio Pujol, a disciple of Francisco Tárrega. He also studied the vihuela with Pujol and researched about the guitar's history and literature.

== Work as performer ==
In 1940 Nicola returned to Cuba and traveled again to New York. There he continued a long lasting relationship with Cuban guitarist José Rey de La Torre, with whom he gave a concert in Havana, in 1947. After returning to Cuba, Nicola engaged on a period of performing activity which concluded in 1957, with a concert where he premiered the famous Danza Característica by Leo Brouwer.

== Work as professor ==
In 1942 Nicola began teaching in Pro-Arte Musical in substitution of his mother Clara Romero. In 1948 he occupied a position as auxiliary professor at the Conservatorio Municipal de La Habana, until 1951, when he was appointed as titular professor.

From then on, he devoted himself entirely to teaching, assisted by other dedicated collaborators, such as professors Marta Cuervo, Clara (Cuqui) Nicola (his own sister) and Marianela Bonet. At that time, Nicola proceeded to restructure his mother's method and also added much of his own. He established the basis for a comprehensive guitar didactical system that, including the contribution of many other guitarists, professors and composers, was going to be applied to the academic formation of several generations of Cuban guitarists. Isaac Nicola was professor of numerous renowned Cuban guitar performers and professors such as Leo Brouwer, Jesús Ortega, Marta Cuervo, Clara Nicola, Carlos Molina, Flores Chaviano and Efraín Amador Piñero, among many others.

In 1982, Nicola was one of the founders of the International Guitar Festival in Havana, in which he served permanently as juror.

== Awards and recognitions ==
- Premio Nacional de Enseñanza Artística (1997) (National Award of Artistic Teaching)
- Premio Nacional de Música (1997) ( National Award of Music)
- "Félix Varela" Order (1981)

== See also ==
- Classical Guitar in Cuba
