= Leo Brouwer =

Cuban composer, conductor, and classical guitarist (born 1939)

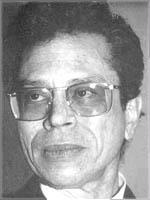

Background information
- Born: Juan Leovigildo Brouwer Mezquida; March 1, 1939 (age 87); Havana, Cuba
- Genres: Classical, folk, aleatoric, atonal
- Occupations: Musician, composer, conductor
- Instrument: Guitar
- Years active: 1967–present
- Labels: Egrem, Zoho Music

Juan Leovigildo Brouwer Mezquida (born March 1, 1939) is a Cuban composer, conductor, and classical guitarist. He is a Member of Honour of the International Music Council.

== Early years ==
Brouwer was born in Havana, Cuba. When he was 13, he began classical guitar with the encouragement of his father, who was an amateur guitarist. His teacher was Isaac Nicola, who was a student of Emilio Pujol, who was himself a student of Francisco Tárrega. At age 17 he performed publicly for the first time and began composing.

Brouwer went to the United States to study music at the Hartt College of Music of the University of Hartford, and later at the Juilliard School, where he studied under Vincent Persichetti and took composition classes with Stefan Wolpe.

In 1970 Brouwer played in the premiere of El Cimarrón by Hans Werner Henze in Berlin. Together with Morton Feldman, he was awarded a 1972 scholarship by the DAAD (German Academic Exchange Service) and to work as a guest composer and lecturer at the Academy of Science and Arts of Berlin. In Germany Brouwer also recorded a number of LPs for Deutsche Grammophon.

== Composing and performing ==
In his early compositions, Brouwer remained close to the rhythms of Cuban music, while later he was drawn to aleatoric music. During the 1960s and 70s, he became interested in the music of modernist composers such as Luigi Nono and Iannis Xenakis, using indeterminacy in works such as Sonograma I. Other works from this period include the guitar pieces Canticum (1968), La espiral eterna (1971), Parábola (1973) and Tarantos (1974). More recently, Brouwer's works have leaned towards tonality and modality. The solo guitar works El Decamerón Negro (1981), Paisaje cubano con campanas (1986), and the Sonata (1990; for Julian Bream) exemplify this tendency. His playing career ended in the early 1980s due to an injury to a tendon in his right hand middle finger.

Brouwer has written for guitar, piano, and percussion, and has composed orchestral works, ballet, and music for over one hundred movies, including the film Like Water for Chocolate. For a guitar competition in Hungary in 1979, he wrote a composition that employed 200 guitarists. He is known for a series of studies called the Etudes Simples. Brouwer has also transcribed Beatles songs for classical guitar.

He has performed and recorded works by Sylvano Bussotti, Hans Werner Henze, Maurice Ohana, Cristóbal Halffter, Leni Alexander, Cornelius Cardew, and Heitor Villa-Lobos.

== Other activities ==
He has been a conductor for many symphony orchestras, including the BBC Concert Orchestra, the Berlin Philharmonic, and the Córdoba Symphony in Spain.

Brouwer is involved in the Concurso y Festival Internacional de Guitarra de la Habana (Havana International Guitar Festival and Competition). He frequently travels to attend guitar festivals throughout the world, and especially to other Latin American countries.

Brouwer, according to the composer himself, has never been a member of the Communist Party of Cuba, but has nevertheless held a number of official posts in Cuba, including with the music department of the Cuban Institute of Cinematographic Art and Industry.

== Family ==
He is the grandson of Cuban composer Ernestina Lecuona y Casado. His great-uncle, Ernesto Lecuona, composed "La Malagueña" and his second cousin, Margarita Lecuona, composed "Babalú", which was popularized by Cuban musician and actor Desi Arnaz. Brouwer is the great-uncle of Al Jourgensen of Ministry fame. Brouwer is the brother of Jourgensen's maternal grandfather. Brouwer has five children.

The name Brouwer is rare in Spanish speaking countries but a common name in Holland. His grandfather from his father's side was Dutch. In 2009 Leo Brouwer visited Holland to conduct a few of his works and called this "the country of my grandfather".

== Selected compositions ==
Chamber and solo instrumental

- Black Decameron, composed in 1981 for American guitarist Sharon Isbin, premiered in 1983.
- 2009 Mitología de las Aguas (Sonata No. 1 for flute and guitar)

Film scores

- 1960: Stories of the Revolution
- 1968: Lucía
- 1968: Memories of Underdevelopment
- 1968: The Last Supper (1976 film)
- 1991: Like Water for Chocolate (film)
- 2019: Brouwer, el origen de la sombra

== Recordings ==
- A Solas — Iliana Matos (2025), an album of works by various composers, including Brouwer's Voyage, Juan Erena's A Solas, and Sergio Assad's Quarantine.

== Other sources ==
- Andy Daly, Leo Brouwer. Music Web International, accessed June 9, 2011
- Brouwer, Leo; Hdez, Hernández; Carmona, Nisleidys Flores (2004). Leo Brouwer: gajes del oficio.
- Hernández, Isabelle (2000). Leo Brouwer. Havana: Editora Musical de Cuba. ISBN 959-7153-01-7.
