= Blanck =

Blanck or de Blanck is a surname and may refer to:

- Fred C. Blanck (1881–1965), American food scientist involved in the founding of the Institute of Food Technologists
- Julio Blanck (1954–2018), Argentine journalist
- Mattias Blanck of Family Groove Company, an unsigned American four piece jam band in Chicago, Illinois
- Peter Blanck (born 1957), American academic, psychologist and lawyer
- Ronald R. Blanck (born 1941), 39th Surgeon General of the United States Army
- Sarah Blanck (born 1977), Australian sailor
- Sebastian Blanck (born 1976), American musician and figurative painter
- Thomas Hamilton Blanck (died 1895), Old West criminal operating in the Pacific Northwest

== De Blanck ==
- Hubert de Blanck (1856–1932), Dutch-born professor, pianist and composer who lived in Cuba
- Olga de Blanck (1916–1998), Cuban pianist, guitarist and composer
- Patrizia De Blanck (1940–2026), Italian television personality and socialite
