= Zoila Gálvez =

- Born: 19 May 1899; Guanajay
- Died: 26 November 1985 (aged 86); Havana
- Occupation: Opera singer
- Awards: Order of Carlos Manuel de Céspedes; Order of Merit Mambi

Josefina Zoila Gálvez Pérez (19 May 1899 – 26 November 1985) was an Afro-Cuban opera singer. A coloratura soprano, she toured internationally and later became an educator.

== Biography ==
Zoila Gálvez was born on 19 May 1899 in Guanajay, Cuba. Her mother was a former enslaved person who had learned to read and her father was Colonel Jose Gálvez of the Cuban Liberation Army. She began playing piano at age six and studied at the conservatory of José Menéndez Areizaga in Pinar del Río. The family moved to Havana in 1910.

Gálvez studied piano at the Hubert de Blanck Conservatory, earning degrees in piano, solfège, and music theory in 1917. She continued studying voice there under Tina Farelli and Arturo Bovi. With the encouragement of her teachers, she studied in Milan under Giacomo Marino at the Milan Conservatory, later studying with Alessandro Moreschi and at the Accademia Nazionale di Santa Cecilia in Rome.

She made her debut in Milan in the 1920s at the Teatro Dal Verme as Amina in Vincenzo Bellini’s La Sonnambula and Gilda in Giuseppe Verdi’s Rigoletto. She spent the next four years performing, most notably as lead in Verdi’s Rigoletto in Rome in 1924. She moved to Spain and studied under tenor Francisco Viñas in Barcelona. She performed in Spain, France, the US, and Mexico, and made her Cuban debut in 1925 with the Havana Symphony Orchestra under Gonzalo Roig.

Successful elsewhere, she failed to make inroads in the United States due to racism. She auditioned at The Town Hall in New York City with the "Shadow Waltz" from Giacomo Meyerbeer's Dinorah and despite an enthusiastic response from the jurors in person, she was not asked to perform. She did find a receptive audience amongst African-Americans, however. She performed in the musical revue Rang-Tang and gave solo concerts at venues like Harlem's Grace Congregational Church, singing African-American spirituals in addition to arias and Cuban music.

She returned to Cuba in 1929, where she performed in person and on the radio. In 1939, she began teaching at the Conservatorio Municipal de La Habana, now the Conservatorio Amadeo Roldán, which she did on and off until 1972. In the 1950s, she returned to performing in the United States, finally appearing at The Town Hall in 1951 and at Carnegie Hall in 1953, the latter accompanied by Hungarian pianist Borislav Bazala. Following the Cuban Revolution, she was an active supporter of the communist party. She gave her last public performance in 1966 at the Palace of Fine Arts in Havana.

Zoila Gálvez died on 26 November 1985 in Havana.
