= Gisela Hernández =

Gisela Hernández Gonzalo (1912−1971) was a Cuban composer. Aware of political necessity, she established ties with the Castro government in return for recognition of her activities as a music teacher and composer. She was also a member of the nationalistic Grupo Minorista that led a movement to incorporate Afro-Cuban sounds into larger forms of music.

Hernández taught music at the Hubert de Blanck Conservatory, and with Olga De Blanck Martín, director of the conservatory, she developed a music education system that made significant changes in Mexican music education. With de Blanck, she also co-founded Ediciones de Blanck publishing and became instrumental in publishing critical editions of Ignacio Cervantes' music.

== Works ==
Hernández often used Afro-Cuban elements in her compositions. Selected works include:

- Triptico, song cycle, 1967 (Text: Guillén, poet)

“Palma sola” “¡Ay, señora mi vencia!” “Sangres derramadas”

- Deprisa tierra, deprisa (in Nueve canciones) (Text: Juan Ramón Jiménez)
- Diálogo (in Nueve canciones) (Text: Dulce María Loynaz)
- Huerto de marzo (in Nueve canciones) (Text: Federico García Lorca)
- Mi corazón lo tragó el mar (in Nueve canciones) (Text: Mirta Aguirre Carreras)
- Romancillo (in Nueve canciones) (Text: Federico García Lorca)
- Sólo por el rocío (in Nueve canciones) (Text: Federico García Lorca)
- Tránsito (in Nueve canciones) (Text: Rabindranath Tagore)
- Única mar (in Nueve canciones) (Text: Mirta Aguirre Carreras)
- Voy a medirme el amor (in Nueve canciones) (Text: Dulce María Loynaz)

Other solo vocal works include: “Ay, señora, mi vecina!” “Canto X” (Cintio Vitier) “Cómo vendrás” “Dones” (C. Solis) Dos cantos de cuna “Gaucho de oro fino (Retrato del Ché)” “Iba yo por un camino” (Guillén) “La palma” (Jiménez) “Miraba la noche el alma” (Angel Gaztelu) “Miraba la noche el mar” “Si, acudiras” “Víspera” (Mariano Brull)

Hernández also composed chamber music and works for solo piano, orchestra, and choir.

Her works have been recorded and issued on CD, including:

- Juana Zayas:A Treasury of Cuban Piano Classics Audio CD (January 1, 2006) Music & Arts Programs of America, ASIN: B000050HYQ
