= North Presbyterian Church (Manhattan) =

Church in Manhattan, New York

- U.S. National Register of Historic Places
- U.S. Historic district – Contributing property
- New York State Register of Historic Places
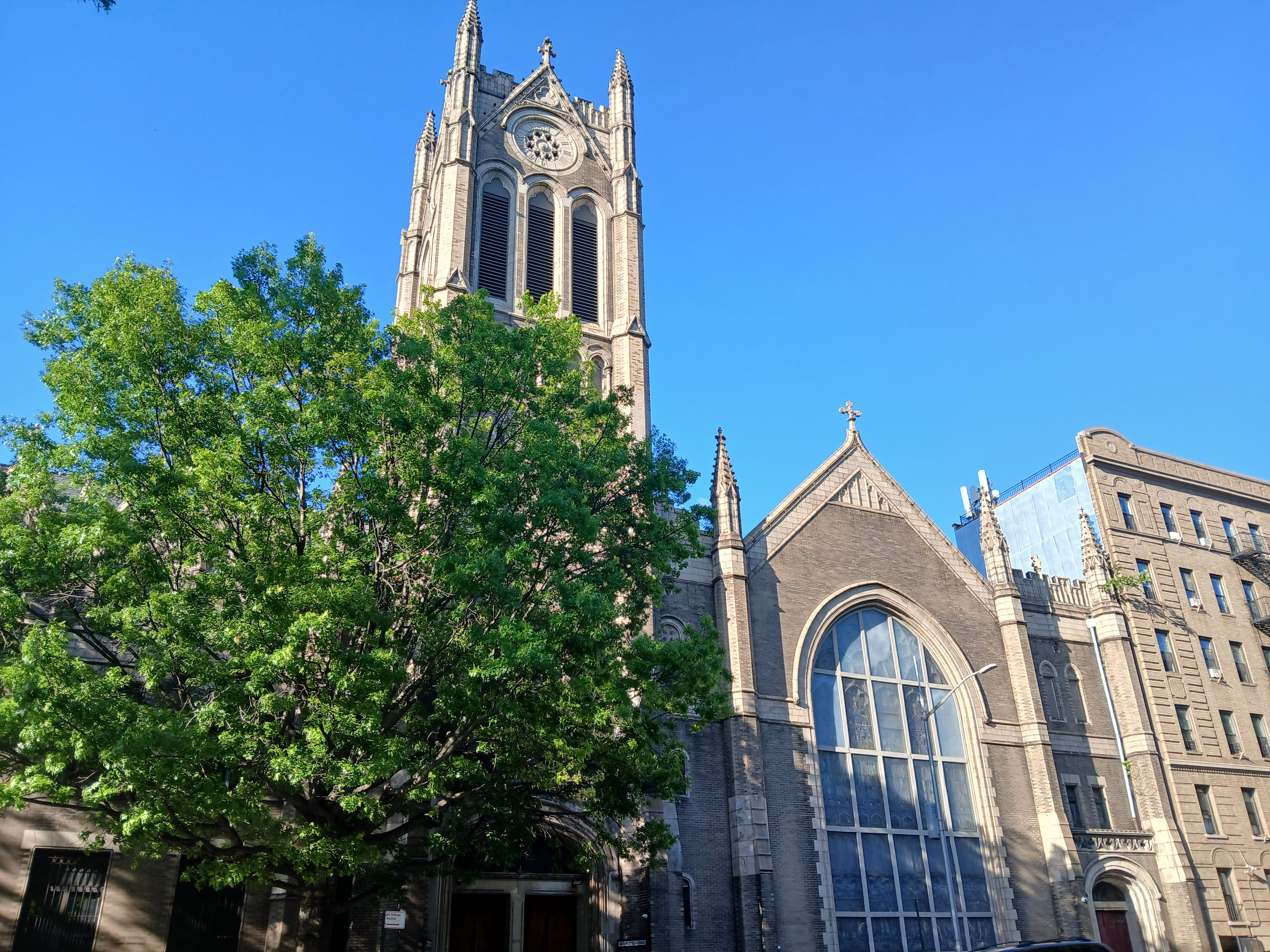
- Location: 525 West 155th Street, New York, New York
- Area: less than one acre
- Architect: Church and parish house: Bannister & Schell, 1905. Memorial House: Eli Benedict, 1923.
- Architectural style: English Gothic (Gothic Revival)
- Website: North Presbyterian Church
- Part of: Dominican Historic District (ID100011048)
- NRHP reference No.: 13001153
- NYSRHP No.: 06101.011569

Significant dates
- Added to NRHP: February 5, 2014
- Designated CP: January 24, 2025
- Designated NYSRHP: December 12, 2013

Map of the churches

The North Presbyterian Church is a building and Presbyterian congregation at 525 West 155th Street in Manhattan, New York City. Its congregation is a combination of three former congregations: North Presbyterian Church (founded in 1847), Washington Heights Presbyterian Church (founded in 1859 and merged with North Church in 1905), and St. Nicholas Avenue Presbyterian Church (founded in 1891 as Lenox Presbyterian Church and merged with North Church in 1927).

North Presbyterian Church was added to the National Register of Historic Places February 5, 2014.

== Washington Heights Church ==
=== Founding ===
In the 1850s, Washington Heights, like the rest of upper Manhattan, was still rural. Many thoroughfares in the neighborhood, though shown on maps, were unbuilt or unopened.

In March 1851, two months after the death of naturalist John James Audubon, his widow sold an entire city block out of her 24-acre farm to neighbor Dennis Harris; it was bounded by 155th and 156th Street and Tenth and Eleventh Avenue (today called Amsterdam Avenue and Broadway, respectively). Harris divided the property into lots for resale.

The Washington Heights Congregational Church was established in 1855 with Harris as one of the founders. He built a modest wooden chapel for the new congregation on a Tenth Avenue lot between 155th and 156th Street and the same year sold the congregation a lot at the northwest corner of Tenth Avenue and 155th Street for a permanent church.

Construction began in 1857. John Kellum was the architect and the contractor was the local firm of Harden & Hopper. The Panic of 1857 caused economic uncertainty (which lasted until 1859), and by the end of the year, with the foundation in and the walls going up, work had to be halted for lack of money. The Rev. O. H. White, the congregation's first pastor, asked to be released, and was.

On January 29, 1858, the congregation voted to join the Presbyterian denomination. It was admitted into the Second Presbytery of New York on May 23, 1859. The same year, Charles Augustus Stoddard graduated from Union Theological Seminary in New York City and was assigned by the presbytery as a supply preacher for the Washington Heights Church. The congregation asked him to remain, and he was ordained pastor of the church in September 1859, beginning a tenure of 24 years.

The church grew, the economic crisis waned, and construction on the new church resumed in 1860, despite the land being fully mortgaged and despite claims, judgments, and builders’ liens against the unfinished structure. Smith & Cooper were the masons and David H. Doremus the carpenter.

=== Permanent home ===
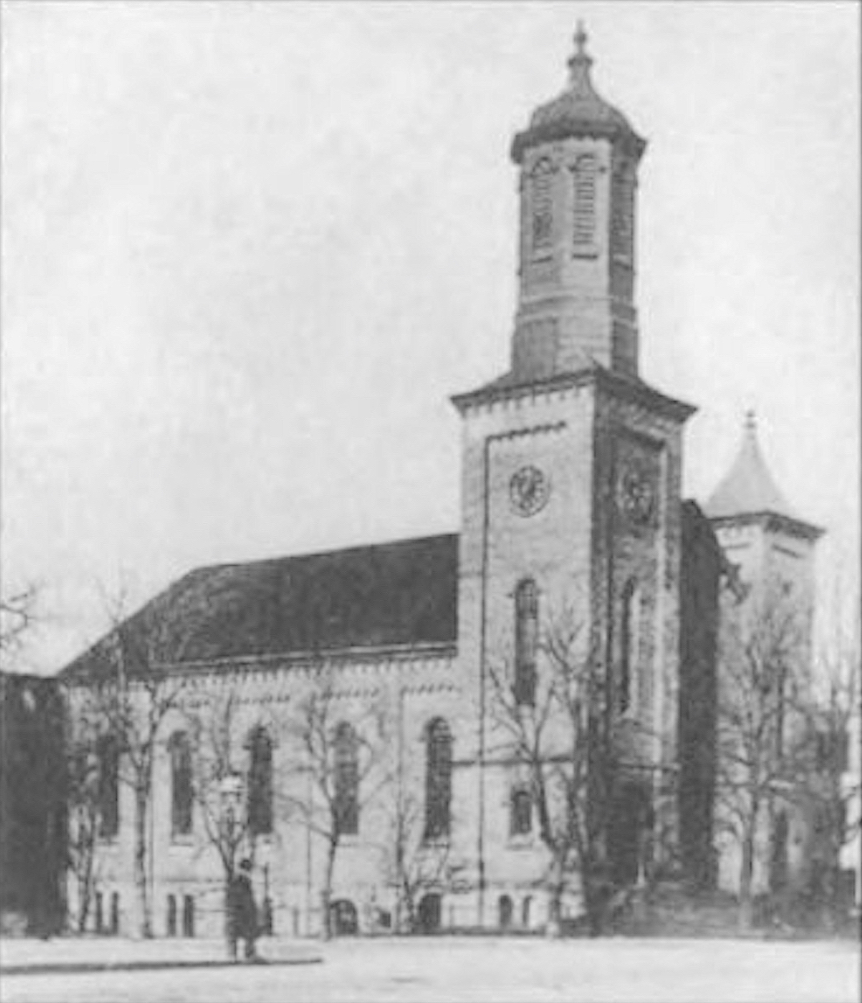
Washington Heights Church

The new church, one of the first houses of worship in upper Manhattan, was dedicated later that year. The building, Romanesque in style, was 85 feet long and 48 feet wide, with two brick towers, one a clock tower 120 feet high topped by a belfry enclosing a 1500-pound bell. The capacity was 600, with 88 pews of varied lengths. The sanctuary was 72 feet by 46 feet with a gallery over the vestibule. The ceilings and upper walls were frescoed, the trim was oak, and the windows were stained glass.

In 1862, the church raised a volunteer choir. In February 1868, William Wheelock donated an organ and paid to add an addition to the rear of the pulpit for it. The organist was Mr. O. Oxnard.

In 1859, Rev. Stoddard had married the daughter of Rev. Dr. Samuel Irenaeus Prime, proprietor and editor of the religious weekly newspaper New York Observer, and became a member of the editorial staff. In 1869, he became associate editor, and in 1873, a proprietor, at which time he offered his resignation to the church. The congregation, however, prevailed upon him to stay, agreeing to release him from some of his responsibilities, and for ten years he was both pastor and newspaper owner-editor. In 1883 he told his congregation his health would no longer allow the workload, and his resignation was accepted as of January 14 of that year. (In 1885, upon the death of Dr. Prime, he assumed the entire management of the Observer, becoming editor-in-chief and publisher until 1902, when he retired.)

On June 3, 1883, Rev. Allen Ford DeCamp was installed as pastor, but he was controversial and his tenure short. At a meeting of the congregation on March 13, 1885, his resignation, which had been requested, was accepted by a majority of one vote.

The Rev. Dr. John Collins Bliss was the next pastor, installed on October 25, 1885. He became pastor emeritus in 1905 and died in 1909.

== North Church on Ninth Avenue ==
=== Temporary quarters ===
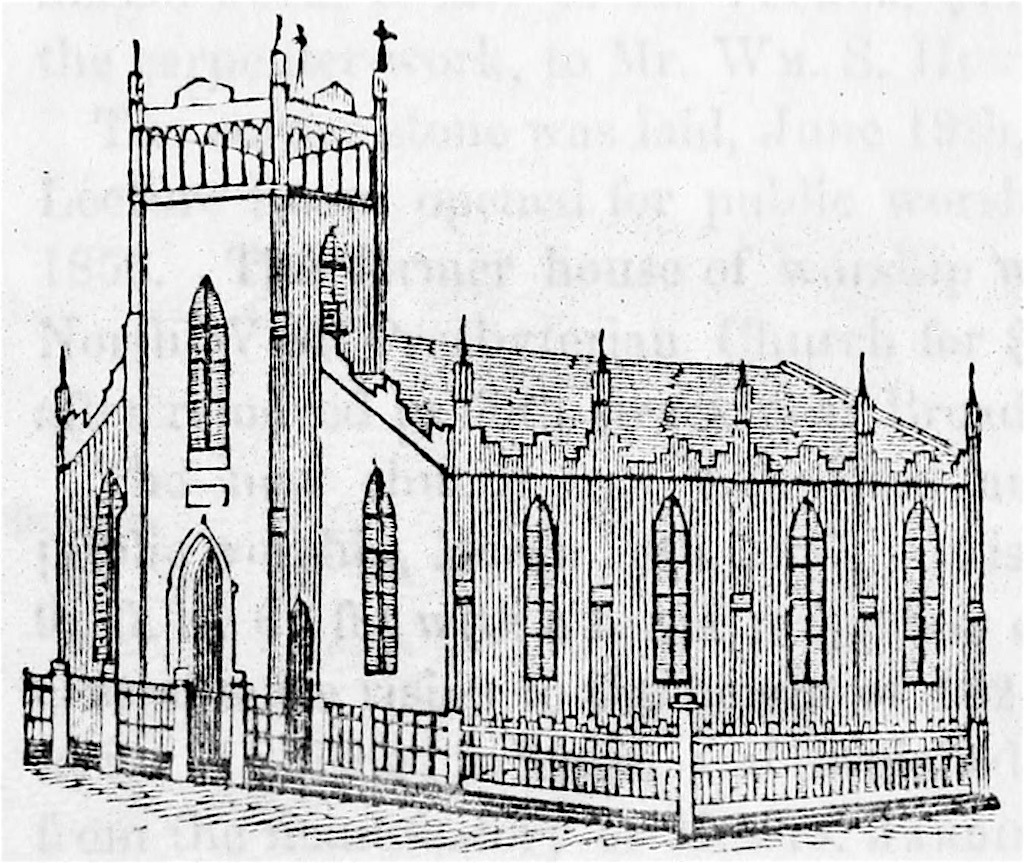
North Church, 32nd Street

In 1845 a Sunday school was opened and taught every week by Mr. Joseph B. Sheffield, assisted by other members of the Mission Association of the Mercer Street Presbyterian Church, in Ward School No. 33 (a public school), on 35th Street near 9th Avenue. The school served as a nucleus for a Christian congregation.

This was a largely undeveloped area of the city. The adjacent streets had not been regulated, and the houses were few and humble. The City Mission Association of the Third and Fourth Presbyteries of New York, organized in October 1846, secured the use of the chapel of the New York Institution for the Blind, in the same area, as a preaching station for the year 1847. They appointed the Rev. Washington Roosevelt as their missionary for this locality beginning January 10.

A church of eight men and eight women was organized June 27, 1847, by Rev. Dr. Thomas H. Skinner (the elder), pastor of the Mercer Street Church, assisted by Rev. William Adams and Rev. Roosevelt. It received the name North Presbyterian Church and was enrolled in the Third Presbytery of New York on October 4. The Sunday school in 35th Street was transferred to the new church. The congregation was chartered as a religious corporation by the New York Legislature in September 1847.

A free lease of four lots of ground on the south side of 32nd Street, midway between 8th and 9th Avenue, was obtained from Mr. James Boorman for seven years, from May 1, 1848; it was subsequently extended to nine years. Plans and estimates having been procured for a temporary house of worship, the contract was given September 29, 1848, to Mr. William S. Hunt, for $2,750. It was completed in April following, at an expense of $3,200. It was a frame building, about 40 by 60 feet, with a short central tower in front. It contained 75 pews, and was furnished with a front gallery. The house was built in the open fields, on a hillside known formerly as "Strawberry Hill".

The house was opened for public worship April 13, 1849. Rev. Roosevelt was chosen the pastor and installed by the Third Presbytery May 6, 1849. He resigned the charge at the close of the year 1855, and was released by the Presbytery January 14, 1856.

Rev. Edwin Francis Hatfield, then pastor of the Seventh Presbyterian Church of this city for 20 years, was chosen to succeed Mr. Roosevelt and was installed February 13, 1856.

Measures were immediately taken to erect a permanent home. Mr. Boorman gave the congregation free and full possession of four lots of ground, 100 feet square, on the northeast corner of 9th Avenue and 31st street, as of May 1. Robert Griffith Hatfield, brother of the pastor, was appointed the architect, and contracts were awarded for the mason-work to Mr. C. H. Tucker ($17,819) and for the carpenter-work to Mr. Hunt ($14,352).

The corner-stone was laid June 19, 1856, and the lecture room opened for public worship November 16, 1856. The former house of worship was sold to the North West Presbyterian Church for $600, and soon after removed to 50th Street, near Broadway. The new church was completed and opened for public worship March 29, 1857.

=== Permanent home ===
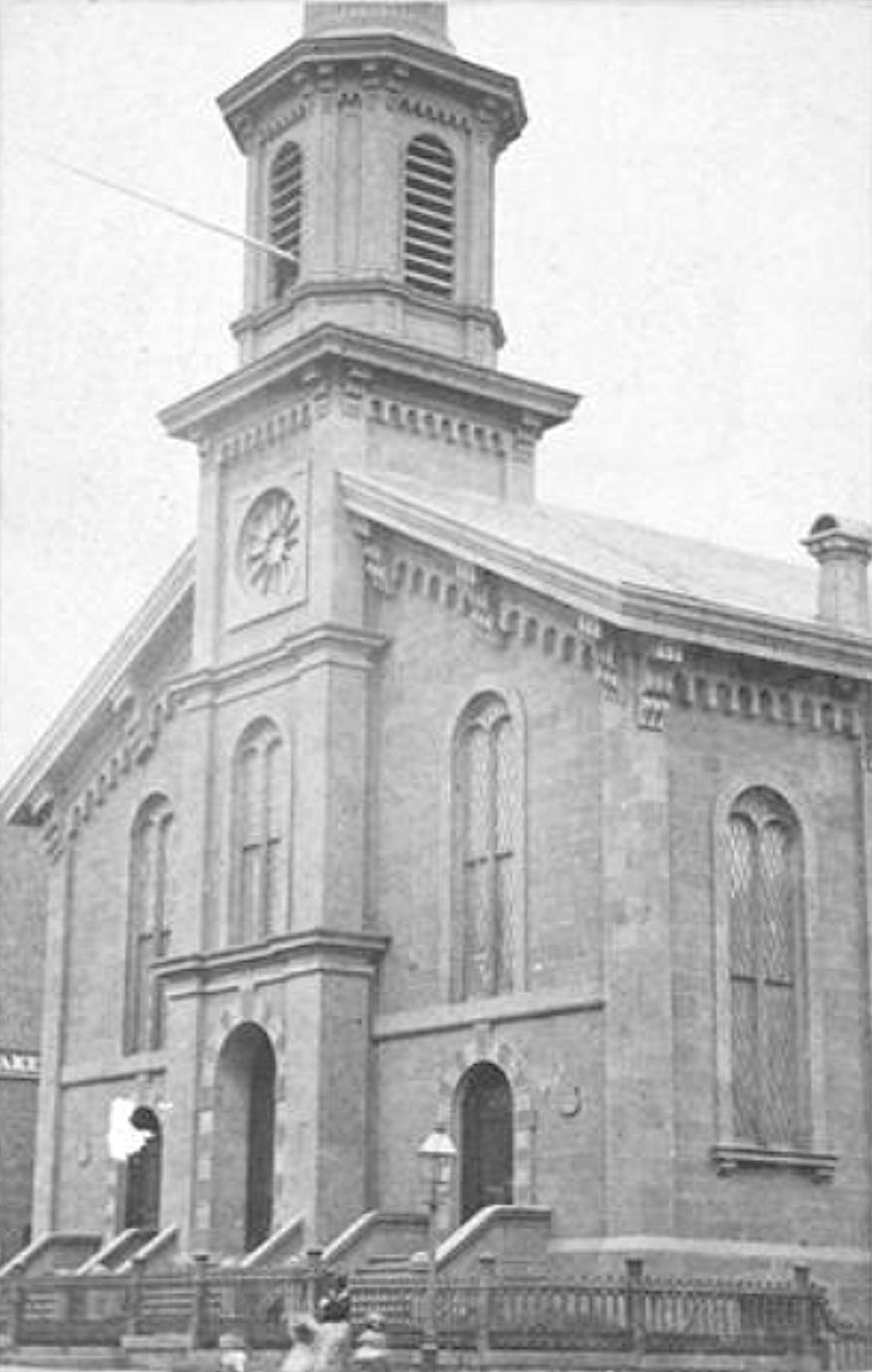
North Church, 374 9th Avenue, in 1863

The church was Romanesque in style, of bluestone, 91 by 66 feet, with a tower projection of four feet (making the depth 95 feet). It had a slate roof with eaves 41 feet, and a ridge 62 feet, above the pavement, and a central wooden spire 182 feet high. The interior was finished in fresco and furnished with an organ from Jardine and Son. There were 152 pews on the main floor and 60 in the two side galleries with a disconnected organ gallery in front. The house was lighted at night from the ceiling. The capacity was 1,000 and the total cost, with the organ and other furniture, was $45,759.28.

When completed, the undertaking had an unpaid debt of $30,000.

The church prospered for a few years, but by the early 1860s, many congregants had moved away, and the society came close to bankruptcy. Rev. Hatfield resigned in October 1863, and Rev. Thomas Street became the third pastor on May 25, 1864. A great fund-raising effort was launched, and by January 22, 1871, the church was debt-free; one week later, the congregation held a celebratory service to mark the achievement.

On April 14, 1873, Rev. Street resigned on account of health, and on September 21, 31-year-old Rev. Stealy Bales Rossiter was installed as the fourth pastor. At the society's 25th anniversary celebration, March 26, 1882, the total membership was 700, and the total since the church's formation was 1,950.

In 1897, a 50th anniversary celebration took place November 14–24, led by Pastor Rossiter. The church had recently been renovated and partly refurnished.

In November 1899, Rev. Rossiter announced his resignation for January 1900 to become American Secretary in New York of the McAll Mission, which did evangelical work in France. At that time, the church had 1,000 members and a Sunday school exceeding 900 students. (In 1903, Rev. Rossiter left that position to become pastor of the First Presbyterian Church in Manila, Philippine Islands.)

Rev. Wilson Davidson Sexton was chosen as the North Church's fifth pastor on November 14, 1900.

On December 11, 1901, the President of the Pennsylvania Railroad Company publicly confirmed the company's plans to build a Hudson River tunnel, and a new passenger station in Manhattan, necessitating the displacement of many buildings, including the North Presbyterian Church. The congregation had no choice but to sell to the railroad company. The negotiation of the sale price took place over several months in 1902.

== Unification in new building ==
=== The merger ===
By 1903, Washington Heights was on the verge of urbanization. The Broadway subway line was begun in 1900. It opened for service from City Hall to 145th Street on October 27, 1904 and to 157th Street on November 5, 1904, and would extend to 242nd Street in 1908. As a direct consequence of the subway's opening, between 1905 and 1920 the population of Manhattan above 125th Street grew by 265 percent. The development of “high class” elevator apartments to house the influx of new residents to Washington Heights and other neighborhoods soon followed.

In March 1903, the North Church and the Washington Heights Church made plans to merge and build a new church in that neighborhood. The Presbytery of New York, governing body of the Presbyterian Church in the city, voted its preliminary approval on June 30, the combination purchased the site for the new building in December, and plans for the new church were filed with the Buildings Department in April 1904. The two congregations began worshipping together in the Fall of 1904 and in February 1905, with construction underway, the Presbytery gave formal approval and the union was finalized. The name was to be North Presbyterian Church, the pastor was to be Rev. Sexton, and Rev. Bliss would become pastor emeritus.

The trustees had planned to purchase land immediately adjacent to the existing church on 155th Street, to replace it with a larger one, but could not come to terms with the landowner. In December 1903, they settled for a midblock plot 150 feet long on 155th Street, and 100 feet deep.

The Washington Heights Church and the land under it were sold. It was being used to store balloons when it caught fire on March 26, 1908, and was destroyed.

=== The new church ===
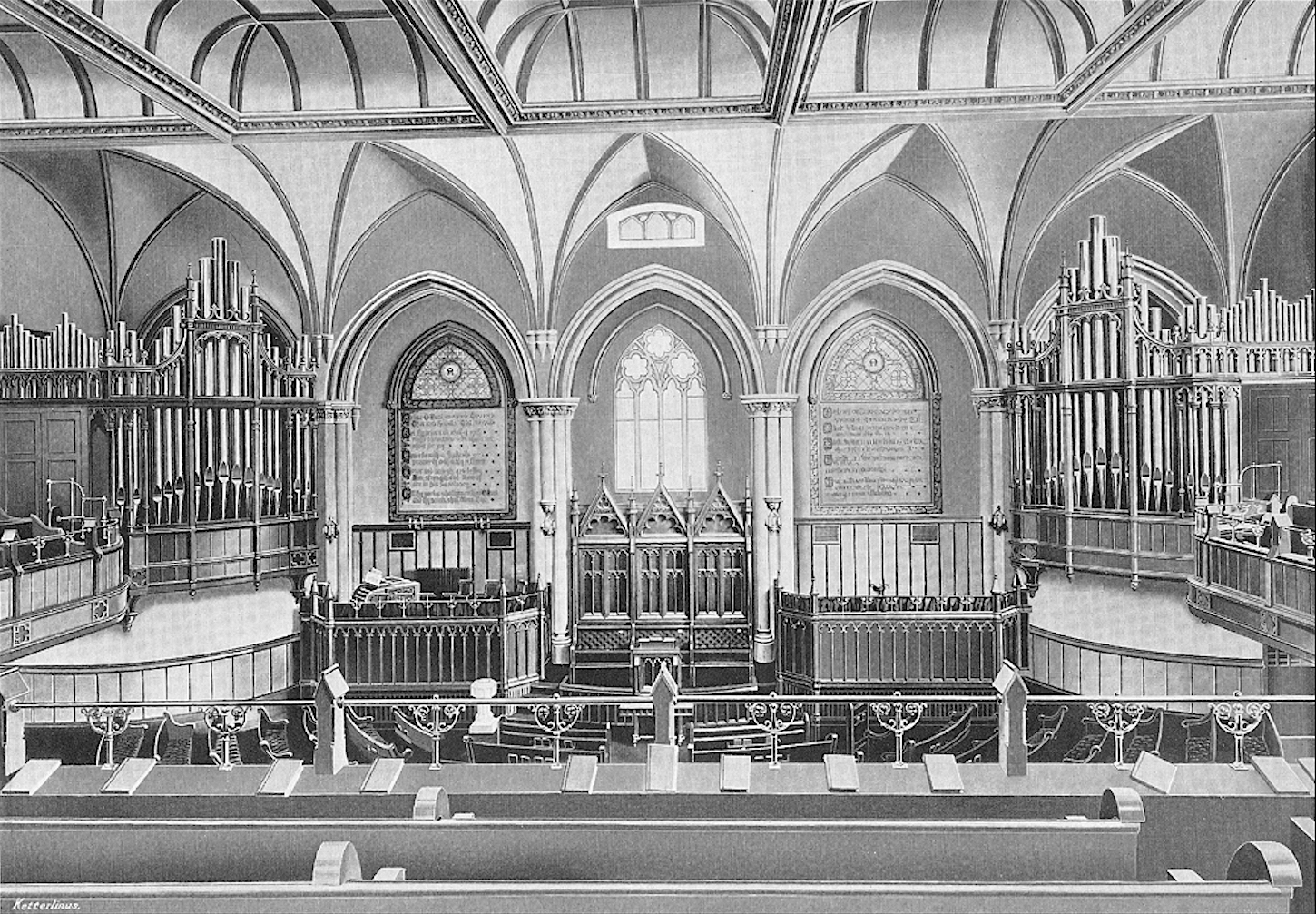
North Church, 155th Street, 1905; facing east, toward altar, from balcony

The new North Presbyterian Church was dedicated Sunday morning, November 5, 1905, beginning a period of dedicatory events through November 24.

The church was commissioned from the architectural firm Bannister and Schell, which later designed the Harlem Savings Bank (1907, today called the Apple Bank for Savings, 124 East 125th Street) and the Holyrood Church (179th Street and Fort Washington Avenue, 1911–1914). Edwin Outwater was the builder and the superintendent of construction was Professor Collins P. Bliss, head of the engineering department of New York University, and son of the pastor emeritus. Rev. Sexton was reported to have formulated the general plan.

The English Gothic design exemplifies a change in church architecture fashion at that time from Romanesque Revival to Gothic Revival. The façade, of smooth, gray brick, limestone, and terra cotta, comprises the sanctuary on the east and parish house on the west, with a 110-foot clock tower, atop the narthex, between them. The sanctuary's sloping floor has wooden pews, facing east, that curve around the main altar space. A balcony provides seating around the north, south, and west sides. The narthex and sanctuary have stained glass skylights. The capacity is 1,000 people. The three-story parish house had a Sunday school with three main rooms and eight classrooms, a library, and private offices for the school superintendent and the secretary. There was a study for the pastor, an apartment for the janitor's family, a boardroom, a kitchen, and a recreation room.

Many members of the 9th Avenue church, although not all, moved with it to Washington Heights.

Rev. Sexton died July 3, 1907, after two weeks' illness, age 54. The sixth pastor of North Church, Rev. John R. Mackay, was installed March 17, 1908. The congregation grew from 664 in 1906 to 1,471 by 1918. In the 1920s, the church had the fourth largest congregation in the Presbytery of New York City. In 1923 a community center, with a gymnasium, a swimming pool, classrooms, and a kitchen, was built adjacent to the parish house to its west. The two-story building, designed by architect Eli Benedict, a member of the church, was called Memorial House to commemorate the men who died in World War I.

Early in 1926, Rev. Mackay submitted his resignation, effective December 6, after which the pulpit was filled by Rev. Dr. Arthur J. Smith, for many years secretary of the Evangelistic Committee of New York City, for seven weeks.

== Harlem congregation ==
=== Lenox Church ===
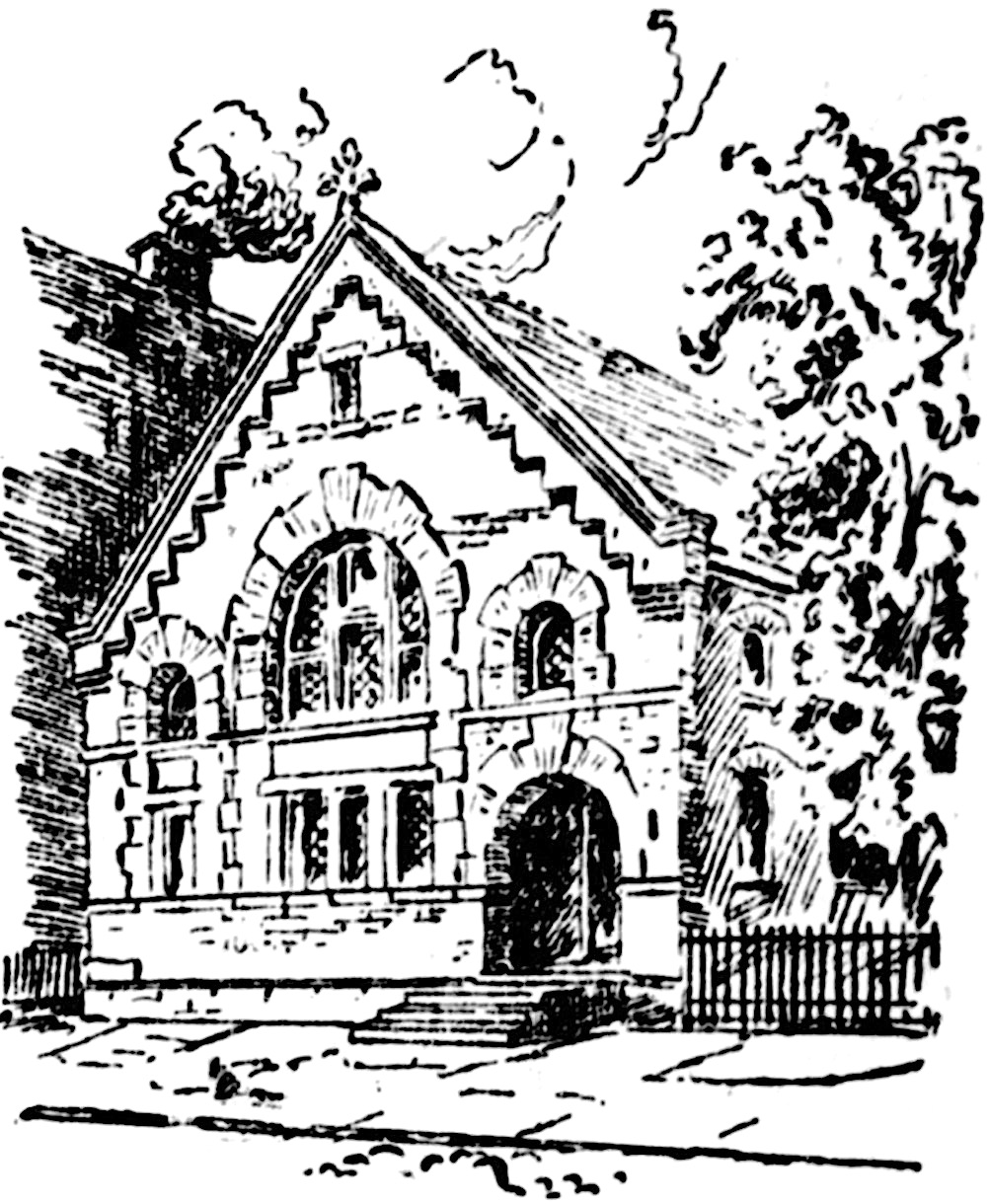
Lenox Presbyterian Church, 1893; today it is Grace Congregational Church

On September 21, 1890, the Rev. A. W. Halsey and William M. Waite opened a Sunday school at 2566 8th Avenue, near 137th Street in Harlem. There were only 24 persons present, and they organized the Lenox Presbyterian Sunday School Association. On Nov. 2, Sunday evening services were begun there, and a little later a Christian Endeavor Society was formed. Then a girls' sewing school and afterward a boys' club were started. On February 27, 1891, the society moved to larger quarters at 2553 8th Avenue. The Rev. Dr. Edward L. Clark, pastor of the Church of the Puritans, took an interest in the young congregation, and when it was known that it was in need of a pastor, he volunteered to guarantee a salary for one. On April 12, 1891, David Garrett Smith (ordained 1892) was engaged to perform the pastoral work of the congregation, which he did for more than a year.

On December 28, 1891, with the approval of the New York Presbytery, the Lenox Presbyterian Church was established, with 37 members. At the same time the congregation was incorporated under the laws of New York, and officers were elected. On January 7, 1892, the trustees of the Church Extension Committee signed a contract to purchase a plot of ground, 140 feet by 100 feet, and the Sunday School Committee of the Presbytery had plans drawn up for a modest midblock church at 308–310 West 139th Street, between 8th Avenue (today called Frederick Douglass Boulevard) and Edgecombe Avenue. The cornerstone was laid September 24, 1892.

The church was dedicated January 8, 1893, by which time it had 60 members. Rev. Dr. Francis Henry Marling officiated at the morning service, Rev. Dr. James H. Hoadley addressed the Sunday school in the afternoon, and Rev. Dr. John Hall gave a sermon at the evening service. The dedication ceremonies continued the next evening.

Designed by architect Joseph Ireland in Romanesque style, the church – initially called a chapel and seen as a temporary home – had a capacity of about 400, an elevation of 45 feet, and a plan 35 by 90 feet. It is made of Ohio brick with brownstone trim and has a Georgia pine interior, galleries for choir and congregation, and facilities for a Sunday school.

After a number of ministers were tried, Rev. Bryce K. Douglas, a favorite with the young people, was unanimously elected pastor at a meeting of the members on February 4. He accepted the call and took up his duties April 1, 1893, but he resigned amid controversy after only a year. The second pastor was Rev. Thomas William Smith, installed December 20, 1894, who served 20 years.

In 1902, the congregation purchased land nearby, on the northwest corner of St. Nicholas Avenue and 141st Street, for a new church, having outgrown the existing one.

Over the summer of 1904, plans were filed with the Buildings Department for a church to be built on the new plot. The cornerstone for the new edifice was laid on October 15, 1904. By then, church membership exceeded 500, and the Sunday school had 600 students.

In early 1904, the 139th Street church was sold. It was later purchased by the Swedish Immanuel Congregational Church, which began services there in March 1905, gave it a thorough renovation a few months later, and installed a new organ in 1909. In 1923 the church was acquired by the Grace Congregational Church of Harlem, which continues to reside there.

=== St. Nicholas Avenue Church ===
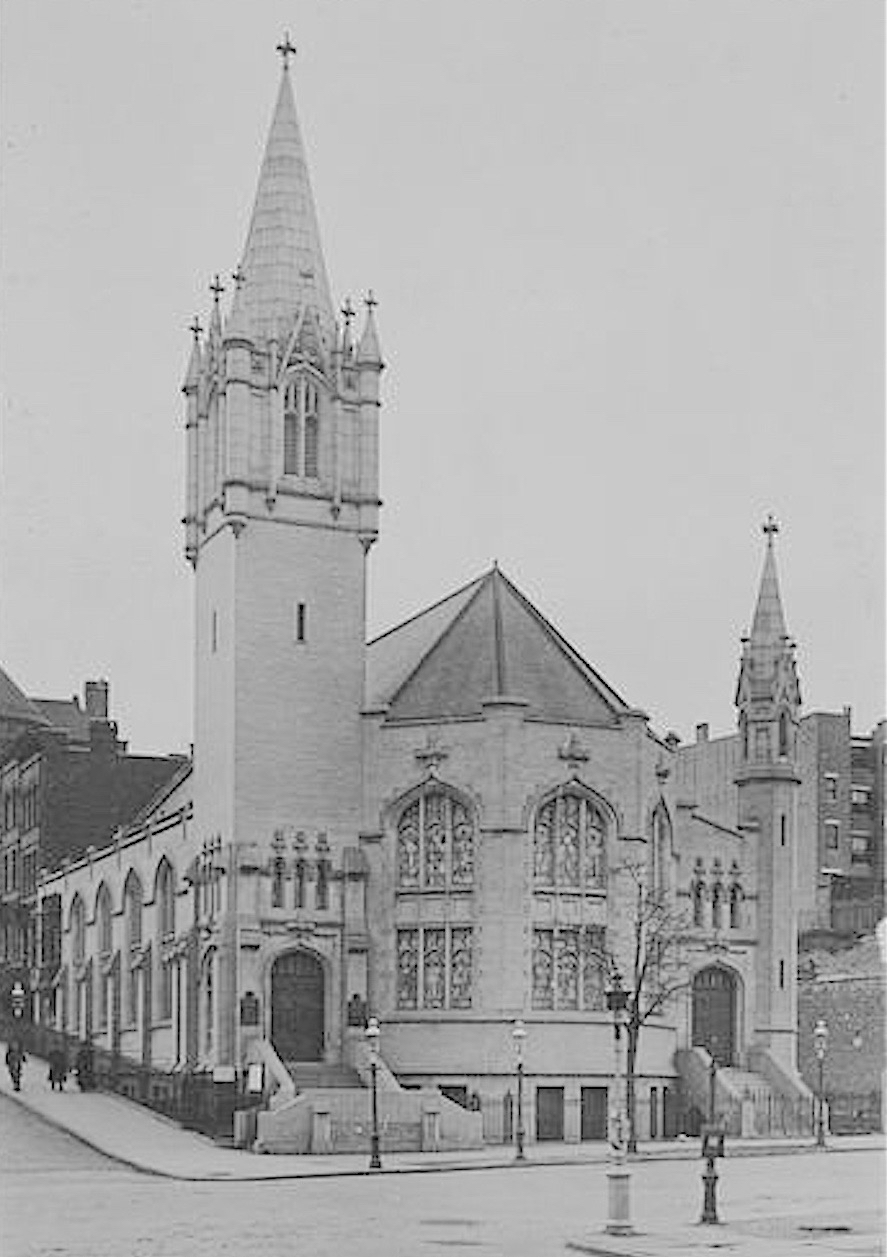
St. Nicholas Avenue Church, c. 1910; since 1927 it has been St. James Presbyterian Church

The dedication of the new St. Nicholas Avenue Church took place on January 21, 1906.

Architect Ludlow & Valentine gave the Gothic-style church a square bell tower, light yellow Roman brick, and Indiana limestone trim. The auditorium was given large Gothic windows in the side walls and some 24 clerestory windows. It was trimmed in brown oak and the ceiling showed open truss work. Including galleries, the capacity was about 800. In addition to the usual rooms for the pastor, choir, and session, the building included a kitchen, a library, and a large social room at the level of the first floor.

Philip L. Schenk was selected as organist for the new church.

On May 1, 1907, William Jennings Bryan, a college classmate of Rev. Smith, the pastor, delivered his famous Chautauqua lecture, "The Prince of Peace".

The townhouse at 58 Hamilton Terrace, near the church, was purchased as a parsonage in 1913.

On December 5, 1914, it was reported that Rev. Smith had left the St. Nicholas Avenue Church for Orange, N. J. Rev. Dr. Elliott Wilber Brown came to the church in January as the temporary supply and in March accepted the congregation's call to become its pastor. He was installed on March 25, 1915.

In 1926 North Church and the St. Nicholas Avenue Church held union services for the summer months, so that one clergyman could serve two churches. (Similar arrangements were made by other churches in the city). By then, population and demographic change within the neighborhood had been substantial. The following year, the two congregations merged at 155th Street, under the North Church name. The last services at St. Nicholas Avenue Church were held January 23, 1927.

The St. Nicholas Avenue Church was transferred to the congregation of St. James Colored Presbyterian Church, of 59–61 West 137th Street, which was descended from one of the earliest black congregations in New York. They made a gala parade from their old home to their new one on Sunday, June 5, 1927, before the opening service. The sermon for the service was preached by Rev. Dr. Harlan G. Mendenhall, Stated Clerk of the New York Presbytery, and Rev. William Lloyd Imes, the pastor of St. James, preached the children's sermon. The congregation, today called St. James Presbyterian Church, continues to make its home there today.

== Second unification ==
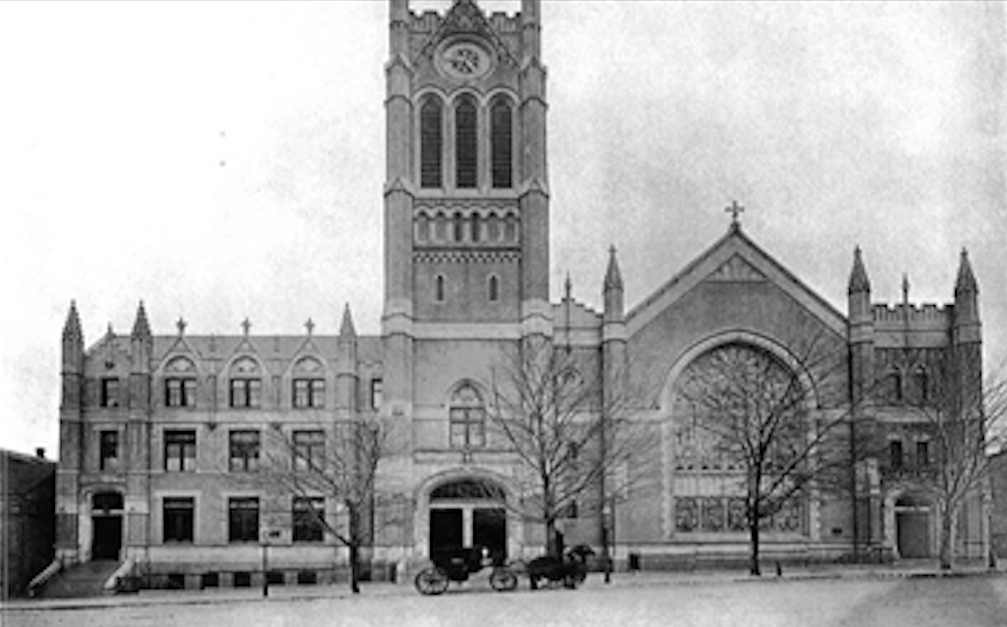
Elevation view of the 1927 building

The first service of the united congregation, whose pastor was Rev. Henry Burnham Kirkland of the St. Nicholas Avenue Church, took place in the North Church on 155th Street January 30, 1927. As a result of the merger with St. Nicholas Avenue, the North Presbyterian Church became the third largest Church in the Presbytery. A 1935 roll included over 950 members.

On September 25, 1932, Rev. Kirkland handed in his resignation, effective January 1, reportedly because differences of opinion between groups representing each of the two churches over administrative matters had been more or less constant since the merger. Rev. Dr. Merle H. Anderson, 60, was installed as pastor December 6, 1933.

Eventually, the congregation fell into decline due to the changing demographics and development of the neighborhood. Many members moved to newer suburbs, and the congregation shrank. In 1957, it reached a low of 267 members. The neighborhood, and the congregation, experienced some growth in the 1960s and 1970s as more African Americans began to move to the area, and in the 1980s, with the move of Dominicans to the neighborhood. But in 2013, it had only 22 members, according to Presbyterian Mission Agency Research Services.

The church underwent a restoration in the early 2000s to repair roof and water damage and restore main public spaces, including the lecture hall and social hall.

Mawuhle Presbyterian Church, a fellowship within the Presbytery of New York City whose members are mostly from Ghana, also calls the building home, worshiping in its sanctuary on Sunday afternoons.

The current pastor of North Presbyterian Church is the Rev. Dr. Mark L. Chapman.
