= María Julia Casanova =

American dramatist

- Born: 1916; Havana, Cuba
- Died: 2004 (aged 87–88); Miami, Florida
- Occupations: Script writer, theater designer, theater director

María Julia Casanova (1916–2004) is recognized for her long career as a script writer for radio and television and as a theater designer and director.

== Biography ==
María Julia Casanova was born in Havana, Cuba, in 1916. She worked for children's theater in Mexico and wrote for the radio serial La Impostora broadcast on Cuba's CMQ station. With Margot de Blanck she founded the Sala Teatro Hubert de Blanck in Havana, in which she occasionally presented her own plays such as Hechizadas and Mujeres.

Exiled in Miami, Florida, in 1960, Casanova worked in radio and later with Sociedad Pro-Arte Grateli. With Armando Navarro and Roberto Miñagorri, she founded the Sala Teatro La Danza, which debuted with the play Corona de Amor by Alejandro Casona and adapted by Casanova. Casanova also worked for the magazine publisher Editorial de Armas.

In the 1980s, she served as artistic director for the Teatro Bellas Artes in Miami, where she presented original works such as Lucy and La Reina Enamorada, and designed theater sets for Teatro Avante. In the 1990s, she realized her dream of owning a theater and opened the Teatro Casanova on Miami's Calle Ocho. Ediciones Universal published her autobiography, Mi vida en el teatro, in 2000. Four years later, María Julia Casanova died in Miami.

== Works or publications ==
- Guiame a Belén : villancico en forma de habanera para tres y cuatro voces. La Habana, Cuba: Ediciones de Blanck. 1957. OCLC 462144319.
- Mi guitarra guajira guajira. Habana: Ministerio de Educación, Dirección de Cultura, Sección de Bellas Artes. 1948. OCLC 803730120.
- Mi vida en el teatro : el teatro como culto y profesión : autobiografía de una teatrista en Cuba y en el exilio. Miami, FL: Ediciones Universal. 2001. OCLC 46972226.
