= Patrizia De Blanck =

Italian television personality (1940–2026)

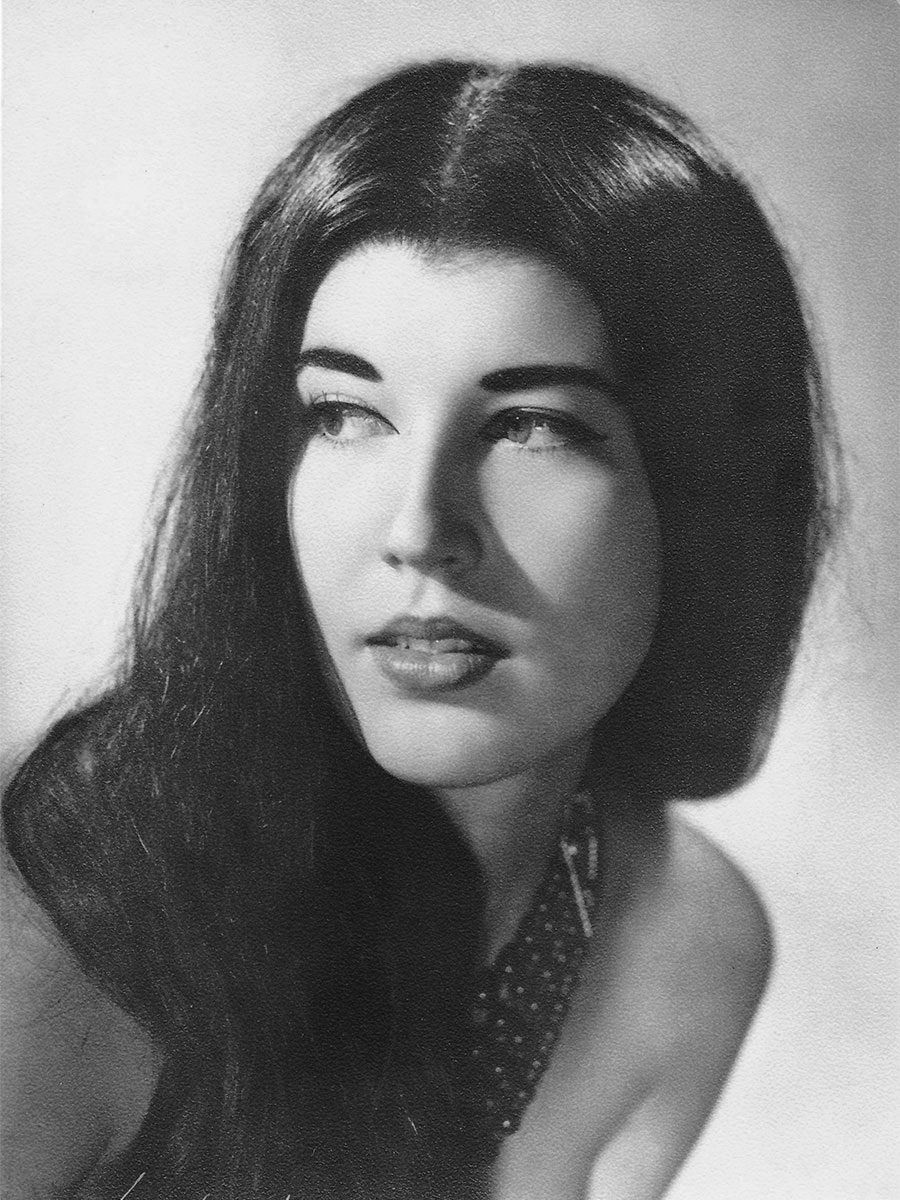
- De Blanck in the 1960s
- Born: Patrizia De Blanck y Menocal; 9 November 1940; Rome, Kingdom of Italy
- Died: 8 February 2026 (aged 85); Rome, Italy
- Occupations: Television personality; socialite
- Style: Countess
- Television: Il Musichiere; L'isola dei famosi; Big Brother VIP
- Spouses: Anthony Leigh Milne (m. 1960; div. 1961); Giuseppe Drommi (m. 1971; died 1999)
- Children: 1
- Parents: Guillermo de Blanck y Menocal (father); Lloyd Dario (mother)
- Relatives: Hubert de Blanck (grandfather); Olga de Blanck (half-aunt); Mario García Menocal (first cousin twice removed)

Patrizia De Blanck y Menocal (9 November 1940 – 8 February 2026) was an Italian television personality and socialite.

== Early life ==
De Blanck was born in Rome on 9 November 1940. Her mother, Countess Lloyd Dario, was the last descendant of the Venetian family that once owned the Ca' Dario palace; her father was Cuban ambassador Guillermo "Willy" de Blanck y Menocal, first cousin once removed of Cuban president Mario García Menocal (and Secretary of State during his presidency) and son of Dutch-Cuban musician Hubert de Blanck. When the communist revolutionaries, led by Fidel Castro, came to power, they nationalized his entire family's assets, including villas and sugar cane and tobacco plantations, exiling the family from Cuba.

== Career ==
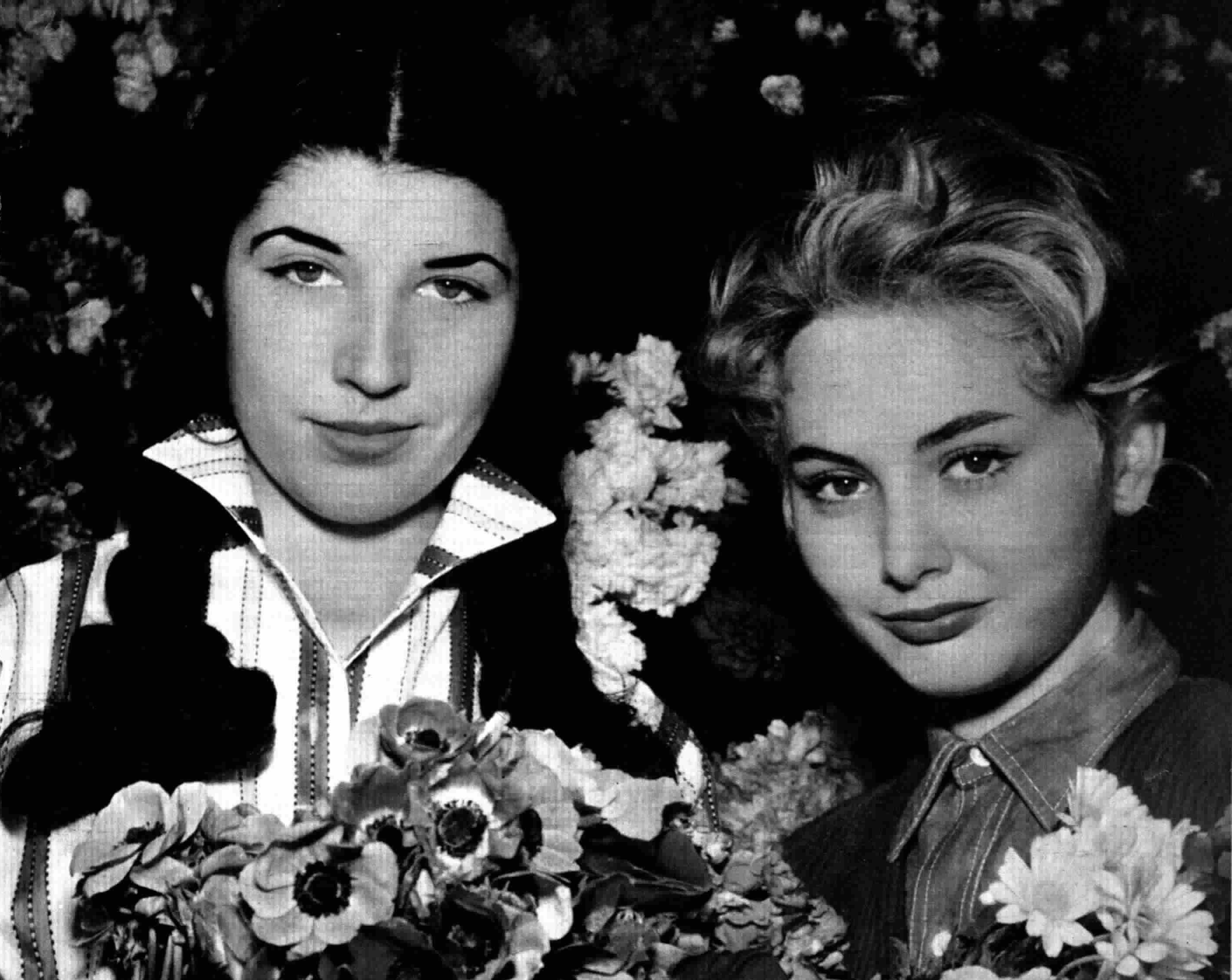
De Blanck (left) and Patrizia Della Rovere in 1958

In 1958, De Blanck became one of the two assistants of the television programme Il Musichiere presented by Mario Riva (a role in which she alternated with Lorella De Luca, Alessandra Panaro, Carla Gravina, Patrizia Della Rovere, Marilù Tolo, Mimma Di Terlizzi and Brunella Tocci).

In 2002, she returned to television, taking part as a regular guest in Chiambretti c'è on Rai 2 with Piero Chiambretti, while the following year she was a regular guest on Domenica in, hosted by Paolo Bonolis. In 2005, she participated as a competitor in the reality show Il ristorante on Rai 1, while from 2006 she intervened in Igor Righetti's radio programme Il ComuniCattivo broadcast on Radio 1 with the column La classe non è acqua, transgresdire con bon ton. In 2008, she was a contestant in the sixth edition of the reality show L'isola dei famosi, reaching the semi-final. In 2020, she participated as a contestant in the fifth edition of Big Brother VIP, being eliminated in the episode of 23 November 2020.

== Personal life ==
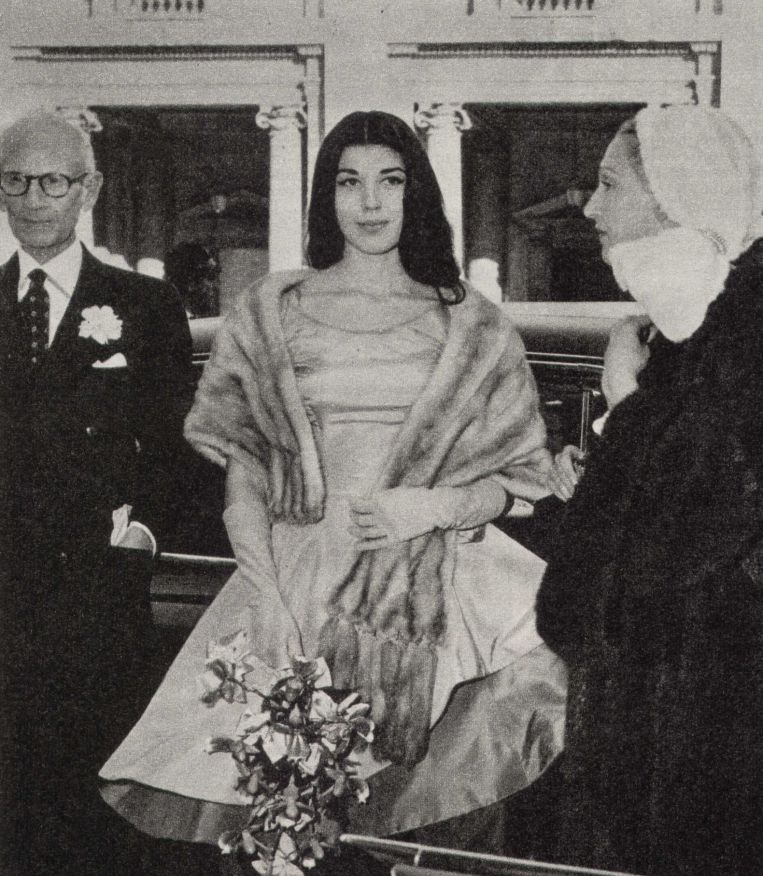
De Blanck on her wedding day with her parents, 1960

A Roman Catholic, in December 1960 De Blanck married British aristocrat Anthony Leigh Milne in a ceremony at the Capitoline Hill. The marriage ended abruptly a few months later, when she caught him cheating on her with his male best friend. She was later engaged to Egyptian entrepreneur Farouk Chourbagi, who was killed in 1964, and she testified in a trial that was highly publicized in Italy.

De Blanck's second marriage was to Giuseppe Drommi, Italian consul in Panama, in 1971. The couple had a daughter, Giada (born 1981). He died in 1999.

=== Paternity controversy ===
During her time on Big Brother VIP, it emerged that she was not a De Blanck by blood, as the journalist Giangavino Sulas, during an episode of Live - Non è la d'Urso with Barbara D'Urso, declared that in 2005 De Blanck had released an interview for the magazine Oggi, where she declared that she was not a biological daughter of her mother's husband but that she was adopted, and that she was actually the daughter of Asvero Gravelli, who was in turn alleged to be an illegitimate son of Italian dictator Benito Mussolini. However, she denied the allegations afterwards.

=== Death ===
De Blanck died after a long illness in Rome on 8 February 2026, at the age of 85.
