= Hubert de Blanck Theater =

Coordinates: 23.1388°N 82.3990°W

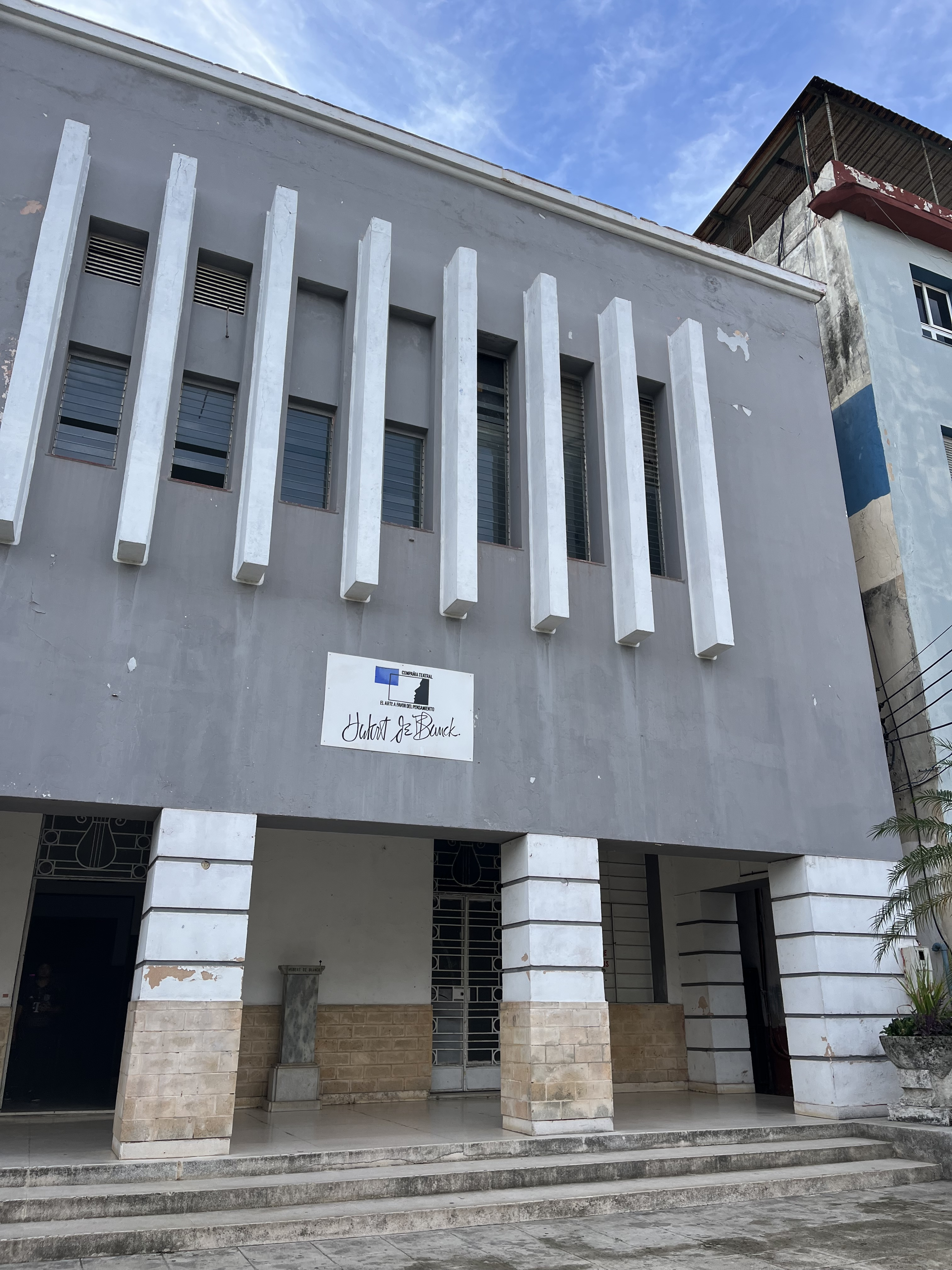
Hubert de Blanck Theater, 2025

The Hubert de Blanck Theater is a small theatre situated on Calle Calzada in the Vedado district of Havana, Cuba, named after musician Hubert de Blanck. It has a seating capacity for 267 people, and offers regular performances of contemporary and classical plays.
