= Thomas Hamilton Blanck =

American criminal

Tom Blanck
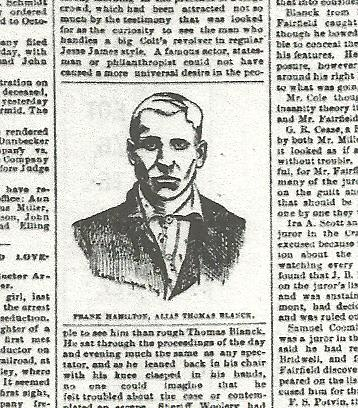
- Newspaper portrait of Thomas Blanck during his trial for the killing of Charles Birdwell, Sept 17, 1894
- Born: Thomas Hamilton Blanck; October 28, 1870; Schenectady, New York
- Died: March 21, 1895 (aged 24); Kent, Washington
- Cause of death: Gunshot wound
- Other names: Frank Hamilton; Michael "Crazy Mike" Hogan
- Occupations: Gas fitter, railroad brakeman, highwayman
- Known for: Robbery, murder

Thomas Hamilton Blanck (October 28, 1870 – March 21, 1895) was a criminal operating on the American Old West in the Pacific Northwest between 1891 and his death following a prison break in 1895. He was also known as "Crazy Mike".

== Arrest ==
In October 1894, Blanck attempted to rob the "Mug Saloon" in Seattle, Washington, an event in which a bartender, Charles Birdwell, was killed. A law enforcement officer was also grazed in the neck during the incident. A Seattle detective named Cudihee arrested a suspect a few days after the Birdwell killing, who gave his name as Tom Blanck. Blanck reportedly then confessed to many additional crimes.

== Confessions made ==
Blanck admitted to having committed an 1890 burglary in Fairhaven, Washington, in which he had been pursued by a policeman, Peter Brugh. Blanck claimed he shot Brugh twice while making good his escape. Blanck had also shot and killed a friend during a poker game that year, in Weiser, Idaho.

Blanck claimed that in January 1891, he and a partner robbed a stagecoach in Nelson, British Columbia. Blanck stated that they had murdered the driver while stealing $4,500. Blanck further stated that in February 1891, he had committed a burglary in Kalama, Washington, for which he was arrested and had subsequently escaped from jail.

On April 10, 1894, Blanck killed officer John Flynn in Helena, Montana. That same month Blanck stated he had killed a Northern Pacific agent, William Ogle, in Belgrade, Montana.

Blanck finished his confessions by admitting to the more recent crimes for which he was responsible. He acknowledged the robbery of several people in the barroom of the Broadwater Hotel in Helena, Montana (which had occurred August 18, 1894) was committed by him; while the following month, in Meaderville, Montana, he had shot and killed a bartender named Steve Gross, and killed the deputy sheriff who was pursuing him for that crime. (On September 20, 1894, in the Meeker Station railroad crossing near Puyallup, Washington, a Constable William Jeffery had come across two men running from a boxcar, and one of the men dropped a bundle, subsequently found to contain a gun. The officer asked the men if they could identify the pistol, and one of the men said yes and claimed his initials were on it. While the officer checked the gun for the marks, the man—Blanck—shot and killed him with a hidden pistol. Following this, the two men robbed a farmer of his horse and wagon and fled the scene.)

The following day, Deputy Sheriffs Harry Moore and John Ball investigated a suspicious man seen near McMillian, Washington. When the officers ordered the stranger to halt, he shot at and wounded Moore in the breast and escaped. On September 22, after buying a large amount of provisions, a Frank Murphy, age 16, was arrested in South Prairie, Washington, because he fit the description of the accomplice of the man who had killed Officer Jeffrey. After being arrested, Murphy admitted he had been with "Hamilton" (Blanck's alias), but claimed that they had parted company.

== Escape ==
After being tried and sentenced to hang for the killing of Birdwell, Blanck used a fake gun made of wood to overwhelm night jailer Jeremiah Yerbury and escaped with the jailer's gun and jail keys on March 17, 1895. Besides a con man named Frank Hart who helped Blanck, several other convicts also escaped: Servius Rutten (convicted murderer); William Holmes (murderer); C.W. Brown (counterfeiter); R.H. Ford (burglar); Charles William (burglar); and William Cosgrove (petty larceny).

== Death ==
Cosgrove and Rutten were quickly recaptured on March 18, 1895, and Holmes was caught on March 21. Later that same day, in Orillia, Washington, Blanck obtained food from James Nelson. Deputy Sheriffs John Crow and John Shepich were notified and pursued Blanck near Kent, Washington. Charles Newell then joined Crow and Shepich, creating a three-man posse. Finding himself cornered, Blanck fired and wounded Shepich. Blanck was ordered to come out of the brush and was shot dead when the posse purportedly thought he had a second gun. The jailer's stolen pistol and keys were found on Blanck's body.

== Aftermath ==
Hart, who had helped Blanck escape from prison, was not himself recaptured until May 4, 1908, in Seattle.
