= Grace Congregational Church of Harlem =

Church in Manhattan, New York

Coordinates: 40°49′09″N 73°56′44″W

Grace Congregational Church of Harlem is a congregational church in Harlem, Manhattan, New York City, New York. It has served African Americans including in the theater industry. The building, designed by Joseph Ireland in a Romanesque architectural style and completed in 1892, served two other congregations before this one.

Marian Anderson and composer Duke Ellington attended the church and organist Sylvia Olden Lee was a congregant.

It is at 308-310 West 139th Street in the Dorrance Brooks Square Historic District. A proposal to redevelop the property would demolish the church and incorporate a new one into a building with housing units.
