= Olga de Blanck =

Cuban pianist, guitarist and composer (1916–1998)

- Born: Olga de Blanck; 11 March 1916; Havana, Republic of Cuba
- Died: 28 July 1998 (aged 82) Havana, Cuba
- Occupations: Pianist; guitarist; composer
- Instruments: Piano; guitar
- Years active: 1935–1998

Olga de Blanck y Martín (11 March 1916 – 28 July 1998) was a Cuban pianist, guitarist and composer.

== Education ==
Born in Havana to composer Hubert de Blanck and his second wife Pilar Martín, in 1924 de Blanck entered the National Conservatory of Music, which her father had founded in 1885. There, she studied piano, solfeggio and music theory. After graduating, she continued harmony studies in Havana with noted Cuban composer, violinist and professor of music Amadeo Roldán (1900–1939), and with professor of music and conductor Pedro Sanjuán (1887–1976). She lived in New York City from 1935–1938 and studied fugue and counterpoint there with Brazilian composer Walter Burle Marx (1902–1990). She lived in Mexico from 1943–1944, studying with composer, violinist and music theorist Julián Carrillo (1875–1965) and composer Carlos Jiménez Mabarak (1916–1994).

== Career ==
On her return to Cuba, she joined the staff of the National Conservatory of Music, where she collaborated on its technical direction, and worked with composer and professor of music Gisela Hernández (1912–1971) to develop a pedagogy for teaching elemental music. She also was instrumental in founding Ediciones de Blanck, a publishing house focused on musicology and music pedagogy. She founded the Sala Teatro Hubert de Blanck, and organized an opera department at the Conservatory which allowed both professional and student singers to develop their talents.

In 1956 she created the Conservatory's Department of Cultural Activities, with its three sectors of Music, Theater and Cultural Activities. The latter coordinated education-related meetings and exchanges between the Conservatory's directors and professors, and their counterparts at its affiliated institutions and subsidiaries and at musical institutions in other countries.

In 1945 she was named the Conservatory's deputy director, and in 1955 became its director.

In 1943, de Blanck's musical Vivimos Hoy was first performed. In 1948 she won the Premio Nacional de la Canción Cubana for her song "Mi Guitarra Guajira", dedicated to singer Esther Borja (born 1913). In 1957 she collaborated in the revision of "40 Dances for Piano" by pianist and composer Ignacio Cervantes (1847–1905), published by Ediciones de Blanck in 1959. In 1965 she was designated a member of the committee to review, compile and edit the most relevant recorded and published works of Cuban composers of the 19th and early 20th centuries in order to relaunch them. A year later, she won all ten prizes in a competition for the best children’s songs, held by the Unión de Pioneros de Cuba, the first national effort by the Cuban communist government to promote musical education for children.

In 1961, she prepared for the Escuela de Instructores de Arte a compendium of selected popular Cuban songs from the works of Eliseo Grenet (1893–1950), Ernesto Lecuona (1895–1963), Sindo Garay (1867–1968) and Tania Castellanos (1920–1988), entitled Música Popular Cubana. Beginning in 1966 she launched in conjunction with the Consejo Nacional de Cultura and the Departamento de Música de la Biblioteca Nacional José Martí a research effort to publish a collection of books on the lives and works of Cuban composers. Only a volume on Ignacio Cervantes was actually edited and published.

In 1968 de Blanck was a member of the technical team of the Plan de Educación, and wrote for the magazine Simientes, for teachers and parents of kindergarteners. In 1971 she co-founded the Museo de la Música in Havana.

As a music educator, de Blanck was greatly influential in the introduction of new methods and programs in Cuban schools. She was the founder of the Cuban musical kindergarten, and with Gisela Hernández, wrote and composed children's songs (approximately 110), musical games and story books, short pieces for piano, and books on promoting music appreciation in young children.

Many of her compositions are inspired by the music, rhythms, and traditional instruments of Cuban folk music, especially the guitar.

== Death ==
De Blanck died in Havana on 28 July 1998, at the age of 82.

== Works ==
- Canciones: setenta y tres canciones; Songs; 1935-1954
- Vivimos hoy; Musical in 3 Acts, text by María Julia Casanova; 1943
- Hotel Tropical; Musical in 3 Acts, text by María Julia Casanova; 1944
- Así te quise; Text by María Collazo; 1954
- Guíame a Belén; Song; 1957
- Muy felices pascuas; Song; 1957
- Canto porque te quiero; Song; 1957
- Mi guitarra guajira; Song; 1957
- Recuerdas aquel diciembre; Song; 1957
- Se que volverás; Song; 1957
- La vida es el amor; Song; 1957
- Brujos; Song; 1957
- ¿Qué estaba pensando?; Song; 1957
- Hasta mañana mi amor; Song; 1957
- Por lejos que estés; Song; 1957
- Hasta luego mi amor; Song; 1957
- Embrujo de amor; Song; 1957
- Un cuento de Navidad; Musical in 3 Acts, text by María Julia Casanova; 1958
- 17 canciones cubanas; Songs; 1960-1970
- 6 traditional Cuban and Latin American Carols; Choral music; 1961-1962
- 24 traditional Cuban and Latin American Songs; Songs; 1961-1962
- El encuentro; Ballet; 1962
- Bohio; Ballet; 1964
- 109 canciones; Songs; 1966-1973
- El mago de Oz; Theater music in 1 Act (incidental music); 1967
- El caballito enano; Musical fairy-tale in 1 Act, text by Dora Alonso; 1967
- Saltarín; Musical fairy-tale, text by Dora Alonso; 1967
- Cantata guajira; Cantata for solo voice, mixed chorus, and orchestra; text by Emilio Ballagas; 1967
- Trío de Cecilia Arizti; Trio for violin, cello and piano; 1968-1969
- Trío de Hubert de Blanck; Trio for violin, cello and piano; 1968-1969
- Mi patria cubana; Children's Songs; 1969
- 26 sobre mi tierra; Lyrics by Mirta Aguirre; 1969
- Canciones infantiles: La guira; Children's Songs; 1970
- La tojosa; Lyrics by Dora Alonso; 1970
- Pentasílabo; Instrumental - for piano, güiro, quijada, and tumbadora; 1972
- Décima es; Lyrics by Mirta Aguirre; 1972
- Yo sé los nombres extraños; Lyrics by José Martí; 1972
- Aprende que hoy no es ayer; Lyrics by Mirta Aguirre; 1972
- Yo no me quejo no; Song; 1972
- Canciones de Misifú; Children's Songs; 1972
- Paso una paloma; Lyrics byNicolás Guillén; 1973
- Camino mujer sin sombra; Lyrics by Mirta Aguirre; 1973
- El agua lenta del río; Lyrics by Mirta Aguirre; 1973
- No quiero aprender tus bailes; Lyrics by Mirta Aguirre; 1973
- 5 canciones; Lyrics by Pepita Veritsky; 1973
- Decimas guerreras; Choral music after the opera Patria by Hubert de Blanck; 1979
- Portocromía; Piano; 1981
- Misa cubana; Mass for mixed voices and organ; 1987
- Mayombe-Bombe-mayombe; Instrumental; 1987
- Son; Lyrics by Rosario Antuña; 1988
- Plegaria Así dijo Santa Rosa Filipa; For solo voice and organ; 1989
- Caña dulce (Sugar Cane); Piano
- El guajirito (The Country Farm Worker); Piano
- Homenaje a la danza cubana (Homage to the Cuban Dance); Piano: I - Manuel Saumell; II - Ignacio Cervantes; III - Ernesto Lecuona
- La jaquita criolla (The Native Jaquita); Piano

Further educational work, often with Gisela Hernández and transcriptions and arrangements of compositions by other composers.
