= Hubert de Blanck =

Dutch-Cuban professor, pianist and composer (1856–1932)

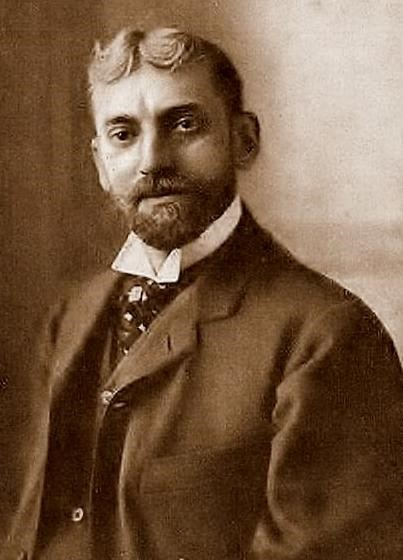

Background information
- Born: Hubertus Christiaan de Blanck; June 14, 1856; Utrecht, Netherlands
- Died: November 28, 1932 (aged 76) Havana, Republic of Cuba
- Education: Royal Conservatory of Liège
- Genres: Classical music
- Occupations: Professor; pianist; composer
- Instrument: Piano
- Years active: 1873–1928
- Spouses: Ana María García Menocal (m. 1881; died 1900); Pilar Martín (m. 1902)

Hubertus Christiaan "Hubert" de Blanck (June 14, 1856 – November 28, 1932) was a Dutch-born professor, pianist and composer who spent the better part of his life in Cuba.

== Early life ==
Born in Utrecht, De Blanck was the son of violinist Willem de Blan(c)k and singer Reine Valet. Hubert studied music with his father until February 1865, when he was admitted to the Royal Conservatory of Liège, Belgium. There he studied piano with Felix Étienne Ledent and solfège. In 1869, aged 13, he won the institution's 2nd Annual Piano Competition by unanimous decision, the winning piece being Hummel's Concerto in B minor for piano and orchestra. His sister Ana had won the violin competition at the conservatory in 1867. In November of that year, he decided to leave the conservatory, and moved to Brussels. After playing a concert at Brussels' Royal Palace, King Leopold II awarded him a scholarship to study at whichever conservatory he chose. Hubert's father chose Cologne, Germany. The family moved there in 1871.

== Career ==
At the Conservatory of Cologne, De Blanck studied piano with Ferdinand Hiller for two years, also learning harmony and composition. He then moved to St. Petersburg, Russia, in 1873, where he made his formal debut as a concert pianist at age seventeen. That same year, he concertized throughout Russia, Switzerland and Germany. In 1874 he was named musical director of the 'Eldorado' theater of Warsaw, Poland, but he left the post the following year.

He later returned to his parents in Cologne, where he met the precocious Brazilian violinist, Eugene Maurice Dengremont (1866–1893). The two soon embarked on several concert tours in Europe, including successful tours of Germany and Denmark. In January 1880 the pair played in Dresden, with German chancellor Wilhelm I in attendance. After the performance it was reported in the Saxonian Journal that the Chancellor gave De Blanck a gold encrusted ruby, a testament to his admiration of the pianist. A music critic from Copenhagen commented that the pianist "received fervent and abundant applause, the likes of which our reserved public is not accustomed to giving".

De Blanck and Dengremont soon made their way to the Americas, landing in Rio de Janeiro in April 1880, where they were received at the court of Emperor Pedro II of Brazil. From there the duo gave ten concerts in Buenos Aires, beginning with a concert at the Politeama on October 3 of that year. They performed a number of times at the Teatro Colón, and on November 16, they took part in a large benefit concert, the proceeds of which funded the creation of a commemorative monument celebrating centenary of the introduction of 'imprenta' in Buenos Aires. The Argentinian government awarded De Blanck a medal for his participation in the concert.

In February 1881, the pianist gave a solo performance in Buenos Aires, after which he travelled to the United States for a series of concerts. Upon arriving in New York City, he performed Weber's Konzertstück, Op. 79, with the New York Philharmonic, under the direction of Theodore Thomas. He was later awarded the position of Professor of Piano at the New York College of Music, which had previously been held by Professor Rafael Joseffy.

Taking advantage of the Christmas vacation afforded him by the college, De Blanck visited Havana for the first time in December 1882 along with his wife. There he performed Anton Rubinstein's Piano Trio, Op. 52, along with Anselmo Lopez and Serafin Ramirez. Cuba's most famous artists, among them Ignacio Cervantes, Pablo Desvernine, and Nicolás Ruiz Espadero, applauded the visiting pianist. Upon his return to New York, De Blanck continued to teach and perform in numerous concerts.

February 1883 found De Blanck on the cover of New York's 'Musical Courier', a famous magazine of the time. That same year, he moved to Havana and began a new life with his wife and children. He immediately began forging relationships with important members of the Cuban arts community, and was soon named president of the Seccion de Philharmonic de 'La Caridad del Cerro'. In March 1884, he organized and conducted, with assistance from the Governor General, a fundraising festival in the 'Tacon' theater to raise money for the construction of the 'Reina Mercedes' hospital. The event was an extraordinary success. The following November De Blanck created the 'Sociedad de Música Clasica' in conjunction with violinists Jose and Feliz Vandergucht, the cellist Charles Werner, and the violist Tomas de la Rosa. The group was formed with the intentions of playing mainly chamber music. In 1886, the 'Sociedad de Música Clasica' became known as the 'Sociedad de Cuartetos Clasicos', which functioned until 1889, its members being Tomás de la Rosa, Anselmo López, Ángel Tempesti, and De Blanck. De Blanck revived the 'Sociedad' in 1909, with Juan Torroella, Arturo Quiñones, Constante Chané, and Antonio Mompo. Toroella went on to run the 'Sociedad' for the next few decades.

Fully ensconced in Cuba's musical community and atmosphere, De Blanck began contemplating Havana's lack of a dedicated conservatory of music. One day in August 1885, he met with various Cuban professors at the home of Anselmo Lopez and suggested the idea that together they could work on creating a Cuban conservatory of music. The group convened a number of times but the project stalled. De Blanck then decided to go it alone. He named Gabriel Morales Valverde ('Edgardo') conservatory secretary and designated Anselmo Lopez, Ernesto Edelmann, Jose Mungol, Tomas Ruiz, Juan Miguel Joval, and Mariano Cuero its first teachers. Rafael Montoro and Anselmo Lopez were especially instrumental in the project. Soon after, Ramón Suaréz Inclán was named Honorary President for his works as a philanthropist and his dedication to music and the arts.

The new conservatory received funding from 'La Caridad Del Cerro', 'La Disputacion Provincial', the 'Real Sociedad Económica', the National Government and the city council of Havana, and opened that September 1885. Originally named the Hubert de Blanck Conservatory, it was later renamed the National Conservatory of Music.

== Personal life and death ==
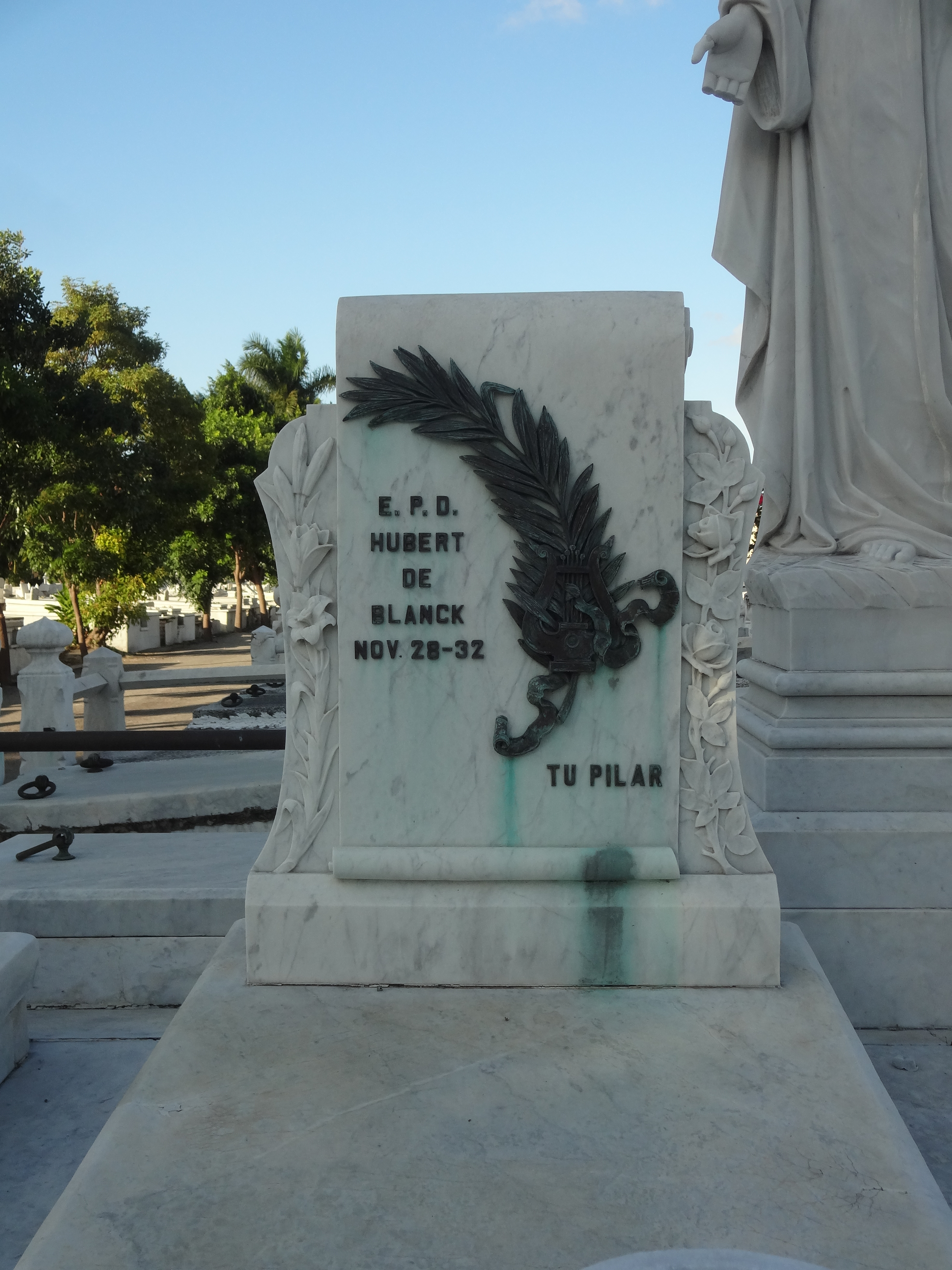
De Blanck's grave in Colón Cemetery

While at New York College of Music, De Blanck met the young Ana María García Menocal (1855–1900), cousin of Mario García Menocal, a later President of Cuba. They were married in New York in November 1881 and had six children: five sons, Guillermo "Willy" (who would become father of socialite Patrizia), Huberto, Armando, Florencio, Narciso; and a daughter, Rosario.

After the death of his first wife in 1900, De Blanck married one of his students, Pilar Martín (1883–1955) in 1902. The couple got three children: Margot, Ernesto and Olga.

Hubert de Blanck died in 1932, at age 76, and was interred in the Colón Cemetery, Havana. Widely acclaimed in Cuba during his lifetime for his significant contribution to the country's culture, he has since been honored with his image on a Cuban postage stamp. As well, a theatrical company and theatre that carry his name were founded in the Vedado district of Havana in 1955.

Ernesto Lecuona dedicated his piano composition Malagueña to De Blanck.

== See also ==
- Music of Cuba

== Sources ==
- Frank Rijckaert, Biography of Hubert de Blanck. Calbona Uitgeverij Rotterdam, 2013, ISBN 978-94-91254-91-8.
- "Hubert de Blanck". Biblioteca Cubana.
