= Alberto =

- Gender: Male

Origin
- Origin: Romance adaptation of an Old Germanic name
- Meaning: Noble and bright

Other names
- See also: Albert, Albertus, Adalbert, Elbert, Adelbert

Alberto is the Romance version of the Latinized form (Albertus) of Germanic Albert. It is used in Italian, Portuguese and Spanish. The diminutive forms are Albertito in Spain or Albertico in some parts of Latin America, Albertino in Italian as well as Tuco as a hypocorism. It derives from the name Adalberto which in turn derives from Athala (meaning noble) and Berth (meaning bright).

== People ==
=== A ===
- Alberto Abadie (born 1968), Spanish economist
- Alberto Abalde (born 1995), Spanish basketball player
- Alberto Abarza (born 1984), Chilean Paralympic swimmer
- Alberto Abdala (1920–1986), Uruguayan attorney, politician, painter, and Vice President of Uruguay from 1967–1972
- Alberto Abengózar (born 1989), Spanish footballer
- Alberto Ablondi (1924–2010), Italian Catholic bishop
- Alberto Acereda (born 1965), Spanish professor
- Alberto Achacaz Walakial (1929–2008), Chilean Kaweskar
- Alberto Achá (1917–1965), Bolivian footballer
- Alberto Acosta (born 1966), Argentine footballer
- Alberto Acosta (diver) (born 1973), Mexican diver
- Alberto Acosta (Mexican footballer) (born 1988), Mexican footballer
- Alberto Acquacalda (1898–1921), Italian anarchist and communist
- Alberto Acquadro (born 1996), Italian footballer
- Alberto Adela (born 1934), Filipino boxer
- Alberto Agnesi (born 1977), Mexican telenovela and stage actor
- Alberto Maria de Agostini (1883–1960), Italian explorer
- Alberto Agra (born 1963), Filipino lawyer
- Alberto Aguilar (sprinter) (born 1985), Venezuelan sprinter
- Alberto Aguilar Leiva (born 1984), Spanish footballer
- Alberto Aguilar (Mexican footballer) (born 1960), Mexican football goalkeeper and manager
- Alberto Aguilera (1842–1913), Spanish politician and lawyer
- Alberto Airola (born 1970), Italian politician
- Alberto Alarcón (born 1986), Argentine footballer
- Alberto Alari (born 1999), Italian footballer
- Alberto Alberani (born 1947), Italian water polo goalkeeper
- Alberto Albero (born 1952), Italian long jumper
- Alberto Alberti (1525/1526–1598), Italian wood carver, architect, painter, and diarist
- Alberto Albístegui (born 1964), Spanish footballer
- Alberto Alcocer (born 1942), Spanish businessman
- Alberto Alcocer y Ribacoba (1886–1957), Spanish politician
- Alberto Aleman (born c. 1951), Panamanian administrator of the Panama Canal
- Alberto Alemanno (born 1975), Italian academic, author, public interest lawyer, and civic entrepreneur
- Alberto Alén Pérez (1948–2004), Cuban musicologist and cellist
- Alberto Alesina (1957–2020), Italian economist
- Alberto Alessi (1939–2022), Italian lawyer and politician
- Alberto Alfonso, Cuban-American architect
- Alberto Almici (born 1993), Italian footballer
- Alberto Alonso (1917–2007), Cuban dancer and choreographer
- Alberto Altarac, Bosnian footballer
- Alberto Alvarado (footballer) (born 1988), Mexican footballer
- Alberto Alvarado Arámburo (1925–1996), Mexican politician
- Alberto Amaro Corona (born 1963), Mexican politician
- Alberto Amezcua (born 1992), Spanish racewalker
- Alberto Ammann (born 1978), Argentine-Spanish actor
- Alberto Amodeo (born 2000), Italian Paralympic swimmer
- Alberto Anaya (born 1946), Mexican politician and senator
- Alberto Anchart (1931–2011), Argentine actor
- Alberto Anderson (1900–unknown), Argentine rower
- Alberto Andrade (1943–2009), Peruvian lawyer and politician
- Alberto Andressen (1897–unknown), Portuguese sports shooter
- Alberto Angela (born 1962), Italian paleontologist, writer, and journalist
- Alberto Angelini (born 1974), Italian water polo player
- Alberto Angulo (born 1970), Spanish basketball player and coach
- Alberto Antonini (born 1959), Italian oenologist
- Alberto Aparicio (1923–unknown), Bolivian footballer
- Alberto Aquilani (born 1984), Italian footballer and manager
- Alberto Arai (1915–1959), Mexican architect, theorist, and writer
- Alberto Arakaki (born 1972), Brazilian skateboarder
- Alberto Arbasino (1930–2020), Italian writer, essayist, and politician
- Alberto Ardines (born 1970), Spanish musician
- Alberto Areces (born 1970), Spanish sports shooter
- Alberto Arellano (born 1967), Mexican football goalkeeper and manager
- Alberto Arenas (born 1965), Chilean economist, academic, and politician
- Alberto Arévalo (born 1995), Spanish diver
- Alberto Argañaraz (born 1992), Argentine footballer
- Alberto Argibay (1932–2007), Argentine actor
- Alberto Arilla (1937–2021), Spanish tennis player
- Alberto Armando (1910–1988), Argentine businessman and football manager
- Alberto Armijo (1926–2021), Costa Rican footballer
- Alberto Arnoldi, Italian sculptor and architect
- Alberto Arnone (died 1721), Italian painter
- Alberto Arredondo Gutiérrez (1912–1968), Cuban journalist and economist
- Alberto Arroyo (1916–2010), American runner
- Alberto Artuso (born 1989), Italian footballer
- Alberto Arvelo Torrealba (1905–1971), Venezuelan lawyer, educator, and folklore poet
- Alberto Asarta (born 1951), Spanish military officer and politician
- Alberto Ascari (1918–1955), Italian racing driver
- Alberto Ascoli (1877–1957), Italian serologist, hygienist, and physiological chemist
- Alberto Assa (1909–1996), Colombian educator, translator, and humanist
- Alberto Asseff (born 1942), Argentine lawyer and politician
- Alberto Assirelli (1936–2017), Italian racing cyclist
- Alberto Augusto (1898–1973), Portuguese footballer
- Alberto Aznar (1864–1923), Spanish engineer, businessman, and politician
- Alberto Azoy (died 1952), Cuban baseball manager

=== B ===
- Alberto Babo (born 1947), Portuguese basketball coach
- Alberto Bachelet (1923–1974), Chilean Brigadier General
- Alberto Bacó Bagué, Puerto Rican lawyer
- Alberto Baeza (born 1938), Mexican footballer
- Alberto Baeza Flores (1914–1998), Chilean poet, writer, and journalist
- Alberto Bagnai (born 1962), Italian politician and economist
- Alberto Baillères (1931–2022), Mexican businessman
- Alberto Baldonado (born 1993), Panamanian baseball player
- Alberto Baldrich (1898–1982), Argentine philosopher and sociologist
- Alberto Baldé (born 2002), Spanish footballer
- Alberto Balestrini (fencer) (born 1931), Argentine fencer
- Alberto Balestrini (1947–2017), Argentine politician
- Alberto Baltra (1912–1981), Chilean politician and economist
- Alberto Barazzetta (born 2001), Italian footballer
- Alberto Barbera (born 1950), Italian film critic and film festival curator
- Alberto Barbieri (general) (1882–unknown), Italian Army Corps General
- Alberto Barbieri (wrestler) (1903–unknown), Argentine wrestler
- Alberto Barbieri (academic), Argentine academic
- Alberto Barcel (1907–1975), Argentine actor
- Alberto Bardelli (born 1967), Italian geneticist and cancer researcher
- Alberto Barenghi (1930–2002), Argentine boxer
- Alberto Barison (born 1994), Italian footballer
- Alberto Barrera Tyszka (born 1960), Venezuelan writer
- Alberto Barrera Zurita (born 1973), Mexican politician
- Alberto Barroso Campos (born 1996), Spanish tennis player
- Alberto Barsotti (born 1964), Italian middle-distance runner
- Alberto Barton (1870–1950), Argentine-Peruvian microbiologist
- Alberto Barucco (1906–unknown), Argentine sprinter
- Alberto Basso (born 1931), Italian musicologist and librarian
- Alberto Bastos Lopes (born 1959), Portuguese footballer
- Alberto Batignani (1912–unknown), Uruguayan water polo player
- Alberto Batistoni (born 1945), Italian footballer
- Alberto Bautista Gómez, Mexican potter
- Alberto Bayo (1892–1967), Cuban military commander
- Alberto Bazzoni (1889–1973), Italian sculptor
- Alberto Becerra (born 1979), Mexican football goalkeeper
- Alberto Begné Guerra (born 1963), Mexican politician
- Alberto Beingolea (born 1964), Peruvian politician
- Alberto Belén (1917–unknown), Argentine footballer
- Alberto Belgeri, Italian rower
- Alberto Bellini (born 1987), Italian volleyball player
- Alberto Bello (1897–1963), Argentine actor
- Alberto Beloki (born 1978), Spanish pelotaris
- Alberto Belsué (born 1968), Spanish footballer
- Alberto Beltrán (singer) (1923–1997), Dominican singer
- Alberto Beltrán (1923–2002), Mexican graphic artist and painter
- Alberto Benavides de la Quintana (1920–2014), Peruvian businessman and engineer
- Alberto Beneduce (1877–1944), Italian scientist and economist
- Alberto Benettin (born 1990), Italian rugby union player
- Alberto Benito (footballer, born 1972) (born 1972), Spanish footballer
- Alberto Benito (footballer, born 1992) (born 1992), Spanish footballer
- Alberto Berasategui (born 1973), Spanish tennis player
- Alberto Bertoldi (born 1955), Italian painter
- Alberto Bertuccelli (1924–2002), Italian footballer
- Alberto Bettiol (born 1993), Italian racing cyclist
- Alberto Bevilacqua (1934–2013), Italian writer and filmmaker
- Alberto Bica (1958–2021), Uruguayan footballer
- Alberto Biedermann (born 1926), Argentine track and field athlete
- Alberto Bienvenú (1916–2004), Mexican basketball player
- Alberto Bigon (born 1947), Italian footballer and manager
- Alberto Bimboni (1882–1960), Italian-American composer and conductor
- Alberto Blanc (1835–1904), Italian diplomat and politician
- Alberto Carlo Blanc (1906–1960), Italian paleontologist
- Alberto Blanco (weightlifter) (born 1950), Cuban weightlifter
- Alberto Blanco (poet) (born 1951), Mexican poet
- Alberto Blanco (footballer) (born 1978), Panamanian footballer and coach
- Alberto Blest Gana (1830–1920), Chilean novelist and diplomat
- Alberto Boccianti, Italian art director
- Alberto Boerger (1881–1957), German scientist
- Alberto Boggio (born 1969), Argentine footballer
- Alberto Bolaffi (1874–1944), Italian philatelist and stamp dealer
- Alberto Bollini (born 1966), Italian football manager
- Alberto Bolognetti (1538–1585), Italian law professor, bishop, diplomat, and cardinal
- Alberto Bolzi (1924–2012), Argentine wrestler
- Alberto Bombassei (born 1940), Italian businessman
- Alberto Bona (born 1978), Italian actor, playwright, and film director
- Alberto Bonacossa (1883–1953), Italian tennis player
- Alberto Boniotti (born 1995), Italian footballer
- Alberto Bonisoli (born 1961), Italian politician
- Alberto Bonucci (1918–1969), Italian actor and director
- Alberto Borea, Peruvian lawyer and politician
- Alberto Borgerth (1892–1958), Brazilian rower, footballer, medic, and businessman
- Alberto Borghetti (born 1967), Italian electrical engineer and professor
- Alberto Borin (1940–2023), Belgian teacher and politician
- Alberto Bosch y Fustegueras (1848–1900), Spanish engineer, lawyer, and politician
- Alberto Botía (born 1989), Spanish footballer
- Alberto Bottari de Castello (born 1942), Italian prelate
- Alberto Bottini (born 1967), Swiss swimmer
- Alberto Boullosa (born 1925), Uruguayan boxer
- Alberto Bourdillón (born 1943), Argentine swimmer
- Alberto Bovone (1922–1998), Italian Catholic cardinal
- Alberto Bozzato (1930–2022), Italian rower
- Alberto Braga (1929–2004), Brazilian sports shooter
- Alberto Bragaglia (1896–1985), Italian painter
- Alberto Braglia (1883–1954), Italian gymnast
- Alberto Braniff (1886–1966), Mexican aviation pioneer
- Alberto Breccia (1919–1993), Uruguayan-Argentine artist and cartoonist
- Alberto Breccia Guzzo (1946–2014), Uruguayan politician and lawyer
- Alberto Bremauntz (1936–2006), Mexican wrestler
- Alberto Bressan (born 1956), Italian mathematician
- Alberto Briganti (1896–1997), Italian Regia Aeronautica General
- Alberto Brignoli (born 1991), Italian football goalkeeper
- Alberto Brizzi (born 1984), Italian tennis player
- Alberto Broggi (born 1966), Italian computer engineer
- Alberto Bruttomesso (born 2003), Italian cyclist
- Alberto Bucci (1948–2019), Italian basketball coach
- Alberto Buccicardi (1914–1970), Chilean footballer and manager
- Alberto Buela (born 1946), Argentine philosopher and professor
- Alberto Bueno (born 1988), Spanish footballer
- Alberto Builes (born 1946), Colombian lawyer and politician
- Alberto Burri (1915–1995), Italian visual artist, painter, sculptor, and physician
- Alberto Busnari (born 1978), Italian artistic gymnast
- Alberto Bustamante Belaúnde (1950–2008), Peruvian politician, Prime Minister of Peru from 1999–2000
- Alberto Bustani Adem (born 1954), Mexican engineer
- Alberto Byington (1902–1964), Brazilian athlete, industrialist, and filmmaker

=== C ===
- Alberto Caballero (born 1973), Spanish television director, screenwriter, and producer
- Alberto Caballero (astronomer) (born 1991), Spanish astronomer and science communicator
- Alberto Cabero (1874–1955), Chilean politician
- Alberto Cabrera (baseball) (born 1988), American major league baseball pitcher
- Alberto Cairo (physiotherapist) (born 1952), Italian physiotherapist and humanitarian
- Alberto Cairo (born 1974), Spanish digital artist and professor
- Alberto Calderón (1920–1998), Argentine mathematician
- Alberto Călin (born 2005), Romanian footballer
- Alberto Callaspo (born 1983), Venezuelan major league baseball player
- Alberto Camargo (cyclist) (born 1967), Colombian racing cyclist
- Alberto Cambrosio, Canadian sociologist
- Alberto Camenzind (1914–2004), Swiss architect
- Alberto Camerini (born 1951), Italian singer-songwriter and musician
- Alberto Campbell-Staines (born 1993), Australian athlete with an intellectual disability
- Alberto Campo Baeza (born 1946), Spanish architect and professor
- Alberto Campolongo (1912–unknown), Italian chess player
- Alberto Canal (born 1961), Spanish water polo player
- Alberto Canapino (1963–2021), Argentine racing car preparer
- Alberto Cañas Escalante (1920–2014), Costa Rican politician, writer, public servant, and journalist
- Alberto Candeau (1910–1990), Uruguayan actor and writer
- Alberto Canlas (born 1940), Filipino weightlifter
- Alberto Cantù (1950–2021), Italian musicologist and musical critic
- Alberto Capilla (1926–2003), Mexican diver
- Alberto Capitta (born 1954), Italian writer
- Alberto Capozzi (1886–1945), Italian film actor
- Alberto Caracciolo (1918–1994), Argentine tango musician, musical arranger, orchestra director, composer, and bandoneon player
- Alberto Caramella (1928–2007), Italian poet
- Alberto Carbonell (born 1993), Spanish footballer
- Alberto Cardaccio (1949–2015), Uruguayan footballer
- Alberto Cardelle (born 1964), American educator and academic
- Alberto Cardemil (born 1945), Chilean politician
- Alberto Cárdenas (born 1958), Mexican politician
- Alberto Cardone (1920–1977), Italian film director, screenwriter, and film editor
- Alberto Cardoso (1906–unknown), Portuguese footballer
- Alberto Cardín (1948–1992), Spanish essayist and anthropologist
- Alberto Carelli (born 1944), Italian footballer
- Alberto Cargnin (1925–2007), Brazilian writer and journalist
- Alberto Carlieri (1672– after 1720), Italian painter
- Alberto Carlos (born 1967), Philippine Navy vice admiral
- Alberto Carmona (born 1961), Venezuelan equestrian
- Alberto Carneiro (1937–2017), Portuguese artist
- Alberto Carneroli (1943–2016), Italian sport shooter
- Alberto Caro (born 1937), Venezuelan chess player
- Alberto Carpani (1956–2020), Italian singer
- Alberto Carpinteri (born 1952), Italian physicist and academic
- Alberto Carrasquilla Barrera (born 1959), Colombian politician
- Alberto Carrillo Armenta (born 1954), Mexican politician
- Alberto Casado Cerviño (born 1952), Spanish businessman
- Alberto Casañal Shakery (1875–1943), Spanish poet, playwright, humorist, and writer
- Alberto Cassano (1935–2014), Argentine engineer and academic
- Alberto Castagna (1945–2005), Italian television presenter and journalist
- Alberto Castagnetti (1943–2009), Italian swimmer and swimming coach
- Alberto Castelvecchi (born 1962), Italian linguist, publisher, and professor
- Alberto Castilla (1878–1937), Colombian composer, engineer, journalist, poet, writer, mathematician, and musician
- Alberto Castillo (performer) (1914–2002), Argentine tango singer and actor
- Alberto Castillo (catcher) (born 1970), Dominican major league baseball catcher
- Alberto Castillo (pitcher) (born 1975), Cuban major league baseball pitcher
- Alberto Cattaneo (born 1967), Italian mathematician and physicist
- Alberto Cavaciocchi (1862–1925), Italian Army general and military historian
- Alberto Cavalcanti (1897–1982), Brazilian film director and producer
- Alberto Cavallari (1927–1998), Italian journalist and writer
- Alberto Cavallero (1900–1968), Italian long-distance runner
- Alberto Cavallone (1938–1997), Italian film director and screenwriter
- Alberto Cavasin (born 1956), Italian footballer and manager
- Alberto Cavos (1801–1863), Russian-Italian architect
- Alberto Cayarga (born 1996), Spanish footballer
- Alberto Cecchi (born 1943), Italian rower
- Alberto Cecchin (born 1989), Italian racing cyclist
- Alberto Cerioni (1919–1948), Argentine footballer
- Alberto Cerqui (born 1992), Italian racing driver
- Alberto Cerreti (1939–2019), Italian politician, Mayor of Sorano, Tuscany from 1972–1980
- Alberto Cerri (born 1996), Italian footballer
- Alberto Chaíça (born 1973), Portuguese long-distance runner
- Alberto Chedrani (born 1957), Honduran businessman and politician
- Alberto Cheli (born 1951), Italian singer-songwriter and composer
- Alberto Chiancone (1904–1988), Italian painter
- Alberto Chicote (born 1969), Spanish chef, restaurateur, and television host
- Alberto Chiesa (born 1988), Italian rugby player
- Alberto Chillon (born 1990), Italian rugby union player
- Alberto Chimal (born 1970), Mexican writer
- Alberto Chipande (born 1939), Mozambican politician
- Alberto Chissano (1935–1994), Mozambican sculptor
- Alberto Chividini (1907–1961), Argentine footballer
- Alberto Cianca (1884–1966), Italian journalist and politician
- Alberto Ciaramella (born 1947), Italian computer engineer and scientist
- Alberto Cifuentes (born 1979), Spanish football goalkeeper and manager
- Alberto Cinta, Mexican economist, entrepreneur, and politician
- Alberto Cirio (born 1972), Italian politician
- Alberto Cisolla (born 1977), Italian volleyball player
- Alberto Ciurana (1960–2021), Mexican television executive
- Alberto Clò (born 1947), Italian businessman and politician
- Alberto Closas (1921–1994), Spanish actor
- Alberto Cobo (born 1984), Spanish footballer
- Alberto Cobos, Spanish paleontologist
- Alberto Cobrea (born 1990), Romanian football goalkeeper
- Alberto Coelho (boxer) (born 1961), Angolan boxer
- Alberto Alves Coelho (born 1993), Portuguese footballer
- Alberto Colajanni (born 1973), Italian boxer
- Alberto Coletti Conti (1885–1957), Italian sports shooter
- Alberto Collino (1947–2020), Italian mathematician
- Alberto Collo (1883–1955), Italian actor
- Alberto Colombo (composer) (1888–1954), American film composer and music director
- Alberto Colombo (racing driver) (1946–2024), Italian racing driver
- Alberto Colunga Cueto (1879–1962), Spanish Dominican priest and translator
- Alberto Comazzi (born 1979), Italian footballer
- Alberto Conde (born c. 1960), Galician jazz pianist and composer
- Alberto Conrad (1910–unknown), Bolivian swimmer
- Alberto Contador (born 1982), Spanish cyclist
- Alberto Conti (born 1966), Italian astrophysicist
- Alberto Contini (born 1965), Italian musician
- Alberto Contrera (born 1992), Paraguayan footballer
- Alberto Contreras (died 1958), Spanish-Argentine actor
- Alberto Cooper (1928–2023), Chilean politician
- Alberto Coramini (1944–2015), Italian footballer
- Alberto Corazón (1942–2021), Spanish artist
- Alberto Corbacho (born 1984), Spanish basketball player
- Alberto Coronado Quintanilla (born 1963), Mexican politician
- Alberto Cortez (1940–2019), Argentine singer and songwriter
- Alberto Cortina (born 1947), Spanish businessman
- Alberto Corvo (born 1963), Italian middle-distance runner
- Alberto Cossentino (born 1988), Italian footballer
- Alberto Costa (Portuguese politician) (born 1947), Portuguese politician, Minister of Justice from 2005–2009
- Alberto Costa (British politician) (born 1971), British politician
- Alberto Coto García (born 1970), Spanish mental calculator and accountant
- Alberto Couriel (born 1935), Uruguayan public accountant and politician
- Alberto Coutinho (born 1969), American congressman from New Jersey
- Alberto Cova (born 1958), Italian long-distance runner
- Alberto Covarrubias (born 1994), Mexican track cyclist
- Alberto Coyote (born 1967), Mexican footballer and manager
- Alberto Cozer (born 1981), Brazilian systems engineer, writer and speaker
- Alberto Crane (born 1976), American mixed martial artist, submission grappler, and Brazilian Jiu-Jitsu instructor
- Alberto Crescenti (born 1953), Argentine medical doctor
- Alberto Crespo (1920–1991), Argentine racing driver
- Alberto Croce (born 1944), Italian golfer
- Alberto Cruz (soccer) (born 1971), American soccer player
- Alberto Cruz (racewalker) (born 1972), Mexican racewalker
- Alberto Cruz Montt (1879–1955), Chilean architect and professor
- Alberto Cuba (born 1962), Cuban marathon runner
- Alberto Cuello (1909–unknown), Argentine footballer
- Alberto Curamil (born c. 1974), Chilean activist
- Alberto Curi Naime (born 1956), Mexican politician
- Alberto Curtolo (born 1984), Italian road cyclist
- Alberto Cutié (born 1969), Cuban-American Episcopal priest

=== D ===
- Alberto D'Aversa (1920–1969), Italian film and theatre director
- Alberto da Bergamo (1214–1279), Italian Catholic farmer
- Alberto da Costa e Silva (1931–2023), Brazilian historian, poet, and diplomat
- Alberto Da Rin (born 1939), Italian ice hockey player
- Alberto da Veiga Guignard (1896–1962), Brazilian painter
- Alberto da Zara (1889–1951), Italian Regia Marina admiral
- Alberto Dadie (born 2002), Spanish footballer
- Alberto Dahik (born 1953), Ecuadorian politician
- Alberto Dainese (born 1998), Italian cyclist
- Alberto Dalbés (1922–1983), Argentine film and television actor
- Alberto David (born 1970), Luxembourgish-Italian chess grandmaster
- Alberto Dávila (born 1954), American boxer
- Alberto De Agazio (1888–1943), Italian general
- Alberto de Angelis (1885–1965), Italian historian and musicologist
- Alberto de Belaúnde (born 1986), Peruvian lawyer, LGBT activist, and politician
- Alberto de Carvalho (born 1956), Angolan-Portuguese basketball coach
- Alberto De Francesco (born 1994), Italian footballer
- Alberto de Lacerda (1928–2007), Portuguese poet and radio presenter
- Alberto De Marchi (born 1986), Italian rugby union player
- Alberto De Martino (1929–2015), Italian film director and screenwriter
- Alberto de Mendoza (1923–2011), Argentine actor
- Alberto de Meneses Rodrigues (1904–1971), Indian writer and poet
- Alberto de Noronha (1920–2006), Indian writer and translator
- Alberto de Oliveira (1857–1937), Brazilian poet, pharmacist, and professor
- Alberto De Rossi (born 1957), Italian footballer and manager
- Alberto de Simoni (1740–1822), Italian lawyer and jurist
- Alberto Luiz de Souza (born 1975), Brazilian footballer
- Alberto de' Stefani (1879–1969), Italian politician and economist
- Alberto de Zavalía (1911–1988), Argentine film director and producer
- Alberto de la Bella (born 1985), Spanish footballer
- Alberto de la Campa y Roff (1918–1964), Cuban diplomat
- Alberto de las Casas (died 1544), Spanish preacher
- Alberto del Bono (1856–1932) (1856–1932), Italian admiral and politician
- Alberto del Bono, Italian tennis player
- Alberto del Canto (c. 1547–1611), Portuguese noble and soldier
- Alberto Del Guerra, Italian engineer
- Alberto del Moral (born 2000), Spanish footballer
- Alberto Del Nero (1918–1986), Italian politician
- Alberto Del Rio (born 1977), Mexican-American wrestler, sports commentator, and mixed martial artist
- Alberto del Rio Chaviano (1914–1978), Cuban brigadier general
- Alberto del Saz, Spanish ice skater
- Alberto Delgado (jockey) (born 1964), American jockey
- Alberto Delgado (Cuban footballer) (born 1978), Cuban footballer
- Alberto Delgado (Spanish footballer) (born 1991), Spanish footballer
- Alberto Dell'Acqua (born 1938), Italian actor and stuntman
- Alberto Della Beffa (1914–1969), Italian bobsledder
- Alberto della Marmora (1789–1863), Italian soldier and naturalist
- Alberto Demicheli (1896–1980), Uruguayan politician, lawyer, historian, journalist, pilot, and military officer
- Alberto Demiddi (1944–2000), Argentine rower
- Alberto Denegri (1906–1973), Peruvian footballer
- Alberto Denti di Pirajno (1886–1968), Italian writer, medical doctor, and gastronome
- Alberto Desiderio (born 1973), Italian javelin thrower
- Alberto Di Bernardo (born 1980), Italian-Argentine rugby union player
- Alberto Di Chiara (born 1964), Italian footballer
- Alberto Diamante (born 1970), Italian-Canadian film producer
- Alberto Diaspro (born 1959), Italian scientist
- Alberto Díaz (born 1994), Spanish basketball player
- Alberto Díaz Jr. (born 1943), Puerto Rican United States Navy rear admiral
- Alberto Díaz Trujillo (born 1975), Mexican politician and lawyer
- Alberto Álvarez Díaz (1937–1958), Cuban guerrilla
- Alberto Diena (1894–1977), Italian stamp historian
- Alberto Dines (1932–2018), Brazilian journalist and writer
- Alberto Disera (born 1942), Argentine field hockey player
- Alberto Domingo, Spanish engineer
- Alberto Domínguez (composer) (1913–1975), Mexican composer and marimbaist
- Alberto Domínguez (cyclist) (1934–2001), Uruguayan-Australian cyclist, victim of the American Airlines Flight 11 hijacking
- Alberto Domínguez (rower) (born 1978), Spanish rower
- Alberto Domínguez (footballer) (born 1988), Spanish football goalkeeper
- Alberto Dossena (born 1998), Italian footballer
- Alberto Dou Mas de Xaxàs (1915–2009), Spanish Jesuit and mathematician
- Alberto Downey (1890–unknown), Chilean cyclist
- Alberto Drago (died 1601), Italian Roman Catholic prelate
- Alberto Dualib (1919–2021), Brazilian businessman and football executive
- Alberto Duñabeitia (1900–1980), Spanish footballer

=== E ===
- Alberto Edjogo-Owono (born 1984), Equatoguinean footballer
- Alberto Edwards (1874–1932), Chilean historian, politician, and lawyer
- Alberto Egea (1901–1958), Venezuelan artist
- Alberto Eliani (1922–2009), Italian footballer and manager
- Alberto Elli (born 1964), Italian road racing cyclist
- Alberto Enríquez Gallo (1894–1962), Ecuadorian politician, President of Ecuador from 1937–1938
- Alberto Entrerríos (born 1976), Spanish handball player
- Alberto Erede (1909–2001), Italian conductor
- Alberto Errecalde (1890–unknown), Argentine rower
- Alberto Errera (1913–1944), Greek-Jewish officer and anti-Nazi resistance member
- Alberto Escassi (born 1989), Spanish footballer
- Alberto Escobar (born 1947), Colombian footballer
- Alberto Escoto (born 1925), Cuban basketball player
- Alberto Espina (born 1956), Chilean lawyer and politician
- Alberto Espínola (born 1991), Paraguayan footballer
- Alberto Espinosa Desigaud, Mexican businessman
- Alberto Espinoza Barrón, Mexican drug trafficker
- Alberto Esquer Gutiérrez (born 1978), Mexican politician
- Alberto Estella Goytre (1940–2022), Spanish politician
- Alberto Esteva Salinas (born 1964), Mexican politician
- Alberto Estima de Oliveira (1934–2008), Portuguese poet
- Alberto Estrella (born 1962), Mexican actor
- Alberto Etchebehere (1903–1965), Argentine cinematographer
- Alberto Etchegaray Aubry (born 1945), Chilean politician
- Alberto Ezcurra Medrano (1909–1982), Argentine historian and nationalist activist

=== F ===
- Alberto Fabra (born 1964), Spanish politician, President of the Valencian Government from 2011–2015
- Alberto Fait Lizano (1929–1997), Costa Rican politician, Vice President of Costa Rica from 1982–1986
- Alberto Falcón (born 1970), Spanish fencer
- Alberto Fanesi (born 1948), Argentine footballer and manager
- Alberto Farnese (1926–1996), Italian actor
- Alberto Fassini (1875–1942), Italian businessman and film producer
- Alberto Favara (1863–1923), Italian ethnomusicologist
- Alberto Fay (born 1949), Uruguayan football goalkeeper
- Alberto Faya (born 1944), Cuban singer, researcher, composer, and music professor
- Alberto Febbrajo (born 1944), Italian legal scholar and sociologist
- Alberto Felice De Toni (born 1955), Italian professor, engineer, and politician
- Alberto Félix (footballer) (born 1966), Brazilian football coach and former player
- Alberto Félix (pentathlete) (born 1969), Mexican pentathlete
- Alberto Fermín Zubiría (1901–1971), Uruguayan politician
- Alberto Fernández (basketball) (born c. 1926), Peruvian basketball player
- Alberto Fernández (footballer, born 1943) (born 1943), Spanish footballer
- Alberto Fernández (cyclist) (1955–1984), Spanish road racing cyclist
- Alberto Fernandez (diplomat) (born 1958), Cuban-American diplomat
- Alberto Fernández (born 1959), Argentine politician, lawyer, and academic, President of Argentina from 2019–2023
- Alberto Fernández (sport shooter) (born 1983), Spanish sports shooter
- Alberto Fernández (footballer, born 1999) (born 1999), Spanish footballer
- Alberto Elmore Fernández de Córdoba (1844–1916), Peruvian lawyer, diplomat, and politician
- Alberto Fernández de Rosa (born 1944), Argentine actor
- Alberto Fernández de la Puebla (born 1984), Spanish road racing cyclist
- Alberto Fernández Díaz (born 1961), Spanish politician
- Alberto Fernández Sainz (born 1981), Spanish cyclist
- Alberto Ferrero (general) (1885–1969), Italian Army general
- Alberto Ferrero (footballer) (born 1944), Uruguayan-Chilean footballer
- Alberto Festa (1939–2024), Portuguese footballer
- Alberto Arturo Figueroa Morales (born 1961), Puerto Rican Catholic prelate
- Alberto Filippini (born 1987), Italian footballer
- Alberto Fiumicetti (born 2000), Italian footballer
- Alberto Flores (born 2003), Spanish football goalkeeper
- Alberto Flores Galindo (1949–1990), Peruvian historian, social scientist, and essayist
- Alberto Foà (born 1957), Italian businessman
- Alberto Foguelman (1923–2013), Argentine chess master
- Alberto Fonseca (born 1956), Portuguese footballer
- Alberto Fontana (painter) (died 1558), Italian painter
- Alberto Fontana (footballer, born 1967) (born 1967), Italian football goalkeeper
- Alberto Fontana (footballer, born 1974) (born 1974), Italian football goalkeeper
- Alberto Fontanesi (1929–2016), Italian footballer
- Alberto Forato (born 2000), Italian Motocross racer
- Alberto Forelli (born 1946), Argentine swimmer
- Alberto Fortes (born 1958), Spanish author and chef
- Alberto Fortis (1741–1803), Italian writer, naturalist, and cartographer
- Alberto Fortis (musician) (born 1955), Italian musician and songwriter
- Alberto Fouillioux (1940–2018), Chilean footballer
- Alberto Fraga (born 1956), Brazilian police colonel
- Alberto Franceschi (born 1947), Venezuelan politician and businessman
- Alberto Franceschini (born 1947), Italian terrorist
- Alberto Franchetti (1860–1942), Italian composer and racing driver
- Alberto Francini (born 1958), Sammarinese judoka
- Alberto Francisco Ngalanela, Angolan politician
- Alberto dos Santos Franco (1913–2011), Brazilian officer
- Alberto Frezza (born 1989), Italian-American actor and director
- Alberto Frison (born 1988), Italian football goalkeeper
- Alberto Fuentes Mohr (1927–1979), Guatemalan economist and politician
- Alberto Fuguet (born 1963), Chilean author, journalist, film critic, and film director
- Alberto Fujimori (1938–2024), Peruvian politician, professor, engineer, President of Peru from 1990–2000

=== G ===
- Alberto García (athlete) (born 1971), Spanish long-distance and cross-country runner
- Alberto Giacometti (1901–1966), Swiss sculptor, painter, draughtsman, and printmaker
- Alberto Gianni (1891–1930), Italian underwater diver
- Alberto Gilardino (born 1982), Italian footballer
- Alberto Ginastera (1916–1983), Argentine composer
- Alberto Giurioli (born 1991), Italian pianist and composer
- Alberto Gonzales (born 1955), American politician
- Alberto González (baseball) (born 1983), Venezuelan baseball player
- Alberto González (Chilean footballer) (born 1980)
- Alberto Grimaldi (1925–2021), Italian film producer
- Alberto Arredondo Gutiérrez (1912–1968), Cuban journalist and economist
- Alberto B. Gutiérrez, Cristero officer
- Alberto Del Guerra, Italian scientist

=== J ===
- Alberto Jiménez-Becerril (1960–1998), Spanish politician
- Alberto Juantorena (born 1950), Cuban runner

=== L ===
- Alberto Amador Leal (1951–2020), Mexican politician
- Alberto Loddo (born 1979), former Italian cyclist
- Alberto Carlo Lolli (c. 1876–unknown), Italian silent film director
- Alberto Lopo (born 1980), footballer
- Alberto Lora (born 1987), Spanish footballer
- Alberto Losada (born 1982), Spanish cyclist
- Alberto Luconi (born 1983), Italian-American clarinetist and instructor

=== M ===
- Alberto Magnelli, Italian artist
- Alberto Mantelli (1909–1967), Italian musicologist and music critic
- Alberto Martín (born 1978), Spanish tennis player
- Alberto Martínez (footballer, born 1950) (1950–2009), Uruguayan footballer
- Alberto Martínez Díaz (born 1962), Spanish footballer
- Alberto Miguel (born 1977), Spanish basketball player
- Alberto Milian (born 1960), American lawyer and judge
- Alberto Mondi (born 1984), Italian television personality and businessman active in South Korea
- Alberto Montejo (born 1988), Spanish footballer
- Alberto Moreno, Spanish footballer

=== N ===
- Alberto Nadra (born 1952), Argentine politician, writer and journalist
- Alberto Naranjo (1941–2020), Venezuelan musician
- Alberto A. Nido (1919–1991), American United States Air Force officer

=== O ===
- Alberto Oliart (1928–2021), Spanish politician
- Alberto Rodríguez Oliver (born 1982), Spanish road racing cyclist

=== P ===
- Alberto Tarradas Paneque (born 1996), Spanish politician
- Alberto Palatchi, Spanish billionaire
- Alberto Pappafava (1832–1929), Italian painter
- Alberto Pappiani (1709–1790), Italian mathematician, astronomer, and theologian
- Alberto Paulino, Angolan politician
- Alberto Jarabo Payá (1928–2016), Spanish lawyer and politician
- Alberto Peláez (born 1964), Spanish war journalist, writer and correspondent
- Alberto Antonio Peña Jr. (1917–2006), American civil rights activist
- Alberto Peral (born 1966), Basque artist
- Alberto A. Picó (1918–2003), Puerto Rican military officer
- Alberto Martinez Piedra (1926–2021), Cuban-American professor
- Alberto Priori, Italian neurologist, academic, and author
- Alberto Pullicino (1719–1759), Maltese painter

=== R ===
- Alberto Federico Ravell (born 1946), Venezuelan journalist and businessman
- Alberto Marcos Rey (born 1969), Spanish footballer
- Alberto Del Rio (born 1977), Mexican wrestler
- Alberto Rivera (activist), American and anti-Catholic publisher
- Alberto Armando Romero Rodríguez, Salvadoran politician
- Alberto Romualdez, Filipino politician and doctor
- Alberto Asor Rosa (1933–2022), Italian literary critic, historian, and politician

=== S ===
- Alberto Salazar (born 1958), American track coach and long-distance runner
- Alberto Santos-Dumont, (1873–1932), Brazilian aviation pioneer
- Alberto de Simoni (1740–1822), Italian lawyer and journalist
- Alberto Simonini (1896–1960), Italian politician
- Alberto Sordi (1920–2003), Italian actor

=== T ===
- Alberto Carlos Taquini (1905–1998), Argentine cardiologist
- Alberto Tomba (born 1966), Italian skier

=== U ===
- Alberto Ulloa (1950–2011), Dominican painter, sculptor, and poet

=== V ===
- Alberto G. Valdeavellano (1861–1928), Guatemalan photographer
- Alberto van Klaveren (born 1948), Dutch-born Chilean diplomat and lawyer
- Alberto A. Villavert (1903–1984), Filipino politician

=== Y ===
- Alberto Yarini (1882–1910), Cuban pimp

=== Z ===
- Alberto Zalamea Costa (1929–2011), Colombian journalist, politician, and diplomat
- Alberto Zedda (1928–2017), Italian conductor

== As a surname ==
- Dominik Alberto (born 1992), Swiss pole vaulter and decathlete
- Hanser Alberto (born 1992), Dominican baseball player
- Julio Alberto (born 1958), Spanish football player
- Lourdes Alberto, Curaçaoan politician
- Luis Alberto (disambiguation), multiple people
- Luiz Alberto (disambiguation), multiple people
- Madalena Alberto, Portuguese actress, singer, and composer
- Yuri Alberto (born 2001), Brazilian footballer

== Fictional characters ==
- Alberto Bertorelli, a character in the BBC sitcom 'Allo 'Allo!
- Alberto Falcone, a DC Comics villain
- Alberto Molina, from the TV series Arthur
- Alberto Scorfano, A character in Disney Pixar movie Luca

== See also ==
- Albert (given name)
- Albert (surname)
- Albertus (given name)
- Adalberto
- Albertet, an Occitan diminutive of Albert
- Adalbert (name)
- Berto (disambiguation)
- Carlos Alberto (disambiguation)
