= Cerioni =

Cerioni is an Italian surname that may refer to:

- Alberto Cerioni (1919–1948), Argentine football player
- Carlo Cerioni (1925–2009), Italian basketball player and coach
- Mauro Cerioni (born 1948), Italian basketball player
- Rubí Cerioni (1927–2012), Argentine football player
- Stefano Cerioni (born 1964), Italian foil fencer
