= Montejo =

Montejo may also refer to:

== Places ==
- Montejo, Salamanca, a municipality located in the province of Salamanca, Castile and León, Spain

== People ==
- Alberto Montejo (born 1988), Spanish footballer
- Andrés Llinás Montejo (born 1997), Colombian professional footballer
- Carmen Montejo (1925–2013), Cuban and Mexican actress
- Consuelo Salgar de Montejo (1928–2002), Colombian journalist, advertising executive, media entrepreneur, and politician
- Dorothy Montejo-Gonzaga, Filipino politician who has been the governor of Davao de Oro since 2022
- Eduardo Santos Montejo (1888–1974), leading Colombian publisher and politician
- Esteban Montejo (1868–1973), Cuban enslaved person who escaped to freedom
- Eugenio Montejo (1938–2008), Venezuelan poet and essay writer
- Francisco de Montejo (1479–1553), Spanish conquistador in Mexico and Central America
- Francisco de Montejo the Younger (1508–1565), Spanish conquistador
- Francisco de Montejo (the Nephew) (1514–1572), Spanish conquistador
- Ferdinand de Montejo, a member of the anti-Castro paramilitary organization Alpha 66
- Mario Montejo, Filipino engineer and government administrator
