= Armenta =

Armenta is a surname. Notable people with the surname include:

- Alberto Carrillo Armenta (born 1954), Mexican politician
- Ceci Flores Armenta, Mexican missing persons activist
- Eduardo Armenta (born 2001), Mexican footballer
- Francisco Arce Armenta (born 1981), Mexican boxer
