= Arnone =

Arnone is an Italian surname. Notable people with the surname include:

- Alberto Arnone (died 1721), Italian painter
- John Arnone, American set designer
- Lee Arnone-Briggs, American actress
- Lorenzo Arnone Sipari (born 1973), Italian nature writer
- Matthew Arnone (born 1994), Canadian soccer player
- Michael Arnone (1932–2024), American politician
- Tyler Arnone (born 1991), American soccer player

== Other ==
- Cancello e Arnone, municipality in Italy
