= Ascoli =

Ascoli may refer to:

== Places in Italy ==
- Ascoli Satriano, a town and comune in the province of Foggia in the Apulia region
- Province of Ascoli Piceno, a province of the Marche region
  - Ascoli Piceno, a city which is the seat of the province above
  - Porto d'Ascoli, a civil parish in the province above
  - Roman Catholic Diocese of Ascoli Piceno,

== People ==
- Alberto Ascoli (1877–1957), Italian medical researcher
- Conrad of Ascoli (1234–1289), Italian Friar Minor and missionary
- Enoch of Ascoli (c. 1400–c. 1457), Italian manuscript collector
- Giulio Ascoli (1843–1896), Italian mathematician
- Graziadio Isaia Ascoli (1829–1907), Italian linguist
- Guido Ascoli (1887–1957), Italian mathematician
- Max Ascoli (1898–1978), Italian-American professor of political philosophy and law
- Nicola Ascoli (born 1979), Italian football player

== Other uses ==
- Ascoli Calcio 1898, a football club based in Ascoli Piceno
- Ascoli Piceno railway station
