= Rubí Cerioni =

Argentine footballer and manager

Personal information
- Full name: Rubí Orlando Cerioni
- Date of birth: 1 May 1927
- Place of birth: La Plata, Argentina
- Date of death: 17 March 2012 (aged 84)
- Place of death: La Plata, Argentina
- Position: Forward

Senior career*
| Years | Team | Apps | (Gls) |
| 1948–1949 | River Plate | 2 | (0) |
| 1949–1950 | Quilmes | | |
| 1951–1952 | Sporting de Barranquilla | 17 | (14) |
| 1952–1954 | Deportivo Cali | 47 | (29) |
| 1954–1956 | Quilmes | | |
| 1957–1959 | Atlas | | |
| 1960 | Toronto Roma | | |
| 1961 | O'Higgins | | |
| 1962–1964 | Toronto Roma | | |

Managerial career
- 1964: Toronto Roma
- * Club domestic league appearances and goals

Rubí Orlando Cerioni (1 May 1927 – 17 March 2012) was an Argentine footballer who played professionally in the Argentine Primera División, Fútbol Profesional Colombiano, Mexican Primera División, Chilean Primera División and Canadian National Soccer League.

== Career ==
Born in La Plata, Cerioni played as a forward. He began his career with the youth side of Gimnasia de La Plata. He made two Primera División appearances for River Plate, before joining Argentine Primera B Nacional side Quilmes in 1949. Cerioni quickly became a part of the squad and helped Quilmes win the 1949 title. Over his two stints with the club, he scored 59 goals in 102 Primera and Primera B appearances for Quilmes.

In 1951, Cerioni moved to Colombia to play for Sporting de Barranquilla and Deportivo Cali. He returned to Quilmes, and spells with Atlas, Toronto Roma and O'Higgins followed before he retired in 1962.

== Managerial career ==
Cerioni served as a play-coach in 1964 for Toronto Roma in the Eastern Canada Professional Soccer League.

== Personal life ==
His brothers Enrique, Alberto and Héctor also were footballers who played for Gimnasia La Plata.

Cerioni died in March 2012.
