= Alberto de Meneses Rodrigues =

Indian writer

Alberto de Meneses Rodrigues (1904–1971) was a Goan writer.

== Works ==
- Arroios: poesias (Goa: Tipografia Sadananda, 1954), poems
- Caminhos de luz: novelas (Bastora, Goa: Tipografia Rangel, 1958), three novellas
- A água do oásis: poemas (Bastora: Tipografia Rangel, 1964), poems
- Flor campestre: contos e novelas (Goa: Tipografia Rangel, 1968), a collection of short stories and novellas
- 'Insónia', 'Estiagem', 'Uma lágrima caiu sobre a fulva areia', in A literatura indo-portuguesa: antologia, ed. by Vimala Devi and Manuel de Seabra (Lisboa: Junta de Investigações do Ultramar, 1971), II, 361-64
