= Alberto Cantù =

Italian musicologist and musical critic (1950–2021)

- Born: 1950; Genoa, Italy
- Died: 18 January 2021 (aged 70–71); Milan, Italy
- Occupations: Musicologist; Musical Critic

Alberto Cantù (1950 – 18 January 2021) was an Italian musicologist and musical critic. He studied music history at the Conservatorio di Como and was a musical critic for Giornale from 1976 to 2006. He was a member of the Istituto di studi paganiniani in Genoa, the Istituto di studi pucciniani in Milan, and the Centro studi Felice Romani in Moneglia.

== Works ==
- I 24 capricci e i 6 concerti di Paganini (1980)
- Le opere di Paganini (1982)
- Respighi compositore (1985)
- Ottorino Respighi (1985)
- Invito all'ascolto di Paganini (1988)
- La lanterna magica (1991)
- Renato De Barbieri nell'arco del violino (1993)
- Intorno a Locatelli (1996)
- Melodrammi con figure (2001)
- Da Farinelli a Camilleri (2003)
- Yehudi Menuhin l'Orfeo tragico (2006)
- Jascha Heifetz l'Imperatore solo (2007)
- L'universo di Puccini da Le Villi a Turandot (2008)
- David Oistrakh. Lo splendore della coerenza (2009)
- Ermanno Wolf-Ferrari. La musica, la grazia, il silenzio (2012)
