= Alberto Breccia Guzzo =

Uruguayan politician and lawyer

Alberto Breccia Guzzo (3 July 1946 – 1 December 2014) was a Uruguayan politician and lawyer. He served in the Chamber of Deputies of Uruguay representing the Broad Front party. Breccia was born in Montevideo, Uruguay.

Breccia died in Montevideo, Uruguay, aged 68.
