= Alberto Coletti Conti =

Italian sports shooter

Personal information
- Born: 30 December 1885 Anagni, Italy
- Died: 30 March 1957 (aged 71)

Sport
- Sport: Sports shooting

Alberto Coletti Conti (30 December 1885 – 30 March 1957) was an Italian sports shooter. He competed in two events at the 1924 Summer Olympics.
