= Alberto Canal =

Spanish water polo player (born 1961)

Personal information
- Full name: Alberto Canal Monrós; Alberto Canal Chonros
- Born: 12 October 1961 (age 64) Barcelona, Spain

Sport
- Country: Spain
- Sport: Water polo
Medal record
Representing Spain
European Championships
| Bronze medal – third place | 1983 Rome | Team competition |

Alberto Canal Monrós (Note: In this Spanish name, the first or paternal surname is Canal and the second or maternal family name is Monrós.) (born 12 October 1961), also known as Alberto Canal Chonros and commonly known as Alberto Canal, is a Spanish water polo player. He placed fourth in the men's tournament at the 1984 Summer Olympics.
