= Alberto Rodríguez Oliver =

Spanish cyclist (born 1982)

Alberto Rodríguez
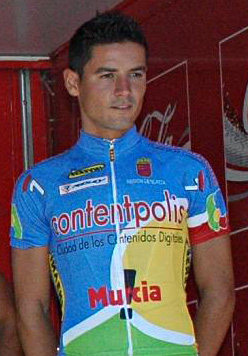
- Rodríguez in 2008

Personal information
- Full name: Alberto Rodríguez Oliver
- Born: 26 August 1982 (age 44)

Cycling career
- Sport: Cycling
- Current team: Retired
- Discipline: Road
- Role: Rider

Amateur teams
- 2001: Iberdrola–Loina
- 2002–2003: Würth–ONCE

Professional teams
- 2004: Saunier Duval–Prodir (stagiaire)
- 2005–2006: Catalunya–Ángel Mir
- 2007: Viña Magna–Cropu
- 2008: Contentpolis–Murcia

Alberto Rodríguez Oliver (born 26 August 1982 in Santa Coloma de Gramenet) is a Spanish former professional road racing cyclist. He is the younger brother of fellow cyclist Joaquim Rodríguez.

== Major results ==
1999
1st Stage 4 Vuelta al Besaya
2006
2nd GP Villafranca de Ordizia
5th Overall Paris–Corrèze
9th Grand Prix Cristal Energie
