= Alberto de Simoni =

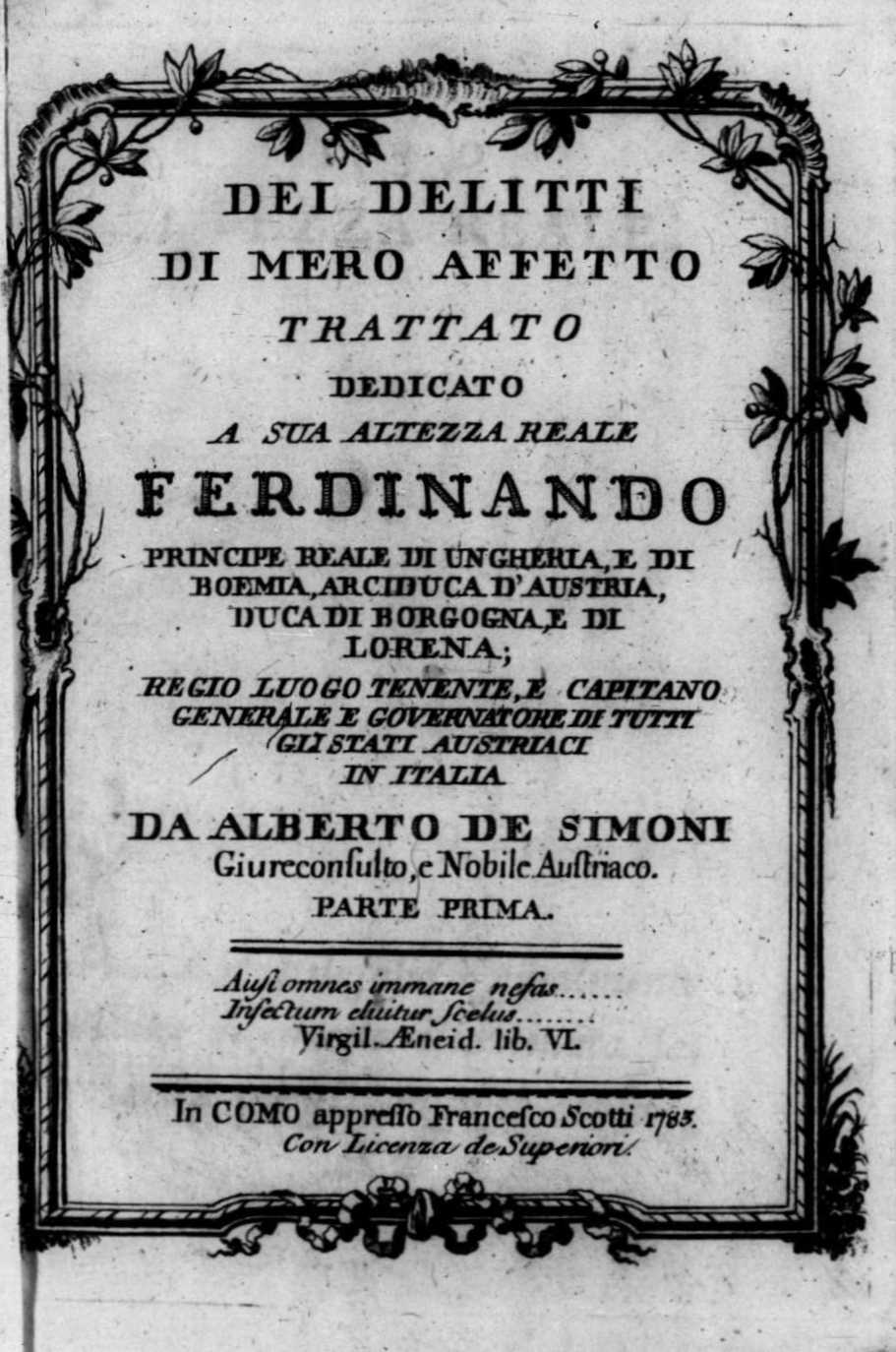
De Simoni, Alberto – Dei delitti di mero affetto, 1783 – BEIC

Alberto de Simoni (3 June 1740 – 31 January 1822) was an Italian lawyer and jurist.

== Biography ==
Born in Bormio, in the Valtellina, near the border of Switzerland and Lombardy to a family of some means, with a physician father. he began his studies with the Jesuits in Bormio, and then moved to study rhetoric and philosophy the Jesuit college at the Brera Academy of Milan. Seeking to study law in the Hapsburg-ruled Lombardy, he attended first the law faculty of Innsbruck; then after two years he passed to the University of Salzburg, returning in 1762 to his native Bormio. He married and settled to practice law. In 1763, he assumed the defense of a certain Gabriele Mesmer, accused of simple theft, but facing the death penalty. This prompted Alberto to examine local legal tradition. he gained a local position as a judge, first in Bormio, then Tirano, and in 1773 in Morbegno.

Throughout his life, while busy as lawyer and judge, he wrote numerous treatises. Among the first were

- Del diritto di scacciare da un paese persone, e famiglie che o vi sono nate, o vi hanno da molti anni trasferito il domicilio (Brescia 1769)
- Consultazione legale nella causa tra la veneranda Confraternita del Suffragio eretta in Tirano, ed il signor canonico d. Antonio Chinali (ibid. 1773)
- Della divisione di terre ossia vicinanze unite già in una sola Comunità, per istituire un nuovo e distinto Corpo Comunitativo (Como 1777)
- Delle donazioni tra vivi fatte in frode degli statuti (Lugano 1783).

However, in 1776 he published Del furto e sua Pena in Lugano. This work, agreeing that common law was riddled with excessive punishments, modified some of the forceful objections of Cesare Beccaria. In the 1770s, he was welcomed in Milan by the plenipotentiary Count Carlo di Firmian and befriended Gian Rinaldo Carli. In 1783, he published Dei delitti considerati nel solo affecto ed attentati suggesting reform of the criminal statutes, and aligning himself with those who thought laws would aim to deter future crime, not only punish prior acts.

His legal actions in the Valtellina created friction with the independent minded locals, long resentful of control from Milan. Alberto though had the support of the Austrian rulers of Lombardy and helped fashion relations between this region and the central government. In 1788, he wrote a treatise titled Prospetto storico-critico della Valtellina and in 1791, Giuramento giuridico politico sobre la costituzione della Valtellina.

In 1797, with the advent of the Napoleonic invasion and the establishment of republican governments, Albert moved to Ardenno as a judge in 1799, and in 1802 was named secretary to the Minister of Justice, Buonaventura Spannocchi, of the Italian Republic. He participated, with the support of Count Melzi in an ambitious movement to modernize and codify the legal and criminal code. In the early 19th century, he accumulated a number of honors, including being appointed as member of the National Institute of Sciences, Letters and Arts of Bologna, and was subsequently confirmed in the Royal Italian Institute of Milan. In 1807, he was named judge of the Supreme Court of Cassation. By 1811, he was becoming deaf but gained the rank of judge of the Supreme Court. He retired to Ardenno, where he died in 1822.
