= Alberto Cozer =

Alberto Cozer (born February 7, 1981, in Rio de Janeiro) is a systems engineer, writer and speaker.

He was a Brazilian security expert with work in the security research and development area, namely in the security human interface field. In 2005 he was named as one of the 50 most influential security professionals in Brazil by Brazil IT Intelligence and Computerworld magazine. Alberto is the co-author of the book "Alvancando Negócios na Internet" (Setting Up Your Internet Business) (Axcel Books, 2000); it was a best-seller in Brazil in 2000 (source: Revista Exame).
