= Alberto Carpinteri =

Italian professor and engineer (born 1952)

- Born: 23 December 1952 (age 73); Bologna, Italy
- Scientific career
- Fields: Physics. Civil Engineering, Nuclear Engineering
- Workplaces: Shantou University, Polytechnic University of Turin, Istituto Nazionale di Ricerca Metrologica in Turin

Alberto Carpinteri (born 23 December 1952) is an Italian engineer and physicist known for his contributions to fracture mechanics, structural engineering, and materials science. His research has focused on the mechanics of solids and structures, structural integrity, and crack propagation phenomena in quasi-brittle materials. He has held senior academic and leadership positions in Italy and internationally and is currently Chang Jiang (Blue River) Chair Professor of Civil Engineering at Shantou University, China.

== Education ==
Carpinteri earned a doctoral degree in Nuclear Engineering from the University of Bologna in 1976, graduating cum laude. He subsequently completed a second doctoral degree in Mathematics at the same university in 1981, also cum laude.

== Career ==
Carpinteri began his academic career as a researcher in the Nuclear Power Plants Programme of the Consiglio Nazionale delle Ricerche (CNR) in Bologna, later also serving as an assistant professor at the University of Bologna.

In 1986, he joined the Politecnico di Torino, where he was appointed Chair Professor of the Mechanics of Solids and Structures, a position he held until 2023. During his tenure at Politecnico di Torino, he served in several academic leadership roles, including Head of the Department of Structural Engineering, Director of the “A. Castigliano” Fracture Mechanics Laboratory, and Founding Director of the Doctoral School of Structural Engineering.

In addition to his academic appointments, Carpinteri held leadership roles within Italy’s national research system. He served as President and previously Deputy President of the National Research Institute of Metrology (INRIM) in Turin.

In 2013, INRIM was placed under temporary receivership following the resignation of a majority of its board members. In this context, Carpinteri was dismissed from his position. The episode was associated with internal institutional disputes, including disagreement over his public support for research related to so-called piezonuclear phenomena.

Carpinteri has held numerous leadership positions in international scientific and professional organizations. He served as President of the International Congress on Fracture (ICF), the European Structural Integrity Society (ESIS), the International Association of Fracture Mechanics for Concrete and Concrete Structures (IA-FraMCoS), and the Italian Group of Fracture (IGF). He was also the Head of the Engineering Division in the European Academy of Sciences (EurASc). He was a member of the Executive Committee of the International Union of Theoretical and Applied Mechanics (IUTAM) from 2004 to 2012 and served on the executive board of the Society for Experimental Mechanics (SEM) from 2012 to 2014.

Carpinteri also served as Editor-in-Chief of Meccanica, an international journal of Springer Nature covering theoretical and applied mechanics, and has been a member of editorial boards of several international journals in mechanics and structural engineering.

== Research ==
Carpinteri’s research has primarily addressed fracture mechanics, structural integrity, and the mechanical behavior of materials and structures. His work has contributed to the understanding of crack initiation and propagation, size-scale effects on structural brittleness and material properties, plasticity, and instability phenomena in solids, with applications to concrete, masonry, and composite materials.

In later phases of his career, he also investigated anomalous energy-release phenomena in solids subjected to mechanical stress, a line of inquiry sometimes described as condensed matter nuclear science.

He has supervised 35 doctoral dissertations and over 120 master’s theses. Many of his former students have gone on to academic or research careers in Italy and abroad. Carpinteri has authored over 450 peer-reviewed scientific journal articles, 18 books, and numerous invited papers and keynote lectures.

== Selected publications ==
=== Books ===
- Carpinteri, Alberto (1986). Mechanical damage and crack growth in concrete : Plastic collapse to brittle fracture (1st ed.). Dordrecht: Martinus Nijhoff Publishers.
- Carpinteri, Alberto (1997). Structural Mechanics—A Unified Approach. Abingdon, UK: Taylor & Francis. ISBN 978-0-203-23846-2.
- Carpinteri, Alberto (20 September 2013). Structural Mechanics Fundamentals. CRC Press. ISBN 978-0-415-58032-8.
- Carpinteri, Alberto (14 July 2017). Advanced Structural Mechanics. CRC Press. ISBN 978-1-315-35482-8.
- Carpinteri, Alberto (26 June 2021). Fracture and Complexity: One Century since Griffith's Milestone. Springer Nature. ISBN 978-94-024-2026-5.
- Carpinteri, Alberto (2026). Terahertz Phonons and Nanomechanical Instabilities. Springer (published 3 April 2026). p. 470. ISBN 9783032146915.

=== Articles ===
- Carpinteri, Alberto (1 February 1994). "Scaling laws and renormalization groups for strength and toughness of disordered materials". International Journal of Solids and Structures. 31 (3): 291–302. doi:10.1016/0020-7683(94)90107-4. ISSN 0020-7683.
- Carpinteri, Alberto (1 July 1994). "Fractal nature of material microstructure and size effects on apparent mechanical properties". Mechanics of Materials. Special Issue on Microstructure and Strain Localization in Geomaterials. 18 (2): 89–101. doi:10.1016/0167-6636(94)00008-5. ISSN 0167-6636.
- Pugno, N.; Ciavarella, M.; Cornetti, P.; Carpinteri, A. (1 July 2006). "A generalized Paris' law for fatigue crack growth". Journal of the Mechanics and Physics of Solids. 54 (7): 1333–1349. doi:10.1016/j.jmps.2006.01.007. ISSN 0022-5096.
- Cornetti, Pietro; Pugno, Nicola; Carpinteri, Alberto; Taylor, David (1 September 2006). "Finite fracture mechanics: A coupled stress and energy failure criterion". Engineering Fracture Mechanics. 73 (14): 2021–2033. doi:10.1016/j.engfracmech.2006.03.010. ISSN 0013-7944.
- Carpinteri, A.; Lacidogna, G.; Pugno, N. (1 January 2007). "Structural damage diagnosis and life-time assessment by acoustic emission monitoring". Engineering Fracture Mechanics. Fracture of Concrete Materials and Structures. 74 (1): 273–289. doi:10.1016/j.engfracmech.2006.01.036. ISSN 0013-7944.
- Carpinteri, Alberto; Chiaia, Bernardino; Ferro, Giuseppe Andrea (1995). "Size effects on nominal tensile strength of concrete structures: multifractality of material ligaments and dimensional transition from order to disorder". Materials and Structures. 28: 311–317.
- Carpinteri, Alberto; Ferro, Giuseppe (1 December 1994). "Size effects on tensile fracture properties: a unified explanation based on disorder and fractality of concrete microstructure". Materials and Structures. 27 (10): 563–571. doi:10.1007/BF02473124. ISSN 1871-6873.
- Bocca, Pietro; Carpinteri, Alberto; Valente, Silvio (1 January 1991). "Mixed mode fracture of concrete". International Journal of Solids and Structures. 27 (9): 1139–1153. doi:10.1016/0020-7683(91)90115-V. ISSN 0020-7683.
- Carpinteri, Alberto (1989). "Cusp catastrophe interpretation of fracture instability". Journal of the Mechanics and Physics of Solids. 37 (5): 567–582. doi:10.1016/0022-5096(89)90029-x. ISSN 0022-5096.
- Carpinteri, Alberto (1982). "Notch sensitivity in fracture testing of aggregative materials". Engineering Fracture Mechanics. 16 (4): 467–481. doi:10.1016/0013-7944(82)90127-8. ISSN 0013-7944.

== Prizes and honours ==
- Odone Belluzzi Prize for Science of Constructions, University of Bologna (1976)
- Medal Robert L'Hermite, RILEM (1982)
- NATO Senior Scholarship – Lehigh University, Pennsylvania (1982) – Northwestern University, Illinois (1985)
- Honorary degree in physics, Constantinian University, Rhode Island (1994)
- Albert Schweitzer Medal, University of Geneve, Switzerland (2000)
- Wessex Institute of Technology International Prize, Southampton, UK (2000)
- Griffith Medal, ESIS (2008)
- Swedlow Memorial Lecture Award, ASTM (2011)
- Paris Gold Medal, ICF (2013)
- Frocht Award, Society for Experimental Mechanics (SEM), United States (2017)
- Honorary Professorship, Tianjin University, China (2017)
- Giuliano Preparata Award, International Society for Condensed Matter Nuclear Science (ISCMNS), for studies on Low Energy Nuclear Reactions (2022)
- George Irwin Medal, ASTM International, United States (2023)
- Honorary Editor, Smart Construction & Sustainable Cities, Springer Nature (2023)
- Honorary Professor, Shenyang Northeastern University, China (2024)
- Lifetime Achievement Medal, International Conference on Damage Mechanics (ICDM) (2025)
- Pascal Medal 2026 in Engineering, European Academy of Sciences (EurASc), Brussels
