= Alberto dos Santos Franco =

- Born: December 5, 1913 Rio de Janeiro, Brazil
- Died: May 4, 2011 (aged 97) São Paulo
- Occupation: Professor and Researcher

Alberto dos Santos Franco (December 5, 1913 – May 4, 2011) was an officer of the Navy of Brazil. In his career, reached the rank of rear admiral.

== Biography ==
He was the son of Luiz de Araujo Franco and Adelina Santos Franco.

He attended high school in the traditional school Pedro II in Rio de Janeiro and became a navy officer in the Naval Academy in 1933. Participated in the war efforts of the Navy of Brazil during World War II. Later he specialized in studies related to the phenomena of the tides. He was promoted to rear admiral in 1961, he won several medals and was awarded the title of Professor Emeritus of the Oceanographic Institute of the University of São Paulo in 1996, where he was director in the period 1970–1974. Developed computational methods based on techniques of fast Fourier transform for analysis and prediction of tides. In 1976 he earned a doctorate in Naval Engineering from Polytechnic School of the University of São Paulo defending thesis entitled "Components in Harmonic Tide Small Funds". These components are generated by tidal currents, where the periodic movements (amplitude and phase) of Sun and Moon in "around the Earth" are combined in a nonlinear way leading to other components called small fund. It is now generated by the transformation of the tide in ocean barotropic baroclinic tides in the shallow regions of offshore.

== Participation in hydrographic cruises for building charts ==
(Ministry of the Navy – 1937 to 1955)

- Letters – Areas
- 802 – Port Natal
- 803 – Canal de Sao Roque
- 1103 – Bay of Aratu and vicinity (campaign manager)
- 1400 – From Rio Doce to Cabo de Sao Tome
- 1500 – Cape of São Tomé to Rio de Janeiro
- 1504 – Bay of Búzios
- 1505 – Cape Buzios Cabo Frio
- 1700 – The Island of San Sebastian on the island of Bom Abrigo
- 1701 – Port of Santos
- 1800 – From Ilha de Bom Abrigo to Ilha do grove
- 1804 – Port of South San Francisco
- 1805 – Fairway to Joinville
- 1809 – Bay of Itapocoroia (campaign manager)
- 1810 – Bay of Porto Belo
- 1900 – From the Island Grove Towers (campaign manager)
- 1905 – Port of Florianópolis (campaign manager)

== Scientific papers ==
- Comparative precision of prismatic astrolabes. International Hydrographic Review XXVIII(1), 1951.
- Modification of the mean projection plane of the Multiplex apparatus. International Hydrographic Review, XXIX( ), 1952. Work awarded by the Brazilian Navy.
- Shallow-water tides. International Hydrographic Review, XXXIII(1), 1956.
- Brazilian Navy Instruction on Tides. International Hydrographic Review, XL(1), 1963.
- Harmonic Analysis of the tide by the semi-graphic method. International Hydrographic Review, XL(2), 1963.
- Adjustment of aerial triangulation. International Hydrographic Review, XLI(1), 1964.
- Harmonic analysis of tides for seven days of hourly observations. International Hydrographic Review, XLI(2), 1964.
- Harmonic analysis of tides through linear combinations of ordinates. International Hydrographic Review, XLII(1), 1965.
- Relative accuracy of some methods of harmonic analysis of tides. International Hydrographic Review. XLII(2), 1965.
- Semi-graphic method of analysis for seven days' tidal observations. International Hydrographic Review, XLIII(1),1966.
- Datum for sounding reduction. International Hydrographic Review, XLIII(2), 1966.
- The Munk-Cartwright method for prediction and analysis of tides. International Hydrographic Review, XLV(1), 1968.
- Generalization of y-parallax differential formula. Photogrammetria Elsevier Publishing Company, Amsterdam, 23,(1968) 95–102.
- Fundamentals of spectral analysis of discrete observations. International Hydrographic Review. XLVII(1), 1970.
- The Fast Fourier Transform and its application to tidal oscillations. Boletim do Instituto Oceanográfico da Universidade de São Paulo, 20(1). 1971. (in collaboration with N.J. Rock).
- A hybrid algorithm for the rapid Fourier transform of extensive series of data. Boletim do Instituto Oceanográfico da Universidade de São Paulo, 20(2), 1971. (in collaboration with N.J. Rock).
- Comparative accuracy of Fourier tidal analysis employing different time spans with reference to Doodson analysis. The 2nd International Ocean Development Conference, Toquio, 1972 (preprint). (in collaboration with N.J. Rock).
- Improved harmonic analysis. Revista Ciência e Cultura, 25(2).1973. (in collaboration with N.J. Rock).
- A refined method of tidal analysis. The Belle W. Baruch Library in Marine Science, 7. Syposium on Estuarine Transport Process held in Georgetown, South Carolina, 1976. Edited by Böjrn Kjerfve. University of South Carolina press.
- On the Karunaratne's method of checking hourly heights. International Hydrographic Review, LIX(1), 1982.
- Improved technique of short period analysis. Canadian Hydrographic Service Centennial Conference. Ottawa, 1983. (in collaboration with J. Harari).
- Tidal prediction with a small personal computer. International Hydrographic Review, LXII(2).
- On the stability of long series tidal analysis. 1993(in collaboration with J. Harari). International Hydrographic Review, Monaco, LXX(1), march.
- Rapid tidal analysis, from 3 3/4 julian years span up to a nodal cycle span, with a PC. 1995. International Hydrographic Review, Monaco, LXXII(1), Monaco, march.
