= Alberto Barrera Zurita =

Mexican politician

- Born: 24 August 1973 (age 52); Veracruz, Veracruz, Mexico
- Occupation: Politician
- Political party: PRI

Baruch Alberto Barrera Zurita (born 24 August 1973 in Veracruz, Veracruz) is a Mexican politician affiliated with the Institutional Revolutionary Party (formerly to the National Action Party). As of 2014 he served as Deputy of the LIX Legislature of the Mexican Congress as a plurinominal representative.
