= Alberto Giurioli =

Italian musician (born 1991)

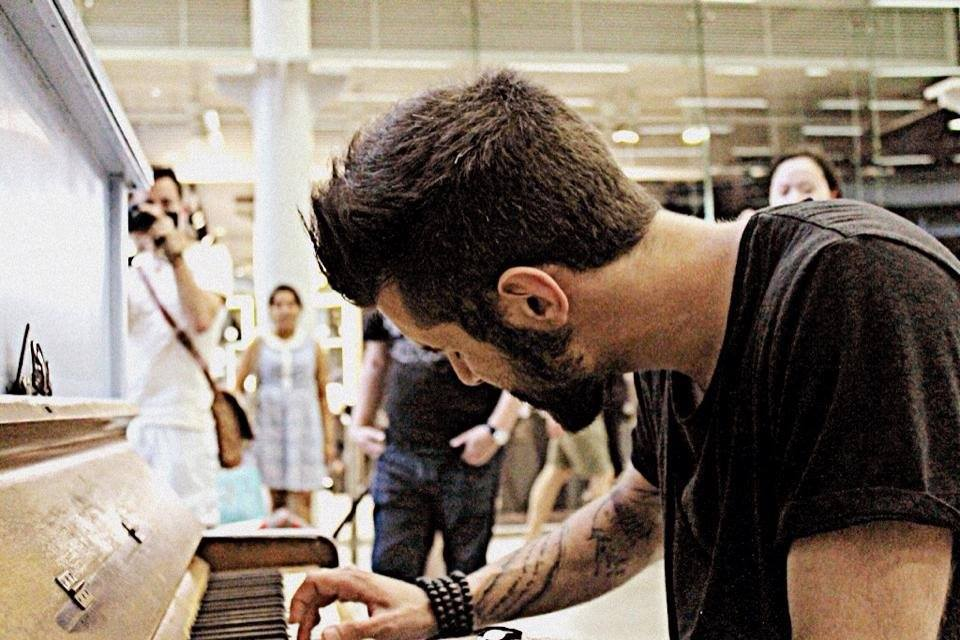

Background information
- Born: 24 July 1991 (age 35)
- Origin: Badia Polesine, Italy
- Genres: Modern classical, Contemporary Classical Music
- Occupations: Composer, Pianist
- Instruments: Piano, electric guitar, Bass guitar
- Years active: 2009-present
- Label: PIAS
- Website: Official website

Alberto Giurioli (born 24 July 1991) is an Italian pianist and composer, based in London.

Born in Badia Polesine, Italy (a municipality in Rovigo), Giurioli is the son of Pietro Giurioli and Alice Fasolin. He began studying piano at the age of 4 and studied at the music school Libera Espressione Musicale. He has also studied at the Cat Sound Studio under Patrizia Arduini and Mario Marcassa, and at the conservatory of music Conservatorio di Musica Francesco Venezze in Rovigo. Giurioli earned a degree in International Economics from the University of Padua.

Giurioli also plays keyboards, electric guitar, bass guitar and drums. He has appeared on television on channels such as 7 Gold, and performed in London on public street pianos. He lives in London.

Giurioli's first album, Ali, was released in July 2011 through Cat Sound Records.

After moving to London in 2015, Giurioli began collaborating with the orchestrator Geoff Lawson, deepening his understanding of orchestration in the Neo-classical genre.

Giurioli has performed as a guest for Sofar Sound in London. His collaboration with Classic FM led to a performance as part of Global's Make Some Noise in October 2017, performing at Steinway and Sons Hall in December 2017, and live streaming performances on the public pianos dotted around London's railway stations on Classic FM's social media, earning an international audience. His track "Tutto E' Bellissimo" debuted on Classic FM in December 2017 and reached number 1 on the iTunes Classical Charts in the UK, as well as in Spain. This led to him being inducted into the Classic FM Hall of Fame as the youngest composer ever and being named one of the 30 brilliant classical musicians under 30 by British cellist and conductor Julian Lloyd Webber in 2021.

In November 2018, "Nightfall", his new single, premiered on Classic FM and went to number 3 on the iTunes UK Chart and in Spain. The track has been featured on the BBC.

In January 2019, Giurioli had the opportunity to record at the BBC Maida Vale studio MV4 four tracks in acoustic, which was aired during Alberto's interview made by Janice Long.

In May 2019, he performed at the Swiss Church in London and at the Teatro Sociale in Italy.

== Discography ==
=== Solo Releases ===
- 2011: Ali (Album)
- 2014: Time Goes By (Single)
- 2016: One Note (Single – piano, electronic, orchestra) · reached 1 million plays on Spotify (22 August 2016)
- 2017: Following Yourself
- 2017: Tutto è Bellissimo
- 2018: Nightfall

=== Synchronisations ===
- 2012: "Overture" for the musical comedy Stravaganza (written by Dacia Maraini)
- 2013: La7 (Italian National Television)
- 2013: "Never-ending dream" used in "Ghost of Christmas Present" by Klaire De Lys
- 2014: Composition "London Calling" used in the book trailer of "L’accarezzatrice" written by Italian actress Giorgia Würth
- 2014: "Following Yourself" used in Deejay TV's documentary "Yukon Blues" (Italian national TV)
- 2014: "Time Goes By" used in "Knud Speed Drawing" by Klaire De Lys
- 2016: Weav (Little Cute Apps by Lars Rasmussen): Adaptive Remixes of "One Note" and "Following Yourself"
- 2016: SMU: SoA Admission Video (Singapore)
- 2016: Éen – Het Goeie Leven (Belgian TV Show)
- 2016: "Time goes by" in Randy Tan's travelogue "Explore Lampung – Pulau Pisang" (Indonesia)
- 2017: "Tutto e' bellissimo" in Porsche Auf Sylt (Germany)
