= Alberto Francisco Ngalanela =

Angolan politician

Alberto Francisco Ngalanela is an Angolan politician for UNITA and a member of the National Assembly of Angola.
