= Alberto Faya =

Cuban singer, composer, and academic

- Born: 1944 (age 81–82)
- Education: University of Havana
- Occupation: Professor

Alberto Faya (born 1944) is a Cuban singer, researcher, composer, and professor of music.

== Biography ==
Faya gives lectures relating to Cuban history, culture, and music. He holds a degree from the University of Havana and is a professor of musical culture at the university.

During the 1970s, Faya was one of a number of Cuban musicians who worked to better incorporate African and Afro-Cuban music in Cuban society; according to his accounts, he had to right vigorously to air Afro-Cuban rumba music on Cuban radio stations. Faya is a believer in the ongoing melding of different cultures, and considers culture as the primary means by which personal identity is derived. Faya is a self-proclaimed Afrocentrist, as he finds that his musical background most defines his understanding of culture and identity.
