= Alberto Bellini =

Italian volleyball player (born 1987)

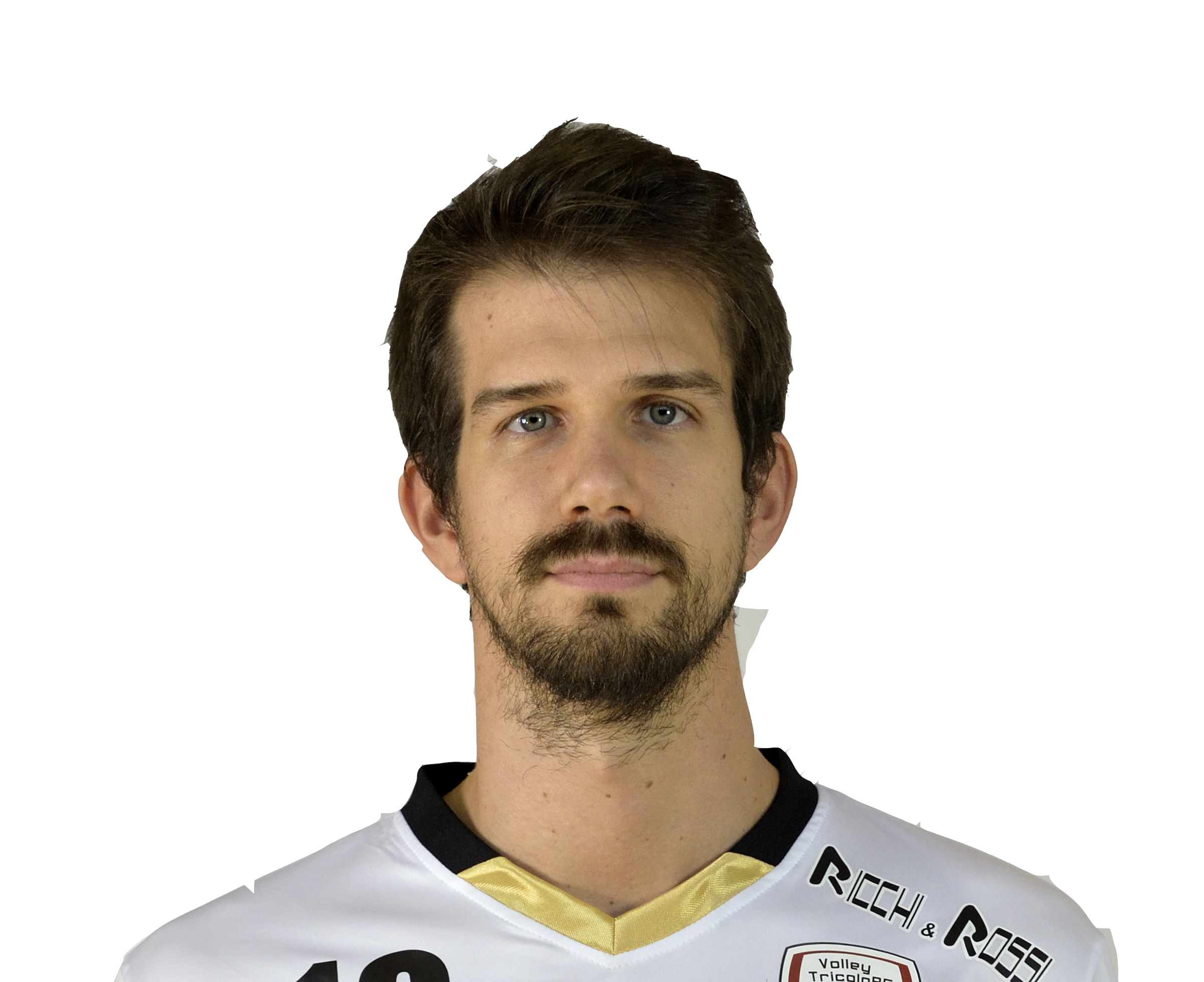

Personal information
- Nationality: Italian
- Born: 7 June 1987 (age 39); Dolo
- Height: 6 ft 7 in (2.01 m)

Volleyball information
- Position: outside hitter
- Current club: (Italy) Conad Reggio Emilia
- Number: 10

Career
Years	Teams
2005-2006; 2006-2007; 2007-2010; 2010-2011; 2011-2012; 2012-2013; 2013-2015; 2015-2016; 2016-2017; 2017-	(Italy) Volley Brenta Fiesso (Italy) Pallavolo Vicenza (Italy) Volley Trebaseleghe (Italy) Volley Segrate 1978 (Italy) Virtus Potenza (Italy) Libertas Cantù (Italy) Sarca Italchef Centrale Brescia (Italy) Olimpia Bergamo (Italy) GoldenPlast Potenza Picena (Italy) Conad Reggio Emilia

Alberto Bellini (born 7 June 1987) is an Italian volleyball player, playing in position outside hitter. Since the 2017/2018 season, he has played for Conad Reggio Emilia.

== Sporting achievements ==
=== National team ===
Junior European Championship:

- 2006
