= Alberto Argañaraz =

Argentine footballer

Personal information
- Full name: Alberto Ezequiel Argañaraz
- Date of birth: 13 November 1992 (age 33)
- Place of birth: San Miguel de Tucumán, Argentina
- Position: Forward

Senior career*
Years	Team	Apps	(Gls)
2012–2014	Atlético Tucumán	17	(1)
2014–2015	San Jorge de Tucumán	35	(16)
2016	Independiente Rivadavia	7	(0)
2016	Concepcion F.C.	7	(1)
2017	Amalia	16	(1)
2019–2020	Deportivo El Galpon	17	(4)
- * Club domestic league appearances and goals

Alberto Ezequiel Argañaraz (born 13 November 1992), nicknamed Beto Argañaraz, is an Argentine footballer who played as a forward.

He was born in San Miguel de Tucumán.

== Clubs and statistics ==
Club	Season	Ligue		Cup National		Cup International		Total	
Club	Season	Matches	Goals	Matches	Goals	Matches	Goals	Matches	Goals
Atlético Tucumán	2011–12	1	0	-	-	-	-	1	0
Atlético Tucumán	2012–13	9	1	3	0	-	-	12	1
Atlético Tucumán	2013–14	4	0	0	0	-	-	4	0
Atlético Tucumán	Total	14	1	3	0	-	-	17	1
San Jorge de Tucuman	2014	6	1	-	-	-	-	6	1
San Jorge de Tucuman	2015	16	4	-	-	-	-	16	4
San Jorge de Tucuman	Total	22	5	-	-	-	-	22	5
Independiente Rivadavia	2016	7	0	-	-	-	-	7	0
Concepcion F.C.	2016	7	1	-	-	-	-	7	1
Amalia	2017	16	1	-	-	-	-	16	1
Deportivo El Galpon	2017	17	4	-	-	-	-	17	4
	Total	47	6	-	-	-	-	47	6
Total Career		83	12	3	0	0	0	85	12
