= Alberto Mantelli =

Alberto Mantelli (Torino, May 14, 1909 – Torino, September 1, 1967) was an Italian musicologist and music critic.

== Biography ==
(Giacomo) Alberto Mantelli studied at Liceo Classico Massimo d'Azeglio of Torino, under Augusto Monti and Italo Maione. He graduated in Law in Turin with a thesis on "The object of copyright in musical creation"

He contributed to the Rivista Musicale Italiana (1932) with an essay entitled "Debussy and Mallarmé" and, subsequently, to the Rassegna Musicale, where he published articles on Stravinsky, Hindemith, Berg and Ravel, among others.

In 1936 he wrote the first essay appeared in Italy on Alban Berg (La Rassegna Musicale, 1936). He created the Italian rhythmic version of Alban Berg's Wozzeck for the famous first performance in Rome in 1942. In the same year he published the Guide to Wozzeck. His essay "Three centuries of European music" was published in 1947, when Mantelli also edited the first Italian edition of the autobiography of Igor Stravinsky "Croniques de ma vie," which he also translated. At that time, Mantelli was also a member of the organizing committee of the International Festival of Contemporary Music at the Venice Biennale.

Mantelli started working at EIAR in Rome in 1938 in the Programming Office. After a break due to war, he returned to EIAR (later, RAI) in 1946 as the manager of the music sector of the radio station of Turin.

== The Italian Third Radio Programme ==
In 1950, during Sernesi's RAI direction, Mantelli conceived, organized and directed the Third Radio Programme. The Third Programme began broadcasting at 9 in the evening of Sunday, October 1, 1950, from the FM stations in Bologna, Florence, Genoa, Milan, Naples, Rome, Turin, Venice and from the short-wave station of Rome. The first show was dedicated to the myth of Orpheus with an introduction by Emilio Cecchi and works Claudio Monteverdi, Jacques Offenbach and Igor Stravinsky.

The Third Programme broadcast from 9 to 11:15 in the evening and was conceived as the cultural programme for the Italian public broadcasting service (RAI). Mantelli's approach was far more interesting than the label suggests: 'Provided, of course, that the term culture is assumed in its most alive and real sense of expression of the spiritual life, and also, extending somewhat its meaning, in the sense of a living and concrete reflection on the issues in which man exists, struggles, and grows today. It would be naive to mark borders not to cross, prohibited areas that cannot be violated, when one well knows that it is human and at times inevitable to go out of the sign. It is obvious that in saying culture in this sense, one wants to avoid to identify it with pure scholarship which is essentially the basis and instrument of culture, and as such cannot be the fundamental object of a forum open to the public as is radio. "

As it is evident from the first evening's program, Mantelli conceived and realized the idea of subject evenings, which would later become a widespread approach in radio and television programs, "the whole transmission of an evening to which texts, music, theater, narrative can contribute, revolves around a subject which may be from time to time, an artist (Gide, Clair, Schumann), a myth (Orpheus), a city as an expression of culture and civilization (Vienna, world of yesterday), a cultural milestone (Paris 1830), and so on. "

The transition from undifferentiated radio programmes to specific (light, cultural and "medium") radio channels, interested in the same period the French radio and BBC (e.g., the BBC third cultural program). The contribution of Mantelli to this transformation was recognized by, among others, E. M. Forster.

== Subsequent years ==
Subsequently, Mantelli held major posts in RAI, and, in 1959 he became central deputy director of radio programs. Among his responsibilities, relationships with European and international radio and music organizations.

He continued his collaboration with the Third Programme, particularly for music programming, and he edited numerous broadcasts for it.

In 1958, Mantelli founded L'Approdo Musicale, of the most important Italian journals of music criticism, which he directed from the first to the last number. The journal, published by ERI, was conceived as a series of single numbers on composers, mostly modern and contemporary one: the first issue was devoted to Alfredo Casella, the last one to Anton Bruckner. The number on Debussy was entirely written by Mantelli.

Mantelli was involved with the organization of the "Prix Italia", since its first edition in Capri in 1948. He also edited its important annual publications.

In 1955, Mantelli and Luigi Rognoni founded the Musical Phonology Studio in Milan, to which Mantelli actively collaborated. He also organized the first "International Congress of Experimental Music" in Venice in 1961.

He edited and partly wrote several volumes for ERI. Among these, "La Regia" (1955), which he wrote with Apollonio, Ferrieri and Rondi.

== Publications ==
(Partial list)

- Debussy e Mallarmè, Rivista Musicale Italiana, 1932
- Debussy critico antidilettante, Rassegna Nazionale, 1932
- Ravel Concerto per pianoforte e orchestra, Rivista Musicale, 1932
- Introduzione a Brahms, La Rassegna Musicale VI, 1933
- Compositore e trascrittore, La Rassegna Musicale VII, 1934
- Note su Alban Berg, La Rassegna Musicale IX, 1936
- La verità su Tristano, La Rassegna Musicale X, 1937
- La scrittura di Beethoven, La Rassegna Musicale X, 1937
- L'ultimo Hindemith, La Rassegna Musicale X, 1937
- Il pubblico di fronte alla musica, Congresso Internazionale di Musica, Firenze, 1937
- Maurice Ravel, La Rassegna Musicale XI, 1938
- Maurice Ravel, in Hommage à Maurice Ravel, La Revue Musicale, 1938
- Igor Strawinsky e le sue opere più recenti, La Rassegna Musicale XIV, 1941
- Wozzeck di Alban Berg, La Lampada, 1942
- Casella compositore da camera, La Rassegna Musicale XVI, 1943
- La posizione di Strawinsky nella musica moderna, La Rassegna Musicale XVII, 1944
- Manuel De Falla, La Rassegna Musicale XVII, 1944
- Maurice Ravel, Concerto per la mano sinistra, a cura di A.Mantelli, Ed.Fonit 1944
- Il mondo poetico di Mendelssohn, La Rassegna Musicale XVIII, 1945
- "Pulcinella" di Strawinsky, La Rassegna Musicale XIX, 1946
- Strawinsky, IX Festival Internazionale di Musica Contemporanea, Biennale di Venezia 1946
- Dallapiccola e il linguaggio dodecafonico, IX Festival Internazionale di Musica Contemporanea, Biennale di Venezia 1946
- Brahms, ”Concerto in si bem.maggiore op.83", Fonit, 1946
- Paul Hindemith, X Festival Internazionale di Musica Contemporanea, Biennale di Venezia 1947
- (introduzione e traduzione di A. Mantelli) Strawinsky, Cronache della mia vita, a cura di A.Mantelli, Ed.Minuziano 1947
- Brahms musicista romantico, Conversazioni in occasione delle Celebrazioni Brahmsiane, 11 Aprile 1947
- “L'Incubo“ di Nielsen, XI Festival Internazionale di Musica Contemporanea Biennale di Venezia, 1948
- Problemi di linguaggio nell'opera di Strawinsky, Atti del V Congresso di Musica, Firenze, 1948
- Aspetti della musica strumentale del seicento”, Incontri a Capri, RAI 1948
- Intorno alla "Storia del Soldato", La Rassegna Musicale XXII, 1949
- La variazione da Frescobaldi a Busoni, I notturni dell'usignolo trasmessi dalle stazioni della Rete Azzurra, 1949
- 3° Programma ott.nov.dic., RAI radio italiana, 1950
- Problemi di regia radiofonica, in La Regia di M. Apollonio, E. Ferrieri, A.Mantelli e G. L. Rondi, ERI, 1955
- Lettera a Casella, L'Approdo Musicale 1, ERI, 1958
- Razionalismo e sensibilità di Maurice Ravel, L'Approdo Musicale 2, ERI, 1958
- Prospetto cronologico della vita e delle opere di Maurice Ravel, L'Approdo Musicale 2, ERI, 1958
- Il tempo di Strauss, L'Approdo Musicale 5, ERI, 1959
- Prospetto cronologico della vita e delle opere di Richerd Strauss, L'Approdo Musicale 5, ERI, 1959
- Claude Debussy, L'Approdo Musicale 7/8, ERI, 1959
- Prospetto cronologico della vita e delle opere di Claude Debussy, L'Approdo Musicale 7/8, ERI, 1959
- Prospetto cronologico della vita e delle opere di Gian Francesco Malipiero, L'Approdo Musicale 9, ERI, 1960
- Debussy et l'évolution de la musique au xx siècle, Edition du centre national de la recherche, Paris 1962
- Europeismo di M. de Falla, in Manuel de Falla, a cura di M. Mila, Edizioni Ricordi, 1962
- Pulcinella ou une histoire napolitaine, ERI Edizioni RAI, 1963
- Creation poètique et stereophonie, VIII Festival International du son, Paris 1966
