= Alberto Febbrajo =

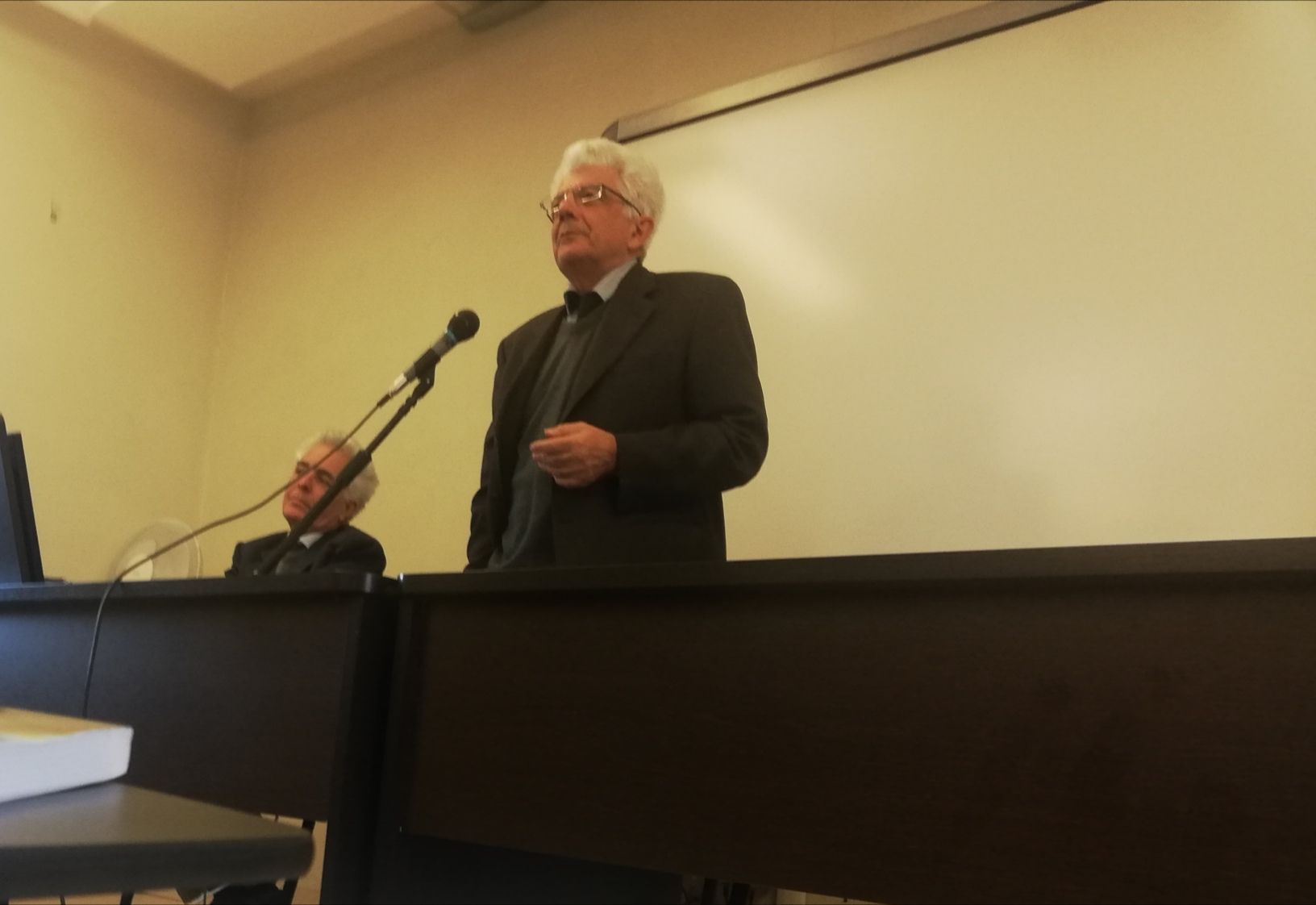
Alberto V. Febbrajo

Alberto V. Febbrajo (born 19 July 1944, in Vittorio Veneto) is an Italian legal scholar and sociologist.

Febbrajo studied under the political philosopher Bruno Leoni at the University of Pavia and graduated in law with a thesis on Max Weber’s sociology of law. He continued his studies at the Universities of Berlin and Freiburg im Breisgau and at the German University of Administrative Sciences in Speyer. He is Professor of Sociology of Law at the University of Macerata, Italy.

Febbrajo has also been Head of the Law Department (1986-1990) and Rector (1991-2003) at the same University. He is co-director of the journal “Sociologia del diritto” and editor of the Studies in the Sociology of Law Series (Ashgate). In 2009, he established the Fermo Summer School on legal and sociological aspects of European Governance. At present Febbrajo is coordinator of the "Sociology of Law” section of the Italian Sociological Association.

He is well known for introducing in Italy socio-legal authors such as Eugen Ehrlich, Theodor Geiger and Niklas Luhmann.

== Selected publications ==
- Funzionalismo strutturale e sociologia del diritto nell’opera di Niklas Luhmann, Milano, Giuffrè, 1975
- “European Yearbook in the Sociology of Law”, (edited by), Milano, Giuffrè, 1988, ISBN 8814015104
- State, Law and Economy as Autopoietic Systems. Regulation and Autonomy in a New Perspective, (with G. Teubner), Milano, Giuffrè, 1992, ISBN 881402510X
- “European Yearbook in the Sociology of Law”, (with D. Nelken), Milano, Giuffrè, 1993, ISBN 8814035067
- Social Processes and Patterns of Legal Control, (with D. Nelken and V. Olgiati), Milano, Giuffrè, 2000, ISBN 8814084114
- Cultura giuridica e politiche pubbliche in Italia, (with A. La Spina and M. Raiteri), Milano, Giuffrè, 2006, ISBN 8814113629
- Eugen Ehrlich, Hans Kelsen, Max Weber. Verso un concetto sociologico di diritto, Milano, Giuffrè, 2010, ISBN 8814056293
- Central and Eastern Europe After Transition. Towards a New Socio-legal Semantics, (with W. Sadurski), Farnham, Ashgate, 2010, ISBN 1409497224
- The Financial Crisis in Constitutional Perspective. The Dark Side of Functional Differentiation, (with P. F. Kjaer and G. Teubner), Oxford-Portland (OR), Hart, 2011, ISBN 1841130109
- Law and Intersystemic Communication. Understanding ‘Structural Coupling’, (with G. Harste), Farnham, Ashgate, 2013, ISBN 1409421104
- Sociologia del diritto. Concetti e problemi, Bologna, Il Mulino, 2013, II ed., ISBN 9788815245922
- Il diritto frammentato, (with F. Gambino), Milano, Giuffrè, 2014, ISBN 9788814171895
- Le radici del pensiero sociologico-giuridico, (edited by), Milano, Giuffrè, 2014, ISBN 9788814171888
- Dall'unità alla pluralità del diritto, in Ripensare Max Weber nel centocinquantesimo dalla nascita. Atti dei convegni Lincei, Roma, Scienze e Lettere, 2015, pp. 171–192, ISBN 9788821811067

== Translations and editions by Febbrajo ==
- E. Ehrlich, I fondamenti della sociologia del diritto (1913), Milano, Giuffrè, 1976
- N. Luhmann, Sociologia del diritto (1972), Roma-Bari, Laterza, 1977
- N. Luhmann, Sistema giuridico e dogmatica giuridica (1974), Bologna, Il Mulino, 1978
- N. Luhmann, Stato di diritto e sistema sociale (1971), Napoli, Guida, 1978
- A. Ross, Critica del diritto e analisi del linguaggio, Bologna, Il Mulino, 1982 (with R. Guastini)
- N. Luhmann, Sistemi sociali. Fondamenti di una teoria generale (1984), Bologna, Il Mulino, 1990 (with R. Schmidt)
- N. Luhmann, Procedimenti giuridici e legittimazione sociale (1983), Milano, Giuffrè, 1995
- G. Teubner, Il diritto come sistema autopoietico (1989), Milano, Giuffrè, 1996, (with C. Pennisi)
