= Alberto Borin =

Belgian teacher and politician (1940–2023)

Member of the Chamber of Representatives of Belgium
- In office 21 May 1995 – 5 May 1999
- Constituency: Arrondissement of Nivelles

Member of the Senate of Belgium
- In office 4 February 1994 – 21 May 1995
- In office 28 December 1987 – 24 November 1991

Personal details
- Born: 17 March 1940 Katana, Sud-Kivu District, Kivu Province, Belgian Congo
- Died: 3 January 2023 (aged 82) Nivelles, Belgium
- Party: PS
- Education: Université libre de Bruxelles
- Occupation: Teacher

Alberto Borin (17 March 1940 – 3 January 2023) was a Belgian teacher and politician of the Socialist Party (PS).

== Biography ==
Borin earned a teaching degree from the Université libre de Bruxelles and briefly worked as a teacher. From 28 December 1987 to 24 November 1991, he was a provincial senator from the Province of Brabant and later served in the Senate as a co-opted senator. From 21 May 1995 to 5 May 1999, he represented the Arrondissement of Nivelles in the Chamber of Representatives.

Alberto Borin died in Nivelles on 3 January 2023, at the age of 82.
