= Alberto Acereda =

Professor and business leader (born 1965)

- Born: 1965 (age 60–61); Calahorra, La Rioja, Spain
- Occupation: Business Executive

Alberto Acereda is a scholar and executive in global higher education. He has held leadership roles in academic institutions, non-profit assessment organizations, and education technology companies. He previously served as Senior Vice President for Higher Education at Territorium, Inc., and continues to work as a strategist and consultant in the higher education and edtech sectors. At Educational Testing Service (ETS), the world's largest private educational testing and assessment organization, he was an Associate Vice President for Global Higher education where he was responsible for leading and overseeing tertiary education initiatives, including the development and administration of standardized assessments and other related programs. Acereda has been a strong advocate for the global expansion of higher education opportunities. His work at for-profit and non-profit organizations has involved engaging with educational institutions around the world to promote standardized assessments and digital solutions that support academic and professional mobility. He has also emphasized the importance of culturally sensitive assessments that are valid and reliable across different educational systems and cultural contexts. Prior to joining ETS in 2012, he spent nearly twenty years at various universities and graduate programs across the United States.

He was a tenured professor of Spanish and Latin American literatures and cultures and the chair of the Department of Spanish and Portuguese at the "School of International Letters and Cultures" at Arizona State University, (United States), where he also served as director of graduate studies. He was also a member of the ASU Provost's executive committee and the president of the Senate of the College of Liberal Arts and Sciences at Arizona State University and was named Dean's Fellow in the same college. He is also member of the North American Academy of the Spanish Language ("Academia Norteamericana de la Lengua Española"), a branch of the Real Academia Española and the author of several articles and op-eds in European and American newspapers. While he continues to be a faculty affiliate at Arizona State University's Hispanic Research Center, he has also been a visiting professor at the University of Pennsylvania.

== Biography ==
=== Early life ===
Alberto Acereda was born in Calahorra, La Rioja, Spain in 1965. He studied at the La Salle School, in Tarragona, Spain. He graduated in Hispanic philology at the University of Barcelona. He obtained a master's degree in Spanish literature and a doctorate in Spanish and Latin American literature (University of Georgia, US), as well as a Master's in Business Administration at the European Business School.

=== Career as a university professor ===
For nearly twenty years, he was a professor of Spanish and Latin American literatures (with particular emphasis on the fin de siècle, modernismo and modernity within transatlantic literary and cultural studies), former director of graduate studies in the "School of International Letters and Cultures" at Arizona State University (US), where he was also the chair of the Department of Spanish and Portuguese. He was named to Dean's Faculty Fellow. He was also a faculty affiliate in the program of Jewish studies, and he was also the director and founder of the ASU Study Abroad Program at the University of Alicante (Spain). He has been a visiting professor at the Universidad Menéndez y Pelayo, at the Universidad de Alicante, and the University of Pennsylvania.

=== Career in higher education ===
Acereda's contributions to higher education, particularly through his work at ETS and Territorium, have had a significant impact on how institutions assess and understand student learning and readiness. His leadership has helped shape the global landscape of higher education assessments, making them more accessible and relevant to diverse student populations. His efforts have been particularly influential in ensuring that research-based assessments remain valid indicators of student potential, while also adapting to the changing needs of higher education globally. His work has focused on the intersection of assessment and student success, highlighting the role of standardized testing in supporting equitable access to education. Acereda is also known for his continuous advocacy for innovation through the integration of technology in education and assessment, emphasizing how digital tools can enhance learning outcomes and provide more accurate measures of student abilities. In 2021, Acereda published an opinion article in Inside Higher Ed defending the use of standardized assessments in graduate admissions, while advocating for inclusive and equitable approaches. In a 2023 interview with BW Education, Acereda discussed the adaptability of the GRE and its continued relevance in promoting access to graduate education for diverse global applicants.

At Arizona State University he worked at the College of Liberal Arts and Sciences and received significant experience with curriculum policy, development, and program review. He led a top undergraduate and graduate academic unit at Arizona State University and also directed several other graduate programs within the School of International Letters and Cultures and working directly with the dean of the College of Liberal Arts and Sciences, the dean of the graduate college, and the provost office. He also led projects on academic excellence for faculty in the midst of an innovative model in higher education called the "New American University." He was part of several university-wide curriculum and academic policy committees, such as the Tenure and Promotion Review, the Curriculum and Academic Programs and others. Acereda was also the president of the Faculty Academic Senate in the largest college at Arizona State. His work at Territorium dealt with the larger picture and the possible solutions to the challenges faced in higher education in the United States and globally, particularly in the intersection from high school to higher education and into the workforce. Acereda has been involved in different initiatives to explore the changing directions in undergraduate and graduate education, the importance of faculty support and development, strategic planning and all the issues related to academic program review and its links to student learning outcomes and college success.

=== Studies on Hispanic Modernism and Rubén Dario ===
He has made important scholarly contributions to Hispanic literary modernism and has done extensive research on the end of the 19th century Hispanic. In this area, Acereda has studied the figure of the Nicaraguan poet Rubén Darío, writing several scholarly books such as Ruben Dario and the Poetics of Despair and Rubén Darío, poeta trágico. He has also coordinated and compiled several papers on this modernist author, such as his work The Other Centennial (El otro centenario): Rubén Darío y "Cantos de vida y esperanza" (Rubén Darío and "Songs of Life and Hope"), published in 2005 or "Homenaje a Rubén Darío." He also wrote two volumes of English translations of the poetry of Rubén Darío, prepared with U.S. researcher Professor Will Derusha: Songs of Life and Hope. Rubén Darío, and Selected Poems of Rubén Darío. A Bilingual Anthology. In 2005 he received the "International Rubén Darío Research Award" from the Universidad Nacional Autónoma de Nicaragua and he was also honored with the "Distinguished Research Recognition" by the "Nicaraguan Institute of Hispanic Culture" at the Embassy of Spain in Nicaragua, and by the "Nicaraguan Royal Academy of the Spanish Language".

=== Other areas of literature ===
In other areas of literature, Acereda has published extensively and his research has appeared in different research journals around the world. He is also the author of two books on other areas of Hispanic literary historiography: The Marquesa de Fuerte-Hijar. A Writer of the Enlightenment and The Poetic Language of Miguel Hernández). His most recent books include: Rubén Darío y el proyecto liberal modernista (2012); El antimodernismo. Debates transatlánticos en el fin de siglo (2011); Modernism, Rubén Darío and the Poetics of Despair (2004); La Marquesa de Fuerte-Híjar. Una dramaturga de la Ilustración. (2000). He is also the author of six book editions related to modernista authors that appeared in Hiperión, Visor, Sudamericana and other important publishers. He is also the author of two book translations of Darío's poetry (Duke UP and Bucknell UP), and four edited monographs on Modernism and Dario.

He has published over eighty scholarly articles in refereed journals such as Insula, Revista de Literatura (CSIC), Revista de Filología Románica, Romance Notes, Bulletin of Spanish Studies, Romance Quarterly, Hispanófila, Cuadernos Americanos, Hispania, Anales de Literatura Hispanoamericana, Hispanic Journal, Hispanófila, Dieciocho... He has authored multiple book reviews, several book chapters and encyclopedia entries. Acereda serves on the editorial board of several scholarly journals and is the editor of Journal of Hispanic Modernism and its literary review "Magazine Modernista". He has evaluated book manuscripts for university presses at ivy league institutions and sits on several editorial boards. He has conducted funded research in Nicaragua, Spain and England, and has been an invited honorary program director for the Universidad Internacional Menéndez Pelayo in Santander (Spain) (2008).

Apart from his profession and his university and literary research and teaching, Acereda is also general editor of two magazines dedicated to the fin de siecle Transatlantic Modernism: the digital magazine Magazine Modernista and Journal of Hispanic Modernism, review of research on Modernism. Some of his publications focus on textual representation of social and political issues, human rights, and ideology. His current research concerns the intersection of literature, journalism and politics and the social space in Modern Latin America and Spain. His broad research interests are in literary studies and comparative representations of spirituality and the politics of text within the Hispanic world. His research uses a strong philological and theoretical background to expand his literary and cultural analysis of texts as a product of humanistic, anthropological and social constructs. He has done extensive research on the connections of literature and social politics in the Hispanic world. Acereda has written extensively on Latin American and Spanish poetics, its connections to social issues such as human rights and he has held teaching appointments in Spain and the United States.

== Books and editions published ==
- New Directions: Assessment and Preparation of Hispanic College Students.
- Moving Forward: Policies, Planning, and Promoting Access of Hispanic College Students.
- Modernism, Rubén Darío and the Poetics of Despair
- Rubén Darío: Poeta trágico. Una nueva visión (Ruben Dario: tragic poet. A new vision)
- El Modernismo poético. Estudio crítico y antología temática (Poetic Modernism. Critical study and thematic anthology)
- Poemas filosóficos de Rubén Darío (Philosophical poems of Rubén Darío)
- Una sed de ilusiones infinita (An endless thirst for dreams)
- Poesía erótica de Rubén Darío (Erotic poetry of Ruben Dario)
- Poesía selecta de Rubén Darío (Poetry of Rubén Darío selected)
- Antología poética de Rubén Darío (Anthology poetry of Ruben Dario)
- Dossier Rubén Darío
- Homenaje a Rubén Darío (Tribute to Ruben Dario)
- El otro centenario: Rubén Darío y "Cantos de vida y esperanza" (The other anniversary: Rubén Darío and "Songs of Life and Hope")
- Songs of Life and Hope. Cantos de vida y esperanza. Rubén Darío
- Selected Poems of Rubén Darío. A Bilingual Anthology
- La Marquesa de Fuerte-Híjar. Una dramaturga de la Ilustración (The Marquesa de Fuerte-Hijar. A playwright of the Enlightenment)
- El lenguaje poético de Miguel Hernández. El rayo que no cesa (The poetic language of Miguel Hernandez. The ray that does not stop).
