= Alberto Esteva Salinas =

Mexican politician (born 1964)

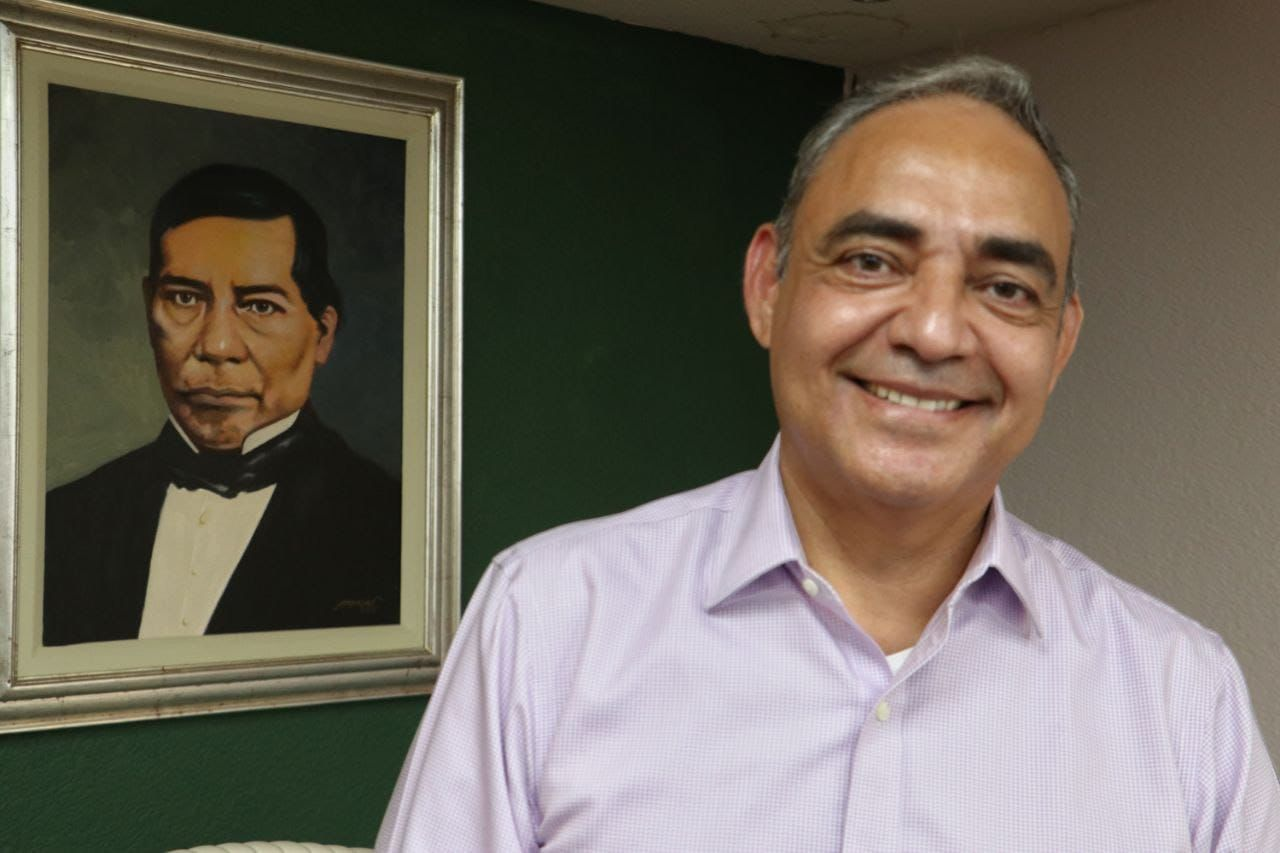
- Salinas in 2021
- Born: 28 November 1964 (age 61); Oaxaca, Mexico
- Occupation: Politician
- Political party: MC

Alberto Esteva Salinas (born 28 November 1964) is a Mexican politician from the Citizens' Movement. From 2006 to 2009, he served as Deputy of the LX Legislature of the Mexican Congress representing Oaxaca.
