= Alberto de Noronha =

Indian writer (1920–2006)

Alberto de Noronha (3 October 1920 – 19 October 2006) was a Goan writer and translator.

Noronha's career was as a school teacher, then as a government official; he retired as a deputy director of the department of statistics in Goa.

He translated a collection of short stories written in Marathi, Konkani and English under the title Onde o Moruoni Canta: Contos Goeses (Panjim, Goa: Third Millennium, 2003). It includes stories by Damodar Mauzo, Olivinho Gomes, Uday Bhembré, Laxmanrao Sardessai, Armando Menezes and Victor Rangel-Ribeiro, amongst others.

He wrote The Third Culture: Some Aspects of the Indo-Portuguese Cultural Encounter (Panjim: Third Millennium, 2006).
