= Alberto Bienvenú =

Mexican basketball player (1916–2004)

Personal information
- Born: 23 October 1916; Mexico City, Mexico
- Died: 24 January 2004 (aged 87); Mexico City, Mexico

Sport
- Sport: Basketball

Alberto Bienvenú (23 October 1916 – 24 January 2004) was a Mexican basketball player. He competed in the men's tournament at the 1948 Summer Olympics.
