= Alberto Disera =

Argentine field hockey player

Personal information
- Born: 17 June 1942 (age 83) Buenos Aires, Argentina

Sport
- Sport: Field hockey

Alberto Disera (born 17 June 1942) is an Argentine field hockey player. He competed in the men's tournament at the 1968 Summer Olympics.
