= Alberto Paulino =

Angolan politician

Alberto Paulino is an Angolan politician for MPLA and a member of the National Assembly of Angola. He took office in 2017 and was the secretary of the local committee from January 1st, 1993 to December 31st, 1993. He also was the Provincial Secretary for JURA mobilization from January 1st, 2007 to December 31st, 200, as well as the Provincial Secretary from January 1st, 2014 to December 31st, 2014.
