= Alberto Borghetti =

Italian electrical engineer

Alberto Borghetti (born 29 May 1967 in Cesena) is an Italian electrical engineer and a professor in the Department of Electrical, Electronic, and Information Engineering "Guglielmo Marconi" of the University of Bologna, Italy. He was named Fellow of the Institute of Electrical and Electronics Engineers (IEEE) in 2015 for contributions to modeling of power distribution systems under transient conditions.
