= Alberto Fortes =

Spanish chef

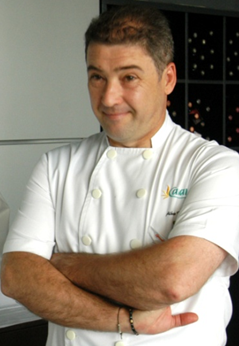
- Born: Juan Alberto Fortes Gutiérrez; 1958 (age 67–68); Mallorca, Spain
- Occupation: Chef
- Website: Official website

Juan Alberto Fortes Gutiérrez, known as Alberto Fortes, is a Spanish author and chef residing in Frankfurt, Germany.

Fortes combines his professional activity with the promotion of Spanish culture and gastronomy. He participates in food festivals, seminars, workshops, lectures and conferences and international promotional events. Promoting healthy eating habits, his work is based on nutrition research and culinary creativity, combining the Mediterranean diet with the Japanese diet. He also works on creating new products or healthy foods, often with the use of extra virgin olive oil.

Fortes contributed articles and photographs to newspapers and wrote books about art and gastronomy. He collaborates with internationally renowned architects and takes an active role in the design of furniture, dinnerware and clothes.

== Biography ==
Fortes is a recognized chef who worked with several of the best Spanish and international chefs. In 2002 he gave up his work as an art expert and other business activities to focus on cooking; opening his first restaurant, La Folia, in Madrid .

La Folia gained recognition and international prestige. It collaborates with food festivals around the world. It works with some of the most recognized international chefs and collaborates in different radio and television programs.

== Awards ==
In 2004 the Canarian Government recognized his job in the international promotion and circulation of Canary gastronomie and culture. It designated him responsible for representing and circulating the gastronomic culture and food of Canary in the Canarias Crea 04 program (Madrid 2004) about the circulation of the culture and creative canarian authors at worldwide level.

In 2007 he received an institutional and business recognition of Ciudad Rodrigo (Salamanca) for his professional work as responsible author of the “Posada Real Palacio”, “Maldonado de Chaves” and the “Celso Lagar Restaurant”. The award was also for his contribution to promoting the city during the “Las Edades del Hombre” in 2006.

In 2014 he was selected by FAO and Peru among the other distinguished chefs as one of the best worldwide chefs to represent Germany in the international cookery book of quinua in Madrid Fusión.

== Books ==
- 1984 Cookery book : Con Pan por Alberto Fortes
- 1992 Cookery book: Los mejores restaurantes de Tenerife
- 1994 Catalog book: Maestros del Grabado en España: de Goya a Picasso
- 1998 Catalogue Raisonné: Pintores españoles de la Escuela de París
- 1999 Catalogue Raisonné: Ismael Gonzáles de la Serna
- 1999 Catalogue: Emilio Machado I v II El Sentido de la Vida y Guitarras
- 1998 Catalogue: Facundo Fierro Las Naves Quemadas
- 2002 Cookery book La Cocina de Navidad por Alberto Fortes (Delaviuda)
- 2006 a 2007 Contributor with a weekly gastronomie page in La Voz De Miróbriga (Ciudad Rodrigo Salamanca) newspaper.
- 2006 a 2007 Contributor with a weekly gastronomie page in El Adelanto (Salamanca) newspaper.
- 2006 a 2007 Regular contributor with own gastronomie and cook program in Onda Cero radio (Ciudad Rodrigo - Salamanca)
- 2008 a 2010 writer of a monthly column on gastronomy and cuisine for in Go for More (Schwäbisch Gmünd - Alemania) magazine.
- 2008 a 2013 Habitual contributor in La Voz de Miróbriga newspaper (Ciudad Rodrigo - Salamanca)
- 2009 a 2013 Contributes regularly in the international magazine ECOS of España and Latinoamérica (con sede en Múnich - Alemania)
- 2008 a 2013 Regular contributor in La Voz de Miróbriga newspaper (Ciudad Rodrigo - Salamanca)
- 2013 Starts collaborating in El Día newspaper in the gastronomie section (Tenerife - España)
- 2013 Named press correspondent for German, Switzerland and Austria by the Spanish gastronomie magazine El Trotamanteles
- 2013 Book: La Cocina Cardiosaludable de Alberto Fortes (ongoing)
- 2013 Book: Cocina fácil, económica y sana para toda la familia . Menús por menos de 1 euro. Alberto Fortes (ongoing)
