= Alberto Milian =

American lawyer and judge from Florida (born 1960)

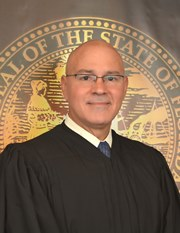

Judge of the Eleventh Judicial Circuit Court of Florida
- Incumbent
- Assumed office January 6, 2015

Personal details
- Born: November 12, 1960 (age 65)
- Education: Florida International University (BA); Florida State University (JD)

Alberto Milian (born November 12, 1960) is a Cuban-American soldier, lawyer and judge from Florida. He is a judge in the criminal division of the Eleventh Judicial Circuit Court of Florida.

He won the primary election on August 26, 2014, receiving 57.9 percent of the vote, and assumed office on January 6, 2015. He was re-elected in 2020; his term expires on January 5, 2027.

Milian is the son of celebrated Cuban journalist Emilio Milian.

== Education ==
Milian earned his Bachelor of Arts in public administration from Florida International University in 1983 and his Juris Doctor from the Florida State University College of Law.

== Military Service ==
Milian served in the U.S. Army as both an enlisted man and as a commissioned officer attaining the rank of captain.

A graduate of Officer Candidate School, Milian also earned his parachutist wings at Fort Benning, Georgia. Originally commissioned as an Infantry officer he later transferred to military intelligence and completed the basic and advanced courses. He also completed the Strategic Interrogator and Counterintelligence courses.

Milian is a veteran of two conflicts: Operation Just Cause (Panama) and Operation Desert Shield/Storm (Persian Gulf War). In both conflicts he served under the command of legendary intelligence officer Colonel Stuart A. Herrington.

His military decorations include the Bronze Star, Meritorious Service Medal, National Defense Service Medal, Army Achievement Medal, Armed Forces Expeditionary Medal, Southwest Asia Service Medal Saudi Arabia Liberation Medal, Kuwait Liberation Medal, as well as the Parachutist and M-16 Expert Qualification Badges.

Milian also received a Central Intelligence Agency Director's citation for exceptional service during a time of hostilities.

== Career ==
- 2015–2021: Judge, Eleventh Circuit Court
- 2000–2014: Criminal defense attorney
- 1988–2000: Prosecutor, Broward County State Attorney's Office
- 1994–2000: Career Criminal Unit

== Footnotes ==
1. ↑ See Judicial selection in Florida.
2. ↑ Florida Secretary of State, “Candidate Listing for 2014 General Election,” accessed May 5, 2014
3. ↑ Miami Herald, "Two incumbent Miami-Dade judges lose; Miami assistant city attorney wins seat," August 27, 2014
4. ↑ ^{7.0} ^{7.1} ^{7.2} St. Petersburg Times, "His father's voice," December 5, 2002
5. ↑ ^{9.0} ^{9.1} ^{9.2} ^{9.3} ^{9.4} Beached Miami, "Miamians: Alberto Milian, son of Miami terrorism victim," October 18, 2010
6. ↑ ^{10.0} ^{10.1} ^{10.2} Daily Business Review, "Group 27: Alberto Milian and Mary Gomez," August 8, 2014
