= Alberto Egea =

Venezuelan artist

- Born: 29 August 1901; Caracas, Venezuela
- Died: 13 December 1958 (aged 57); Tenerife, Spain
- Occupation: Artist

Alberto Egea (29 August 1901 – 13 December 1958) was a Venezuelan watercolor painter, cartoonist, and illustrator. His work was part of the art competition at the 1932 Summer Olympics.

In 1923, Egea fled to the United States to avoid the dictatorship of Juan Vicente Gómez before returning to Venezuela in 1933. He was arrested in 1954 for criticizing the dictatorship of Marcos Pérez Jiménez and died a few years later in 1958.
