= Alberto Diamante =

Italian Canadian film professional

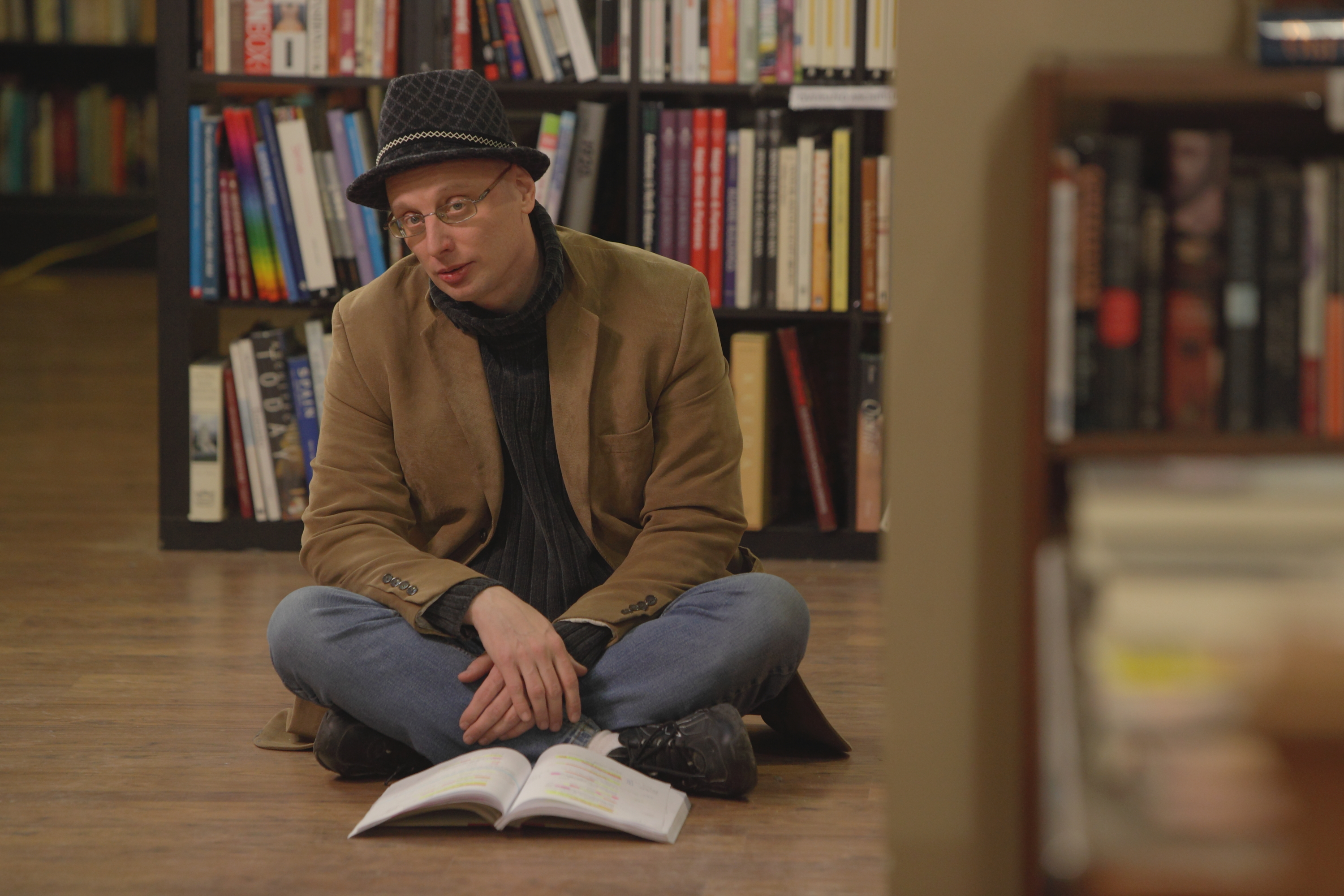
Alberto Diamante on the set of "The Bookstore."

Alberto Diamante (born in 1970) is an Italian-Canadian screenwriter, film director, photographer, actor, certified Italian interpreter, film editor and award-winning cinematographer.

He has written and directed four feature films, "Rattlesnake Point," "Ulysses," "Love… and Other Reasons to Panic" and "The Bookstore." The latter was presented at the 2016 Italian Contemporary Film Festival. He has also starred in "Ulysses" and "The Bookstore." He edited "Love…and other reasons to panic."

"Rattlesnake Point" has received numerous accolades at various film festivals around the world.

Diamante graduated from York University with a degree in English and Film. He went on to direct a few short films before venturing into features.

His screenplay, Skin, was a finalist at several international screenwriting competitions, including in London and New York City.

He is a fully accredited Italian court interpreter and has interpreted for many Italian filmmakers at the Toronto International Film Festival, including Nanni Moretti, Gabriele Salvatores, Roberto Benigni, Carlo Verdone, Paolo Sorrentino and many others.

He speaks Italian, English and French.
