= Alberto Cavaciocchi =

Italian General and military historian

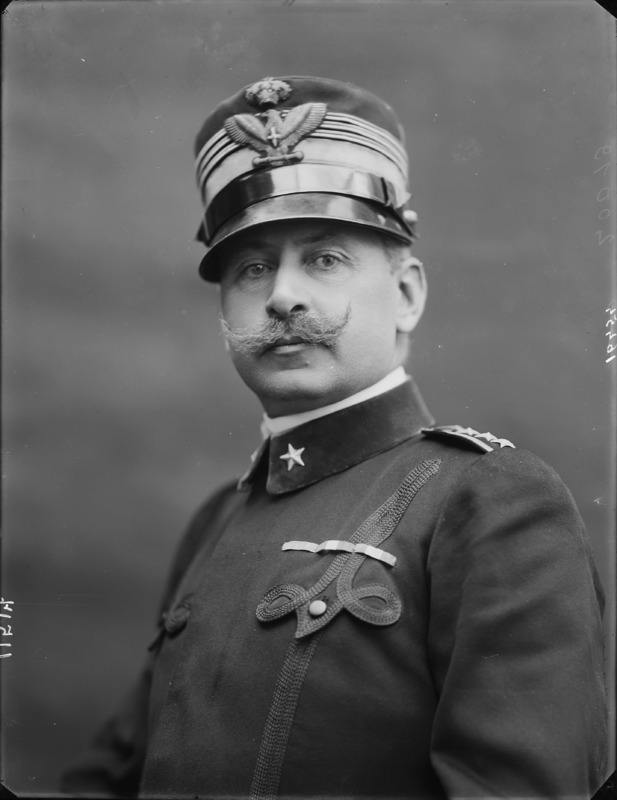
- Born: 31 January 1862; Turin, Italy
- Died: 3 May 1925 (aged 63); Turin, Italy
- Occupation: General

Alberto Cavaciocchi (31 January 1862 - 3 May 1925) was an Italian general and military historian.

== Life and career ==
Born in Turin, after attending the Military College of Florence Cavaciocchi graduated from the Military Academy of Turin as a second lieutenant of artillery. He later enrolled at the Turin War School, being promoted to the rank of captain in 1888. Promoted to colonel, he led the 60th Infantry Regiment during the Italo-Turkish War, and was decorated with the Cross of Officer of the Military Order of Savoy and the Silver Medal of Military Valor.

During World War I, after some brilliant operations, he was involved in the disastrous Italian defeat in the Battle of Caporetto, when the IV Army Corps he commanded rapidly collapsed. In 1919 the Ministerial Commission of Enquiry established by Francesco Saverio Nitti considered him as one of the most responsible of the defeat and forced him to retire.

Beyond his military activity, Cavaciocchi is known as a researcher and an author of books and journal articles about Italian and European military history. Among his most important works, the reference book Le istituzioni militari del Regno d'Italia ("The military institutions of the Kingdom of Italy", 1906). Between 1906 and 1910 he was chief of the Italian Army History Office, and during this time he oversaw the publication of the official reports of the Risorgimento campaigns and the creation of the journal Memorie storiche militari ("Military Historical Memoirs").
