= Alberto Del Guerra =

Alberto Del Guerra from the University of Pisa, Pisa, Italy was named Fellow of the Institute of Electrical and Electronics Engineers (IEEE) in 2012 for contributions to radiation detectors and systems for medical physics and molecular imaging.
