= Alberto Pappafava =

Italian painter (1832–1929)

Count Alberto Pappafava or Pappafava dei Carraresi (1832-1929) was an Italian painter, mainly of Romantic style landscapes, in watercolor and oil.

== Biography ==
He depicted vistas of his extensive travels. Among his works are: Dintorni di Salisburgo; Dintorni di Lecco; Villagio in montagna; Via alla Chiesa; Altura; and Paesaggio lombardo. Among his paintings in maiolica are Interno di una casa; Laguna; Palude al tramonto and Sera. He was named Honorary Academic of the Royal Academy of Fine Arts of Venice. In his family's ancient domain in Frassanelle, he decided to create a natural landscape park, complete with artificial grottoes. His son Francesco Papafava was an economist and political writer.
