= Alberto Caramella =

Italian poet

Alberto Caramella (1928–2007) spent all his life in Florence. He was an Italian poet. His first poetic works were published in 1995 after a successful career as a lawyer. In 1997, he founded the "Fondazione il Fiore" in Florence, with the aim of promoting Italian and international poetry.

== Bibliography ==
- Mille scuse per esistere, Florence: Le Lettere, 1995
- I viaggi del Nautilus, Florence: Le Lettere, 1997
- Lunares murales, Florence: Le Lettere, 1999
- Il soggetto è il mare (il libro dei nodi), Varese: Edizioni Stampa, 2000
- Interrogazione di poesia, Milan: Crocetti, 2000
- Cartella di vacanza (sur le Lac Léman), Florence: Edizioni Polistampa, 2000
- Festa di Vivere i Mostri del Moto, Florence: Edizioni Artichaut, 2001
- Poesie, a cura di C. Mariotti, Firenze, Polistampa, 2003
- Pulizia, o del percezionismo, Florence: Passigli Editore, 2004
- Il Libro Liberato, Florence: Passigli Editore, 2005.

== Studies about Caramella's poetry ==
- E. Giachery-N. Paolini Giachery, "Pas de deux": per la poesia di Alberto Caramella, Roma, Vecchiarelli, 2000
- Il frale nerbo: per Alberto Caramella. Atti della giornata di studi Bologna 5 ottobre 2001, a cura di F. Sberlati, Roma, Bulzoni, 2002 (contributi di F. Sberlati, A. Noferi, E. Giachery, A. Oldcorn, J.-Ch. Vegliante, M. Cucchi, L. Tassoni)
- G. Occhipinti, La voce della poesia, Panzano, Edizioni Feeria, 2004
- A. Guastella, Alberto Caramella poeta egizio & lunare in Studi cattolici, Luglio/Agosto 1999, pp. 530–33.
- Alberto Caramella. La tensione e il sogno, intervista di I. Boni in Galatea, Luglio/Agosto 1998, pp. 54–61
- Alberto Caramella, intervista di S. Gros-Pietro in Vernice, a. VII n. 19-20, pp. 6–20.
- C. Mariotti, Sulla scrittura aforistica di Alberto Caramella, in Caffè Michelangiolo, a. X n. 3, Settembre-Dicembre 2005, pp. 81–83.
- C. Mariotti, Sullo straripante amore di Alberto Caramella, in Feeria, a. XIV n. 29, Giugno 2006, pp. 54–58.
