= Alberto Fiumicetti =

Italian football player (born 2000)

Personal information
- Date of birth: 13 July 2000 (age 26)
- Place of birth: Soave, Italy
- Height: 1.85 m (6 ft 1 in)
- Position: Forward

Youth career
- –2019: Verona

Senior career*
Years	Team	Apps	(Gls)
2019–2020	Verona	0	(0)
2019–2020	→ Fermana (loan)	3	(0)
2020	→ Mantova (loan)	2	(0)
- * Club domestic league appearances and goals as of 16 February 2020

Alberto Fiumicetti (born 13 July 2000) is an Italian football player.

== Club career ==
=== Verona ===
He is the product of Verona youth teams and played for their Under-19 squad. He has not received any call-ups to the senior squad by the end of the 2018–19 season.

==== Loan to Fermana ====
On 26 July 2019 he joined Serie C club Fermana on loan.

He made his professional Serie C debut for Fermana on 25 August 2019 in a game against Ravenna. He substituted Luca Cognigni in the 82nd minute.

On 13 January 2020, Fermana terminated the loan early. He ended the loan with 3 league appearances, all as a substitute.

==== Loan to Mantova ====
On 14 January 2020 he was loaned to Serie D club Mantova.
