= Alberto Alessi =

Italian politician (1939–2022)

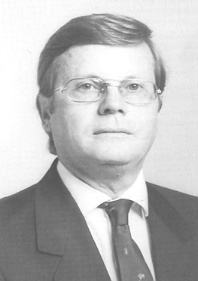

Member of the Chamber of Deputies of Italy
- In office 28 June 1987 – 14 April 1994
- Constituency: Palermo
- In office 3 December 1981 – 11 July 1983
- Constituency: Palermo

Personal details
- Born: 30 May 1939 Caltanissetta, Italy
- Died: 12 December 2022 (aged 83) Rome, Italy
- Party: DC; CCD
- Occupation: Lawyer

Alberto Alessi (30 May 1939 – 12 December 2022) was an Italian lawyer and politician. A member of the Christian Democracy party, he served in the Chamber of Deputies from 1981 to 1983 and again from 1987 to 1994. He died in Rome at the age of 83.
