= Albert Fay =

Albert Fay may refer to:

- Albert Fay (footballer), Uruguayan-born Salvadoran footballer
- Albert B. Fay, American businessman and politician
