= Alberto Aleman =

Panamian business executive

Alberto Alemán Zubieta (born c. 1951) is a former administrator of the Panama Canal. He graduated from Texas A&M University in civil and industrial engineering in 1973. He lives in Panama with his wife, Ana Matilde, and their three children.

== Awards ==
- "William Ross Medal", presented in 1992 by the Panamanian Chamber of Construction (CAPAC)
- "Honorary Fellow" in 1997 and "Federal Engineer of the Year Award" from the American Society of Civil Engineers
- "Florencio Icaza Award" bestowed by the Association of Panamanian Architects and Engineers (SPIA)
- "Maritime Personality 2001" Award, presented by Seatrade
- "The Business man of the Year 2002" from the Panamanian Business Executives Association (APEDE)
- "Outstanding International Alumnus Award of Texas A&M University" awarded in December 2003
