= Alberto Pappiani =

Italian mathematician and astronomer

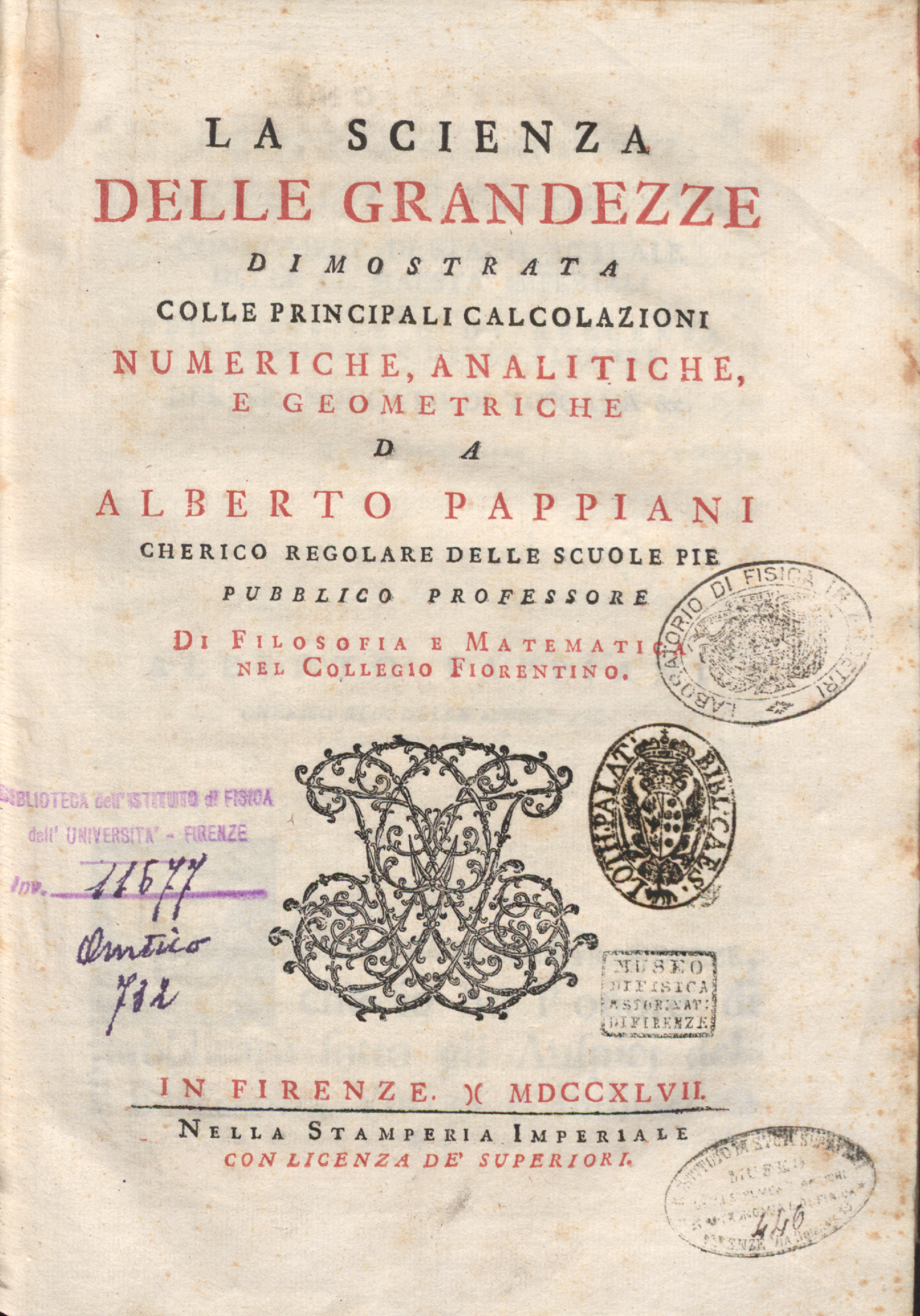
Title page of the Scienza delle grandezze (1747)

Alberto Pappiani (1709–1790) was an Italian mathematician, astronomer, and theologian.

He was a Piarist priest and teacher of philosophy and mathematics in the Florentine College.

In 1758, he became president of the Academy of Dogmatic Theologians in Florence.

== Works ==
- Della sfera armillare e dell'uso di essa nella astronomia nautica e gnomonica (in Italian). Florence: Andrea Bonducci. 1745.
- La scienza delle grandezze: dimostrata colle principali calcolazioni numeriche, analitiche, e geometriche (in Italian). Florence: Stamperia Imperiale. 1747.
- Doctrina christiana de sacrosanctis ecclesiæ sacramentis ab heterodoxorum erroribus vindicata (in Latin). Vol. 1. Florence: Domenico Marzi. 1771.
- Doctrina christiana de sacrosanctis ecclesiæ sacramentis ab heterodoxorum erroribus vindicata (in Latin). Vol. 2. Florence: Domenico Marzi. 1772.
- Principj di morale cristiana: che possono servire per istruzione di qualunque persona che voglia a grado a grado e con fondamento ammaestrarsi nella direzione della propria e dell'altrui coscienza (in Italian). Vol. 1. Florence: Francesco Allegrini. 1780.
