= Alberto Arredondo Gutiérrez =

Cuban journalist and economist

- Born: August 28, 1912; Havana, Cuba
- Died: April 17, 1968 (aged 55); Miami, Florida
- Occupations: Economist, journalist

Alberto Arredondo Gutiérrez (August 28, 1912 – April 17, 1968) was a Cuban journalist and economist.

== Biography ==
The son of Rafael Arredondo and Leonor Gutiérrez Betancourt, Alberto Arredondo Gutiérrez was a journalist and economist born in Havana, Cuba. Arredondo owned the daily newspaper Mañana in Havana and was active in the study of Cuba's economy, focusing especially on agriculture. For several years he was in charge of the economic section of the Cuban newspaper Avance. He was a regular contributor for the Cuban international magazine Bohemia. Arredondo served as head of the Departamento de Economía Interna of the Consejo Nacional de Economía in 1958 and, later, as the Cuban delegate to the VII Inter-American Conference on Agriculture and the VI Conference of the Pan American Institute of Geography and History. He also served as an economic advisor to the Comisión de Fomento Nacional of Cuba and as the director of economic research for the Confederación de Trabajadores del Cuba (CTC).

In Havana, during the 1940s and 1950s, Arredondo was the President of the INRE Review (Review of the National Institute of Economic Reform); Economic Advisor for the Agricultural and Industrial Development Bank of Cuba (BANFAIC), and consultant for BANFAIC's president, Amadeo López Castro. He was also advisor and director of the Central Board of Economy, and economic advisor for the Confederation of Workers of Cuba (CTC, Confederación de Trabajadores de Cuba).

In 1960, Arredondo went into exile. After arriving in the United States, he moved to the Dominican Republic where he was a professor of agricultural economics at the Centro Interamericano de Estudios Económicos y Sociales (CIDES) in Santo Domingo from 1963 to 1964. He later came back to Miami, where he remained active in several professional and political organizations. He also worked as a researcher for the Cuban Economics Research Project at the University of Miami.

Arredondo authored several conference papers, economic studies, and books. Some of his works include El negro en Cuba, ensayo (1939), Blitzkrieg!: facetas de la Alemania actual, según los relatos del alemán Karl Dochtmann (1942), Cuba, tierra indefensa (1945), and La historia secreta del comunismo cubano y sus purgas (1965).

Arredondo died in Miami on April 17, 1968. He was survived by his wife Ela Pantaleón and some of his brothers and sisters (Rafael Arredondo, Armando Arredondo, Carmen Arredondo, Laura Arredondo, Leonor Arredondo de Viada, mother of Cuban-American Economist Luis Viada, and Gabriela Arredondo, mother of Cuban writer Rita Martin.

== Publications ==
- La guerra de 1879, nuevos esclarecimientos. Paris: La vda de C. Bouret. 1920. OCLC 83031687.
- Batista, un año de gobierno, crónicas de una etapa febril. Prólogo de Antonio d'Torra. La Habana: Úcar, García y ca. OCLC 7950659.
- El negro en Cuba, ensayo. La Habana: Editorial "Alfa". 1939. OCLC 8807724.
- Nacimiento y vida del café en Cuba. La Habana. 1940s.
- Blitzkrieg! : facetas de la Alemania actual, según los relatos del alemán Karl Dochtmann. La Habana: [publisher not identified]. 1942. OCLC 17123428.
- Como cumple Batista su plataforma de gobierno. La Habana: Prensa Indoamericana. 1943. OCLC 12185566.
- Crédito-banca-moneda, "bases para la banca nacional". La Habana: Editorial Lex. 1947. ISBN 9789754282832. OCLC 42043770.
- El negro cubano socio-economicamente considerado. La Habana: [publisher not identified]. 1958. ISBN 9789754282832. OCLC 2376246.
- La cuestión de la tierra. v. 3. México: Centro de Estudios y Documentación Sociales. 1963. ISBN 9789754282832. OCLC 24893709.
- La cuestión de la tierra. México. 1963. OCLC 1708348.
- La cuestión de la tierra. México: Centro de Estudios y Documentación Sociales. 1964. ISBN 9789754282832. OCLC 3338341.
- La cuestión de la tierra. III, Las reformas agrarias en el mundo. México: Centro de Estudios y Documentación Sociales. 1963. ISBN 9789754282832. OCLC 493235684.
- La cuestión de la tierra. II, Agrarismo y desarrollo. México: Centro de Estudios y Documentación Sociales. 1963. ISBN 9789754282832. OCLC 493235563.
- La cuestión de la tierra. I, Economía agraria. México: Centro de Estudios y Documentación Sociales. 1964. ISBN 9789754282832. OCLC 493234865.
- Estudio comparativo de las reformas agrarias en América: México, Venezuela, Cuba. Caracas: [Instituto Agrario Nacional, Servicio de Divulgación]. 1965. ISBN 9789754282832. OCLC 19339786.
- La historia secreta del comunismo cubano y sus purgas. Miami: [Editorial AIP]. 2004. ISBN 9789754282832. OCLC 1214622.
- La realidad social de Centroamérica: El asombro del istmo. México: Centro de Estudios y Documentación Sociales. 1965. OCLC 2104110.
- Reforma agraria. (La experiencia cubana). Río Piedras: Editorial San Juan. 1969. ISBN 9789754282832. OCLC 554917.
- Stages and Problems of Industrial Development in Cuba. Miami: The Project. 1965. ISBN 9789754282832. OCLC 5777494.
- Sugar in Cuba. Coral Gables, Fla.: Cuban Economic Research Project, University of Miami. 1965. ISBN 9789754282832. OCLC 2463374.
