= Alberto Ascoli =

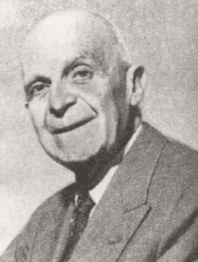
- Alberto Ascoli
- Born: Alberto Ascoli; 15 August 1877
- Died: 28 September 1957 (aged 80)

Alberto Ascoli (August 15, 1877, in Trieste – September 28, 1957) was an Italian serologist, hygienist and physiological chemist, who developed a test for anthrax.
