= Alberto Arnone =

Italian painter

Alberto Arnone (Born in Naples in 17th century, died 1721) was an Italian painter, active in a late-Baroque style.

He first studied with Luca Giordano in Naples, then in Rome with Carlo Maratta. He excelled in portraiture.
