= Alberto Montejo =

Spanish footballer

Personal information
- Full name: Alberto Montejo Gañán
- Date of birth: 19 January 1988 (age 38)
- Place of birth: Zaragoza, Spain
- Height: 1.66 m (5 ft 5 in)
- Position: Midfielder

Team information
- Current team: Brea

Youth career
- Zaragoza

Senior career*
Years	Team	Apps	(Gls)
2007–2010	Zaragoza B	34	(2)
2008	Zaragoza	1	(0)
2008–2009	→ Numancia B (loan)	32	(5)
2010–2011	La Muela	8	(1)
2011–2013	Robres	?	(7)
2014	Teruel	?	(2)
2014–2016	Montecarlo		
2016–	Brea	?	(6)

International career
2004	Spain U16	3	(1)
2004–2005	Spain U17	7	(1)
- * Club domestic league appearances and goals as of 14 May 2017

Alberto Montejo Gañán (born 19 January 1988 in Zaragoza, Aragon) is a Spanish footballer who plays for CD Brea as a midfielder.
