= Alberto Carrillo Armenta =

Mexican politician (born 1954)

Alberto Marcos Carrillo Armenta (born 1954, Guadalajara, Jalisco) is a Mexican politician, Member of Parliament 1991-1994.

Carrillo Armenta studied Communication Sciences at ITESO, and worked as a teacher at the institution in the 1970s. He was a member of the Socialist Workers Party (PST). Between 1980 and 1982 he was the chairman of the Jalisco State Executive Committee of the party. He was also a member of the national leadership of the party. He was elected to the federal parliament in 1991, as a Party of the Cardenist Front of National Reconstruction (PCFRN) candidate. In parliament he led the PFCRN faction. He was also the director of the party organ Insurgencia Cardenista.
