= Alberto Cerioni =

Argentine footballer

Personal information
- Full name: Pablo Alberto Cerioni
- Date of birth: October 1, 1919
- Place of birth: La Plata, Argentina
- Date of death: 1948
- Position: Midfielder

Senior career*
Years	Team	Apps	(Gls)
1938–1944	Gimnasia y Esgrima La Plata	87	(35)
1945–1946	Nacional		
1946–1947	Internazionale	16	(4)
1947–1948	Nacional		
- * Club domestic league appearances and goals

Pablo Alberto Cerioni, known as Alberto Cerioni, Paolo Cerioni or Alberto Paolo Cerioni (October 1, 1919 – 1948) was an Argentine professional football player.

== Career ==
Cerioni began playing football with Gimnasia y Esgrima de La Plata, making his debut in a league match against San Lorenzo on 23 October 1938. He appeared in 87 league matches and scored 35 goals for Gimnasia during his career.

His brothers Enrique Cerioni and Héctor Cerioni also played football professionally.
