= 2006 Santos FC season =

Santos
2006 season
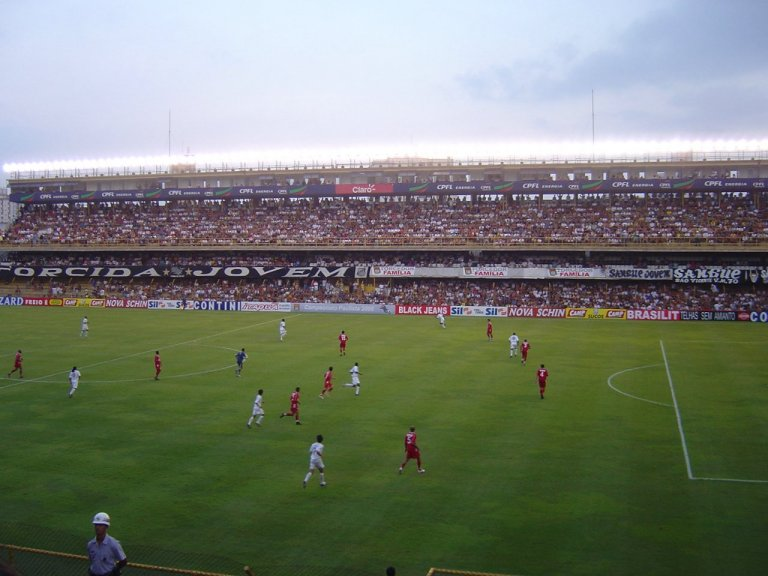
- Santos vs Mogi Mirim at the Vila Belmiro on 15 January
- President: Marcelo Teixeira
- Manager: Vanderlei Luxemburgo
- Stadium: Vila Belmiro
- Campeonato Brasileiro: 4th
- Campeonato Paulista: Winners
- Copa do Brasil: Quarter-finals
- Copa Sudamericana: Round of 16
- Top goalscorer: League: Wellington Paulista (9); All: Reinaldo (11)
Home colours	Away colours

The 2006 season was Santos Futebol Clube's ninety-fourth season in existence and the club's forty-seventh consecutive season in the top flight of Brazilian football.

This season, Santos announced the return of the manager Vanderlei Luxemburgo, who had left the club in the last season and failed at Real Madrid. On 9 April 2006, Santos won the Campeonato Paulista for sixteenth time in history, by beating Portuguesa 2–0 in the last match. On 31 August, they signed Brazilian midfielder Zé Roberto who was free agent since he left FC Bayern Munich, until June 2007. In the Campeonato Brasileiro, Santos ended in the 4th place, securing a place in the 2007 Copa Libertadores. In the Copa do Brasil, Santos were knocked out by Ipatinga in the quarter-finals. Santos also competed in the Copa Sudamericana, being eliminated in the round of 16 after a 1–3 loss on aggregate to San Lorenzo.

== Players ==
=== Squad ===
Note: Flags indicate national team as defined under FIFA eligibility rules; some limited exceptions apply. Players may hold more than one non-FIFA nationality.

No.	Pos.	Nation	Player
—	GK	BRA	Fábio Costa
—	GK	BRA	Felipe
—	GK	BRA	Roger
—	DF	BRA	Carlinhos
—	DF	BRA	Ávalos
—	DF	BRA	Dênis
—	DF	BRA	Domingos
—	DF	PAR	Manzur
—	DF	BRA	Kléber
—	DF	BRA	Luiz Alberto
—	DF	BRA	Paulo
—	DF	BRA	Ronaldo Guiaro
—	MF	BRA	André
—	MF	BRA	André Luiz
—	MF	CHI	Maldonado
—	MF	BRA	Cléber Santana

No.	Pos.	Nation	Player
—	MF	BRA	Fabinho
—	MF	BRA	Heleno
—	MF	BRA	Rodrigo Tabata
—	MF	BRA	Zé Roberto
—	FW	BRA	Geílson
—	FW	BRA	Jonas
—	FW	BRA	Leandro Rodrigues
—	FW	BRA	Reinaldo
—	FW	BRA	Renatinho
—	FW	BRA	Rodrigo Tiuí
—	FW	BRA	Wellington Paulista

=== Appearances and goals ===
				Total			Campeonato Brasileiro		Campeonato Paulista		Copa do Brasil		Copa Sudamericana	
No.	Pos.	Nat.	Name	Sts	App	Gls	App	Gls	App	Gls	App	Gls	App	Gls
	GK	(Brazil)	Fábio Costa	59	59		33		18		7		1	
	GK	(Brazil)	Felipe	8	9		6						3	
	GK	(Brazil)	Roger		1				1					
	DF	(Brazil)	Dênis	23	26	2	23	2					3	
	DF	(Brazil)	Paulo	4	4		1						3	
	DF	(Brazil)	Ávalos	10	12		11		1					
	DF	(Brazil)	Domingos	25	31	2	21	2	5		2		3	
	DF	(Paraguay)	Julio Manzur	47	50	2	24		16	2	7		3	
	DF	(Brazil)	Luiz Alberto	55	55	7	29	3	17	4	7		2	
	DF	(Brazil)	Ronaldo Guiaro	35	37		21		9		5		2	
	DF	(Brazil)	Carlinhos	8	17	1	13	1	1				3	
	DF	(Brazil)	Kléber	59	62	5	34	4	18		7	1	3	
	MF	(Brazil)	Adriano		1		1							
	MF	(Brazil)	André	16	28	2	24	1					4	1
	MF	(Brazil)	André Luiz	9	15		13						2	
	MF	(Brazil)	Heleno	23	31		19		4		4		4	
	MF	(Chile)	Maldonado	40	40		19		18		3			
	MF	(Brazil)	Cléber Santana	53	56	8	29	2	17	3	7	3	3	
	MF	(Brazil)	Rodrigo Tabata	44	63	10	36	8	18	2	5		4	
	MF	(Brazil)	Zé Roberto	12	13	3	12	3					1	
	FW	(Brazil)	Fabiano	2	4	3	4	3						
	FW	(Brazil)	Geílson	16	24	2	4		14	2	6			
	FW	(Brazil)	Jonas	18	25	5	15	1	6	4			4	
	FW	(Brazil)	Júnior		1	1	1	1						
	FW	(Brazil)	Leandro	4	12	1	10	1					2	
	FW	(Brazil)	Reinaldo	27	32	11	17	5	11	3	4	3		
	FW	(Brazil)	Renatinho		4		3		1					
	FW	(Brazil)	Rodrigo Tiuí	16	31	6	30	6					1	
	FW	(Brazil)	Wellington Paulista	27	35	10	30	9			1		4	1
Players who left the club during the season
	DF	(Brazil)	Fabinho	32	33	2	8		18	2	6		1	
	DF	(Brazil)	Neto	14	19		6		10		3			
	MF	(Brazil)	Gilmar		6		1		5					
	MF	(Brazil)	Giovanni	1	1				1					
	MF	(Brazil)	Léo Lima	12	27	8	5		15	5	7	3		
	MF	(Brazil)	Luciano Henrique	2	3	1			3	1				
	MF	(Brazil)	Magnum	7	23	4	5		11	3	7	1		
	MF	(Brazil)	Wendel	26	39	4	18	2	16	1	5	1		
	FW	(Brazil)	Cláudio Pitbull	1	1				1					
	FW	(Mexico)	De Nigris	2	5	1	2	1			3			
	FW	(Brazil)	Galvão	4	9		1		6		2			
	FW	(Brazil)	Luizão	1	1				1					

Last updated: 3 December 2006
Source: Match reports in competitive matches
Ordered by start team, game starts and position on pitch (from back right to front left)
0 shown as blank

== Transfers ==
=== In ===
P	Nat.	Name	Age	Moving from	Type	Source
DF	(Brazil)	Domingos	20	Grêmio	Loan return	
DF	(Brazil)	Neto	23	Paraná Clube	Signed	
FW	(Brazil)	Jonas	21	Guarani	Signed	
GK	(Brazil)	Fábio Costa	28	Corinthians	Signed	
GK	(Brazil)	Roger	33	São Paulo	Signed	
MF	(Chile)	Maldonado	26	Cruzeiro	Signed	
MF	(Brazil)	Fabinho	26	Cerezo Osaka (Japan)	Signed	
DF	(Paraguay)	Julio Manzur	25	Guaraní (Paraguay)	Signed	
FW	(Brazil)	Galvão	23	Iraty	Loaned	
FW	(Brazil)	Reinaldo	26	Kashiwa Reysol (Japan)	Signed	
FW	(Brazil)	Gilmar	21	Vitória	Loaned	
MF	(Brazil)	Cléber Santana	24	Kashiwa Reysol (Japan)	Signed	
DF	(Brazil)	Ronaldo Guiaro	31	Besiktas (Turkey)	Signed	
MF	(Brazil)	Magnum	23	Iraty	Loaned	
MF	(Brazil)	Rodrigo Tabata	25	Goiás	Signed	
FW	(Mexico)	Antonio de Nigris	27	Monterrey (Mexico)	Signed	
FW	(Brazil)	Rodrigo Tiuí	20	Noroeste	Signed	
FW	(Brazil)	Wellington Paulista	23	Juventus	Loaned	
DF	(Brazil)	Dênis	22	Ipatinga	Signed	
MF	(Brazil)	André	21	Iraty	Loaned	
FW	(Brazil)	Leandro	24	Iraty	Loaned	
MF	(Brazil)	André Luiz	32	Ajaccio (France)	Signed	
MF	(Brazil)	Zé Roberto	32	Bayern München (Germany)	Signed	
FW	(Brazil)	Fabiano	21	Guarani	Loan return	

=== Out ===
P	Nat.	Name	Age	Moving to	Type	Source
GK	(Brazil)	Mauro	29	Noroeste	Contract terminated	
FW	(Brazil)	Frontini	24	Marília	Loan expiration	
MF	(Brazil)	Fabinho	29	Internacional	End of contract	
DF	(Brazil)	Flávio	25	Unattached	Contract terminated	
MF	(Brazil)	Ricardo Bóvio	23	Málaga (Spain)	Contract terminated	
GK	(Colombia)	Henao	34	Unattached	Contract terminated	
MF	(Brazil)	Zé Elias	29	Metalurh Donetsk (Ukraine)	Transferred	
FW	(Brazil)	Basílio	33	Tokyo Verdy (Japan)	Contract terminated	
FW	(Brazil)	William	22	Boavista (Portugal)	End of contract	
MF	(Brazil)	Élton	25	Alavés (Spain)	Transferred	
MF	(Brazil)	Ricardinho	29	Corinthians	End of contract	
FW	(Brazil)	Fabiano	21	Guarani	Loaned	
FW	(Brazil)	Cláudio Pitbull	24	Unattached	Contract terminated	
FW	(Brazil)	Luizão	30	Unattached	Contract terminated	
MF	(Brazil)	Giovanni	33	Al-Hilal (Saudi Arabia)	Contract terminated	
DF	(Brazil)	Fabinho	26	Toulouse (France)	Transferred	
FW	(Brazil)	Diego	22	Internacional	Contract terminated	
DF	(Brazil)	Neto	25	Fluminense	Loaned	
MF	(Brazil)	Wendel	24	Bordeaux (France)	Contract terminated	
MF	(Brazil)	Gilmar	22	Unattached	Contract terminated	
MF	(Brazil)	Léo Lima	26	Grêmio	Contract terminated	
MF	(Brazil)	Luciano Henrique	27	Pohang Steelers (South Korea)	Loaned	
MF	(Brazil)	Magnum	24	Unattached	End of contract	
FW	(Mexico)	Antonio de Nigris	24	Unattached	Contract terminated	
FW	(Brazil)	Galvão	23	Atlético Mineiro	Contract terminated	

== Coaching staff ==
Position	Staff
Manager	Vanderlei Luxemburgo
Assistant coach	Serginho Chulapa, Nei Pandolfo
Fitness trainer	Antônio Mello, Claudio Pavanelli
Goalkeeping coach	Marco Antônio (Mocóca)
Doctors	Carlos Braga, Joaquim Grava

Source: Acervo Santista

== Competitions ==
=== Overall summary ===
Competition	Started round	Final position / round	First match	Last match
Campeonato Brasileiro	—	4th	16 April 2006	3 December 2006
Campeonato Paulista	—	Winners	12 January 2006	9 April 2006
Copa do Brasil	First round	Quarter-finals	15 February 2006	3 May 2006
Copa Sudamericana	Second round	Round of 16	12 January 2006	9 April 2006

Updated to match played 3 December 2006
Source: Competitions

=== Detailed overall summary ===
	Total	Home	Away
Games played	68	34	34
Games won	37	29	8
Games drawn	15	3	12
Games lost	16	2	14
Biggest win	5–1 v Palmeiras	5–1 v Palmeiras	4–0 São Paulo
Biggest loss	0–3 v San Lorenzo	0–2 v Vasco da Gama	0–3 v San Lorenzo
Clean sheets	26	20	6
Goals scored	103	61	42
Goals conceded	64	18	46
Goal difference	+39	+43	−4
Average GF per game	1.51	1.79	1.23
Average GC per game	0.94	0.53	1.35
Most appearances	Rodrigo Tabata (63)	Rodrigo Tabata (34)	Kléber (31)
Top scorer	Rodrigo Tabata and Wellington Paulista (10)	Rodrigo Tabata and Wellington Paulista (8)	Reinaldo (5)
Points	126/204 (61.76%)	90/102 (88.23%)	36/102 (35.29%)
Winning rate	54.41%	85.29%	23.53%

=== Campeonato Brasileiro ===
==== League table ====
Pos	Team	Pld	W	D	L	GF	GA	GD	Pts	Qualification or relegation
2	Internacional	38	20	9	9	52	36	+16	69	Qualified for the 2007 Copa Libertadores
3	Grêmio	38	20	7	11	64	45	+19	67	Qualified for the 2007 Copa Libertadores
4	Santos	38	18	10	10	57	36	+21	64	Qualified for the 2007 Copa Libertadores
5	Paraná	38	18	6	14	56	49	+7	60	Qualified for the 2007 Copa Libertadores
6	Vasco	38	15	14	9	57	50	+7	59	Qualified for the 2007 Copa Sudamericana

==== Results summary ====
Overall								Home						Away					
Pld	W	D	L	GF	GA	GD	Pts	W	D	L	GF	GA	GD	W	D	L	GF	GA	GD
38	18	10	10	57	36	+21	64	15	2	2	34	11	+23	3	8	8	23	25	−2

Last updated: 3 December 2006.
Source: Competitive matches

==== Results by round ====
Round	1	2	3	4	5	6	7	8	9	10	11	12	13	14	15	16	17	18	19	20	21	22	23	24	25	26	27	28	29	30	31	32	33	34	35	36	37	38
Ground	A	H	A	H	H	A	A	H	A	H	A	A	H	A	H	A	H	H	A	H	A	H	A	A	H	H	A	H	A	H	H	A	H	A	H	A	A	H
Result	D	W	W	W	W	L	D	W	L	D	L	L	W	W	W	D	W	L	D	W	L	W	D	L	D	W	W	W	L	W	W	L	L	D	W	D	D	W
Position	10	3	1	1	1	2	5	3	5	5	6	6	7	6	3	4	3	4	3	2	3	3	3	4	4	4	3	2	5	3	3	3	3	4	5	4	4	4

Updated to match(es) played on 3 December 2006. Source: Futpédia
A = Away; H = Home; W = Win; D = Draw; L = Loss

==== Matches ====
16 April 1	Goiás	0–0	Santos	Goiânia
		Report		Stadium: Serra Dourada; Referee: Wagner Tardelli

23 April 2	Santos	2–0	Atlético–PR	Mogi Mirim
	De Nigris 11'; Reinaldo 72'	Report		Stadium: João Paulo II; Referee: Clever Assunção Gonçalves

30 April 3	Palmeiras	1–2	Santos	São Paulo
	Gamarra 65'	Report	67' (o.g.) Paulo Baier; 86' Reinaldo	Stadium: Parque Antártica; Referee: Alício Pena Júnior

6 May 4	Santos	2–0	Fortaleza	Santo André
	Rodrigo Tabata 39'; Rodrigo Tiuí 45'	Report		Stadium: Bruno José Daniel; Referee: Luiz Antonio Silva Santos

13 May 5	Santos	3–1	Ponte Preta	Santos
	Preto 2' (o.g.); Da Silva 25' (o.g.); Rodrigo Tiuí 45+2'	Report	49' Iran	Stadium: Vila Belmiro; Referee: Leonardo Gaciba

21 May 6	Fluminense	1–0	Santos	Rio de Janeiro
	Luiz Alberto 69' (o.g.)	Report		Stadium: Maracanã; Referee: Carlos Eugênio Simon

24 May 7	Flamengo	2–2	Santos	Rio de Janeiro
	Renato Silva 31'; Renato 59'	Report	18' Rodrigo Tiuí; 20' Luiz Alberto	Stadium: Maracanã; Referee: Luiz Alberto Bites

28 May 8	Santos	2–0	Corinthians	Santos
	Cléber Santana 20'; Rodrigo Tabata 90+3'	Report		Stadium: Vila Belmiro; Referee: Alício Pena Júnior

31 May 9	Grêmio	1–0	Santos	Porto Alegre
	Hugo 34'	Report		Stadium: Olímpico; Referee: Paulo Henrique de Godoy Bezerra

4 June 10	Santos	0–0	Botafogo	Santos
		Report		Stadium: Vila Belmiro; Referee: Clever Assunção Gonçalves

12 July 11	Figueirense	2–1	Santos	Florianópolis
	Soares 23'; Cícero 64'	Report	58' Rodrigo Tiuí	Stadium: Orlando Scarpelli; Referee: Djalma José Beltrami

16 July 12	São Caetano	2–0	Santos	São Caetano do Sul
	Anderson Lima 74' (pen.), 88' (pen.)	Report		Stadium: Anacleto Campanella; Referee: Wilson de Souza Mendonça

23 July 13	Santos	3–2	Juventude	Santos
	Fabiano 51'; Reinaldo 67' (pen.), 72'	Report	61', 69' Éder Ceccon	Stadium: Vila Belmiro; Referee: Heber Roberto Lopes

30 July 14	São Paulo	0–4	Santos	São Paulo
		Report	41', 43' Fabiano; 54' Dênis; 72' Rodrigo Tiuí	Stadium: Morumbi; Referee: Leonardo Gaciba

6 August 15	Santos	2–1	Internacional	Santos
	Wendel 84', 90+1' (pen.)	Report	10' Iarley	Stadium: Vila Belmiro; Referee: Wagner Tardelli

13 August 16	Paraná Clube	1–1	Santos	Curitiba
	Maicosuel 13'	Report	5' Wellington Paulista	Stadium: Pinheirão; Referee: Antônio Hora Filho

17 August 17	Santos	2–0	Cruzeiro	Santos
	Wellington Paulista 18'; Rodrigo Tabata 81'	Report		Stadium: Vila Belmiro; Referee: Carlos Eugênio Simon

20 August 18	Santos	0–2	Vasco	Santos
		Report	62' Abedi; 78' (pen.) Morais	Stadium: Vila Belmiro; Referee: Giuliano Bozzano

23 August 19	Santa Cruz	1–1	Santos	Recife
	Júnior Maranhão 53'	Report	44' André	Stadium: Arruda; Referee: Wallace Nascimento Valente

26 August 20	Santos	2–1	Goiás	Santos
	Kléber 55'; Carlinhos 62'	Report	37' Souza	Stadium: Vila Belmiro; Referee: Sérgio da Silva Carvalho

30 August 21	Atlético–PR	2–1	Santos	Curitiba
	Marcos Aurélio 50'; Willian 85'	Report	90+2' Rodrigo Tiuí	Stadium: Arena da Baixada; Referee: Djalma José Beltrami

3 September 22	Santos	5–1	Palmeiras	Santos
	Luiz Alberto 13', 24'; Wellington Paulista 60', 67'; Jonas 70'	Report	23' Juninho Paulista	Stadium: Vila Belmiro; Referee: Leonardo Gaciba

10 September 23	Fortaleza	1–1	Santos	Fortaleza
	Rinaldo 58'	Report	38' Dênis	Stadium: Presidente Vargas; Referee: Lourival Dias Lima Filho

17 September 24	Ponte Preta	1–0	Santos	Campinas
	Tuto 72' (pen.)	Report		Stadium: Moisés Lucarelli; Referee: Alício Pena Júnior

20 September 25	Santos	1–1	Fluminense	Santos
	Cléber Santana 78' (pen.)	Report	85' (o.g.) Luiz Alberto	Stadium: Vila Belmiro; Referee: Leonardo Gaciba

24 September 26	Santos	3–0	Flamengo	Santos
	Wellington Paulista 59'; Zé Roberto 72'; Rodrigo Tabata 90+1'	Report		Stadium: Vila Belmiro; Referee: Wilson de Souza Mendonça

5 October 27	Corinthians	0–3	Santos	São Paulo
		Report	40' Kléber; 78' Leandro; 80' Zé Roberto	Stadium: Pacaembu; Referee: Wilson Luiz Seneme

8 October 28	Santos	1–0	Grêmio	Santos
	Domingos 35'	Report		Stadium: Vila Belmiro; Referee: Clever Assunção Gonçalves

14 October 29	Botafogo	4–3	Santos	Rio de Janeiro
	Asprilla 19'; Reinaldo 43'; Zé Roberto 83'; Juca 85'	Report	33' Kléber; 51' Wellington Paulista; 78' Reinaldo	Stadium: Estádio Nilton Santos; Referee: Carlos Eugênio Simon

21 October 30	Santos	2–1	Figueirense	Santos
	Rodrigo Tabata 22'; Wellington Paulista 48'	Report	67' Soares	Stadium: Vila Belmiro; Referee: Wagner Tardelli

28 October 31	Santos	1–0	São Caetano	Santos
	Rodrigo Tabata 65'	Report		Stadium: Vila Belmiro; Referee: Wagner Tardelli

1 November 32	Juventude	3–2	Santos	Caxias do Sul
	Christian 16'; Alexandre 57'; Raullen 70'	Report	40' Rodrigo Tabata; 54' (o.g.) Igor	Stadium: Alfredo Jaconi; Referee: Alício Pena Júnior

5 November 33	Santos	0–1	São Paulo	Santos
		Report	29' Mineiro	Stadium: Vila Belmiro; Referee: Paulo César de Oliveira

8 November 34	Internacional	0–0	Santos	Porto Alegre
		Report		Stadium: Beira Rio; Referee: Clever Assunção Gonçalves

11 November 35	Santos	1–0	Paraná Clube	Santos
	Rodrigo Tabata 43'	Report		Stadium: Vila Belmiro; Referee: Carlos Eugênio Simon

19 November 36	Cruzeiro	1–1	Santos	Belo Horizonte
	Gladstone 87'	Report	69' Kléber	Stadium: Mineirão; Referee: Sérgio da Silva Carvalho

26 November 37	Vasco	1–1	Santos	Rio de Janeiro
	Leandro Amaral 38'	Report	21' Domingos	Stadium: São Januário; Referee: Leonardo Gaciba

3 December 38	Santos	3–1	Santa Cruz	Santos
	Wellington Paulista 20', 79'; Júnior 27'	Report	12' Osmar	Stadium: Vila Belmiro; Referee: Antônio Hora Filho

=== Campeonato Paulista ===
==== League table ====
Pos	Team	Pld	W	D	L	GF	GA	GD	Pts
1	Santos (C)	19	14	1	4	33	19	+14	43
2	São Paulo	19	13	3	3	46	21	+25	42
3	Palmeiras	19	11	3	5	37	28	+9	36
4	Noroeste	19	10	4	5	34	26	+8	34
5	São Caetano	19	9	5	5	26	23	+3	32

(C) Champions

==== Results summary ====
Overall								Home						Away					
Pld	W	D	L	GF	GA	GD	Pts	W	D	L	GF	GA	GD	W	D	L	GF	GA	GD
19	14	1	4	33	19	+14	43	10	0	0	19	3	+16	4	1	4	14	16	−2

Last updated: 9 April 2006.
Source: Competitive matches

==== Matches ====
12 January 1	São Bento	1–1	Santos	Sorocaba
	Genílson 73'	Report	71' Luciano Henrique	Stadium: Walter Ribeiro; Referee: Philippe Lombard

15 January 2	Santos	2–0	Mogi Mirim	Santos
	Wendel 15'; Luiz Alberto 52'	Report		Stadium: Vila Belmiro; Referee: Marco Antônio de Oliveira de Sá

19 January 3	Paulista	3–1	Santos	Sorocaba
	Wilson 30'; Luiz Fernando 60'; Abraão 90+4' (pen.)	Report	42' Fabinho	Stadium: Walter Ribeiro; Referee: Carlos Roberto dos Santos

22 January 4	Santos	3–2	Marília	Santos
	Rodrigo Tabata 6'; Jonas 44'; Manzur 71'	Report	35', 56' Sandro Gaúcho	Stadium: Vila Belmiro; Referee: Rodrigo Martins Cintra

29 January 5	América–SP	2–3	Santos	São José do Rio Preto
	Dú 26'; Danilinho 42'	Report	25' Luiz Alberto; 34', 90+2' Jonas	Stadium: Teixeirão; Referee: Otávio Corrêa da Silva

2 February 6	Santos	3–0	Santo André	Santos
	Léo Lima 70'; Jonas 80'; Magnum 86'	Report		Stadium: Vila Belmiro; Referee: Kléber José de Melo

5 February 7	Portuguesa Santista	2–1	Santos	São Caetano do Sul
	Léo Mineiro 14'; Júlio César 61'	Report	69' Luiz Alberto	Stadium: Anacleto Campanella; Referee: Anselmo da Costa

8 February 8	Santos	1–0	Noroeste	Santos
	Reinaldo 54'	Report		Stadium: Vila Belmiro; Referee: Rodrigo Guarizo Ferreira do Amaral

12 February 9	Corinthians	0–1	Santos	São Paulo
		Report	78' Geílson	Stadium: Morumbi; Referee: José Henrique de Carvalho

19 February 10	Santos	1–0	Ponte Preta	Santos
	Cléber Santana 59'	Report		Stadium: Vila Belmiro; Referee: Salvio Spinola Fagundes Filho

25 February 11	Santos	1–0	Rio Branco–SP	Santos
	Geílson 17'	Report		Stadium: Vila Belmiro; Referee: Cleber Wellington Abade

1 March 12	São Caetano	2–3	Santos	São Caetano do Sul
	Marabá 36'; Marcelinho 80'	Report	22' Rodrigo Tabata; 31' Fabinho; 68' Léo Lima	Stadium: Anacleto Campanella; Referee: Élcio Paschoal Borborema

5 March 13	Santos	1–0	Palmeiras	Santos
	Léo Lima 85' (pen.)	Report		Stadium: Vila Belmiro; Referee: Luis Marcelo Vicentin Cansian

12 March 14	Guarani	2–1	Santos	Campinas
	Edmílson 32' (pen.); Goeber 35'	Report	72' Reinaldo	Stadium: Brinco de Ouro; Referee: Rodrigo Guarizo Ferreira do Amaral

19 March 15	Santos	2–0	Ituano	Santos
	Luiz Alberto 4'; Léo Lima 22'	Report		Stadium: Vila Belmiro; Referee: Alex Sander da Rosa Lefeu

25 March 16	Juventus	1–2	Santos	São Paulo
	Manu 13'	Report	17' Cléber Santana; 80' Reinaldo	Stadium: Pacaembu; Referee: Rodrigo Braghetto

30 March 17	Santos	3–1	Bragantino	Santos
	Manzur 35'; Magnum 45+1', 75'	Report	26' Davi	Stadium: Vila Belmiro; Referee: Antonio Rogério Batista do Prado

2 April 18	São Paulo	3–1	Santos	São Paulo
	Rogério Ceni 45' (pen.); Thiago Ribeiro 72'; Alex Dias 90+2'	Report	25' (pen.) Léo Lima	Stadium: Morumbi; Referee: Rodrigo Martins Cintra

9 April 19	Santos	2–0	Portuguesa	Santos
	Cléber Santana 23'; Leonardo 28' (o.g.)	Report		Stadium: Vila Belmiro; Referee: Wilson Luiz Seneme

=== Copa do Brasil ===
==== First round ====
15 February 1st Leg	Sergipe	0–0	Santos	Aracaju
		Report		Stadium: Batistão; Referee: Jailson Macedo Freitas

22 February 2nd Leg	Santos	3–0 (3–0 agg.)	Sergipe	Santos
	Cléber Santana 10'; Magnum 46'; Léo Lima 60' (pen.)	Report		Stadium: Vila Belmiro; Referee: Luiz Carlos da Silva

==== Second round ====
22 March	URT	1–3	Santos	Patos de Minas
	Ditinho 48'	Report	21', 76' Reinaldo; 75' Léo Lima	Stadium: Zama Maciel; Referee: Sérgio da Silva Carvalho

==== Round of 16 ====
12 April 1st Leg	Santos	2–1	Brasiliense	Santos
	Wendel 10'; Cléber Santana 39' (pen.)	Report	8' Carlos Alberto	Stadium: Vila Belmiro

19 April 2nd Leg	Brasiliense	1–1 (2–3 agg.)	Santos	Taguatinga
	Joãozinho 23'	Report	79' Reinaldo	Stadium: Boca do Jacaré

==== Quarter-finals ====
26 April 1st Leg	Santos	1–1	Ipatinga	Santos
	Cléber Santana 84'	Report	37' André	Stadium: Vila Belmiro; Referee: Wilson de Souza Mendonça

3 May 2nd Leg	Ipatinga	1–1 (2–2 agg.) (5–3 p)	Santos	Ipatinga
	Henrique 42'	Report	23' Kléber	Stadium: Ipatingão; Referee: Heber Roberto Lopes
	Penalties
	Márcio Guerreiro (penalty scored); André (penalty scored); Henrique (penalty scored); Jaílton (penalty scored); Marinho Donizete (penalty scored)		(penalty scored) Léo Lima; (penalty scored) Cléber Santana; (penalty missed) Kléber; (penalty scored) Wellington Paulista

=== Copa Sudamericana ===
==== Second round ====
6 September 1st Leg	Santos (Brazil)	1–0	(Brazil) Cruzeiro	São Paulo, Brazil
	André 82'	Report		Stadium: Pacaembu; Referee: (Brazil) Leonardo Gaciba

13 September 2nd Leg	Cruzeiro (Brazil)	1–0 (1–1 agg.) (3–4 p)	(Brazil) Santos	Belo Horizonte, Brazil
	Wágner 50'	Report		Stadium: Mineirão; Referee: (Brazil) Wilson de Souza Mendonça
	Penalties
	Gabriel (penalty missed); Élson (penalty missed); Sandro (penalty scored); Gladstone (penalty scored); Thiago Heleno (penalty scored)		(penalty scored) Cléber Santana; (penalty scored) Kléber; (penalty scored) Jonas; (penalty missed) Carlinhos; (penalty scored) Wellington Paulista

==== Round of 16 ====
27 September 1st Leg	San Lorenzo (Argentina)	3–0	(Brazil) Santos	Buenos Aires, Argentina
	González 7'; Jiménez 60'; Lavezzi 67'	Report		Stadium: Pedro Bidegain; Referee: (Chile) Carlos Chandía

11 October 2nd Leg	Santos (Brazil)	1–0 (1–3 agg.)	(Argentina) San Lorenzo	São Paulo, Brazil
	Wellington Paulista 37'	Report		Stadium: Vila Belmiro; Attendance: 6,284; Referee: (Uruguay) Jorge Larrionda
