= Luiz Alberto =

Luiz Alberto may refer to:

- Luiz Alberto (footballer, born 1977), Luiz Alberto da Silva Oliveira, Brazilian football centre-back
- Luiz Alberto (footballer, born 1982), Luiz Alberto Leite Sousa, Brazilian football centre-back
- Luiz Alberto Pirola (born 1954), Brazilian football forward

== See also ==
- Luis Alberto (disambiguation)
