= 2005 J.League Division 1 =

13th season of J1 League

J.League Division 1
- Season: 2005
- Champions: Gamba Osaka; 1st J.League title 1st Japanese title
- Relegated: Kashiwa Reysol; Tokyo Verdy 1969; Vissel Kobe
- Champions League: Gamba Osaka; Tokyo Verdy 1969 (all to the group stage)
- Matches: 306
- Goals: 873 (2.85 per match)
- Top goalscorer: Clemerson (33 goals)
- Highest attendance: 55,476 (Round 9, Reds vs. Grampus)
- Lowest attendance: 3,267 (Round 5, Verdy vs. Sanfrecce)
- Average attendance: 18,765

The 2005 J.League Division 1 season was the 13th season since the establishment of J.League Division 1. It began on March 5 and ended on December 3, followed by J. League promotion/relegation series matches on December 7 and 10.

== General ==
=== Promotion and relegation ===
- At the end of the 2004 season, Kawasaki Frontale and Omiya Ardija were promoted to J1.
- At the end of the 2004 season, there were no relegation to J2.
- At the end of the 2004 season, Tokushima Vortis and Thespakusatsu Gunma were promoted to J2 from JFL.

=== Changes in competition formats ===
- The Division 1 was expanded to 18 clubs, and Division 2 stays at 12 clubs.
- The format of Division 1 was changed from the double-season format to a single season.
- In games that require extra time in case of a tie (i.e. league cup finals), golden goal rules were eliminated. Clubs now had to play the full extra time.

=== Changes in clubs ===
- JEF United relocates from Ichihara to the prefecture capital, Chiba, and becomes JEF United Ichihara Chiba.

== Honours ==
Competition	Champion	Runner-up	3rd place
J.League Division 1	Gamba Osaka	Urawa Red Diamonds	Kashima Antlers
J.League Division 2	Kyoto Purple Sanga	Avispa Fukuoka	Ventforet Kofu
Emperor's Cup	Urawa Red Diamonds	Shimizu S-Pulse	Cerezo Osaka; Omiya Ardija
Nabisco Cup	JEF United Ichihara Chiba	Gamba Osaka	Urawa Red Diamonds; Yokohama F. Marinos
XEROX Super Cup	Tokyo Verdy 1969	Yokohama F. Marinos	

== Clubs ==
Location of the clubs in Japan

Following eighteen clubs played in J.League Division 1 during 2005 season. Of these clubs, Omiya Ardija and Kawasaki Frontale were newly promoted clubs.

- Albirex Niigata
- Cerezo Osaka
- FC Tokyo
- Gamba Osaka
- JEF United Ichihara Chiba
- Júbilo Iwata
- Kashima Antlers
- Kashiwa Reysol
- Kawasaki Frontale
- Nagoya Grampus Eight
- Oita Trinita
- Omiya Ardija
- Sanfrecce Hiroshima
- Shimizu S-Pulse
- Tokyo Verdy 1969
- Urawa Red Diamonds
- Vissel Kobe
- Yokohama F. Marinos

=== Personnel ===
Club	Head coach
Albirex Niigata	(Japan) Yasuharu Sorimachi
Cerezo Osaka	(Japan) Shinji Kobayashi
FC Tokyo	(Japan) Hiromi Hara
Gamba Osaka	(Japan) Akira Nishino
JEF United Ichihara Chiba	(Bosnia and Herzegovina) Ivica Osim
Júbilo Iwata	(Japan) Masakuni Yamamoto
Kashima Antlers	(Brazil) Toninho Cerezo
Kashiwa Reysol	(Japan) Hiroshi Hayano
Kawasaki Frontale	(Japan) Takashi Sekizuka
Nagoya Grampus Eight	(Japan) Hitoshi Nakata
Oita Trinita	(Brazil) Péricles Chamusca
Omiya Ardija	(Japan) Toshiya Miura
Sanfrecce Hiroshima	(Japan) Takeshi Ono
Shimizu S-Pulse	(Japan) Kenta Hasegawa
Tokyo Verdy 1969	(Brazil) Vadão
Urawa Red Diamonds	(Germany) Guido Buchwald
Vissel Kobe	(Czech Republic) Pavel Řehák
Yokohama F. Marinos	(Japan) Takeshi Okada

=== Foreign players ===
Club	Player 1	Player 2	Player 3	Non-visa foreign	Type-C contract	Former players
Albirex Niigata	(Brazil) Ânderson Lima	(Brazil) Edmílson	(Brazil) Fabinho Santos		(Brazil) Neto Potiguar	(Brazil) Marcel Sacramento
Cerezo Osaka	(Brazil) Bruno Quadros	(Brazil) Fabinho	(Brazil) Zé Carlos			
FC Tokyo	(Brazil) Jean	(Brazil) Lucas Severino	(Paraguay) Santiago Salcedo		(Brazil) Rychely	(Brazil) Danilo Gomes
Gamba Osaka	(Brazil) Clemerson	(Brazil) Fernandinho	(Brazil) Sidiclei			
JEF United Ichihara Chiba	(Austria) Mario Haas	(Bulgaria) Ilian Stoyanov	(Romania) Gabriel Popescu	(South Korea) Kim Dong-soo		
Júbilo Iwata	(South Korea) Choi Yong-soo	(South Korea) Kim Jin-kyu			(Senegal) Ibrahima Rene Camara	(Brazil) Rodrigo Gral
Kashima Antlers	(Brazil) Alex Mineiro	(Brazil) Fernando	(Brazil) Ricardinho			(Brazil) Ari
Kashiwa Reysol	(Brazil) Cléber Santana	(Brazil) França	(Brazil) Reinaldo			(Brazil) Ricardinho (South Korea) Choi Sung-kuk
Kawasaki Frontale	(Brazil) Augusto César	(Brazil) Juninho	(Brazil) Marcus Vinícius	(South Korea) Chong Yong-de	(Brazil) Hulk	
Nagoya Grampus Eight	(Brazil) Claiton			(North Korea) An Yong-hak	(Argentina) Jorge Sebastián Núñez (Brazil) Eduardo	(Brazil) Luizão (Brazil) Marques (Brazil) Ueslei
Oita Trinita	(Brazil) Edmilson Alves	(Brazil) Magno Alves	(Brazil) Túlio			(Brazil) Dodô (Netherlands) Patrick Zwaanswijk
Omiya Ardija	(Brazil) Leandro	(Brazil) Toninho	(Brazil) Tuto			(Brazil) Christian
Sanfrecce Hiroshima	(Brazil) Beto	(Brazil) Dininho	(Brazil) Galvão	(North Korea) Ri Han-jae	(Brazil) Jorginho	
Shimizu S-Pulse	(Brazil) Marquinhos	(South Korea) Cho Jae-jin	(South Korea) Choi Tae-uk			(Brazil) Rogério Corrêa
Tokyo Verdy 1969	(Brazil) Gil	(Brazil) Washington			(South Korea) Lee Woo-jin (South Korea) Moon Je-chun	
Urawa Red Diamonds	(Brazil) Nenê	(Brazil) Robson Ponte	(Croatia) Tomislav Marić	(Brazil) Eliézio (Spain) Sergio Escudero		(Brazil) Emerson Sheik (Turkey) Alpay Özalan
Vissel Kobe	(Czech Republic) Ivo Ulich	(Czech Republic) Martin Müller	(Czech Republic) Pavel Horváth	(South Korea) Park Kang-jo		(Brazil) Diego Souza (Brazil) Roger Machado (Cameroon) Patrick Mboma
Yokohama F. Marinos	(Brazil) Dutra	(Brazil) Magrão	(Brazil) Rodrigo Gral			(Brazil) Adhemar (South Korea) Ahn Jung-hwan

== Format ==
Eighteen clubs will play in double round-robin (home and away) format, a total of 34 games each. A club receives 3 points for a win, 1 point for a tie, and 0 points for a loss. The clubs are ranked by points, and tie breakers are, in the following order:

- Goal differential
- Goals scored
- Head-to-head results

A draw would be conducted, if necessary. However, if two clubs are tied at the first place, both clubs will be declared as the champions. The bottom two clubs will be relegated to J2, while the 16th placed club plays a two-legged Promotion/relegation Series.

Changes from previous year

- Number of clubs competing increased from 16 to 18
- The season format was changed from the double-season format to a single season.
- Number of games per club increased from 30 games to 34 games per season.

== Table ==
Pos	Team	Pld	W	D	L	GF	GA	GD	Pts	Qualification or relegation
1	Gamba Osaka (C)	34	18	6	10	82	58	+24	60	Qualification for 2006 AFC Champions League Group stage (Note: Tokyo Verdy 1969 qualified to 2006 AFC Champions League as 2004 Emperor's Cup winners.)
2	Urawa Red Diamonds	34	17	8	9	65	37	+28	59	
3	Kashima Antlers	34	16	11	7	61	39	+22	59	
4	JEF United Ichihara Chiba	34	16	11	7	56	42	+14	59	
5	Cerezo Osaka	34	16	11	7	48	40	+8	59	
6	Júbilo Iwata	34	14	9	11	51	41	+10	51	
7	Sanfrecce Hiroshima	34	13	11	10	50	42	+8	50	
8	Kawasaki Frontale	34	15	5	14	54	47	+7	50	
9	Yokohama F. Marinos	34	12	12	10	41	40	+1	48	
10	FC Tokyo	34	11	14	9	43	40	+3	47	
11	Oita Trinita	34	12	7	15	44	43	+1	43	
12	Albirex Niigata	34	11	9	14	47	62	−15	42	
13	Omiya Ardija	34	12	5	17	39	50	−11	41	
14	Nagoya Grampus Eight	34	10	9	15	43	49	−6	39	
15	Shimizu S-Pulse	34	9	12	13	40	49	−9	39	
16	Kashiwa Reysol (R)	34	8	11	15	39	54	−15	35	Relegation to 2006 J.League Division 2
17	Tokyo Verdy 1969 (R)	34	6	12	16	40	73	−33	30	Relegation to 2006 J.League Division 2
18	Vissel Kobe (R)	34	4	9	21	30	67	−37	21	Relegation to 2006 J.League Division 2

Updated to match(es) played on December 3, 2005. Source: J. League Division 1
Rules for classification: 1) points; 2) goal difference; 3) number of goals scored.
(C) Champions; (R) Relegated

== Results ==
Home \ Away	ALB	ANT	ARD	CER	FRO	GAM	GRA	JEF	JÚB	REY	SFR	SSP	TOK	TRI	RED	VER	VIS	FMA
Albirex Niigata		2–2	3–2	1–2	2–1	4–2	3–0	1–1	0–1	2–2	0–1	0–0	0–1	2–1	0–4	1–1	3–2	1–0
Kashima Antlers	7–2		2–0	0–1	2–0	2–2	1–0	2–2	2–1	4–0	1–2	2–1	1–1	1–1	2–2	2–1	4–0	0–2
Omiya Ardija	1–4	0–2		1–0	1–0	1–0	3–2	0–1	0–2	1–0	0–1	3–2	0–1	3–1	1–3	2–3	1–1	1–1
Cerezo Osaka	1–0	0–0	1–0		2–0	2–4	1–0	2–0	2–0	1–1	1–1	1–1	2–2	1–1	3–1	0–0	2–1	2–3
Kawasaki Frontale	3–0	2–1	2–1	3–2		2–4	0–2	1–0	0–2	3–1	1–1	0–1	0–0	2–1	3–3	1–0	3–1	2–1
Gamba Osaka	1–1	3–3	0–2	4–1	3–2		3–1	1–2	3–1	3–2	4–2	3–3	5–3	1–2	2–1	7–1	3–1	3–2
Nagoya Grampus Eight	0–1	3–0	1–1	1–3	1–4	2–1		2–2	2–0	4–0	1–1	1–2	1–0	0–0	0–2	5–4	0–2	1–1
JEF United Ichihara Chiba	3–2	2–4	2–0	1–2	1–0	3–1	2–1		2–2	2–2	1–1	2–1	2–1	4–2	1–0	1–0	4–0	2–2
Júbilo Iwata	2–3	1–1	2–0	3–0	1–2	2–1	0–3	1–3		1–0	1–3	1–1	1–1	2–1	2–2	6–0	1–0	3–1
Kashiwa Reysol	0–0	1–3	1–2	1–1	1–1	2–1	0–2	1–2	0–4		1–1	1–2	4–2	0–0	3–0	5–1	1–0	0–1
Sanfrecce Hiroshima	5–0	0–1	2–1	1–2	2–1	1–2	1–2	1–1	0–0	0–0		3–1	0–0	0–4	3–4	3–0	2–0	0–1
Shimizu S-Pulse	2–1	2–2	2–1	1–1	3–2	1–4	2–2	2–1	1–1	1–2	1–1		0–1	0–1	0–1	1–2	1–0	0–1
FC Tokyo	4–0	0–2	3–3	2–2	1–1	2–1	1–1	2–1	1–0	0–2	2–2	1–0		0–0	0–2	0–0	1–1	4–0
Oita Trinita	1–3	1–1	2–1	1–2	1–0	0–2	2–0	0–1	1–2	1–1	0–1	5–0	2–1		1–0	1–2	2–1	0–2
Urawa Red Diamonds	2–1	0–1	1–2	1–2	3–2	1–1	3–0	0–0	1–0	7–0	2–0	1–1	2–1	1–2		4–1	2–2	0–0
Tokyo Verdy 1969	2–2	2–0	1–1	0–1	1–2	0–1	0–0	2–2	4–4	1–0	1–4	0–0	1–2	4–2	0–7		3–3	1–1
Vissel Kobe	1–1	0–2	0–1	3–1	1–6	1–4	1–0	1–1	0–0	0–4	2–3	0–3	1–2	2–1	0–1	1–1		0–2
Yokohama F. Marinos	4–1	2–1	1–2	1–1	0–2	2–2	2–2	2–1	0–1	0–0	3–1	1–1	0–0	0–3	0–1	1–0	1–1	

Updated to match(es) played on December 3, 2005. Source: J. League Division 1
Legend: Blue = home team win; Yellow = draw; Red = away team win.

== Top scorers ==
Rank	Scorer	Club	Goals
1	(Brazil) Clemerson	Gamba Osaka	33
2	(Brazil) Washington	Tokyo Verdy 1969	22
3	(Brazil) Edmílson	Albirex Niigata	18
3	(Brazil) Magno Alves	Oita Trinita	18
3	(Japan) Hisato Satō	Sanfrecce Hiroshima	18
6	(Brazil) Juninho	Kawasaki Frontale	16
6	(Japan) Masashi Oguro	Gamba Osaka	16
8	(Brazil) Alex Mineiro	Kashima Antlers	15
9	(Japan) Robert Cullen	Júbilo Iwata	13
10	(Japan) Ryoichi Maeda	Júbilo Iwata	12
10	(Japan) Seiichiro Maki	JEF United Ichihara Chiba	12
10	(Japan) Yuki Abe	JEF United Ichihara Chiba	12

== Attendance figures ==
Pos	Team	Total	High	Low	Average	Change
1	Albirex Niigata	681,945	41,988	35,337	40,114	+6.4%
2	Urawa Red Diamonds	669,066	55,476	15,760	39,357	+7.4%
3	FC Tokyo	460,721	43,104	18,089	27,101	+6.5%
4	Yokohama F. Marinos	437,121	53,097	14,450	25,713	+3.6%
5	Oita Trinita	375,359	30,048	12,683	22,080	+0.9%
6	Kashima Antlers	316,897	35,467	7,076	18,641	+6.0%
7	Cerezo Osaka	300,020	43,927	5,232	17,648	+23.2%
8	Júbilo Iwata	294,040	37,384	9,854	17,296	+1.0%
9	Gamba Osaka	271,416	22,884	6,646	15,966	+27.6%
10	Vissel Kobe	253,524	25,104	7,643	14,913	−5.2%
11	Tokyo Verdy 1969	250,177	35,257	3,267	14,716	−2.3%
12	Kawasaki Frontale	232,183	24,332	7,023	13,658	+49.3%^{†}
13	Nagoya Grampus Eight	225,896	22,110	6,348	13,288	−15.4%
14	Shimizu S-Pulse	216,784	21,730	7,280	12,752	−6.0%
15	Sanfrecce Hiroshima	212,960	26,083	6,230	12,527	−15.4%
16	Kashiwa Reysol	212,368	27,328	6,457	12,492	+18.8%
17	Omiya Ardija	169,667	30,038	4,556	9,980	+63.4%^{†}
18	JEF United Ichihara Chiba	162,089	17,087	4,249	9,535	−4.8%^{‡}
	League total	5,742,233	55,476	3,267	18,765	−1.1%

Updated to games played on December 3, 2005
Source: J. League Division 1
Notes:
^{†} Team played previous season in J2.
^{‡} Relocated from Ichihara to Chiba.

== Awards ==
=== Individual ===
Award	Recipient	Club
Player of the Year	(Brazil) Clemerson	Gamba Osaka
Young Player of the Year	(Japan) Robert Cullen	Júbilo Iwata
Manager of the Year	(Japan) Akira Nishino	Gamba Osaka
Top Scorer	(Brazil) Clemerson	Gamba Osaka
Fair Play Player Award	(Japan) Masashi Oguro	Gamba Osaka
Fair Play Player Award	(Japan) Teruyuki Moniwa	FC Tokyo
Referee of the Year	(Japan) Kazuhiko Matsumura	
Assistant Referee of the Year	(Japan) Masatoshi Shibata	
Meritoriousness Player Award	(Brazil) Bismarck	

=== Best Eleven ===
Position	Footballer	Club	Nationality
GK	Motohiro Yoshida (1)	Cerezo Osaka	Japan
DF	Ilian Stoyanov (1)	JEF United Ichihara Chiba	Bulgaria
DF	Marcus Tulio Tanaka (2)	Urawa Red Diamonds	Japan
DF	Yuji Nakazawa (4)	Yokohama F. Marinos	Japan
MF	Fernandinho (1)	Gamba Osaka	Brazil
MF	Mitsuo Ogasawara (5)	Kashima Antlers	Japan
MF	Tatsuya Furuhashi (1)	Cerezo Osaka	Japan
MF	Yasuhito Endō (3)	Gamba Osaka	Japan
MF	Yuki Abe (1)	JEF United Ichihara Chiba	Japan
FW	Clemerson (1)	Gamba Osaka	Brazil
FW	Hisato Satō (1)	Sanfrecce Hiroshima	Japan

* The number in brackets denotes the number of times that the footballer has appeared in the Best 11.
