= 1999 Verdy Kawasaki season =

Verdy Kawasaki
1999 season
- Manager: Hideki Matsunaga
- Stadium: Todoroki Athletics Stadium
- J.League 1: 7th
- Emperor's Cup: Semifinals
- J.League Cup: 2nd Round
- Top goalscorer: Kentaro Hayashi (7)
Home colours	Away colours

1999 Verdy Kawasaki season

== Competitions ==
Competitions	Position
J.League 1	7th / 16 clubs
Emperor's Cup	Semifinals
J.League Cup	2nd Round

== Domestic results ==
=== J.League 1 ===
6 March 1999 1-1	Shimizu S-Pulse	3-1	Verdy Kawasaki	Nihondaira Sports Stadium
JST (UTC+09)

13 March 1999 1-2	Verdy Kawasaki	2-0	Cerezo Osaka	Todoroki Athletics Stadium
JST (UTC+09)

20 March 1999 1-3	Júbilo Iwata	3-0	Verdy Kawasaki	Júbilo Iwata Stadium
JST (UTC+09)

27 March 1999 1-4	Verdy Kawasaki	2-1	Kashima Antlers	Tokyo National Stadium
JST (UTC+09)

3 April 1999 1-5	Urawa Red Diamonds	2-2 (GG) (a.e.t.)	Verdy Kawasaki	Urawa Komaba Stadium
JST (UTC+09)

10 April 1999 1-6	Verdy Kawasaki	2-1	Nagoya Grampus Eight	Todoroki Athletics Stadium
JST (UTC+09)

17 April 1999 1-7	Gamba Osaka	0-1	Verdy Kawasaki	Osaka Expo '70 Stadium
JST (UTC+09)

24 April 1999 1-8	Verdy Kawasaki	1-0	JEF United Ichihara	Todoroki Athletics Stadium
JST (UTC+09)

28 April 1999 1-9	Vissel Kobe	1-2 (GG) (a.e.t.)	Verdy Kawasaki	Kobe Universiade Memorial Stadium
JST (UTC+09)

1 May 1999 1-10	Verdy Kawasaki	2-0	Sanfrecce Hiroshima	Todoroki Athletics Stadium
JST (UTC+09)

5 May 1999 1-11	Avispa Fukuoka	1-2	Verdy Kawasaki	Hakatanomori Football Stadium
JST (UTC+09)

8 May 1999 1-12	Bellmare Hiratsuka	0-1	Verdy Kawasaki	Hiratsuka Athletics Stadium
JST (UTC+09)

15 May 1999 1-13	Verdy Kawasaki	0-3	Kyoto Purple Sanga	Todoroki Athletics Stadium
JST (UTC+09)

22 May 1999 1-14	Kashiwa Reysol	0-1	Verdy Kawasaki	Kashiwanoha Park Stadium
JST (UTC+09)

29 May 1999 1-15	Verdy Kawasaki	1-0 (GG) (a.e.t.)	Yokohama F. Marinos	Tokyo National Stadium
JST (UTC+09)

7 August 1999 2-1	Verdy Kawasaki	1-0	Gamba Osaka	Todoroki Athletics Stadium
JST (UTC+09)

14 August 1999 2-2	JEF United Ichihara	3-4 (GG) (a.e.t.)	Verdy Kawasaki	Ichihara Seaside Stadium
JST (UTC+09)

18 August 1999 2-3	Verdy Kawasaki	2-3	Vissel Kobe	Todoroki Athletics Stadium
JST (UTC+09)

21 August 1999 2-4	Sanfrecce Hiroshima	2-3	Verdy Kawasaki	Hiroshima Big Arch
JST (UTC+09)

28 August 1999 2-5	Verdy Kawasaki	2-0	Avispa Fukuoka	Todoroki Athletics Stadium
JST (UTC+09)

4 September 1999 2-6	Verdy Kawasaki	2-1 (GG) (a.e.t.)	Bellmare Hiratsuka	Todoroki Athletics Stadium
JST (UTC+09)

11 September 1999 2-7	Kyoto Purple Sanga	1-0 (GG) (a.e.t.)	Verdy Kawasaki	Kagoshima Kamoike Stadium
JST (UTC+09)

15 September 1999 2-8	Verdy Kawasaki	1-3	Kashiwa Reysol	Todoroki Athletics Stadium
JST (UTC+09)

18 September 1999 2-9	Yokohama F. Marinos	3-2 (GG) (a.e.t.)	Verdy Kawasaki	International Stadium Yokohama
JST (UTC+09)

23 September 1999 2-10	Verdy Kawasaki	0-2	Shimizu S-Pulse	Todoroki Athletics Stadium
JST (UTC+09)

30 October 1999 2-11	Verdy Kawasaki	1-0	Júbilo Iwata	Tokyo National Stadium
JST (UTC+09)

17 November 1999 2-12	Cerezo Osaka	2-1	Verdy Kawasaki	Osaka Nagai Stadium
JST (UTC+09)

20 November 1999 2-13	Nagoya Grampus Eight	4-1	Verdy Kawasaki	Mizuho Athletic Stadium
JST (UTC+09)

23 November 1999 2-14	Verdy Kawasaki	2-2 (GG) (a.e.t.)	Urawa Red Diamonds	Todoroki Athletics Stadium
JST (UTC+09)

27 November 1999 2-15	Kashima Antlers	2-1	Verdy Kawasaki	Kashima Soccer Stadium
JST (UTC+09)

=== Emperor's Cup ===
1st Round	bye

2nd Round	bye

12 December 1999 3rd Round	Verdy Kawasaki	3-2 (GG) (a.e.t.)	Yokohama F.C.	Todoroki Athletics Stadium
JST (UTC+09)

19 December 1999 4th Round	Kawasaki Frontale	1-3	Verdy Kawasaki	Kagawa Marugame Stadium
JST (UTC+09)

23 December 1999 Quarterfinals	Yokohama F. Marinos	0-1	Verdy Kawasaki	International Stadium Yokohama
JST (UTC+09)

26 December 1999 Semifinals	Sanfrecce Hiroshima	7-2	Verdy Kawasaki	Osaka Nagai Stadium
JST (UTC+09)

=== J.League Cup ===
7 April 1999 1st Round-1	Ventforet Kofu	0-2	Verdy Kawasaki	Kose Sports Park Stadium
JST (UTC+09)

14 April 1999 1st Round-2	Verdy Kawasaki	1-1 (3-1 agg.)	Ventforet Kofu	Todoroki Athletics Stadium
JST (UTC+09)

12 June 1999 2nd Round-1	Verdy Kawasaki	0-3	Nagoya Grampus Eight	Iwate Athletic Stadium
JST (UTC+09)

19 June 1999 2nd Round-2	Nagoya Grampus Eight	4-2 (7-2 agg.)	Verdy Kawasaki	Mizuho Athletic Stadium
JST (UTC+09)

== Player statistics ==
No.	Pos.	Nat.	Player	D.o.B. (Age)	Height / Weight	J.League 1		Emperor's Cup		J.League Cup		Total	
No.	Pos.	Nat.	Player	D.o.B. (Age)	Height / Weight	Apps	Goals	Apps	Goals	Apps	Goals	Apps	Goals
1	GK	(Japan)	Shinkichi Kikuchi	April 12, 1967 (aged 31)	cm / kg	0	0						
2	DF	(Japan)	Takuya Yamada	August 24, 1974 (aged 24)	cm / kg	29	3						
3	DF	(Brazil)	Júlio César	May 12, 1980 (aged 18)	cm / kg	5	0						
4	MF	(Japan)	Kentaro Hayashi	August 29, 1972 (aged 26)	cm / kg	29	7						
5	DF	(Japan)	Atsushi Yoneyama	November 20, 1976 (aged 22)	cm / kg	29	2						
6	DF	(Japan)	Tadashi Nakamura	June 10, 1971 (aged 27)	cm / kg	6	0						
6	MF	(Japan)	Yuji Hironaga	July 25, 1975 (aged 23)	cm / kg	5	0						
7	MF	(Japan)	Takahiro Yamada	April 29, 1972 (aged 26)	cm / kg	27	1						
8	MF	(Japan)	Tsuyoshi Kitazawa	August 10, 1968 (aged 30)	cm / kg	28	4						
9	MF	(Japan)	Keisuke Kurihara	May 20, 1973 (aged 25)	cm / kg	24	6						
10	MF	(Japan)	Takayuki Yamaguchi	August 1, 1973 (aged 25)	cm / kg	4	0						
11	MF	(Brazil)	Jefferson	February 28, 1978 (aged 21)	cm / kg	21	3						
12	DF	(Japan)	Takayuki Nishigaya	May 12, 1973 (aged 25)	cm / kg	3	0						
13	MF	(Japan)	Masakazu Senuma	September 7, 1978 (aged 20)	cm / kg	1	0						
14	FW	(Brazil)	Henrique	December 24, 1976 (aged 22)	cm / kg	16	2						
15	DF	(Japan)	Koichi Sugiyama	October 27, 1971 (aged 27)	cm / kg	26	1						
16	DF	(Japan)	Kazuya Iio	April 10, 1980 (aged 18)	cm / kg	1	0						
17	MF	(Japan)	Yoshiyuki Kobayashi	January 27, 1978 (aged 21)	cm / kg	30	2						
18	FW	(Japan)	Takuya Takagi	November 12, 1967 (aged 31)	cm / kg	18	2						
19	GK	(Japan)	Kiyomitsu Kobari	June 12, 1977 (aged 21)	cm / kg	1	0						
20	MF	(Japan)	Naoki Makino	November 11, 1976 (aged 22)	cm / kg	2	0						
21	GK	(Japan)	Kenji Honnami	June 23, 1964 (aged 34)	cm / kg	29	0						
22	DF	(Japan)	Yuji Nakazawa	February 25, 1978 (aged 21)	cm / kg	28	1						
23	FW	(Japan)	Hiroaki Tanaka	April 17, 1979 (aged 19)	cm / kg	0	0						
24	DF	(Japan)	Yusuke Mori	July 24, 1980 (aged 18)	cm / kg	1	0						
25	FW	(Japan)	Keiji Ishizuka	August 26, 1974 (aged 24)	cm / kg	17	3						
26	FW	(Japan)	Kazunori Iio	February 23, 1982 (aged 17)	cm / kg	4	0						
27	FW	(Japan)	Kazuki Hiramoto	August 18, 1981 (aged 17)	cm / kg	6	1						
32	FW	(Japan)	Naoto Sakurai	September 2, 1975 (aged 23)	cm / kg	14	4						
33	DF	(Japan)	Masahiro Endo	August 15, 1970 (aged 28)	cm / kg	3	0						
34	DF	(Japan)	Kenichiro Tokura	May 31, 1971 (aged 27)	cm / kg	2	0						
35	FW	(Japan)	Hayato Yano	October 29, 1980 (aged 18)	cm / kg	2	0						

== Other pages ==
- (in Japanese) J.League official site
