= Jefferson (footballer, born 1978) =

Brazilian footballer

Personal information
- Full name: Jefferson Fredo Rodrigues
- Date of birth: February 28, 1978 (age 48)
- Place of birth: Brazil
- Height: 1.75 m (5 ft 9 in)
- Position: Midfielder

Senior career*
Years	Team	Apps	(Gls)
1999	Verdy Kawasaki	21	(3)
- * Club domestic league appearances and goals

Jefferson Fredo Rodrigues (born February 28, 1978) is a former Brazilian football player.

== Playing career ==
Jefferson joined Japanese J1 League club Verdy Kawasaki in 1999. He played many matches as offensive midfielder with many young players due to financial strain end of 1998 season. Verdy finished at the 7th place in 1999 season. He left the club end of 1999 season.

== Career statistics ==
Appearances and goals by club, season and competition
Club	Season	League			Emperor's Cup		J.League Cup		Total	
Club	Season	Division	Apps	Goals	Apps	Goals	Apps	Goals	Apps	Goals
Verdy Kawasaki	1999	J1 League	21	3	1	0	3	2	25	5
Career total			21	3	1	0	3	2	25	5
