= Jailton =

Jailton is a Portuguese given name. Jailton may refer to:

- Dinda (born 1972), Jailton dos Santos, Brazilian football midfielder
- Jailton (footballer, born 1974), Jailton Nunes de Oliveira, Brazilian football midfielder
- Jaílton (footballer, born 1982), Paulo Jaílton da Cruz Alves, Brazilian football midfielder
- Kuca (footballer) (born 1989), Jaílton Alves Miranda, Cape Verdean football forward
- Jaílton Paraíba (born 1990), Jaílton Lourenço da Silva, Brazilian football winger
