= Henrique (footballer, born 1976) =

Brazilian footballer

Personal information
- Full name: Carlos Henrique Raimundo Rodrigues
- Date of birth: December 24, 1976 (age 49)
- Place of birth: Brazil
- Height: 1.78 m (5 ft 10 in)
- Position: Forward

Senior career*
Years	Team	Apps	(Gls)
1994–1997	Criciúma		
1998	Sampaio Corrêa		
1999	Verdy Kawasaki	16	(2)
2000–2002	Sampaio Corrêa		
2003–2006	Dong Tam Long An		
2007	Ninh Binh		
2008	Binh Dinh		
2009	Quang Ngai		
- * Club domestic league appearances and goals

Carlos Henrique Raimundo Rodrigues (born December 24, 1976), known as just Henrique, is a former Brazilian football player.

== Playing career ==
Henrique joined Japanese J1 League club Verdy Kawasaki in 1999. He played many matches as forward with many young players due to financial strain end of 1998 season. Verdy finished at the 7th place in 1999 season. He left the club end of 1999 season.

== Club statistics ==
Club performance			League		Cup		League Cup		Total	
Season	Club	League	Apps	Goals	Apps	Goals	Apps	Goals	Apps	Goals
Japan			League		Emperor's Cup		J.League Cup		Total	
1999	Verdy Kawasaki	J1 League	16	2	0	0	3	0	19	2
Total			16	2	0	0	3	0	19	2
