= Neto Potiguar =

Brazilian footballer

Personal information
- Full name: Antonio Carlos da Silva Neto
- Date of birth: October 29, 1985 (age 41)
- Place of birth: Natal, Brazil
- Height: 1.74 m (5 ft 8 1/2 in)
- Position: Forward

Team information
- Current team: Club Celaya

Youth career
- Bahia

Senior career*
| Years | Team | Apps | (Gls) |
| 2004–2007 | Bahia | | |
| 2005 | → Albirex Niigata (loan) | 1 | (0) |
| 2006 | → Marília (loan) | | |
| 2007 | → Gama (loan) | | |
| 2008 | Atlético Goianiense | | |
| 2008 | ABC | | |
| 2008 | Caxias | | |
| 2009 | Anápolis | | |
| 2009 | Guarani | 2 | (0) |
| 2009 | Paysandu | | |
| 2010 | Lobos BUAP | 8 | (2) |
| 2010–2011 | Caldense | | |
| 2012 | ASA | | |
| 2013 | Itumbiara | | |
| 2014– | Club Celaya | | |
- * Club domestic league appearances and goals

Antonio Carlos da Silva Neto (born October 29, 1985), known as Neto Potiguar, is a Brazilian footballer who currently plays for Club Celaya.

== Club statistics ==
| Club performance | | | League | | Cup | | League Cup | | Total | |
| Season | Club | League | Apps | Goals | Apps | Goals | Apps | Goals | Apps | Goals |
| Japan | | | League | | Emperor's Cup | | J.League Cup | | Total | |
|---|---|---|---|---|---|---|---|---|---|---|
| 2005 | Albirex Niigata | J1 League | 1 | 0 | | | | | | |
| Country | Japan | | 1 | 0 | | | | | | |
| Total | | | 1 | 0 | | | | | | |
