= Magnum (footballer) =

Brazilian footballer

Personal information
- Full name: Magnum Rafael Farias Tavares
- Date of birth: March 24, 1982 (age 44)
- Place of birth: Belém, Brazil
- Height: 1.74 m (5 ft 8 1/2 in)
- Position: Attacking midfielder

Youth career
- 2000–2001: Carajás

Senior career*
Years	Team	Apps	(Gls)
2002	Tuna Luso		
2002–2003	Paysandu	35	(6)
2004–2005	Vitória		
2005	Iraty	28	(1)
2005	→ Santos (loan)	5	(0)
2006	Iraty		
2006–2007	Kawasaki Frontale	38	(11)
2008–2010	Nagoya Grampus	48	(12)
2011	Ulsan Hyundai	4	(0)
2011	São Caetano	5	(0)
2012	Remo		
- * Club domestic league appearances and goals as of 21 July 2011

Magnum Rafael Farias Tavares or simply Magnum (born March 24, 1982, in Belém) is a Brazilian professional footballer, who plays as left-sided attacking midfielder.

Magnum previously played for Paysandu, Vitória Santos, Japanese side Kawasaki Frontale and Nagoya Grampus.

== Club statistics ==
Club performance			League		Cup		League Cup		Continental		Total	
Season	Club	League	Apps	Goals	Apps	Goals	Apps	Goals	Apps	Goals	Apps	Goals
Brazil			League		Copa do Brasil		League Cup		South America		Total	
2002	Paysandu	Série A	5	1							5	1
2003	Paysandu	Série A	30	5							30	5
2004	Vitória	Série A	30	1							30	1
2005	Vitória	Série B										
2006	Santos	Série A	5	0							5	0
Japan			League		Emperor's Cup		J.League Cup		Asia		Total	
2006	Kawasaki Frontale	J1 League	19	4	2	0	2	1	-		23	5
2007	Kawasaki Frontale	J1 League	19	7	2	0	2	0	7	3	30	10
2008	Nagoya Grampus Eight	J1 League	26	8	2	0	7	0	-		35	8
2009	Nagoya Grampus Eight	J1 League	22	4	3	0	1	0	8	1	34	5
2010	Nagoya Grampus Eight	J1 League	31	2	2	1	2	0	-		35	3
Korea Republic			League		FA Cup		K-League Cup		Asia		Total	
2011	Ulsan Hyundai	K-League	4	0	1	0	1	0	-		6	0
Country	Brazil		70	7							70	7
Country	Japan		117	25	11	1	14	1	15	4	157	31
Country	Korea Republic		4	0	1	0	1	0	-		6	0
Total			191	32	12	1	15	1	15	4	233	38
