= 1999 J.League Division 1 =

7th season of J1 League

J.League Division 1
- Season: 1999
- Champions: Júbilo Iwata; 2nd J.League title 3rd Japanese title
- Relegated: Urawa Red Diamonds; Bellmare Hiratsuka
- Asian Club Championship: Júbilo Iwata
- Matches: 240
- Goals: 757 (3.15 per match)
- Top goalscorer: Hwang Sun-hong (24 goals)
- Highest attendance: 51,575 – Antlers vs. Júbilo (May 5)
- Lowest attendance: 2,411 – Vissel vs. Avispa (April 17)
- Average attendance: 11,658

The 1999 J.League Division 1 season was the seventh season of the J.League Division 1. The league began in March 6 and ended in November 27. For this year, the division was contested by 16 teams following the folding of Yokohama Flügels and the relegation of Consadole Sapporo to the newly formed Division 2.

The season took place on the Shizuoka Prefecture. Júbilo Iwata won the 1st stage and Shimizu S-Pulse won the 2nd stage. Iwata won the J.League Division 1 title after triumphing on penalty kicks in the Suntory Championship.

== Clubs ==
The following sixteen clubs participated in J.League Division 1 during 1999 season:

Club	Last season		Head coach
Avispa Fukuoka	18th	15th	(Japan) Yoshio Kikugawa
Bellmare Hiratsuka	12th	12th	(Japan) Mitsuru Komaeda
Cerezo Osaka	9th	13th	(Belgium) René Desaeyere
Gamba Osaka	14th	16th	(Japan) Hiroshi Hayano
JEF United Ichihara	11th	18th	(Romania) Nicolae Zamfir
Júbilo Iwata	1st	2nd	(Japan) Takashi Kuwahara
Kashima Antlers	5th	1st	(Brazil) Zico
Kashiwa Reysol	10th	8th	(Japan) Akira Nishino
Kyoto Purple Sanga	15th	11th	(Japan) Shu Kamo
Nagoya Grampus Eight	3rd	6th	(Brazil) João Carlos
Sanfrecce Hiroshima	13th	9th	(Scotland) Eddie Thomson
Shimizu S-Pulse	2nd	5th	(England) Steve Perryman
Urawa Red Diamonds	7th	3rd	(Netherlands) Aad de Mos
Verdy Kawasaki	6th	17th	(Japan) Hideki Matsunaga
Vissel Kobe	17th	14th	(Japan) Ryoichi Kawakatsu
Yokohama F. Marinos	4th	4th	(Spain) Antonio de la Cruz

=== Foreign players ===
Club	Player 1	Player 2	Player 3	Non-visa foreign	Type-C contract	Former players
Avispa Fukuoka	(Brazil) Fernando	(Brazil) Ranielli	(Federal Republic of Yugoslavia) Nenad Maslovar			(Paraguay) Juan Carlos Villamayor
Bellmare Hiratsuka	(Australia) Chay Hews	(Australia) Stephen Laybutt	(Brazil) Jailton			(Brazil) Cláudio (Brazil) Ricardinho (Romania) Pavel Badea
Cerezo Osaka	(Brazil) Pericles	(South Korea) Hwang Sun-hong	(South Korea) Noh Jung-yoon			
Gamba Osaka	(Brazil) Luizinho Vieira	(Brazil) Taílson	(French Guiana) Claude Dambury			(Federal Republic of Yugoslavia) Anto Drobnjak (Poland) Piotr Świerczewski
JEF United Ichihara	(Brazil) Baron	(Netherlands) Peter Bosz	(Romania) Robert Vancea	(South Korea) Kim Hwang-jung	(Paraguay) Roberto Blanco	(Brazil) Paulo Henrique
Júbilo Iwata	(Brazil) Adilson Batista	(Paraguay) Roberto Torres	(Russia) Dmitri Radchenko			
Kashima Antlers	(Brazil) Bismarck	(Brazil) Mazinho	(Brazil) Ricardo			
Kashiwa Reysol	(Brazil) Bentinho	(Romania) Pavel Badea	(South Korea) Hong Myung-bo			(Bulgaria) Hristo Stoichkov
Kyoto Purple Sanga	(Brazil) Paulo Magino	(Brazil) Paulo Silas	(Brazil) Sidiclei	(South Korea) Park Kang-jo		(Brazil) Nasa
Nagoya Grampus Eight	(Brazil) Alexandre Torres	(Federal Republic of Yugoslavia) Dragan Stojković	(Netherlands) Tarik Oulida	(Bolivia) Ko Ishikawa		
Sanfrecce Hiroshima	(Australia) Hayden Foxe	(Australia) Phil Stubbins	(Australia) Tony Popovic			(Australia) Aurelio Vidmar
Shimizu S-Pulse	(Brazil) Fabinho	(Brazil) Santos		(Brazil) Alex		
Urawa Red Diamonds	(Federal Republic of Yugoslavia) Željko Petrović	(Spain) Txiki Begiristain	(Uruguay) Fernando Picun			(Italy) Giuseppe Zappella
Verdy Kawasaki	(Brazil) Henrique	(Brazil) Jefferson			(Brazil) Júlio César	
Vissel Kobe	(South Korea) Choi Sung-yong	(South Korea) Ha Seok-ju	(South Korea) Kim Do-hoon	(South Korea) Park Song-gi		
Yokohama F. Marinos	(Brazil) Válber	(Croatia) Igor Jovićević	(South Korea) Yoo Sang-chul			

== Overview ==
=== First stage ===
Pos	Team	Pld	W	OTW	D	OTL	L	GF	GA	GD	Pts	Qualification
1	Júbilo Iwata	15	10	2	0	1	2	29	15	+14	34	Qualification to the Suntory Championship 1999
2	Verdy Kawasaki	15	9	2	1	0	3	20	15	+5	32	
3	Shimizu S-Pulse	15	9	1	1	0	4	28	23	+5	30	
4	Kashiwa Reysol	15	9	1	0	1	4	26	18	+8	29	
5	Cerezo Osaka	15	9	1	0	0	5	25	21	+4	29	
6	Sanfrecce Hiroshima	15	9	0	0	0	6	30	18	+12	27	
7	Yokohama F. Marinos	15	6	2	1	1	5	31	20	+11	23	
8	Nagoya Grampus Eight	15	6	1	1	3	4	30	23	+7	21	
9	Kashima Antlers (Note: Champion from 1998 J.League)	15	5	1	1	2	6	23	19	+4	18	
10	Gamba Osaka	15	5	1	0	1	8	21	25	−4	17	
11	Avispa Fukuoka	15	4	2	0	1	8	23	30	−7	16	
12	Vissel Kobe	15	4	1	1	2	7	20	24	−4	15	
13	Urawa Red Diamonds	15	3	0	4	2	6	21	33	−12	13	
14	Kyoto Purple Sanga	15	4	0	0	2	9	18	28	−10	12	
15	JEF United Ichihara	15	2	2	2	1	8	19	34	−15	12	
16	Bellmare Hiratsuka	15	3	0	0	0	12	15	33	−18	9	

Source: RSSSF

=== Second stage ===
Pos	Team	Pld	W	OTW	D	OTL	L	GF	GA	GD	Pts	Qualification
1	Shimizu S-Pulse	15	11	1	0	1	2	28	13	+15	35	Qualification to the Suntory Championship 1999
2	Nagoya Grampus Eight	15	10	1	1	0	3	32	23	+9	33	
3	Yokohama F. Marinos	15	8	2	2	0	3	30	15	+15	30	
4	Kashiwa Reysol	15	8	2	1	0	4	23	18	+5	29	
5	Cerezo Osaka	15	6	3	0	1	5	39	24	+15	24	
6	Kashima Antlers (Note: Champion from 1998 J.League)	15	6	2	0	2	5	30	18	+12	22	
7	Vissel Kobe	15	5	2	3	0	5	18	21	−3	22	
8	Sanfrecce Hiroshima	15	6	1	1	2	5	24	25	−1	21	
9	Kyoto Purple Sanga	15	5	2	0	2	6	20	30	−10	19	
10	Verdy Kawasaki	15	4	2	1	2	6	23	28	−5	17	
11	JEF United Ichihara	15	4	2	0	3	6	22	22	0	16	
12	Júbilo Iwata	15	4	1	1	2	7	23	27	−4	15	
13	Gamba Osaka	15	4	1	1	1	8	15	21	−6	15	
14	Urawa Red Diamonds	15	4	1	1	5	4	18	25	−7	15	
15	Avispa Fukuoka	15	3	1	1	0	10	18	29	−11	12	
16	Bellmare Hiratsuka	15	1	0	1	3	10	15	39	−24	4	

Source: RSSSF

=== Suntory Championship ===
December 4, 1999
15:03

Júbilo Iwata	2–1 (a.e.t.)	Shimizu S-Pulse
Nakayama 30', 98'	Official Report	34' Sawanobori

Yamaha Stadium, Iwata
Attendance: 17,337
Referee: Leslie Mottram

December 11, 1999
19:33

Shimizu S-Pulse	2–1 (a.e.t.)	Júbilo Iwata
Sawanobori 37'; Fabinho 99'	Official Report	34' Hattori
Penalties
Sawanobori (penalty scored); Santos (penalty missed); Ito (penalty scored); Fabinho (penalty missed)	2–4	(penalty scored) Hattori; (penalty scored) Fujita; (penalty scored) Takahara; (penalty scored) Suzuki

Nihondaira Sports Stadium, Shizuoka
Attendance: 20,309
Referee: Masayoshi Okada

== Overall table ==
Pos	Team	Pld	W	OTW	D	OTL	L	GF	GA	GD	Pts	Qualification or relegation
1/2	Shimizu S-Pulse	30	20	2	1	1	6	56	36	+20	65	
1/2	Júbilo Iwata	30	14	3	1	3	9	52	42	+10	49	Champion and qualified to the Asian Club Championship 2000–01 Second Round
3	Kashiwa Reysol	30	17	3	1	1	8	49	36	+13	58	
4	Nagoya Grampus Eight	30	16	2	2	3	7	62	46	+16	54	Cup-Winner 1999 Emperor's Cup and qualified to the Asian Cup Winners' Cup 2000–01 Second Round
5	Yokohama F. Marinos	30	14	4	3	1	8	61	35	+26	53	
6	Cerezo Osaka	30	15	4	0	1	10	64	45	+19	53	
7	Verdy Kawasaki	30	13	4	2	2	9	43	43	0	49	
8	Sanfrecce Hiroshima	30	15	1	1	2	11	54	43	+11	48	
9	Kashima Antlers (Note: Champion from 1998 J.League)	30	11	3	1	4	11	53	37	+16	40	
10	Vissel Kobe	30	9	3	4	2	12	38	45	−7	37	
11	Gamba Osaka	30	9	2	1	2	16	36	46	−10	32	
12	Kyoto Purple Sanga	30	9	2	0	4	15	38	58	−20	31	
13	JEF United Ichihara	30	6	4	2	4	14	41	56	−15	28	
14	Avispa Fukuoka	30	7	3	1	1	18	41	59	−18	28	
15	Urawa Red Diamonds	30	7	1	5	7	10	39	58	−19	28	Relegated to the 2000 J.League Division 2
16	Bellmare Hiratsuka	30	4	0	1	3	22	30	72	−42	13	Relegated to the 2000 J.League Division 2

Source: J.League data site

== Awards ==
- Most Valuable Player: (Brazil) Alex (Shimizu S-Pulse)
- Top Scorer: (South Korea) Hwang Sun-hong (Cerezo Osaka)
