= Luis Alberto =

Luis Alberto may refer to:

- Luis Alberto (footballer, born 1943), Argentine football attacking midfielder
- Luís Alberto (footballer, born 1983), Luís Alberto Silva dos Santos, Brazilian football midfielder
- Luis Alberto (footballer, born 1992), Luis Alberto Romero Alconchel, Spanish football attacking midfielder
- Luis Alberto Lamata, Venezuelan film director
- Luis Alberto, winner of the 1986 art prize of the Prince Pierre Foundation

== See also ==
- Luiz Alberto (disambiguation)
