= Moon Je-chun =

South Korean footballer

Moon Je-Chun
Personal information
- Full name: Moon Je-Chun
- Date of birth: April 15, 1987 (age 39)
- Place of birth: Seoul, South Korea
- Height: 1.80 m (5 ft 11 in)
- Position: Defender

Youth career
- 2003–2005: Moonil High School

Senior career*
Years	Team	Apps	(Gls)
2005–2006	Tokyo Verdy	0	(0)
2008	Sportakademklub Moscow	6	(0)

International career
2005	U-18 South Korea		
- * Club domestic league appearances and goals

Moon Je-Chun (Hanja: 文済天, born April 15, 1987) is a South Korean football player. As of April 2009, he is a free agent.

Moon previously played for the football club Sportakademklub Moscow in the Russian First Division.

== Club statistics ==
Club performance			League		Cup		League Cup		Total	
Season	Club	League	Apps	Goals	Apps	Goals	Apps	Goals	Apps	Goals
Japan			League		Emperor's Cup		J.League Cup		Total	
2005	Tokyo Verdy	J1 League	0	0	1	0	1	0	2	0
2006	Tokyo Verdy	J2 League	0	0	0	0	-		0	0
Country	Japan		0	0	1	0	1	0	2	0
Total			0	0	1	0	1	0	2	0
