= Paulo Ricardo (footballer, born 1987) =

Brazilian footballer

Personal information
- Full name: Paulo Ricardo Alves da Silva
- Date of birth: 17 August 1987 (age 39)
- Place of birth: Magé, Brazil
- Height: 1.80 m (5 ft 11 in)
- Position: Right-back

Youth career
- 2004–2005: Santos

Senior career*
Years	Team	Apps	(Gls)
2006–2007	Santos	1	(0)
2007	→ Santa Cruz (loan)	0	(0)
2007	Tigres do Brasil		
2008	Legião		
2008–2009	Brasiliense		
2009	Atlético Goianiense	5	(0)
2010	Anapolina	0	(0)
2010–2011	Ceilândia	4	(0)
2011	Santa Helena	5	(0)
2011	Anápolis	9	(1)
2012	Camboriú	13	(1)
2013	Comercial-SP	22	(1)
2013	Mogi Mirim	5	(0)
2014	Sampaio Corrêa	4	(0)
2012	Camboriú	17	(1)
2015	Brasília		
2016	Juventus de Jaraguá	2	(0)
- * Club domestic league appearances and goals

Paulo Ricardo Alves da Silva (born 17 August 1987), known as Paulo Ricardo or simply Paulo, is a Brazilian former professional footballer who played as a right-back.

== Career ==
Paulo played for Santa Cruz on loan from Santos in the 2007 season.

He made his professional debut and only appearance that season in a 4–3 away defeat to Botafogo on 14 October 2006.

Paulo played in Serie B with Sampaio Corrêa Futebol Clube.
