= Iran (footballer, born 1979) =

Brazilian footballer (born 1979)

Personal information
- Full name: Iran Andrielle Villahaylobos de Oliveira
- Date of birth: June 14, 1979 (age 47)
- Place of birth: Boa Esperança, Brazil
- Height: 1.76 m (5 ft 9 in)
- Position: Left back

Team information
- Current team: Campinense

Youth career
- 1997–1998: Campinas-SP

Senior career*
Years	Team	Apps	(Gls)
1999–2003	Campinas-SP		
2004	Mixto		
2004	Rio Claro-SP		
2004	SE Vila Aurora-MT		
2005	Atlético Paranavaí		
2005–2006	Ponte Preta	35	(4)
2007	Botafogo	8	(0)
2007	→ Corinthians (Loan)		
2008	Botafogo		
2009	São Caetano	5	(0)
2011–	Campinense		
- * Club domestic league appearances and goals

Iran Andrielle Villahaylobos de Oliveira or simply Iran (born June 14, 1979), is a Brazilian left back.

== Honours ==
- Taça Rio: 2007
