= André Beleza =

Brazilian footballer (born 1985)

Personal information
- Full name: André Oliveira de Lima
- Date of birth: 20 April 1985 (age 41)
- Place of birth: Natal, Brazil
- Height: 1.69 m (5 ft 7 in)
- Position: Attacking midfielder

Team information
- Current team: Itabaiana

Youth career
- 2001–2002: Ceará

Senior career*
Years	Team	Apps	(Gls)
2003–2004	Ceará		
2005	Iraty		
2006	→ Santos (loan)	25	(1)
2007–2009	1. FC Köln	20	(0)
2008	→ Náutico (loan)	4	(0)
2009–2010	Iraty		
2010	→ ABC (loan)		
2011	Botafogo-PB		
2011–2012	América-RN	7	(2)
2013	Itabaiana	4	(1)
2013	Sampaio Corrêa	8	(0)
2014	Goianésia	13	(2)
2014	Santos-AP	6	(1)
2015	Vitória da Conquista	12	(3)
2015	Treze	8	(1)
2016	Ríver-PI	0	(0)
2016	Portuguesa	0	(0)
2017–	Itabaiana	0	(0)
- * Club domestic league appearances and goals as of 19 May 2016

André Oliveira de Lima (born 20 April 1985), known as André Oliveira or André Beleza, is a Brazilian footballer who plays as an attacking midfielder.

He moved to 2. Bundesliga side 1. FC Köln after Iraty sold him to the German club on 3 January 2007.
