= Marinho Donizete =

Brazilian footballer

Personal information
- Full name: Mário Donizete Oliveira Ferreira
- Date of birth: July 31, 1980 (age 46)
- Place of birth: Uberlândia (MG - Brazil)
- Height: 1.66 m (5 ft 5 in)
- Position: Left back

Team information
- Current team: Sergipe

Senior career*
Years	Team	Apps	(Gls)
2001–2002	Uberlândia		
2005–2011	Ipatinga		
2008	→ Ituiutaba (loan)		
2009	→ Uberlândia (loan)		
2011	Criciúma		
2011	Boa Esporte		
2012	Red Bull Brasil		
2012–2013	Fortaleza		
2014	Boa Esporte		
2015–2016	Vila Nova		
2016–2017	Anápolis		
2017	Uberlândia		
2017	URT		
2018–	Sergipe		
- * Club domestic league appearances and goals as of April 30, 2014

Mário Donizete Oliveira Ferreira, known as Marinho Donizete, (born July 31, 1980), is a Brazilian defender who currently plays for Sergipe.

== Honours ==
Vila Nova

- Campeonato Goiano Série B: 2015
- Campeonato Brasileiro Série C: 2015
