= Márcio Guerreiro =

Brazilian footballer

Personal information
- Full name: Márcio Luis Marques Guimarães
- Date of birth: March 6, 1981 (age 45)
- Place of birth: Nova Iguaçu, Brazil
- Height: 1.82 m (6 ft 0 in)
- Position: Midfielder

Team information
- Current team: Villa Nova-MG

Youth career
- 2000–2002: Nova Iguaçu

Senior career*
Years	Team	Apps	(Gls)
2003	Anápolis-GO (Loan)		
2004	Portuguesa-RJ (Loan)		
2004	Volta Redonda (Loan)		
2005	Flamengo (Loan)		
2006	Ipatinga (Loan)		
2006	Cruzeiro		
2006	Villa Nova-MG (Loan)		
2007	Cruzeiro		
2007	Ponte Preta (Loan)		
2008	Villa Nova-MG (Loan)		
- * Club domestic league appearances and goals

Márcio Luis Marques Guimarães or simply Márcio Guerreiro (born March 6, 1981, in Nova Iguaçu), is a Brazilian right-sided midfielder. He currently plays for Villa Nova-MG on loan from Cruzeiro.

Márcio Guerreiro has played for Villa Nova-MG and Ipatinga in the Copa do Brasil.

== Honours ==
- Rio de Janeiro State League (2nd division): 2004

== Contract ==
- Villa Nova-MG (Loan) 1 January 2008 to 15 May 2008
- Cruzeiro 6 April 2006 to 5 April 2009
- Nova iguaçu Encerrou a carreira em 17/12/2013.
