= Galvão (footballer) =

Brazilian footballer (born 1982)

Personal information
- Full name: José Antônio Martins Galvão
- Date of birth: July 8, 1982 (age 44)
- Place of birth: Lins, Brazil
- Height: 1.87 m (6 ft 2 in)
- Position: Striker

Youth career
- 1999–2000: União São João

Senior career*
Years	Team	Apps	(Gls)
2001–2002	União São João		
2003	Servette	13	(0)
2003	União São João	11	(6)
2004	Paraná	42	(16)
2005	Sanfrecce Hiroshima	33	(9)
2006	Santos	8	(0)
2006–2007	Atlético Mineiro	16	(1)
2008	São Caetano		
2008	Bahia		
2009	Vila Nova		
2009	Ventforet Kofu	10	(1)
2010–2011	Boavista		
2010–2011	→ Duque de Caxias (loan)	16	(2)
- * Club domestic league appearances and goals

José Antônio Martins Galvão (born July 8, 1982), also known simply as Galvão, is a Brazilian former professional footballer who played as a striker. He played in the top division in Brazil, Switzerland and Japan.

== Career statistics ==
Club performance			League		Cup		League Cup		Total	
Season	Club	League	Apps	Goals	Apps	Goals	Apps	Goals	Apps	Goals
Brazil			League		Copa do Brasil		League Cup		Total	
2001	União São João	Série B	0	0					0	0
2002	União São João	Série B	25	14					25	14
Switzerland			League		Schweizer Cup		League Cup		Total	
2002/03	Servette	Nationalliga A	13	0					13	0
Brazil			League		Copa do Brasil		League Cup		Total	
2003	União São João	Série B	0	0					0	0
2004	Paraná	Série A	42	15					42	15
Japan			League		Emperor's Cup		J.League Cup		Total	
2005	Sanfrecce Hiroshima	J1 League	33	9	2	1	5	3	40	13
Brazil			League		Copa do Brasil		League Cup		Total	
2006	Santos	Série A	1	0					1	0
2006	Atlético Mineiro	Série B	18	7					18	7
2007	Atlético Mineiro	Série A	17	1					17	1
2008	São Caetano	Série B	0	0					0	0
2008	Bahia	Série B	17	5					17	5
2009	Vila Nova	Série B	0	0					0	0
Japan			League		Emperor's Cup		J.League Cup		Total	
2009	Ventforet Kofu	J2 League	10	1	0	0	-		10	1
Country	Brazil		120	42					120	42
Country	Switzerland		13	0					13	0
Country	Japan		43	10	2	1	5	3	50	14
Total			176	52	2	1	5	3	183	56

== Honours ==
- São Paulo State League: 2006
- Brazilian League (2nd division): 2006
- Minas Gerais State League: 2007
