= Léo Lima =

Brazilian footballer

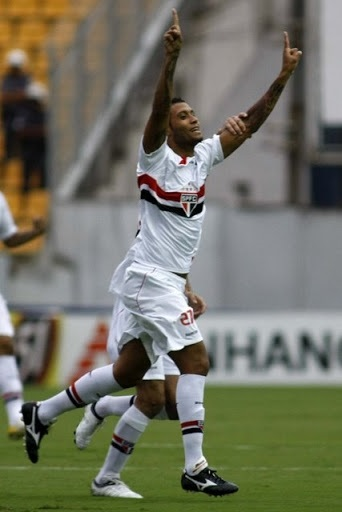
- Léo Lima in 2010

Personal information
- Full name: Leonardo Lima da Silva
- Date of birth: 14 January 1982 (age 44)
- Place of birth: Rio de Janeiro, Brazil
- Height: 1.85 m (6 ft 1 in)
- Position: Attacking midfielder

Youth career
- 1998–1999: Madureira
- 1999–2000: Vasco da Gama

Senior career*
Years	Team	Apps	(Gls)
2001–2003	Vasco da Gama	49	(4)
2003	CSKA Sofia	8	(3)
2004–2005	Marítimo	25	(2)
2005–2007	Porto	7	(0)
2006	→ Santos (loan)	11	(0)
2006–2007	→ Grêmio (loan)	16	(2)
2007	Flamengo	7	(0)
2008	Palmeiras	26	(1)
2009	Vasco da Gama	8	(1)
2009	→ Goiás (loan)	21	(7)
2010	São Paulo	2	(1)
2010–2016	Al-Nasr (Dubai)	81	(15)
2014–2016	→ Al Sharjah (loan)	11	(1)
2016–2017	Goiás	18	(5)
2017	Santa Cruz	9	(1)
2018	Madureira	3	(0)
2019	Anapolina	2	(0)

International career
1999	Brazil U17		
2001	Brazil U20		
2003	Brazil U23	4	(0)
- * Club domestic league appearances and goals

Leonardo Lima da Silva (born 14 January 1982) is a Brazilian former professional footballer who played as an attacking midfielder. He played for teams such as Vasco da Gama, CSKA Sofia, Marítimo, Porto, Flamengo and Al-Nasr (Dubai).
