= Fabiano (footballer, born 1984) =

Brazilian footballer

Personal information
- Full name: Fabiano Vieira Soares
- Date of birth: July 25, 1984 (age 42)
- Place of birth: Américo Brasiliense, Brazil
- Height: 1.84 m (6 ft 1/2 in)
- Position: Striker

Youth career
- 2003–2004: PSV Eindhoven

Senior career*
| Years | Team | Apps | (Gls) |
| 2004 | Bangu | | |
| 2005 | Atlético Sorocaba | 14 | (7) |
| 2005–2010 | Santos | 11 | (2) |
| 2006 | → Guarani (loan) | | |
| 2007 | → Sport (loan) | 7 | (0) |
| 2010 | → Sorocaba (loan) | | |
| 2010 | Ipatinga | 17 | (3) |
| 2011 | Paulista | | |
| 2011–2012 | Villa Nova | | |
| 2012 | Thun | 5 | (0) |
| 2013 | São Carlos | 13 | (3) |
- * Club domestic league appearances and goals

Fabiano Vieira Soares or simply Fabiano (born July 25, 1984) is a former Brazilian football striker.
