= Júlio César (footballer, born May 1980) =

Brazilian footballer

Personal information
- Full name: Júlio César Rocha Costa
- Date of birth: 12 May 1980 (age 46)
- Place of birth: Santos, Brazil
- Height: 1.74 m (5 ft 8 1/2 in)
- Position: Defensive midfielder

Team information
- Current team: Ferroviária

Senior career*
| Years | Team | Apps | (Gls) |
- Bangu
| 1999 | Verdy Kawasaki | 5 | (0) |
| 2004–2005 | Osasco | | |
| 2005 | → Portuguesa Santista (loan) | 0 | (0) |
| 2005–2006 | São Caetano | | |
| 2007 | Juventude | 18 | (0) |
| 2008 | Caxias | | |
| 2008 | Gama | 14 | (0) |
| 2009 | Mogi Mirim | 0 | (0) |
| 2009 | Caxias | 4 | (0) |
| 2009–2011 | Noroeste | 0 | (0) |
| 2010 | → Criciúma (loan) | 1 | (0) |
| 2011 | Marília | 6 | (0) |
| 2011 | Icasa | 6 | (0) |
| 2012– | Ferroviária | | |
- * Club domestic league appearances and goals

Júlio César Rocha Costa (born 12 May 1980), known as just Júlio César, is a Brazilian football player. He currently plays for Ferroviaria Futebol S.A.

== Biography ==
Júlio César signed a 3-year deal with Osasco in January 2004. He left for Portuguesa Santista in December 2004 until the end of 2005 Campeonato Paulista. In April he was sold to São Caetano, signing 3-year contract.

In 2007, he joined Juventude. He left for fellow Rio Grande do Sul club Caxias in January 2008 in 1-year contract. In September he left for Gamain short-term deal. In January 2009 he was signed by Mogi Mirim until the end of 2009 Campeonato Paulista. In April he was re-signed by Caxias. In August 2009 he left for Noroeste in 1-year deal. In May 2010 he signed a new 1-year deal and left for Criciúma. After his contract with Noroeste expired, he joined Marília and in September left for ICASA in short-term deal.

== Club statistics ==
| Club performance | | | League | | Cup | | League Cup | | Total | |
| Season | Club | League | Apps | Goals | Apps | Goals | Apps | Goals | Apps | Goals |
| Japan | | | League | | Emperor's Cup | | J.League Cup | | Total | |
|---|---|---|---|---|---|---|---|---|---|---|
| 1999 | Verdy Kawasaki | J1 League | 5 | 0 | 1 | 0 | 3 | 0 | 9 | 0 |
| Total | | | 5 | 0 | 1 | 0 | 3 | 0 | 9 | 0 |
