= J.League promotion/relegation series =

J. League test matches

In 2004, J. League introduced a series of two test matches called League Promotion/relegation Series (入れ替え戦, irekae sen) (J1/J2 play-offs) between the sixteenth-place J. Division 1 (J1) club and third-place J.league Division 2 (J2) club. The winner of this game receives the third and final ticket to J1 in the following season, with the first two going to the first- and second-place J2 teams at the end of the season.

== History ==
Prior to 2004, promotions and relegations involved the two bottom J1 clubs (15th place & 16th place) and two top J2 club (1st & 2nd places). At the end of the 2004 season, J1 expanded from 16 clubs to 18 clubs. Due to the expansion, the league promoted the top two teams in J2 to J1 without any relegations. The league also instituted a new playoff game that allowed the 3rd-place J2 club to challenge the 16th (and at the time, last- ) placed J1 club for a berth in J1 in the 2005 season. This was the start of this promotion/relegation Series. After the expansion, the league went back to their standard promotion and relegation system (17th & 18th in J1 switching places with 1st & 2nd in J2), but the promotion/relegation Series continued. The final series is the 2008 edition, as this is the final year J2 will have been composed of fewer than 18 teams. From 2009, direct promotion and relegation will be in place for three clubs of each division.

The irekae-sen concept is not new; it was a feature of the original Japan Soccer League, when, until 1980, it was usual that the bottom two team(s) in the First Division played off against the winner and runner-up of the All Japan Senior Football Championship and, after 1972, the Second Division's top two. After 1980 only the second-from-bottom team played against the Second Division runner-up.

In 2012 the irekae-sen concept was revived for the purpose of promotion and relegation between J2 and the Japan Football League, but it will be conditional on JFL clubs having J. League Associate Membership. Following the creation of the J3 League, the playouts remained until 2015 when promotion for the top two places was automated, conditional on clubs having J2 licences.

== Participating clubs ==
J2 clubs are only allowed to be promoted if they fulfill the J1 promotion criteria.

- Therefore, under usual circumstances, the 16th-placed J1 Club and the 3rd-placed J2 Club (both using standings at the end of the season) will play in the series.
- In the event that the 3rd J2 club does not meet other criteria for J1 promotion, no games are played.
- If either one of the J2 champion or runner-up does not meet the J1 promotion requirements, the series is between the 17th-placed J1 Club and the 3rd-placed J2 Club.
- Should both the J2 champion and runner-up fail to meet the requirements for promotion, the series involves the 18th-placed J1 club and the 3rd-placed J2 club.

In practice, given the more stringent rules for promotion from JFL to J2, these rules can be considered a mere formality.

== Competition format ==
- Two 90-minute games must be played. The first game is held in the home stadium of the J2 club, and the second game takes place in the home stadium of the J1 club.
- If club are tied in aggregate score, extra time and penalty kicks will take place.
- In case of extra time, the golden goal rule was used in 2004; however, since 2005 clubs must play out whole the extra time.
- Starting in 2006, the away goals rule has been in effect.

== Results ==
Year	J.League Division 1 16th-ranked	Score	J.League Division 2 3rd-ranked
2004	Kashiwa Reysol	2–0; 2–0; 4–0 agg.	Avispa Fukuoka
2005	Kashiwa Reysol	1–2; 2–6; 3–8 agg.	Ventforet Kofu
2006	Avispa Fukuoka	0–0; 1–1; 1–1 agg. (away: 0–1)	Vissel Kobe
2007	Sanfrecce Hiroshima	1–2; 0–0; 1–2 agg.	Kyoto Sanga
2008	Júbilo Iwata	1–1; 2–1; 3–2 agg.	Vegalta Sendai

== Details ==
=== 2004 ===
In the first year of this series, Kashiwa easily held their position in J1 by defeating Fukuoka in the series with aggregate score of 4–0.

December 4, 2004
13:03

Avispa Fukuoka	0–2	Kashiwa Reysol
	Official Report	Ono 47'; Yazawa 89'

Hakata no Mori, Fukuoka
Attendance: 20,522
Referee: Toshimitsu Yoshida

December 12, 2004
15:04

Kashiwa Reysol	2–0	Avispa Fukuoka
Unozawa 57'; Hato 61'	Official Report

Kashiwa Soccer Stadium, Kashiwa
Attendance: 13,149
Referee: Joji Kashihara

Kashiwa Reysol won 4–0 on aggregate and remained in J.League Division 1.
Avispa Fukuoka remained to J.League Division 2.

=== 2005 ===
In the years prior to 2005, Ventforet Kofu were facing extinction due to losing money running into hundreds of million yen. Having finished bottom of J2 for three consecutive seasons, in 2002 the club hired Kazuyuki Umino as the president who was able to turn the club around. The club started to make profit, attendance increased, and the club's performance improved each year. Finally, after defeating the J2 champions Kyoto Purple Sanga on the final matchday of 2005, they managed to finish in third place.

Kashiwa Reysol on the other hand, finished 16th and had to play this series for two consecutive seasons. Many believe Kashiwa underestimated this series as they easily defeated Avispa Fukuoka last year.

The irony was that on December 7, 1969, exactly 36 years before, Venforet Kofu's forerunner the Kofu Club, played and lost in promotion/relegation Series (JSL, at the time a single division, against the two finalists of the Shakaijin Cup; Kofu had been runner-up) against the Hitachi Club (Kashiwa Reysol's previous affiliation), who had finished 7th of 8 in the old league. Before the 2005 series, and excepting the 1973 season when as JSL Division 2 runners-up they lost another series at the hands of now-defunct Nippon Kokan, this had been the closest Kofu came to competing in the top division.

In the final minutes in the first leg, the Kose Sports Stadium blacked outed and the game was stopped. The lights came back after 20–30 minutes. In the second leg of this series, Bare had managed to score double-hat-trick (6 goals), which is a record for any J.League competitions until Michael Olunga scored 8 goals in a match on 24 November 2019 (2019 J2 League).

See 2005 J.League Division 1 for details.

December 7, 2005
19:04

Ventforet Kofu	2–1	Kashiwa Reysol
Kuranuki 25'; Baré 48'	Official Report	Reinaldo 11'

Kose Sports Stadium, Kofu
Attendance: 12,372
Referee: Joji Kashihara

December 10, 2005
15:04

Kashiwa Reysol	2–6	Ventforet Kofu
Reinaldo 52'; Unozawa 86'	Official Report	Baré 10', 27', 53', 68', 69', 87'

Kashiwa Soccer Stadium, Kashiwa
Attendance: 12,013
Referee: Masayoshi Okada

Ventforet Kofu won 8–3 on aggregate and promoted to J.League Division 1.
Kashiwa Reysol relegated to J.League Division 2.

=== 2006 ===
From matchday 28 it was clear that the relegation battle was limited to three clubs; Kyoto Purple Sanga, Cerezo Osaka, and Avispa Fukuoka. All other clubs officially passed the relegation line by matchday 32. Kyoto were relegated on the penultimate week of the season. Gpoing into the final week, Cerezo Osaka (16th) were one point head of Fukuoka (17th). Osaka lost as Fukuoka drew, meaning they finished level on points. However, Avispa clinched the 16th place on account of their superior goal difference of -24 as opposed to Cerezo's of -26.

The same situation was occurring in the J2 promotion race, with three clubs, Yokohama F.C., Kashiwa Reysol, and Vissel Kobe way ahead of other clubs, but only two automatic promotion sports available. In the penultimate week of the season, Yokohama clinched the championship and promotion. Heading into the final matchday, Kobe sat in 2nd, one point ahead of Kashiwa, and it appeared that Kashiwa would have to settle for the playoff series for the third year running. However, on the final day of the season, Kashiwa won and clinched the runners-up spot after Kobe fell down to third place by losing the last match.

The Series finished 1–1 on aggregate following a 0–0 draw in the first leg but Kobe won on the away goals rule and replaced Fukuoka in the first division.

See 2006 J.League Division 1 for details.

December 6, 2006
19:02

Vissel Kobe	0–0	Avispa Fukuoka
	Official Report

Kobe Wing Stadium, Kobe
Attendance: 12,009
Referee: Joji Kashihara

December 9, 2006
16:04

Avispa Fukuoka	1–1	Vissel Kobe
Nunobe 84'	Official Report	Kondo 60'

Hakata no Mori, Fukuoka
Attendance: 13,102
Referee: Yuichi Nishimura

1–1 on aggregate. Vissel Kobe won on away goals and promoted to J.League Division 1.
Avispa Fukuoka relegated to J.League Division 2.

=== 2007 ===
In 2007, Kyoto Sanga FC defeated Sanfrecce Hiroshima 2–1 on aggregate to clinch a spot in J1 for the 2008 season. Hiroshima are relegated to J2 for the first since 2003.

See 2007 J.League Division 1 for details.

December 5, 2007
19:04

Kyoto Sanga	2–1	Sanfrecce Hiroshima
Tahara 28', 39'	Report	Hirashige 88'

Nishikyogoku Athletic Stadium, Kyoto
Attendance: 12,637
Referee: Masayoshi Okada

December 8, 2007
16:04

Sanfrecce Hiroshima	0–0	Kyoto Sanga
	Report

Hiroshima Big Arch, Hiroshima
Attendance: 23,162
Referee: Yuichi Nishimura

Kyoto Sanga won 2–1 on aggregate and promoted to J.League Division 1.
Sanfrecce Hiroshima relegated to J.League Division 2.

=== 2008 ===
The last promotion/relegation series for the time to come featured, as in the first edition, the higher division club saving its position in J1. This was the first time since 1980 that Júbilo Iwata (then known as Yamaha Motors) had to battle to keep its position in the top division; in 1980 they had defeated Fujitsu, the forerunner to Kawasaki Frontale.

See 2008 J.League Division 1 for details.

December 10, 2008
19:00

Vegalta Sendai	1–1	Júbilo Iwata
Nadson 41'	Report	Takuya Matsuura 53'

Yurtec Stadium Sendai, Sendai
Attendance: 18,974
Referee: Kenji Ogiya

December 13, 2008
16:00

Júbilo Iwata	2–1	Vegalta Sendai
Takuya Matsuura 41', 70'	Report	Ryang Yong-gi 89'

Yamaha Stadium, Iwata
Attendance: 16,693
Referee: Masayoshi Okada

Júbilo Iwata won 3–2 on aggregate and remained in J.League Division 1.
Vegalta Sendai remained in J.League Division 2.
