= Jaílton (footballer, born 1982) =

Brazilian footballer

Personal information
- Full name: Paulo Jaílton da Cruz Alves
- Date of birth: April 19, 1982 (age 44)
- Place of birth: Aracaju, Brazil
- Height: 1.78 m (5 ft 10 in)
- Positions: Defensive midfielder; central defender

Team information
- Current team: Fortaleza

Youth career
- 2002: Sergipe

Senior career*
Years	Team	Apps	(Gls)
2003	América-MG	6	(0)
2003	Tupi		
2004	Ipatinga		
2004	Vitória Guimarães		
2004–2005	Estrela Amadora		
2006–2011	Ipatinga		
2007–2008	→ Flamengo (loan)	57	(2)
2009	→ Fluminense (loan)	0	(0)
2009	→ Coritiba (loan)	33	(1)
2012	Tupi		
2012	Itabaiana	6	(1)
2013	Nacional-MG		
2013–	Fortaleza	1	(0)
- * Club domestic league appearances and goals

Jaílton da Cruz Alves (born April 19, 1982), or simply Jaílton, is a Brazilian professional footballer who plays as a defensive midfielder for Fortaleza.

== Career ==
Jaílton was born in Aracaju. On 14 May 2009, he was released by Fluminense upon his own request, he has been unable to play due to recurrent injuries throughout this season. Jailton was a free agent and on 15 May 2009 Coritiba signed him on a free transfer. (in Portuguese)

== Career statistics ==
(Correct as of December 7, 2008)

Club	Season	Carioca League			Brazilian Série A			Brazilian Cup			Copa Libertadores			Total		
Club	Season	Apps	Goals	Assists	Apps	Goals	Assists	Apps	Goals	Assists	Apps	Goals	Assists	Apps	Goals	Assists
Flamengo	2007	8	0	0	24	1	0	-	-	-	3	0	0	35	1	0
Flamengo	2008	14	0	1	33	1	2	-	-	-	6	0	0	53	1	3
Total		22	0	1	57	2	2	-	-	-	9	0	0	88	2	3

according to combined sources on the and. (in Portuguese)
