= Luiz Alberto (footballer, born 1982) =

Brazilian footballer

Personal information
- Full name: Luiz Alberto Leite Sousa
- Date of birth: 2 November 1982 (age 44)
- Place of birth: São Paulo, Brazil
- Height: 1.81 m (5 ft 11 1/2 in)
- Position: Centre back

Team information
- Current team: Maria da Fonte
- Number: 22

Youth career
- 2003–2004: Cataduvense
- 2004–2005: Osasco

Senior career*
Years	Team	Apps	(Gls)
2005–2006	Carregosense	0	(0)
2006–2008	Ribeirão	42	(1)
2008–2011	Estoril	50	(0)
2011	Belenenses	14	(0)
2011–2012	Chaves	19	(0)
2012–2014	Trofense	72	(3)
2014–2016	Famalicão	48	(2)
2016–2017	Merelinense	27	(1)
2017	Freamunde	13	(3)
2017–2018	Trofense	10	(1)
2018–2019	Merelinense	20	(1)
2019–	Maria da Fonte	25	(1)
- * Club domestic league appearances and goals as of 14 March 2018

Luiz Alberto Leite Sousa (born 2 November 1982), commonly known as Luiz Alberto, is a Brazilian footballer who plays as a defender for Maria da Fonte.

== Club career ==
In the 2014–15 season he helped the Vila Nova de Famalicão side in achieving the promotion to the Segunda Liga.

== Honours ==
=== Club ===
Famalicão

- Campeonato Nacional de Seniores: Runner-up 2014–15
