= Luiz Alberto (footballer, born 1977) =

Brazilian footballer

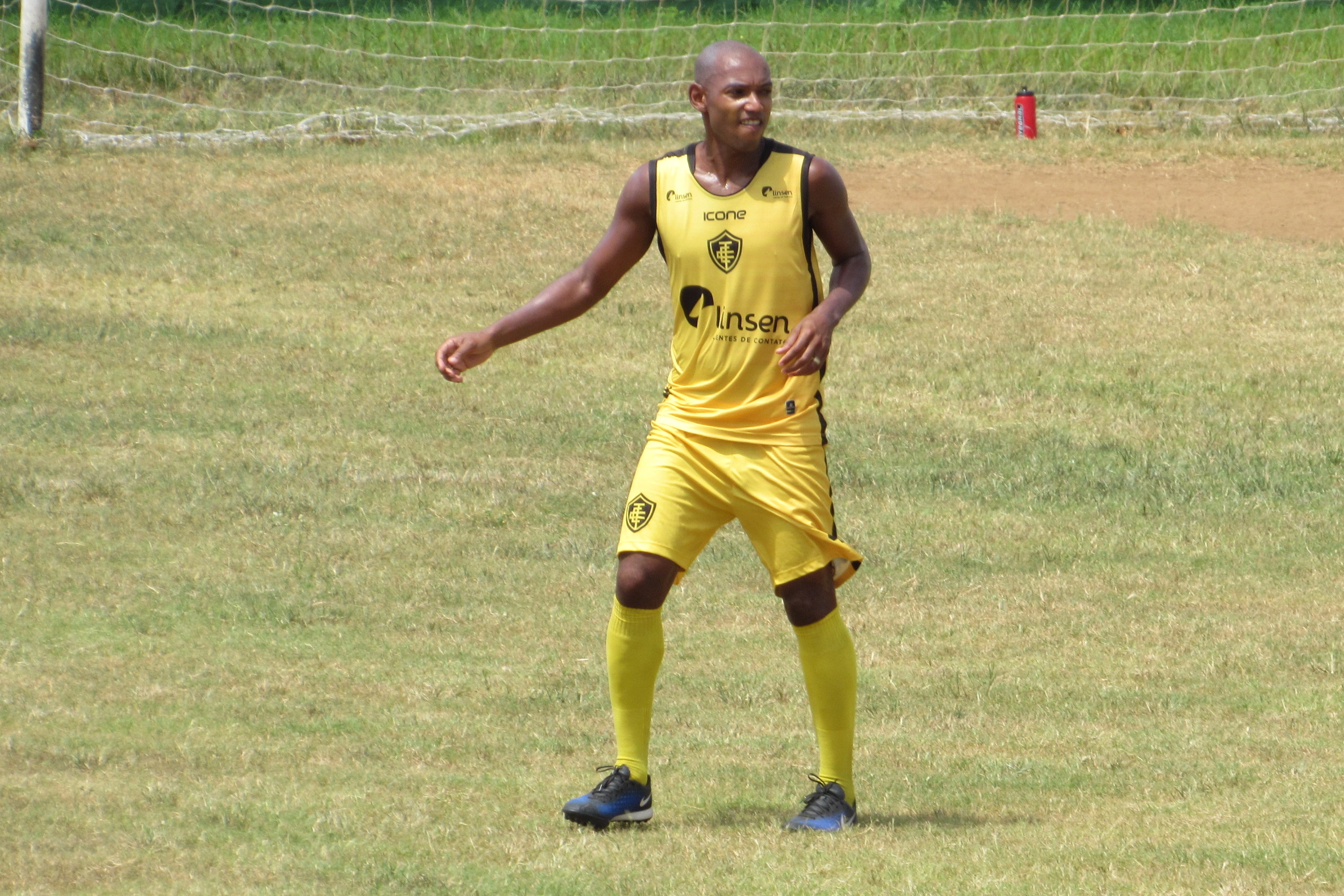
- Luiz Alberto, 2017

Personal information
- Full name: Luiz Alberto da Silva Oliveira
- Date of birth: 1 December 1977 (age 48)
- Place of birth: Rio de Janeiro, Brazil
- Height: 1.86 m (6 ft 1 in)
- Position: Centre back

Youth career
- 1993–1996: Flamengo

Senior career*
| Years | Team | Apps | (Gls) |
| 1993–1999 | Flamengo | 56 | (2) |
| 2000–2001 | Saint-Étienne | 10 | (0) |
| 2001–2005 | Real Sociedad | 75 | (6) |
| 2002 | → Internacional (loan) | 20 | (3) |
| 2003 | → Atlético Mineiro (loan) | 39 | (3) |
| 2005–2006 | Santos | 47 | (5) |
| 2007–2009 | Fluminense | 81 | (3) |
| 2010 | Boca Juniors | 7 | (0) |
| 2011 | Duque de Caxias | 0 | (4) |
| 2012 | Boavista | 11 | (2) |
| 2012–2014 | Atlético Paranaense | 44 | (2) |
| 2014–2015 | Náutico | 7 | (0) |
| 2015–2016 | São Gonçalo EC | | |
| 2016– | Boavista | 6 | (0) |

International career
| 1999 | Brazil | 1 | (0) |
| 2000 | Brazil U-23 | 1 | (0) |
- * Club domestic league appearances and goals as of 3 October 2016

Luiz Alberto da Silva Oliveira (born 1 December 1977 in Rio de Janeiro), more commonly Luiz Alberto, is a Brazilian former football defender who last played for Boavista.

== Career ==
Luiz Alberto was 16 years old when he first played for Flamengo but it was only in 1997 when he clinched a place in the club's first eleven. He played alongside the likes of Júnior Baiano and Juan in a partnership that led the club to Campeonato Carioca and Copa Mercosur titles in 1999. In 2000, however, he lost his place in the starting eleven for new signing Carlos Gamarra and was transferred to Saint-Étienne.

After one season with the French team, he moved to Real Sociedad in Spain, where he played first between 2001 and 2002 and also from 2004 to 2005. Between his stints at Spanish club, Luiz Alberto also played for Internacional and Atlético Mineiro.

Luiz Alberto came back to Brazil in 2005 after signing for Santos, later returning to Rio de Janeiro in 2007 to play for Fluminense in where he has won 2007 Copa do Brasil and finished runner-up at 2008 Copa Libertadores after losing the final to LDU Quito on penalties.

In 2010, after leaving Fluminense, Luiz Alberto joined Argentine club Boca Juniors. On 20 April 2010 Boca Juniors released the Brazilian central defender by mutual consent.

== International career ==
Alberto has had one international appearance for Brazil under Vanderlei Luxemburgo in a 1999 FIFA Confederations Cup match against New Zealand on 30 July 1999.

== Honours ==
=== Club ===
Flamengo

- Gold Cup: 1996
- Rio de Janeiro State League: 1996, 1999, 2001
- Brazilian World Champions Championship: 1997
- Mercosur Cup: 1999
- Guanabara Cup: 1999

Santos

- São Paulo State League: 2006

Fluminense

- Brazilian Cup: 2007
