= J1 League =

Association football league in Japan

Meiji Yasuda J1 League
- Organising body: Japan Professional Football League (J. League)
- Founded: 1992; 34 years ago
- Country: Japan
- Confederation: AFC
- Number of clubs: 20
- Level on pyramid: 1
- Relegation to: J2 League
- Domestic cup(s): Emperor's Cup; Japanese Super Cup
- League cup: J.League Cup
- International cup(s): AFC Champions League Elite; AFC Champions League Two
- Current champions: Kashima Antlers (9th title) (2025)
- Most championships: Kashima Antlers (9 titles)
- Most appearances: Yasuhito Endō (672)
- Top scorer: Yoshito Ōkubo (191)
- Broadcasters: DAZN (including Abema de DAZN); NHK General TV (selected matches); NHK BS (selected matches); YouTube (selected matches and markets)
- Website: jleague.jp
- Current: 2026–27 J1 League

The J1 League (J1リーグ), officially known as Meiji Yasuda J1 League (明治安田J1リーグ) for sponsorship reasons, is a professional association football league in Japan and the highest level of the Japanese football league system. Contested by 20 clubs, it operates on a system of promotion and relegation with the J2 League. Both the J1 and J2 leagues are operated by the Japan Professional Football League.

Founded in 1992, it is one of the most successful leagues in Asian professional club football history. It was known as the J.League from 1993 to 1998 before becoming a two-division league, and as J.League Division 1 from 1999 to 2014. The current champions are Kashima Antlers, who won a record-extending ninth J.League title and a record-breaking ninth top flight title in the 2025 season.

== History ==
=== Before the professional league (pre-1993) ===
Before the inception of the J.League, the highest level of club football was the Japan Soccer League (JSL), which was formed in 1965 and consisted of amateur clubs. Despite being well-attended during the boom of the late 1960s and early 1970s (when Japan's national team won the bronze Olympic medal at the 1968 games in Mexico), the JSL went into decline in the 1980s, in general line with the deteriorating situation worldwide. Fans were few, the grounds were not of the highest quality, and the Japanese national team was not on a par with the Asian powerhouses. To raise the level of play domestically, to attempt to garner more fans, and to strengthen the national team, the Japan Football Association (JFA) decided to form a professional league.

The professional association football league, J.League was formed in 1992, with eight clubs drawn from the JSL First Division, one from the Second Division, and the newly formed Shimizu S-Pulse. At the same time, JSL changed its name and became the now-defunct Japan Football League, a semi-professional league. Although the J.League did not officially launch until 1993, the J.League Cup was held between the ten clubs in 1992 to prepare for the inaugural season.

=== Inaugural season and J.League boom (1993–1995) ===
J.League officially kicked off its first season with ten clubs in early 1993.

=== After the boom (1996–1999) ===
Despite its success in the first three years, in early 1996, the league attendance declined rapidly. In 1997, the average attendance was 10,131, compared to more than 19,000 in 1994. Notably, Arsène Wenger managed Nagoya Grampus Eight during this period.

=== Change of infrastructure and game formats (1999–2004) ===
The league's management announced the J.League Hundred Year Vision, in which they aimed to create or endorse 100 professional association football clubs throughout Japan by 2092, which would mark the hundredth season since the establishment of the J1 League. The league also encouraged the clubs to promote football or non-football related sports and health activities, to acquire local sponsorships, and to build good relationships with their hometowns at the grassroots level. The league administration believed that this would allow the clubs to bond with their respective cities and towns, and obtain support from local government, companies, and citizens. In other words, clubs will be able to rely on the locals, rather than major national sponsors.

The format of the league was heavily changed in 1999. The league acquired nine clubs from the semi-professional JFL and one club from the J.League to create a two-division system. The top flight became the J.League Division 1 (J1) with 16 clubs while the J.League Division 2 (J2) was launched with ten clubs in 1999. The former second-tier Japan Football League now became the third-tier Japan Football League (J3).

Also, until 2004 (with the exception of 1996 season), the J1 season was divided into two stages. At the end of each full season, the champions from each half played a two-legged series to determine the overall season winners and runners-up. Júbilo Iwata in 2002, and Yokohama F. Marinos in 2003, won both "halves" of the respective seasons, thus eliminating the need for the playoff series. The league abolished the split-season system in 2005.

=== European league format and AFC Champions League (2005–2008) ===
For the 2005 season, the J1 League was increased to 18 clubs and the season format adopted a system similar to European club football. The number of relegated clubs also increased from 2 to 2.5, with the 3rd-to-last club going into a promotion/relegation playoff with the third-placed J2 club.

Three Japanese sides made the quarter-finals in the 2008 ACL.

The league and the clubs increasingly paid more attention to Asian competitions. For example, Kawasaki Frontale built up a notable fan base in Hong Kong, owing to their participation in the Asian Champions League during the 2007 season. There was success for Urawa Red Diamonds in 2007 and Gamba Osaka in 2008. The J.League obtained the highest league ranking and a total of four competition slots, starting from the 2009 season. This included the previous Emperor's Cup Winner. The league took this as an opportunity to sell TV broadcasting rights to foreign countries, especially in Asia.

Other changes affecting the competition from the 2009 season included increasing the number of relegation slots to three, introducing a dedicated AFC Player slot (reserved for a player that derives from an AFC country other than Japan) as one of the four allowable foreign players. From 2012, having the J.League Club Licence became a requirement of being a member of the Asian Football Confederation, and one of the criteria of whether a club was permitted to be promoted to a higher tier in professional level leagues.

In 2015, the J.League Division 1 was renamed J1 League. The tournament format was changed to a three-stage system. The season was split into first and second stages, followed by a third and final championship stage. The third stage was composed of three to five teams. The team with the most points in each stage and the top three team with the most points overall qualified. If both of the stage winners finished in the top three teams for the season, then only three teams qualified for the championship stage. These teams then took part in a championship playoff stage to decide the winner of the league trophy.

=== Current (2017–2025) ===
Despite the new multi-stage format being initially reported as locked in for five seasons, due to negative reaction from hardcore fans and failure to appeal to casual fans, after 2016 it was abandoned in favour of a return to a single-stage system. From 2017, the team which accumulates the most points will be named champion, with no championship stage taking place at the season's end, and from 2018, the bottom two clubs are relegated and the 16th-placed club enters a playoff with the J2 club that wins a promotion playoff series. If the J2 playoff winner prevails, the club is promoted, with the J1 club being relegated, otherwise the J1 club can retain its position in J1 League with the promotion failure of the J2 club.

In November 2017, Urawa Red Diamonds played the AFC Champions League final against Al Hilal. After a draw in the first leg, Urawa Red Diamonds won the second leg 1-0 and were crowned Asian Champions. In the past 10–15 years, Japanese clubs have risen also intercontinentally. Clubs Gamba Osaka and Urawa Red Diamonds have been crowned Asian champions and participated in the Club World Cup, always targeting at least the semi-finals. Kashima Antlers were finalists of the 2016 edition and eventually lost to Real Madrid.

=== Future (2026–27 season onwards) ===
The J-League will transition to a season that follows the European football calendar, to be played from August to May. This will include a winter break between December and February.

As a part of the transition, the league will have a one-off special tournament (called the 2026 J1 100 Year Vision League) to be held during the first half of 2026.

=== Timeline ===
Year	Important events	No. J clubs	No. ACL Elite clubs	No. ACL Two clubs	Rel. slots
1989	JFA forms a professional league assessment committee.			–	
1990	The committee decides the criteria for professional clubs; Fifteen to twenty clubs from Japan Soccer League applies for the professional league membership			–	
1992	The professional league, J.League is formed with the following 10 clubs: Gamba Osaka, JEF United Ichihara, Nagoya Grampus Eight, Sanfrecce Hiroshima, Urawa Red Diamonds, Verdy Kawasaki, Yokohama Flügels, and Yokohama Marinos (pre-existing from the old JSL First Division); Kashima Antlers (promoted from the old Second Division); Shimizu S-Pulse (newly formed, non-company club).; Japan Soccer League becomes then second-tier Japan Football League; J.League hosts the first domestic league cup competition with the ten clubs			–	
1993	The J.League officially kicks off its first season	10		–	
1994	Following clubs are promoted from Japan Football League: Júbilo Iwata and Bellmare Hiratsuka	12		–	
1995	Following clubs are promoted from Japan Football League: Cerezo Osaka and Kashiwa Reysol; The points system is introduced for the first time: a club receives 3 pts for any win, 1 pt for PK loss, and 0 pts for regulation or extra time loss.	14		–	
1996	Following clubs are promoted from Japan Football League: Kyoto Purple Sanga and Avispa Fukuoka; The league adopts single season format; J.League average attendance hits the record low 10,131	16		–	
1997	Following club is promoted from Japan Football League: Vissel Kobe; The league goes back to split-season format; The points system changes: a club receives 3 pts for a regulation win, 2 pts for extra-time win, 1 pt for PK win, and 0 pts for any loss.	17		–	
1998	Following club is promoted from Japan Football League: Consadole Sapporo; Yokohama Flügels announce that they will be dissolved into crosstown rivals Yokohama Marinos for the 1999 season; The league announces the J.League Hundred Year Vision; The league announces incorporation of two-division system for the 1999 season; The league hosts J.League Promotion Tournament to decide to promote and/or relegate clubs. As a result, Consadole Sapporo becomes the first club be to relegated.	18		–	
1999	Yokohama Marinos merge with Yokohama Flügels to become Yokohama F. Marinos; Penalty kick shootouts are abolished in both divisions; however, golden goal extra-time rules stayed; The points system changes: a club receives 3 pts for a regulation win, 2 pts for an extra time win, and 1 pt for a tie; Japan Football League (former) is also restructured, as it becomes the 3rd-tier Japan Football League.; Note: To distinguish between the former and the current JFL, the new JFL is pronounced Nihon Football League in Japanese.	16		–	2
2000		16		–	2
2001		16		–	2
2002		16	2	–	2
2003	Extra time is abolished in Division 1 and traditional 3–1–0 points system is adopted	16	2	–	2
2004	No automatic relegation this season, as the top flight expands to 18 clubs for the following season; Inception of the two-legged Promotion/relegation Series	16	2	–	0.5
2005	J.League Division 1 expands to 18 clubs; J.League Division 1 adopts single-season format	18	2	–	2.5
2006	Away goals rule is adopted in Yamazaki Nabisco Cup and Promotion/relegation Series; The league forms J.League expansion committee; The league reintroduces J.League Associate Membership	18	2	–	2.5
2007	J.League champion qualifies to the FIFA Club World Cup as the host for next two seasons.; Note: If a Japanese club wins the AFC Champions League, the host loses its right.: Urawa Red Diamonds wins the 2007 AFC Champions League, becoming the first Japanese club to win the AFC Champions League since its rebranding in 2002. Urawa wins the bronze medal at the 2007 FIFA Club World Cup, becoming the first Japanese club to do so.	18	2	–	2.5
2008	Gamba Osaka wins the 2008 AFC Champions League, the second straight championship by a Japanese club and wins the bronze medal at the 2008 FIFA Club World Cup, the second straight Japanese bronze medal at the competition.	18	2+1	–	2.5
2009	Four clubs enter AFC Champions League.; Implementation of a 4th foreign player slot, a.k.a. AFC player slot; Promotion/relegation Series is eliminated and 16th-place club is now relegated by default.	18	4	–	3
2010		18	4	–	3
2011	J.League champion qualifies to the FIFA Club World Cup as the host for next two seasons again.	18	4	–	3
2012		18	4	–	3
2013		18	4	–	3
2014		18	4	–	3
2015	J.League reinstates split-season format for the next five seasons.; J.League champion qualifies to the FIFA Club World Cup as the host for the next two seasons again.	18	4	–	3
2016	J.League champion qualifies to the FIFA Club World Cup as the host.; Kashima Antlers reaches the 2016 FIFA Club World Cup Final becoming the first Asian club and only Japanese club to reach the Final, finishing with the silver medal.	18	4	–	3
2017	J.League reinstates single-season format after only two seasons.; Urawa Red Diamonds wins the 2017 AFC Champions League becoming the first Japanese club to win this competition twice.; Players from J.League partner nations (Thailand, Vietnam, Myanmar, Cambodia, Singapore, Indonesia, Iran, Malaysia, and Qatar) are not counted as foreigners.	18	4	–	3
2018	J.League implements entry playoff between 16th J1 club and J2 playoffs winner.; Kashima Antlers wins the 2018 AFC Champions League becoming only the third Japanese club to win this competition. Kashima goes on to finish 4th at 2018 FIFA Club World Cup, the best performance by a Japanese club in a FIFA World Cup held overseas outside of Japanese soil.	18	4	–	2.5
2019	J.League implements a new foreigners rule. J1, J2 and J3 clubs can recruit as many foreign players as they desire, but only 5 (J1) or 4 (J2 and J3) can be in the matchday squad. The "Asian slot" is removed.	18	4	–	2.5
2020	No relegation due to the COVID-19 pandemic	18	3	–	0
2021	League is expanded to hold 20 clubs, as no team was relegated from the J1 and two teams were promoted from the J2	20	3	–	4
2022	League returns to have 18 clubs, as there were four relegated teams from J1 and two promoted to J2.	18	3	–	2.5
2023	It is decided that from the 2024 season, the J1, J2 and J3 Leagues will be levelled to 20 clubs in each, with promotions and relegations of the 2023 season of each league being adjusted accordingly for it to be possible.; As league will be expanded to permanently hold 20 clubs, only one team will be directly relegated to the J2 for 2023.; There will be promotion play-offs for the J1 with teams from 3rd to 6th place, with no team from the J1 participating on it.	18	3	–	1
2024	No J1-J2 promotion/relegation play-offs will be held and instead, the three worst-placed teams will be directly relegated to the J2.	20	2	1	3
2025	This is the last season of the spring-autumn format.	20	2	1	3
2026–27	This is first season to use fall-spring format, starting from August 2026 until May 2027.	20	2	1	3

== Past logos ==
Logo used between 1999 and 2014

Logo used between 2015 and 2018

Logo used between 2019 and 2025

== 2026–27 season ==
=== League format ===
Twenty clubs play in double round-robin (home and away) format, a total of 38 games each. A club receives 3 points for a win, 1 point for a tie, and 0 points for a loss. The clubs are ranked by points, and tiebreakers are, in the following order:

- Goal differential
- Goals scored
- Head-to-head results
- Disciplinary points

A draw would be conducted, if necessary. However, if two clubs are tied for first place, both clubs will be declared as co-champions. The top two clubs will qualify to the following season's AFC Champions League Elite, the third-placers qualify to the following season's AFC Champions League Two, while the bottom three clubs will be relegated to J2.

Prize money (2020 figures)

- Champions: 300,000,000 yen
- Second place: 120,000,000 yen
- Third place: 60,000,000 yen

In addition to the prize, the top 4 clubs are awarded with the following funds.

J league funds distributed to top 4 clubs (from 2017)

- Champions: 1,550,000,000 yen
- Second place: 700,000,000 yen
- Third place: 350,000,000 yen
- Fourth place: 180,000,000 yen

=== Participating clubs ===
Club	Year joined	Seasons in J1	Based in	First season in top flight	Seasons in top flight	Current spell in top flight	Last title
Avispa Fukuoka	1996	14	Fukuoka	1996	14	since 2021	–
Cerezo Osaka	1995	25	Osaka	1965	51	since 2017	1980
Fagiano Okayama	2009 (J2)	1	Okayama	2025	1	since 2025	–
Gamba Osaka	1993	32	Osaka	1986–87	38	since 2014	2014
JEF United Chiba	1993	17	Chiba	1965	44	Since 2026	–
Kashima Antlers	1993	33	Kashima, Ibaraki	1985–86	36	since 1993	2016
Kashiwa Reysol	1995	28	Kashiwa, Chiba	1965	52	since 2020	2011
Kawasaki Frontale	1999 (J2)	22	Kawasaki, Kanagawa	1977	24	since 2005	2021
Kyoto Sanga	1996	15	Kyoto	1996	15	since 2022	–
FC Machida Zelvia	2012 (J2)	2	Machida, Tokyo	2024	2	since 2024	–
Mito HollyHock	2000 (J2)	0	Mito & Ibaraki	2026	0	Since 2026	–
Nagoya Grampus	1993	32	Nagoya	1973	40	since 2018	2010
Sanfrecce Hiroshima	1993	31	Hiroshima, Hiroshima	1965	53	since 2009	2015
Shimizu S-Pulse	1993	30	Shimizu, Shizuoka	1993	30	since 2025	–
FC Tokyo	1999 (J2)	25	Tokyo	2000	25	since 2012	–
Tokyo Verdy	1993	16	Tokyo	1978	30	since 2024	1994
Urawa Red Diamonds	1993	32	Saitama	1965	58	since 2001	2006
V-Varen Nagasaki	2013 (J2)	1	Nagasaki & Nagasaki	2018	1	Since 2026	–
Vissel Kobe	1997	27	Kobe, Hyōgo	1997	27	since 2014	2024
Yokohama F. Marinos	1993	33	Yokohama, Yokosuka & Yamato	1979	45	since 1982	2022

Source for teams participating:

- Pink background denotes club was most recently promoted from J2 League.
- "Year joined" is the year the club joined the J.League (Division 1 unless otherwise indicated).
- "First season in top flight", "Seasons in top flight", "Current spell in top flight", and "Last title" include seasons in the old Japan Soccer League First Division.

=== Stadiums (2026–27) ===
Primary venues used in the J1 League:

Yokohama F. Marinos	Urawa Red Diamonds	FC Tokyo	Tokyo Verdy	Nagoya Grampus
Nissan Stadium	Saitama Stadium 2002	Ajinomoto Stadium		Toyota Stadium
Capacity: 71,624	Capacity: 62,040	Capacity: 47,851		Capacity: 42,753
Gamba Osaka	Kashima Antlers	Sanfrecce Hiroshima	Vissel Kobe	Kawasaki Frontale
Panasonic Stadium Suita	Mercari Stadium	Edion Peace Wing Hiroshima	NOEVIR Stadium Kobe	Uvance Todoroki Stadium by Fujitsu
Capacity: 39,694	Capacity: 39,095	Capacity: 28,407	Capacity: 27,974	Capacity: 26,827
Cerezo Osaka	Avispa Fukuoka	Kyoto Sanga	V-Varen Nagasaki	Shimizu S-Pulse
Yodoko Sakura Stadium	Best Denki Stadium	Sanga Stadium by Kyocera	PEACE STADIUM Connected by SoftBank	IAI Stadium Nihondaira
Capacity: 24,481	Capacity: 21,546	Capacity: 21,269	Capacity: 20,268	Capacity: 19,594
JEF United Chiba	Fagiano Okayama	Machida Zelvia	Kashiwa Reysol	Mito HollyHock
Fukuda Denshi Arena	JFE Harenokuni Stadium	Machida GION Stadium	SANKYO FRONTIER Kashiwa Stadium	K's Denki Stadium
Capacity: 19,470	Capacity: 15,479	Capacity: 15,320	Capacity: 15,109	Capacity: 10,152

=== Former clubs ===
Club	Year Joined	Seasons in J1	Based in	First season in top flight	Seasons in top flight	Last spell in top flight	Last title	Current league
Albirex Niigata	1999 (J2)	16	Niigata	2004	16	2023–2025	–	J2
Hokkaido Consadole Sapporo	1998	12	Sapporo	1989/90	16	2017–2024	–	J2
Júbilo Iwata	1994	25	Iwata, Shizuoka	1980	37	2024	2002	J2
Matsumoto Yamaga	2012 (J2)	2	Matsumoto, Nagano	2015	2	2019	–	J3
Montedio Yamagata	1999 (J2)	4	Tendo, Yamagata	2009	4	2015	–	J2
Oita Trinita	1999 (J2)	11	Ōita	2003	11	2019–2021	–	J2
Omiya Ardija	1999 (J2)	12	Saitama	2005	12	2016–2017	–	J2
Sagan Tosu	1999 (J2)	4	Tosu, Saga	2012	13	2012–2024	–	J2
Shonan Bellmare	1994	18	Hiratsuka, Kanagawa	1972	36	2018–2025	–	J2
Tokushima Vortis	2005 (J2)	2	Tokushima	2014	2	2021	–	J2
Vegalta Sendai	1999 (J2)	14	Sendai, Miyagi	2002	14	2010–2021	–	J2
Ventforet Kofu	1999 (J2)	8	Kōfu, Yamanashi	2006	8	2013–2017	–	J2
Yokohama FC	2001 (J2)	5	Yokohama, Kanagawa	2007	5	2025	–	J2
Yokohama Flügels	1993	6	Yokohama, Kanagawa	1985/86	11	1988/89–1998	–	Defunct

- Grey background denotes club was most recently relegated to J2 League.
- "Year joined" is the year the club joined the J.League (Division 1 unless otherwise indicated).
- "First season in top flight", "Seasons in top flight", "Last spell in top flight", and "Last title" includes seasons in the old Japan Soccer League First Division.

== Champions ==
#	Season	Champions	Runners-up
1	1993	Verdy Kawasaki	Kashima Antlers
2	1994	Verdy Kawasaki (2)	Sanfrecce Hiroshima
3	1995	Yokohama Marinos	Verdy Kawasaki
4	1996	Kashima Antlers	Nagoya Grampus Eight
5	1997	Júbilo Iwata	Kashima Antlers
6	1998	Kashima Antlers (2)	Júbilo Iwata
7	1999	Júbilo Iwata (2)	Shimizu S-Pulse
8	2000	Kashima Antlers (3)	Yokohama F. Marinos
9	2001	Kashima Antlers (4)	Júbilo Iwata
10	2002	Júbilo Iwata (3)	Yokohama F. Marinos
11	2003	Yokohama F. Marinos (2)	Júbilo Iwata
12	2004	Yokohama F. Marinos (3)	Urawa Red Diamonds
13	2005	Gamba Osaka	Urawa Red Diamonds
14	2006	Urawa Red Diamonds	Kawasaki Frontale
15	2007	Kashima Antlers (5)	Urawa Red Diamonds
16	2008	Kashima Antlers (6)	Kawasaki Frontale
17	2009	Kashima Antlers (7)	Kawasaki Frontale
18	2010	Nagoya Grampus	Gamba Osaka
19	2011	Kashiwa Reysol	Nagoya Grampus
20	2012	Sanfrecce Hiroshima	Vegalta Sendai
21	2013	Sanfrecce Hiroshima (2)	Yokohama F. Marinos
22	2014	Gamba Osaka (2)	Urawa Red Diamonds
23	2015	Sanfrecce Hiroshima (3)	Gamba Osaka
24	2016	Kashima Antlers (8)	Urawa Red Diamonds
25	2017	Kawasaki Frontale	Kashima Antlers
26	2018	Kawasaki Frontale (2)	Sanfrecce Hiroshima
27	2019	Yokohama F. Marinos (4)	FC Tokyo
28	2020	Kawasaki Frontale (3)	Gamba Osaka
29	2021	Kawasaki Frontale (4)	Yokohama F. Marinos
30	2022	Yokohama F. Marinos (5)	Kawasaki Frontale
31	2023	Vissel Kobe	Yokohama F. Marinos
32	2024	Vissel Kobe (2)	Sanfrecce Hiroshima
33	2025	Kashima Antlers (9)	Kashiwa Reysol

=== Performances by club ===
Clubs in bold compete in the current season.

Club	Champions	Runners-up	Winning seasons	Runners-up seasons
**Kashima Antlers**	9	3	1996, 1998, 2000, 2001, 2007, 2008, 2009, 2016, 2025	1993, 1997, 2017
**Yokohama F. Marinos**	5	5	1995, 2003, 2004, 2019, 2022	2000, 2002, 2013, 2021, 2023
**Kawasaki Frontale**	4	4	2017, 2018, 2020, 2021	2006, 2008, 2009, 2022
Júbilo Iwata	3	3	1997, 1999, 2002	1998, 2001, 2003
**Sanfrecce Hiroshima**	3	3	2012, 2013, 2015	1994, 2018, 2024
**Gamba Osaka**	2	3	2005, 2014	2010, 2015, 2020
**Tokyo Verdy**	2	1	1993, 1994	1995
**Vissel Kobe**	2	0	2023, 2024	
**Urawa Red Diamonds**	1	5	2006	2004, 2005, 2007, 2014, 2016
**Nagoya Grampus**	1	2	2010	1996, 2011
**Kashiwa Reysol**	1	1	2011	2025
**Shimizu S-Pulse**	0	1		1999
Vegalta Sendai	0	1		2012
**FC Tokyo**	0	1		2019

== Statistics ==
=== All-time J1 League table ===
The all-time J1 League table is a cumulative record of all match results, points, and goals of every team that has played in the J1 League. The table that follows is accurate as of the end of the 2022 season. Teams in bold are part of the 2023 J1 League.

Note: For statistical purposes, the traditional 3–1–0 points system is used for all matches. As in the season, 1993–1994 did not use the point system. In seasons 1995–1996, were using 3 pts for any win, 1 pt for PK loss, and 0 pts for regulation or extra time loss. In seasons 1997–1998, were using 3 pts for a regulation win, 2 pts for extra-time win, 1 pt for PK win, and 0 pts for any loss. And from seasons 1999–2002, were using 3 pts for a regulation win, 2 pts for an extra time win, and 1 pt for a tie.

Pos.	Club	Seasons	Pld	W	D	L	GF	GA	GD	Pts	Best Pos.
1	**Kashima Antlers**	30	1024	561	155	308	1,749	1,211	+538	1,838	1st
2	**Yokohama F. Marinos**	30	1024	508	180	336	1,643	1,233	+410	1,704	1st
3	**Urawa Red Diamonds**	29	994	457	174	363	1,526	1,319	+207	1,545	1st
4	**Nagoya Grampus**	29	990	448	162	380	1,475	1,370	+105	1,506	1st
5	**Gamba Osaka**	29	990	445	155	390	1,640	1,459	+181	1,490	1st
6	Shimizu S-Pulse	29	990	421	167	402	1,415	1,459	−44	1,430	2nd
7	**Sanfrecce Hiroshima**	28	960	411	165	384	1,390	1,279	+111	1,398	1st
8	Júbilo Iwata	25	848	391	142	315	1,374	1,170	+204	1,315	1st
9	**Kashiwa Reysol**	25	842	363	144	335	1,261	1,217	+44	1,233	1st
10	**Kawasaki Frontale**	19	646	340	134	172	1,193	813	+380	1,154	1st
11	**FC Tokyo**	22	732	307	157	268	1,007	934	+73	1,078	2nd
12	**Cerezo Osaka**	22	744	306	133	305	1,117	1,120	−3	1,051	3rd
13	**Vissel Kobe**	24	794	266	163	365	1,056	1,250	−194	961	3rd
14	JEF United Chiba	17	578	227	70	281	874	980	−106	751	3rd
15	Tokyo Verdy	14	476	226	43	207	767	713	+54	721	1st
16	**Albirex Niigata**	14	472	156	115	201	557	679	−122	583	6th
17	**Shonan Bellmare**	15	532	166	83	283	663	908	–245	581	5th
18	Vegalta Sendai	14	472	144	122	206	561	686	−125	554	2nd
19	**Sagan Tosu**	11	378	133	107	138	443	479	−36	506	5th
20	Omiya Ardija	12	408	129	104	175	455	579	−124	491	5th
21	Oita Trinita	11	370	108	88	174	387	512	−125	412	4th
22	**Hokkaido Consadole Sapporo**	11	370	110	68	192	472	653	−181	398	4th
23	**Kyoto Sanga**	12	352	112	53	221	428	678	−250	389	5th
24	Yokohama Flügels	6	228	117	0	111	375	373	+2	351	3rd
25	**Avispa Fukuoka**	11	360	94	51	215	384	642	–258	333	8th
26	Ventforet Kofu	8	272	69	73	130	255	404	–149	280	13th
27	Montedio Yamagata	4	136	30	36	70	108	199	−91	126	13th
28	**Yokohama FC**	3	106	19	19	68	89	203	−114	76	15th
29	Matsumoto Yamaga	2	68	13	20	35	51	94	−43	59	16th
30	Tokushima Vortis	2	72	13	11	48	50	129	–79	50	17th
31	V-Varen Nagasaki	1	34	8	6	20	39	59	−20	30	18th

League or status at 2023:

2023 J1 League teams
2023 J2 League teams
2023 J3 League teams
Defunct teams

=== Relegation history ===
Only four clubs have never been relegated from J1. Among those, only two clubs – Kashima Antlers and Yokohama F. Marinos – have participated in every league season since its establishment in 1993. The former J.League club Yokohama Flügels never experienced relegation before their merger with Yokohama Marinos in 1999.

JEF United Chiba holds the record for the longest top flight participation streak of 44 consecutive seasons in the first divisions of JSL and J.League that lasted from the establishment of JSL in 1965 and ended with their relegation in 2009. The longest ongoing top flight streak belongs to Yokohama F. Marinos who have played in the top flight since 1982 (42 seasons in a row as of 2024).

The 1998 season

When the league introduced the two-division system in 1999, they also reduced number of Division 1 clubs from 18 to 16. At the end of 1998 season, they ran the J.League Promotion Tournament to determine the two relegated clubs.

Split-season era (1999–2004, 2015–2016)

Throughout 1999 to 2003 seasons, the two bottom clubs were relegated to Division 2. To accommodate the split-season format, combined overall standings were used to determine the relegated clubs. This created a confusing situation, where for the championship race stage standings were used, while overall standing was used for relegation survival.

At end of the 2004 season, Division 1 again expanded from 16 to 18 clubs. No clubs were relegated; however, the last-placed (16th) club had to play the Promotion/Relegation Series against the 3rd placed club from J2. Again, to determine the 16th placed club, the overall standing was used instead of stage standings.

For two seasons starting in 2015, the three bottom clubs were relegated based on overall standings.

Single season era (2005–2014, 2017–2019, 2022–present)

For the next four seasons, 2005 to 2008, the number of relegating clubs was increased to 2.5, with two clubs from each division being promoted and relegated directly, and two more (15th in J1 and 3rd in J2) competing in the Promotion/Relegation Series.

In 2009, the promotion/relegation series was abandoned and three teams were directly exchanged between divisions. In 2012, promotion playoffs were introduced in J2, allowing teams that finished from 3rd to 6th to compete for the last J1 promotion place. For the 2018, 2019 and 2022 seasons, the bottom two teams are relegated and the entry playoff has the 16th team play the J2 playoff winner.

Single season era (2021)

No teams descended to J2 after the 2020 season due to the COVID-19 pandemic in Japan and its effects. Instead, four relegations were in place for the 2021 season to bring back the number of teams from 20 to 18.

==== Summary ====
Season	15th place	16th place	17th place	18th place	19th place	20th place
1998	JEF United Ichihara	**Consadole Sapporo**	Vissel Kobe	Avispa Fukuoka	Only 18 clubs participated	
1999	**Urawa Red Diamonds**	**Bellmare Hiratsuka**	Only 16 clubs participated			
2000	**Kyoto Purple Sanga**	**Kawasaki Frontale**	Only 16 clubs participated			
2001	**Avispa Fukuoka**	**Cerezo Osaka**	Only 16 clubs participated			
2002	**Sanfrecce Hiroshima**	**Consadole Sapporo**	Only 16 clubs participated			
2003	**Vegalta Sendai**	**Kyoto Purple Sanga**	Only 16 clubs participated			
2004	Cerezo Osaka	Kashiwa Reysol †	Only 16 clubs participated			
2005	Shimizu S-Pulse	**Kashiwa Reysol** ‡	**Tokyo Verdy 1969**	**Vissel Kobe**	Only 18 clubs participated	
2006	Ventforet Kofu	**Avispa Fukuoka** ‡	**Cerezo Osaka**	**Kyoto Purple Sanga**	Only 18 clubs participated	
2007	Omiya Ardija	**Sanfrecce Hiroshima** ‡	**Ventforet Kofu**	**Yokohama FC**	Only 18 clubs participated	
2008	JEF United Chiba	Júbilo Iwata †	**Tokyo Verdy**	**Consadole Sapporo**	Only 18 clubs participated	
2009	Montedio Yamagata	**Kashiwa Reysol**	**Oita Trinita**	**JEF United Chiba**	Only 18 clubs participated	
2010	Vissel Kobe	**FC Tokyo**	**Kyoto Sanga**	**Shonan Bellmare**	Only 18 clubs participated	
2011	Urawa Red Diamonds	**Ventforet Kofu**	**Avispa Fukuoka**	**Montedio Yamagata**	Only 18 clubs participated	
2012	Albirex Niigata	**Vissel Kobe**	**Gamba Osaka**	**Consadole Sapporo**	Only 18 clubs participated	
2013	Ventforet Kofu	**Shonan Bellmare**	**Júbilo Iwata**	**Oita Trinita**	Only 18 clubs participated	
2014	Shimizu S-Pulse	**Omiya Ardija**	**Cerezo Osaka**	**Tokushima Vortis**	Only 18 clubs participated	
2015	Albirex Niigata	**Matsumoto Yamaga**	**Shimizu S-Pulse**	**Montedio Yamagata**	Only 18 clubs participated	
2016	Albirex Niigata	**Nagoya Grampus**	**Shonan Bellmare**	**Avispa Fukuoka**	Only 18 clubs participated	
2017	Sanfrecce Hiroshima	**Ventforet Kofu**	**Albirex Niigata**	**Omiya Ardija**	Only 18 clubs participated	
2018	Nagoya Grampus	Júbilo Iwata †	**Kashiwa Reysol**	**V-Varen Nagasaki**	Only 18 clubs participated	
2019	Sagan Tosu	Shonan Bellmare	**Matsumoto Yamaga**	**Júbilo Iwata**	Only 18 clubs participated	
2020	Yokohama FC	Shimizu S-Pulse	Vegalta Sendai	Shonan Bellmare	Only 18 clubs participated	
2021	Kashiwa Reysol	Shonan Bellmare	**Tokushima Vortis**	**Oita Trinita**	**Vegalta Sendai**	**Yokohama FC**
2022	Gamba Osaka	Kyoto Sanga †	**Shimizu S-Pulse**	**Júbilo Iwata**	Only 18 clubs participated	
2023	Shonan Bellmare	Gamba Osaka	Kashiwa Reysol	**Yokohama FC**	Only 18 clubs participated	
2024	Shonan Bellmare	Albirex Niigata	Kashiwa Reysol	**Júbilo Iwata**	**Hokkaido Consadole Sapporo**	**Sagan Tosu**
2025				**Yokohama FC**	**Shonan Bellmare**	**Albirex Niigata**

* Bold designates relegated clubs;
† Won the Pro/rele Series or entry playoff;
‡ Lost the Pro/rele Series or entry playoff and relegated

== Other tournaments ==
Domestic tournaments

- Fujifilm Super Cup (1994–present)
- The JFA Emperor's Cup (1921–present)
- YBC Levain Cup (1992–present, except 1995)

International tournaments

- FIFA Club World Cup (2007–2008, 2011–2012, 2015–2016)
- AFC Champions League Elite (1969, 1986/87–2002/03, 2004–present)
- AFC Champions League Two (2024/25–present)

Defunct tournament

- Suntory Championship (1993–2004, excluding 1996)
- Sanwa Bank Cup (1994–1997)
- JOMO All-Stars Soccer (1993–2007)
- A3 Champions Cup (2003–2007)
- Promotion/Relegation Series (2004–2008)
- Pan-Pacific Championship (2008, 2009)
- J1/J2 play-offs (2018, 2019, 2022)
- J-League Cup/Copa Sudamericana Championship (2008–2013)

== Players and managers ==
=== Players ===
- List of foreign J.League players

=== Managers ===
- List of J.League managers

== Media coverage ==
=== Japan ===
DAZN brought exclusive digital broadcasting rights for the entire J.League matches (including J1 League itself) until 2033. The league was also available to stream on Abema through Abema de DAZN subscription plan.

=== Outside Japan ===
Selected matches are livestreamed globally (excluding the following regions) via J.League International YouTube channel.

Country/region	Broadcaster
Australia	Stan Sport
Brazil	Zico
China	K-Ball (Note: Including J2 League): Regional broadcaster (FTA & pay); Tianjin TV; Streaming; Penguin Sports
Hong Kong	TVB
Macau	M Plus
Thailand	BG Sports
Türkiye	KRT
Vietnam	VTV

== Sponsorship ==
=== Title Partner ===
- Meiji Yasuda Life

=== Official Broadcasting Partner ===
- DAZN

=== Top Partners ===
- AiDEM
- Route-Inn Hotels
- ÆON
- NTT docomo
- KONAMI
- Ichigo

=== League Cup Partner ===
- Yamazaki Biscuit

=== Super Cup Partner ===
- Fujifilm Business Innovation

=== Equipment Partner ===
- Adidas

=== Sports Promotion Partner ===
- Japan Sports Council

=== Ticketing Partner ===
- PIA Corporation

=== EC Platform Partner ===
- Rakuten

=== Technology Partner ===
- NTT Group

=== Supporting Companies ===
- The Asahi Shimbun
- Sportsnavi
- Deloitte
- Data Stadium
- IMAGICA GROUP
- LINE LY Corp
- Suntory Wellness
- Nikon
- TikTok
- Kearney
- Pony Canyon

== See also ==
- J.League records and statistics
- List of Japanese football champions
- Japanese association football league system
- WE League
