= Alba Flores Robla =

Spanish poet

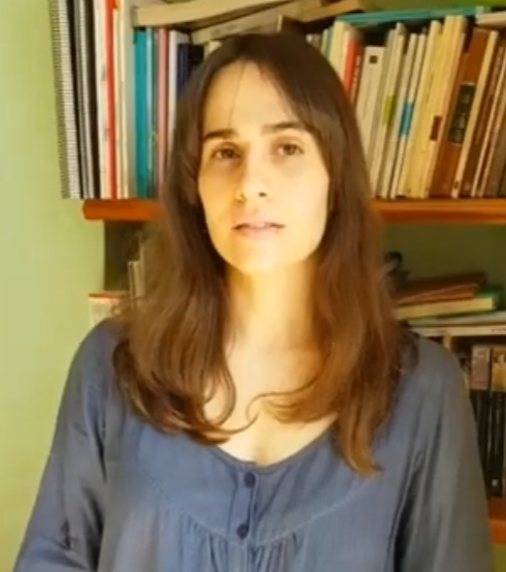
- Reciting her poem "Tu hueco supraesternal" in March 2020
- Born: 28 December 1992 (age 33); Madrid, Spain
- Education: University of León
- Occupations: Poet, teacher
- Awards: Adonáis Poetry Award (2017); Critical Eye Award (2018)

Alba Flores Robla (born 28 December 1992) is a Spanish poet, recipient of the Adonáis Poetry Award in 2017 and the Critical Eye Award in 2018.

== Biography ==
Alba Flores Robla was born in Madrid in 1992. She moved to León with her family at age nine. She graduated from the University of León with a degree in English philology.

She gained notoriety by posting her poems on the blog Desequilibrios de medianoche (Midnight Imbalances), and her videopoems on several YouTube channels. In March 2017, she self-published the poetry collection Tu hueco supraesternal (Your Suprasternal Hollow), and that June she published Autorregalo (Self-Gift). A year later, after winning the Adonáis Award, she published Digan adiós a la muchacha (Say Goodbye to the Girl). In 2021, she published her fourth poetry collection, AZCA, with Ediciones Venera.

In October 2016, she co-founded #Plataforma, a project to promote the work of young authors from León.

Flores has written for literary magazines such as Anáfora, Piedra de Molino, El Fuego, and Mirlo, and participated in cultural events such as the Palabra y Literatura series in Gordoncillo and the scenic project Poesía o barbarie. The latter was organized by the Masquepalabras collective at the Cuartel del Conde-Duque in Madrid in May 2019, and also featured Soleá Morente, María Nieto, and Rosana Acquaroni.

In 2019, her poems were included in Piel fina. Poesía joven española (Thin Skin: Young Spanish Poetry), a sampling of 35 poets born between 1990 and 2001, compiled by Rosa Berbel, Juan Domingo Aguilar, and Mario Vega. The 2020 Antología de las mejores poesías de amor en lengua castellana (Anthology of the Best Love Poems in the Spanish Language), edited by Luis María Anson, includes her "El amor es sencillo a veces" (Love is Simple Sometimes).

As of 2024, in addition to writing poetry, Flores works as a secondary education teacher.

== Awards and recognition ==
- 2017 – Adonáis Poetry Award for her collection Digan adiós a la muchacha. According to the jury, Flores was awarded "for representing with complex simplicity and precise doses of irony and surprise, with great evocative power and visual plasticity, the farewell to adolescence." Several of the poems are dedicated to the Leonese town of Villarrodrigo de Ordás. The book was published in March 2018.
- 2018 – Critical Eye Award for Digan adiós a la muchacha. The jury described it as "a luminous book, full of emotion, with imagery that returns to the family origin, beyond the big cities." This award is given by the Radio Nacional de España program El ojo crítica, on air since 1990.

== Works ==
=== Books ===
- Tu hueco supraesternal, Amazon CreateSpace, 2017. Reprinted by Eolas, 2024.
- Autorregalo, Ediciones en Huida, 2017.
- Digan adiós a la muchacha, Ediciones Rialp, 2018.
- AZCA, Colectivo Laika/Mr. Griffin, 2021.

=== In anthologies ===
- Piel fina. Poesía joven española (eds. Juan Domingo Aguilar, Rosa Berbel, Mario Vega), Ediciones Maremágnum, Oviedo, 2019.
- Antología de las mejores poesías de amor en lengua castellana (ed. Luis María Ansón), La Esfera de los Libros, Madrid, 2020.
- Millennials: nueve poetas (ed. Gonzalo Torné), Alba Editorial, Madrid, 2021.
