= Critical Eye Awards =

Awards given to young talents under 40 years old

- Sponsored by: Radio Nacional de España
- Country: Spain
- First award: 1990
- Website: Official website

The Critical Eye Awards (Spanish: Premios Ojo Crítico) were created in 1990 by the Radio Nacional de España (RNE) program El Ojo Crítico. They recognize and promote the work of young talents, under 40 years of age, who have distinguished themselves in the preceding year in the modalities of plastic arts, narrative, poetry, film, theater, classical music, modern music, and dance. Since 1997, RNE has also presented the Special Critical Eye Award for an outstanding career. The Ibero-American Critical Eye Award has been presented biennially since 2014.

== List of winners ==
=== Plastic Arts ===
- 1990: Jaume Plensa (sculptor)
- 1991: Pedro G. Romero (painter)
- 1992: Rogelio López Cuenca (painter)
- 1993: Victoria Civera (painter)
- 1994: Sergio Sanz (painter)
- 1995: Darío Álvarez Basso (painter)
- 1996: Juan Asensio (sculptor)
- 1997: Daniel Canogar (photographer)
- 1998: Javier Pérez
- 1999: Fernando Gutiérrez
- 2000: Eulàlia Valldosera
- 2001: Alberto Reguera (painter)
- 2002: Santiago Mayo
- 2003: Tomás Vaquero Ibáñez
- 2004: Esther Pizarro (sculptor)
- 2005: Mar Solís (sculptor)
- 2006: Laura Lio (sculptor)
- 2007: Santiago Cirugeda (architect)
- 2008: Lara Armalcegui
- 2009: Cristina Lucas
- 2010: Asier Mendizabal
- 2011: Sara Ramo
- 2012: Fernando García Dory
- 2013: Julia Spínola
- 2014: Jerónimo Elespe
- 2015: Paula Rubio Infante
- 2016: Patricia Esquivias
- 2017: Paloma Polo
- 2018: June Crespo (sculptor)
- 2019: David Bestué
- 2020: El Palomar (Mariokissme and R. Marcos Mota)

=== Narrative ===
- 1990: Javier García Sánchez
- 1991: Pedro Zarraluki
- 1992: Miquel de Palol
- 1993: Felipe Benítez Reyes
- 1994: Juan Manuel González
- 1995: Irene Gracia
- 1996: Andrés Ibáñez Segura
- 1997: Juan Manuel de Prada
- 1998: Lorenzo Silva
- 1999: Alejandro Cuevas
- 2000: Fernando Royuela
- 2001: Marta Sanz
- 2002: Ana Prieto Nadal
- 2003: Albert Sánchez Piñol
- 2004: Isaac Rosa
- 2005: Pilar Adón
- 2006: Julián Rodríguez Marcos
- 2007: Ismael Grasa
- 2008: Jon Bilbao
- 2009: Alberto Olmos
- 2010: Pablo Gutiérrez
- 2011: Ignacio Ferrando
- 2012: Use Lahoz
- 2013: Sergio del Molino
- 2014: Juan Gómez Bárcena
- 2015: Sara Mesa
- 2016: Alicia Kopf
- 2017: Aroa Moreno
- 2018: Natàlia Cerezo
- 2019: Irene Vallejo
- 2020: Miqui Otero

=== Poetry ===
- 1997: Pablo García Casado
- 1998: Eduardo García
- 1999: Enrique Falcón
- 2000: Antonio Lucas
- 2001: Luis Muñoz
- 2002: Javier Rodríguez Marcos
- 2003: Luis Bagué Quílez
- 2004: José Luis Piquero
- 2005: Juan Antonio Bernier and Antonio Méndez Rubio
- 2006: Ana Isabel Conejo
- 2007: Luis Artigue
- 2008: Esther Ramón and Francisco José Sevilla
- 2009: Yolanda Castaño
- 2010: Rubén Martín Díaz
- 2011: Aaron García Peña
- 2012: Vanesa Pérez-Sauquillo
- 2013: Abraham Garjera
- 2014: Ben Clark
- 2015: Rafael Espejo
- 2016: Carlos Pardo
- 2017: Fernando del Val
- 2018: Alba Flores Robla
- 2019: Rosa Berbel
- 2020: Raquel Vázquez

=== Film ===
- 1990: Agustí Villaronga
- 1991: Emma Suárez and Rosa Verger
- 1992: Gabino Diego
- 1993: Ariadna Gil
- 1994: Icíar Bollaín
- 1995: Ruth Gabriel
- 1996: Candela Peña
- 1997: Juan Carlos Fresnadillo
- 1998: Mercè Pons
- 1999: Benito Zambrano
- 2000: Marta Belaustegui and Ángeles González-Sinde
- 2001: Leonor Watling
- 2002: Eduard Fernández
- 2003: Isabel Coixet
- 2004: Marta Etura
- 2005: Mercedes Álvarez
- 2006: Daniel Sánchez Arévalo
- 2007: María Vázquez
- 2008: Roser Aguilar
- 2009: Bárbara Lennie
- 2010: Rodrigo Cortés
- 2011: Kike Maíllo
- 2012: Aida Folch
- 2013: Macarena Gómez
- 2014: Carlos Marqués-Marcet
- 2015: Dani de la Torre
- 2016: Jonás Trueba
- 2017: Carla Simón
- 2018: Clara Roquet
- 2019: Enric Auquer
- 2020: Patricia López Arnaiz

=== Theater ===
- 1990: Verónica Forqué and Kiti Mánver
- 1991: Emma Ozores
- 1992: Carlos Hipólito
- 1993: Adriana Ozores and Sergi Belbel
- 1994: Sala Cuarta Pared de Madrid
- 1995: Las Salas Alternativas
- 1996: Natalia Menéndez
- 1997: Alfonso Armada Rodríguez
- 1998: Blanca Portillo
- 1999: The play Las Manos
- 2000: Juan Mayorga
- 2001: Moma Teatre and Espai Moma Valencia
- 2002: Laila Ripoll
- 2003: José Pascual
- 2004: Israel Elejalde
- 2005: Angélica Liddell
- 2006: Compañía Teatro Meridional
- 2007: Festival del Sur
- 2008: Ana Zamora
- 2009: Sala La Guindalera
- 2010: María Isasi
- 2011: Irene Escolar
- 2012: Teatro Tribueñe
- 2013: José Padilla
- 2014: La Joven Compañía
- 2015: Carlota Ferrer
- 2016: Nao Albet and Marcel Borràs
- 2017: Kulunka Teatro
- 2018: Lucía Miranda
- 2019: Teatro En Vilo
- 2020: La estampida

=== Classical music ===
- 1990: Víctor Pablo Pérez
- 1991: María Bayo
- 1992: Anabel García del Castillo
- 1993: José Antonio Sainz Alfaro
- 1994: David del Puerto
- 1995: Ernest Martínez Izquierdo
- 1996: María José Montiel
- 1997: Joseba Torre
- 1998: Pilar Jurado
- 1999: Jorge Elías
- 2000: Juan José Mena
- 2001: Gloria Isabel Ramos
- 2002: Asier Polo
- 2003: Juan Medina
- 2004: Mariola Cantarero
- 2005: Javier Perianes
- 2006: Luisa Domingo
- 2007: Cuarteto Quiroga
- 2008: Pablo Sáinz Villegas
- 2009: Luis Fernando Pérez
- 2010: Pablo Heras-Casado
- 2011: Cuarteto Leonor
- 2012: Fernando Velázquez
- 2013: La Ritirata
- 2014: Guillermo Pastrana
- 2015: Isabel Villanueva
- 2016: Eduardo Fernández
- 2017: Raquel García-Tomás
- 2018: Clara Andrada
- 2019: Ruth Iniesta
- 2020: María Dueñas

=== Modern Music ===
- 1990: Luz Casal
- 1991: 21 Japonesas
- 1992: Vicente Amigo
- 1993: Rosario Flores
- 1994: Manolo Tena
- 1995: Mercedes Ferrer, and mention to Mayte Martín
- 1996: Marc Parrot
- 1997–2002: (not given)
- 2003: Deluxe
- 2004: Lori Meyers
- 2005: Cycle
- 2006: We Are Standard
- 2007: Facto delafé y las flores azules
- 2008: Vetusta Morla
- 2009: Delorean
- 2010: El Guincho
- 2011: Manel
- 2012: John Talabot
- 2013: Guadalupe Plata
- 2014: León Benavente
- 2015: Belako
- 2016: Papaya
- 2017: Rosalía
- 2018: María Arnal and Marcel Bagès
- 2019: Soleá Morente
- 2020: C. Tangana

=== Dance ===
- 2013: Antonio Ruz
- 2014: Olga Pericet
- 2015: Luz Arcas
- 2016: Daniel Doña
- 2017: Alicia Amatriain
- 2018: Marco Flores
- 2019: Jesús Carmona
- 2020: Jesús Rubio Gamo

=== Special Critical Eye Award ===
- 1997: Ana María Matute (writer)
- 1998: Alfredo Kraus (tenor)
- 1999: Josep Maria Flotats (actor and theater director)
- 2000: Luis García Berlanga (filmmaker)
- 2001: José Hierro (poet)
- 2002: Antonio López García (painter)
- 2003: María Jesús Valdés (actress)
- 2004: Elías Querejeta (film producer)
- 2005: Santiago Calatrava (architect)
- 2006: Pablo García Baena (poet)
- 2007: Joaquín Sabina (singer-songwriter)
- 2008: Pedro Almodóvar (filmmaker)
- 2009: Enrique Morente (singer)
- 2010: Carlos Saura (filmmaker)
- 2011: Joan Manuel Serrat (singer-songwriter)
- 2012: Joaquín Achúcarro (pianist)
- 2013: Carmen Balcells (literary agent)
- 2014: Albert Boadella (actor and theater director)
- 2015: Darío Villanueva (director of the Royal Spanish Academy)
- 2016: José Luis Garci (film director)
- 2017: Joan Matabosch (artistic director)
- 2018: Jorge Herralde (editor)
- 2019: Pedro Iturralde (saxophonist)
- 2020: Cristina García Rodero (photographer)

=== Special 30th Anniversary Award ===
- 2013: Loquillo

=== Ibero-American Award ===
- 2014: Nélida Piñon (Brazilian writer)
- 2016: Nuno Júdice (Portuguese poet)
- 2018: Héctor Alterio (Spanish/Argentine actor)
- 2020: Jorge Drexler (Uruguayan musician)
