= Andres Alcantara =

Spanish sculptor, engraver and painter (born 1960)

Andrés Alcántara
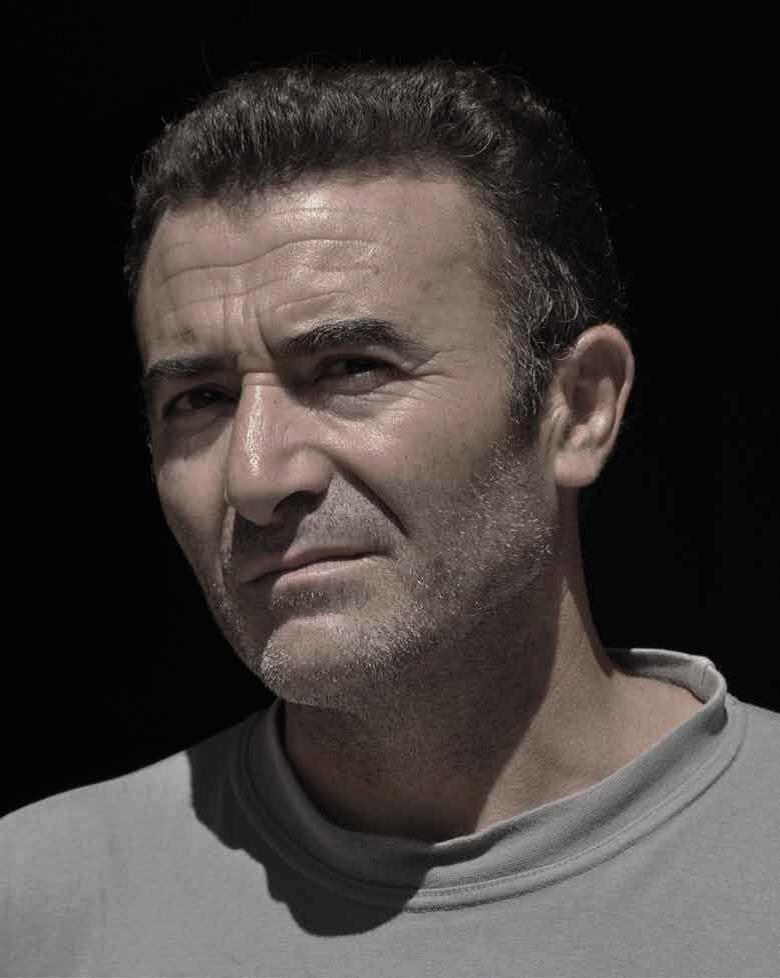
- Born: 22 November 1960 (age 65); Torredelcampo, Jaén, Spain
- Education: Complutense University of Madrid
- Known for: Sculptor, engraver, painter

Andrés Fernández Alcántara (born 22 November 1960) is a Spanish sculptor, engraver and painter. He lives and works in Alcala de Henares, Spain.

== Biography ==
Andrés Alcántara was born in Torredelcampo, Jaén, Spain, and since an early age he began sculpting in joinery workshops and stone carving workshops. Later, he became a student at the College of Fine Arts at the Complutense University of Madrid and the Royal Academy of Fine Arts of San Fernando in Madrid.

== Work ==
=== Sculpture ===
Alcántara is one of the few Spanish sculptors that still practises direct carving. He has carried out several solo exhibitions, mainly in Spain, France, Portugal and China. He has also participated in collective exhibitions that have been developed in cities such as Madrid, Murcia, Barcelona, Alcalá de Henares, Antwerp, Paris and Lisbon. After participating in several Biennials (1986 and 1987 in Madrid), his works have been exhibited in national and international galleries and spaces such as: Cuartel del Conde-Duque (Madrid), São Bento Gallery (Lisbon), Antonio Prates Gallery (Lisbon), La Fenêtre Gallery (Paris), Royal Museum of Fine Arts Antwerp, Shanghai Sculpture Space (Shanghai), etc. From expressionist beginnings he has evolved towards a primitivist sculpture with an increase of the iconographic repertoire.

=== Painting and Engraving ===
Alcántara has focused not only on sculptural works, but he's also known as an engraver and painter. An example was the exhibition of portraits "Cervantes and Don Quixote", which commemorated the fourth centenary of the publication of Don Quixote of Miguel de Cervantes in 2005.

== Exhibitions ==
=== Solo exhibitions ===
- 1988 “First Stage”. Emilio Navarro Gallery. Madrid.
- 1990 "Archetypes 1980/1990" Exhibition Hall of the Provincial Council. Jaén, Spain.
- 1992 “Alcántara”. Cuartel del Conde-Duque. Madrid.
- 1994 “Alcántara Sculptor”. Colegio del Rey Foundation/Casa de la Entrevista. Alcalá de Henares, Madrid.
- 1997 “Alcántara”. São Bento Gallery. Lisbon.
- 2001 “Alcántara Sculptor”. Antonio Prates Gallery. Lisbon.
- 2005 "Cervantes and Don Quixote". Colegio del Rey Foundation/Oidor Chapel. Alcalá de Henares, Madrid.
- 2008 “Eight bridges, Sculptures and Paintings”. Shanghai Sculpture Space. Shanghai, China. “Eight bridges, Sculptures and Dragons”. Times Square. Shanghai, China. // “Andrés Alcántara”. Lexus. Alcalá de Henares, Madrid.
- 2011 “Alcántara”. Provincial Council. Jaén, Spain
- 2013 “Alcántara”. City Hall/Casa de la Entrevista. Alcalá de Henares, Madrid.

=== Collective exhibitions ===
- 1986 Biennial Villa de Madrid. Cuartel del Conde-Duque. Madrid. // 1st Biennial Sculpture Exhibition. Murcia, Spain.
- 1987 Biennial Villa de Madrid. Cuartel del Conde-Duque. Madrid.
- 1988 XII National Sculpture Contest. Caja de Madrid.
- 1990 XIV National Sculpture Contest. Caja de Madrid. // “Emerging artists”. Villanueva Gallery. Madrid.
- 1991 Contemporary Map Gallery. Barcelona.
- 1992 Cuartel del Conde-Duque. Madrid. // Fuentenebros. Ortíz-Cañabate. Spanish Contemporary Art. Madrid.
- 1994 East and Complutense. Community of Madrid. Ministry of Education and Culture. // Print Fair Portuguese Silk Screen Printing Centre. Lisbon.
- 1995 La Fenêtre Gallery. Paris. // The Classical Mythology in painting and sculpture today. Spanish Society of Classical Studies. Madrid. // Print Fair Portuguese Silk Screen Printing Centre. Lisbon.
- 1996 “Proposal”. La Fenêtre Gallery. Paris. // Print Fair Portuguese Silk Screen Printing Centre. Lisbon.
- 1997 ARCOMadrid 97 “Salon de Printemps”. // La Fenêtre Gallery. Paris.
- 1998 ARCOMadrid 98 // São Bento Gallery. Lisbon. // European Young Sculptors. Royal Museum of Fine Arts Antwerp, Belgium. // Travel Exhibition celebrating the Caja Madrid awards. Itinerary: City Museum, Madrid. Diagonal-Sarria, Barcelona. Trade Employers Federation, Burgos. Museum of Santa Cruz, Toledo.
- 2000, 2001, 2002 Print Fair Portuguese Silk Screen Printing Centre. Lisbon.
- 2004 "Obstacles in the way". Alcántara and Xavier. Palace of Villardompardo Cultural Center. Provincial Council. Jaén, Spain
- 2006, 2007 Print Fair Portuguese Silk Screen Printing Centre. Lisbon.
- 2011 "The Universes of Cervantes". Oidor Chapel. Alcalá de Henares, Madrid.

== Recognition ==
- 1986 Award of acquisition of works in the I Biennial of Sculpture in Murcia (Spain).
- 1990 First Prize at the XIV National Sculpture Contest. Madrid.
- 1992 Second prize at the XXII Painting and Sculpture Contest, Rafael Zabaleta. Quesada, Jaén (Spain). // Silver Medal at the XX National Art Competition. Sculpture Prize. Guadalajara.
- 1994 Second Prize at the XVIII International Sculpture Competition Santisteban del Puerto, Jaén (Spain).
- 1995 First Prize at the International Sculpture Competition, Punta Umbria, Huelva (Spain).
- 1996 First Prize at the XIX International Sculpture Competition Jacinto Higueras. Santisteban del Puerto, Jaén (Spain).
- 2000 Special Mention. XXXII National Art Competition. Sculpture Prize, Guadalajara.
- 2006 First Prize in engraved printing. Estampa '06. Lisbon.
- 2008 Award "Gold Medal of Torredelcampo", Jaén (Spain).
- 2011 Prize awarded by the Andalusian Association of Writers and Literary Critics.
