= June Crespo =

- Born: June Crespo Oyaga; 1982 (age 42–43); Pamplona, Spain
- Education: University of the Basque Country
- Occupation: Artist
- Awards: Critical Eye Award (2018)
- Website: junecrespo.com

June Crespo Oyaga (born 1982) is a Spanish artist.

== Biography ==
June Crespo was born in Pamplona in 1982, and earned a licentiate in fine arts from the University of the Basque Country in 2005. For her artistic training she attended the Lupa e Imán Artistic Practice Workshop in San Sebastián in 2005, and the following year, Kunsthaus Bregenz in Austria. In 2014 she trained at the International Artists Studio Program in Stockholm, and from 2015 to 2017, at De Ateliers in Amsterdam.

She works in lithography and drawing, as well as sculpting with materials such as fabric, concrete, fiberglass, plaster, and wax. Her works are part of the collections of the Artium Museum and the Museo Reina Sofía, among others.

Her solo exhibitions include Chance Album n.º1 at etHALL in Barcelona in 2016, and Ser dos at the Galería CarrerasMugica in Bilbao in 2017. She has also participated in group exhibitions such as Hitting it off, P-exclamation in New York in 2014; en ...Ahí pero vacío in Mexico City in 2017; Querer Parecer Noche at CA2M in Madrid and internal view at Galeria Stereo in Warsaw, both in 2018; and Una dimensión ulterior at the Museo Patio Herreriano in Valladolid in 2019.

In 2013, Crespo was one of three winners (along with artist Ana Laura Aláez and researcher Adelina Moyano) of the Basque Country government's Gure Artea Awards, receiving an endowment of €25,000. In 2018, she was presented with the Critical Eye Award for Plastic Arts by Radio Nacional de España. This was followed by the Fundación María José Jove's International Art Award in 2019.

== Individual exhibitions ==
- 2013: Amatista, Sala Rekalde, Bilbao
- 2013: Reverse, Have A Window program, Turín
- 2015: Cosa y tú, Galería CarrerasMugica, Bilbao
- 2016: Chance Album nº1, etHALL, Barcelona
- 2016: Kanala, Intertextual program, MARCO, Vigo
- 2017: Ser dos, Galería CarrerasMugica, Bilbao
- 2019: No Osso, Certain Lack of Coherence, Porto
- 2020: HELMETS, Artium Museum, Vitoria-Gasteiz
- 2020 Voy, sí, Galería Heinrich Ehrhardt, Madrid

== Awards ==
- 2013: Gure Artea Award
- 2018: Critical Eye Award for Plastic Arts
- 2019: Fundación María José Jove International Art Award
