= Juan Francisco Casas =

Spanish artist and poet

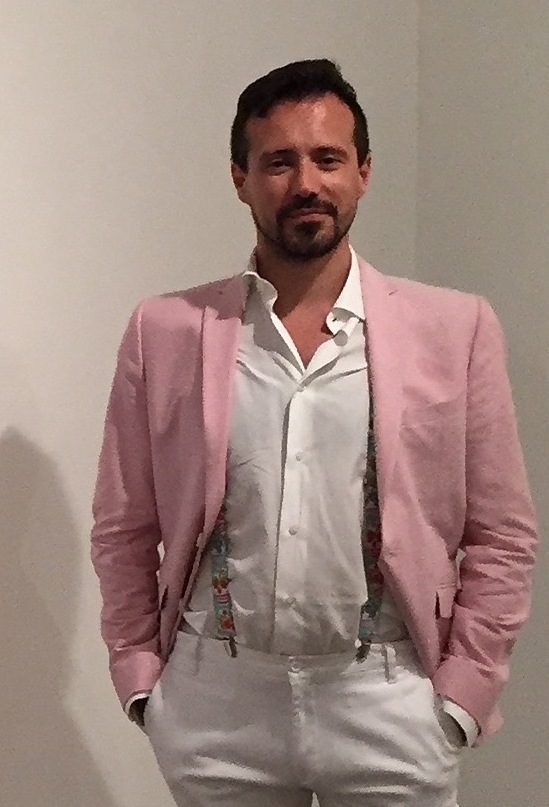
- Born: 21 September 1976 (age 50); La Carolina, Jaén, Andalusia, Spain
- Education: B.A., M.F.A., PhD, University of Granada
- Known for: Painting, drawing, photography
- Awards: ABC Prize; Award of the Royal Academy of Spain in Rome; Award of the Colegio de España en Paris

Juan Francisco Casas (born September 21, 1976 in La Carolina, Jaén, Andalusia) is a Spanish artist and poet. Casas recreates photographs he's taken as large scale oil paintings on canvas, as well as similarly scaled drawings using only blue ballpoint pens. The drawings and paintings are created in photo realistic style most of them as large as 10 feet.

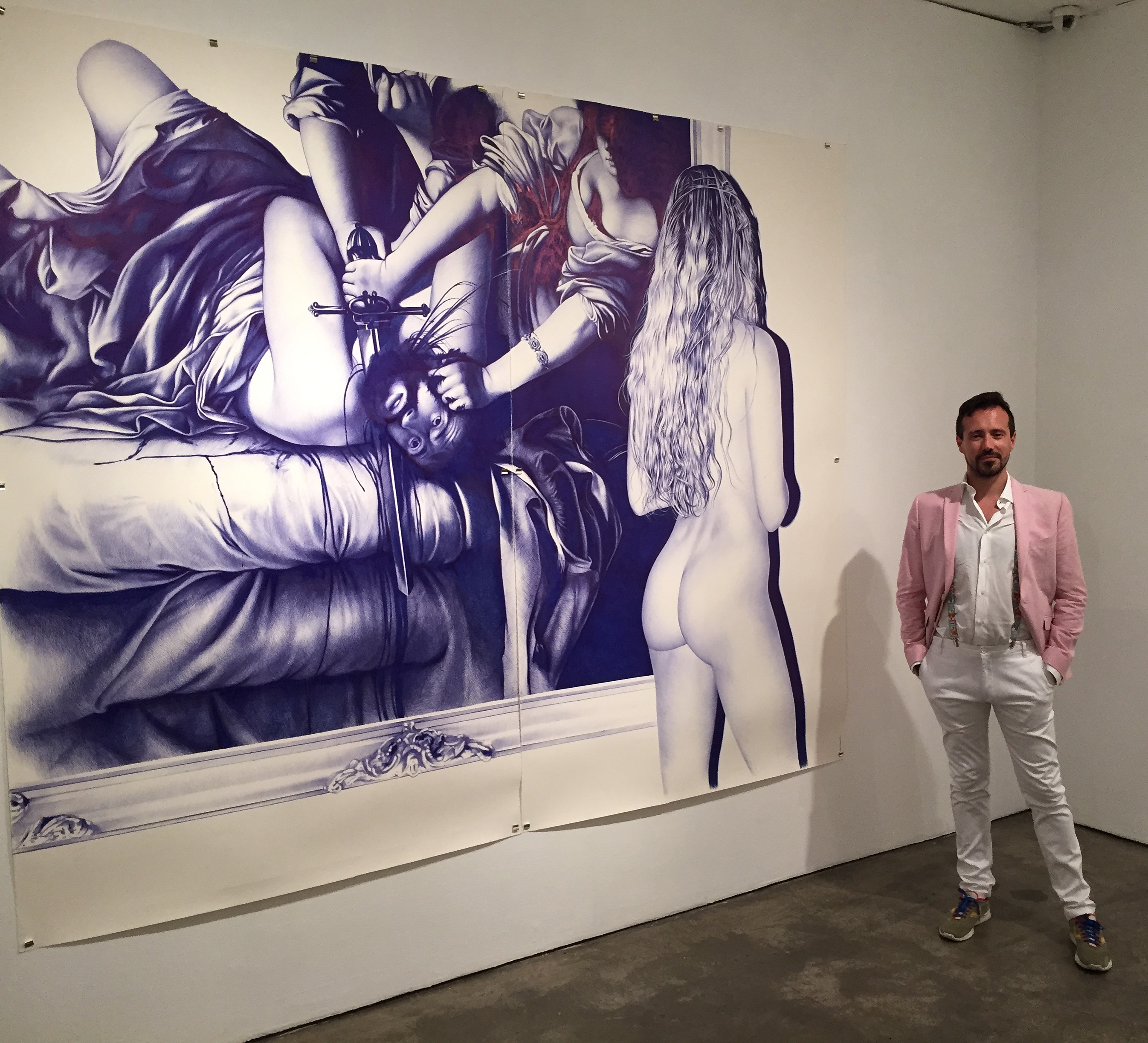
Juan Francisco Casas at Jonathan LeVine Gallery New York

== Education ==
Juan Francisco Casas Ruiz graduated with a B.A. and a M.F.A. from the University of Granada. He subsequently completed his PhD at the university in 2004, while also holding a teaching position there. During his studies he won the National Award of the Ministry of Education and Science for the best graduate qualifications in Spain, presented by Culture Minister Pilar del Castillo.

== Professional career ==
Since 2000, he has exhibited his work at museums all around the world, like the Museum Kunsthalle der Hypo-Kulturstiftung in Munich, Kunsthalle Emden (Germany), the Kunsthal Rotterdam (Netherlands), the Cube Museum Seongnam Arts Center, Seongnam, (South Korea), the Da2 Museum in Salamanca and the ARTIUM in Vitoria (Spain). He represented Spain at the 2nd Prague Biennale (curated by Flash Art Magazine and Giancarlo Politi) and has received numerous international awards: Prize of the Royal Academy of Spain in Rome, the ABC Painting Prize. and the Scholarship of the College of Spain in Paris. He has published poetry books and curated exhibitions with artists such as Joseph Kosuth and Nobuyoshi Araki. His work can be found in the Artium Museum, Vitoria, Museo ABC, Madrid, Collection of the Ministry of Foreign Affairs of Spain, Collection of the Royal Academy of Spain in Rome, Absolut Collection, etc.
