= Ana Laura Aláez =

Basque artist

- Born: 1964 (age 61–62); Bilbao, Spain
- Notable work: Catwoman; Pantalón preservativo Mujeres en zapatos de plataforma
- Website: analauraalaez.com

Ana Laura Aláez (Bilbao, 1964) is a Basque artist. She is one of the most renowned contemporary artists in Spain. She defines herself as an "emotions architect", as she transforms all her life into art, depicting her feelings in her artworks. One of her first exhibitions took place in 1992, in Fundació Joan Miró's Espai 10, in Barcelona. Alberto Peral, another Basque artist, was also featured in this exhibition.

== Biography ==
Aláez became popularly known in 1992, with an exhibition named Superficie ("surface"), held in Fundació Joan Miró's Espai 10. In this exhibition, Aláex showed three objects (Catwoman, Pantalón preservativo, and Mujeres en zapatos de plataforma) which were between pop art and gender critics, close to the performance art that became popular in the seventies.

She created the interior design project Geometrical Life, with César Rey and Daniel Holc. She is also Girls on Film's singer, and works with a musician named Ascii.disko. In 2003 she published Flúor, a book with pictures and texts where she depicted her deepest aesthetic thoughts.

In 2013, Aláez was one of three winners (along with artist June Crespo and researcher Adelina Moyano) of the Basque Country government's Gure Artea Awards, receiving an endowment of €25,000.

== Exhibitions ==
Selected solo exhibitions:

- 2007

Unknowns. Mapping Contemporary Basque Art, Guggenheim Museum Bilbao
K-stains, Casa Asia, Barcelona
Lab Project, Sarjah Museus, United Emirates
Marie's story, Space C*, Seoul

- 2006

Architecture of sound, Museo banco de la República, Bogotá
Bambi, Mercat de La Boqueria, Barcelona

- 2005

Goodbye horses (kiss the frog - the art of transformation), National Museum, Oslo
K-stains, Spanish Embassy, Seoul
Cosmo Cosmetic, Space C*, Seoul
She is in fashion, Bilbao
Black metal/pink t-shirt, Galeria Moisés Pérez de Albéniz, Pamplona

- 2004

Superficiality, Biennial of Korea
Hell disco, Taidemuseo Tennispalatsi, Helsinki, Spanish Culture Centre, Mexico
Signale der Kleidung, Contemporary Art Centre, Podewil, Berlin

- 2003

Beauty cabinet prototype, Palais de Tokyo, Paris
The Royal Trip, PS1, MoMA, New York City

- 2002

Sound recording room, Hamburger Bahnhof Museum, Berlin
Brothel, Kiosko Alfonso, La Coruña

- 2001

Brothel, Centre d'Art Santa Mònica, Barcelona
Dance & Disco, Arena Gallery, Chicago
Pink Room, Liquid Sky, Sain room, Biennale di Venezia

- 2000

Dance & Disco, Espacio Uno, Museo Reina Sofia
Liquid Sky, Biennal de Buenos Aires

- 1999

Project Room, Arco’99
Brothel, Galeria Juana de Aizpuru, Madrid; Kunstmuseum Bonn; Museum Moderner Kunst Stiftung Ludwig, Vienna; Pusan Metropolitan Art Museum (Korea)

- 1998

Prototype studio for an artist of the new millennium, Pontevedra Biennial

- 1997

She astronauts, Sala Montcada, Barcelona
She in the outer space, Istanbul Biennial

- 1996

Krystal y attyla, Área II, Rekalde, Bilbao

- 1992

Surface, Espai 10, Fundació Joan Miró

== Publications ==
- Aláez, Ana Laura (2008). Ana Laura Aláez: using your guns. León: MUSAC, Museo de Arte Contemporáneo de Castilla y León. ISBN 9788881586752.
- Arell, Berndt (curator) (2004). Fuck art, let's dance. Ana Laura Aláez. Madrid: Sociedad Estatal para la Acción Cultural Exterior. ISBN 8496008681.
- Martínez, Rosa; et al. (1997). She astronauts (1st ed.). Barcelona: Fundació "la Caixa". ISBN 8476645791.
- Sáenz de Gorbea, Xabier, ed. (1997). Ana Laura Aláez (1st ed.). Vitoria-Gasteiz: Eusko Jaurlaritzaren Argitalpen Zerbitzu Nagusia = Servicio Central de Publicaciones del Gobierno Vasco. ISBN 8445711881.
