= Aroa Moreno =

Spanish writer

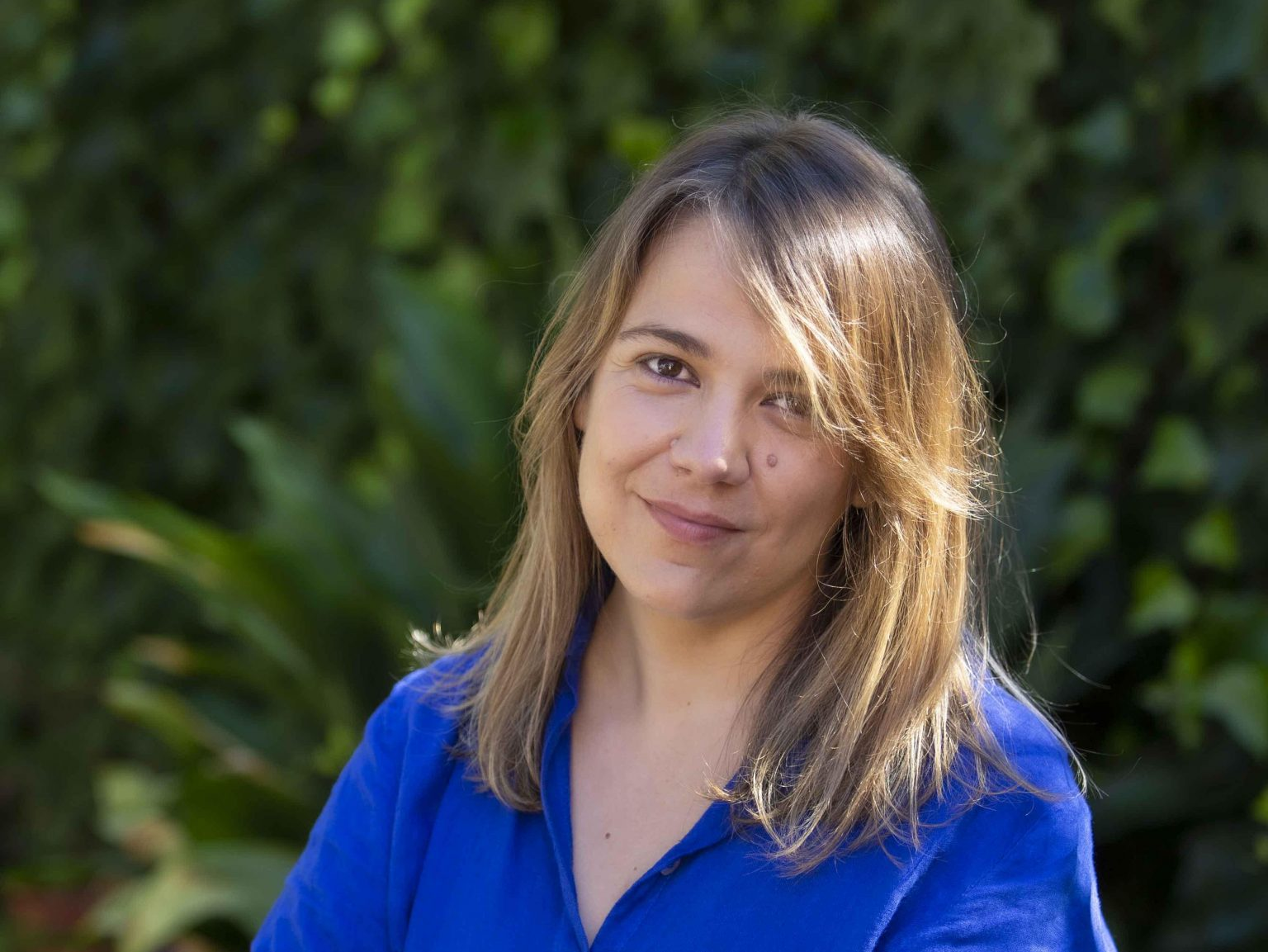
- Born: 1981; Madrid (Spain)
- Awards: Critical Eye Awards (2017); Grand Continent Award (2022)

Aroa Moreno Durán (born 1981) is a Spanish writer. She was born in Madrid, and studied at the Complutense University.

== Works ==
=== Poetry ===
- Veinte años sin lápices nuevos (Alumbre, 2009)
- Jet lag (Baile del Sol, 2016)

=== Biographies ===
- Viva la vida (biography of Frida Kahlo) (Difusión, 2011)
- La valiente alegría (Federico García Lorca) (Difusión, 2011)

=== Novels ===
- The Communist's Daughter (novel) (Caballo de Troya, 2017). Winner of the Premio Ojo Critico for Best Novel of the Year in 2017. Translated into English by Katie Whittemore, and published by Random House in 2023.
- La Bajamar (Random House, 2022). Winner of the Prix Grand Continent in 2022, and translated thanks to this prize in Polish. Nominated for the Mario Vargas Llosa Biennial Novel Prize in 2023.
