= Javier Pérez (artist) =

Spanish visual artist (b. 1968)

Javier Pérez (visual artist)
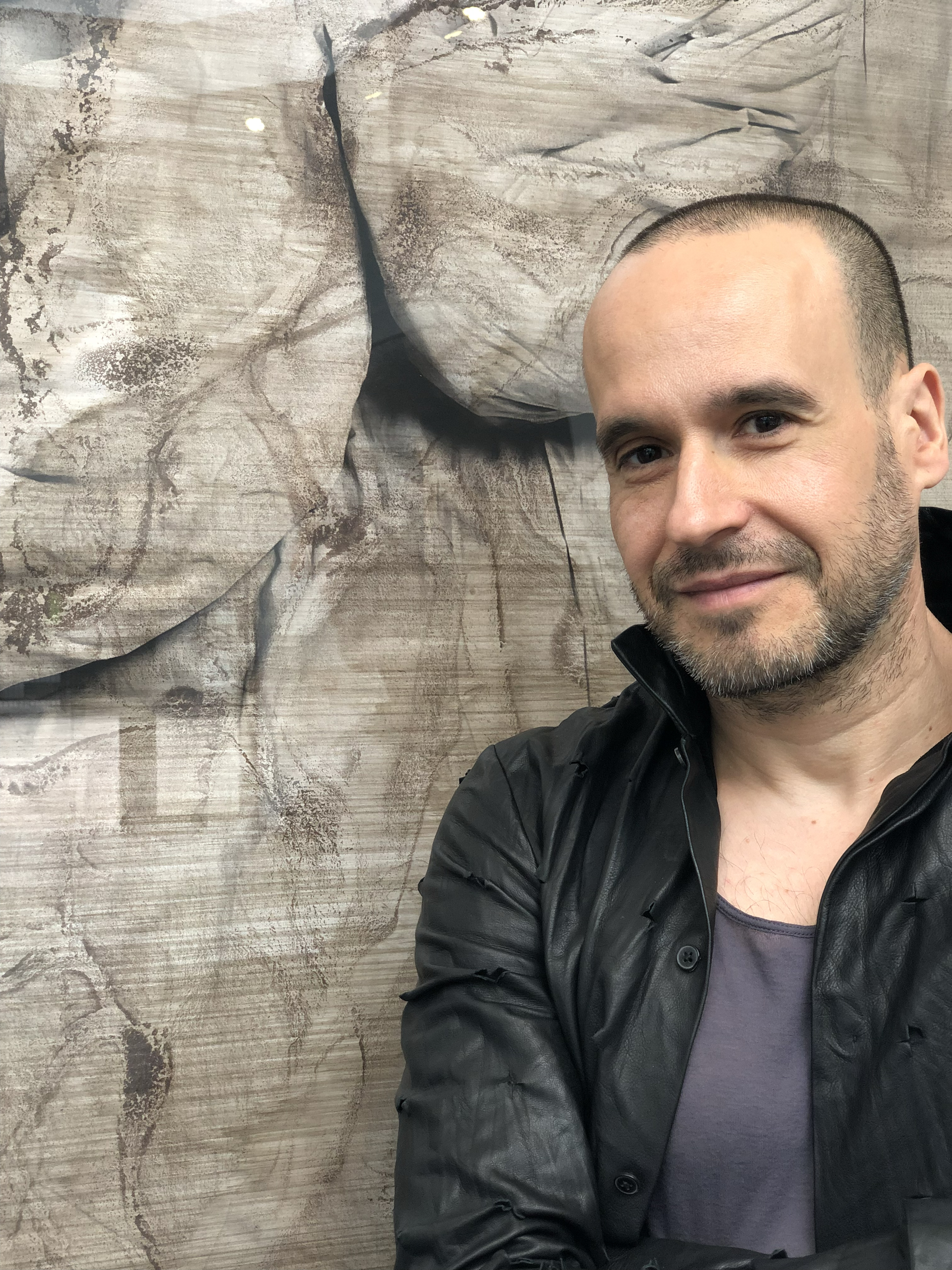
- Keteleer Gallery, Antwerp 2018
- Born: Javier Pérez González; December 31, 1968 (age 57); Bilbao, Basque country, Spain
- Education: University of the Basque Country; Beaux-Arts de Paris; Karl Hofer Gesellschaft
- Years active: 1995–present
- Known for: Installation art, sculpture, Video art, performance
- Notable work: Carroña, glass sculpture; En puntas, video instalation; Un pedazo de cielo cristalizado, permanent instalation
- Movement: Contemporary
- Awards: Gure Artea 1998, Basque Government, Spain; Critical Eye Award 1998, Spain
- Website: javierperez.es

Javier Pérez (born 31 December 1968, Bilbao, Basque Country, Spain) is a Spanish contemporary visual artist.

He is known for his large-scale installations and multidisciplinary work, which includes sculpture, drawing, photography, video installation and performance art. His artistic practice often explores themes such as the body, identity, memory, and transformation.

In 1998, he received the Gure Artea Prize from the Basque Government and the Ojo Crítico Award from Radio Nacional de España. In 2002, he represented Spain at the 49th Venice Biennale (Italy).

== Early life and education ==
Javier Pérez was born in Bilbao, in the Basque Country, Spain, on 31 December 1968. He is the youngest of three siblings in a family of educators.

He studied fine arts at the University of the Basque Country (in Basque Euskal Herriko Unibertsitatea), combining his academic training with contemporary dance studies.

He graduated in 1992, having participated in Erasmus exchange programs at the Karl HoferGesellschaft in Berlin and the École Nationale Supérieure des Beaux-Arts (ENSBA) in Paris.

In 1993, he was awarded a grant from the Provincial Council of Bizkaia to support artistic development abroad, enabling him to pursue a master's degree at the ENSBA in Paris, where he also continued his dance training. In 1994, a grant from the French Ministry of Culture allowed him to extend his stay in France.

== Career ==
In 1995, his work was included in the Passions privées exhibition at the Musée d'Art Moderne de Paris. In 1996, he held his first solo exhibition, Rester à l'intérieur, at Galerie Chantal Crousel in Paris, supported by a grant from the Délégation aux Arts Plastiques.

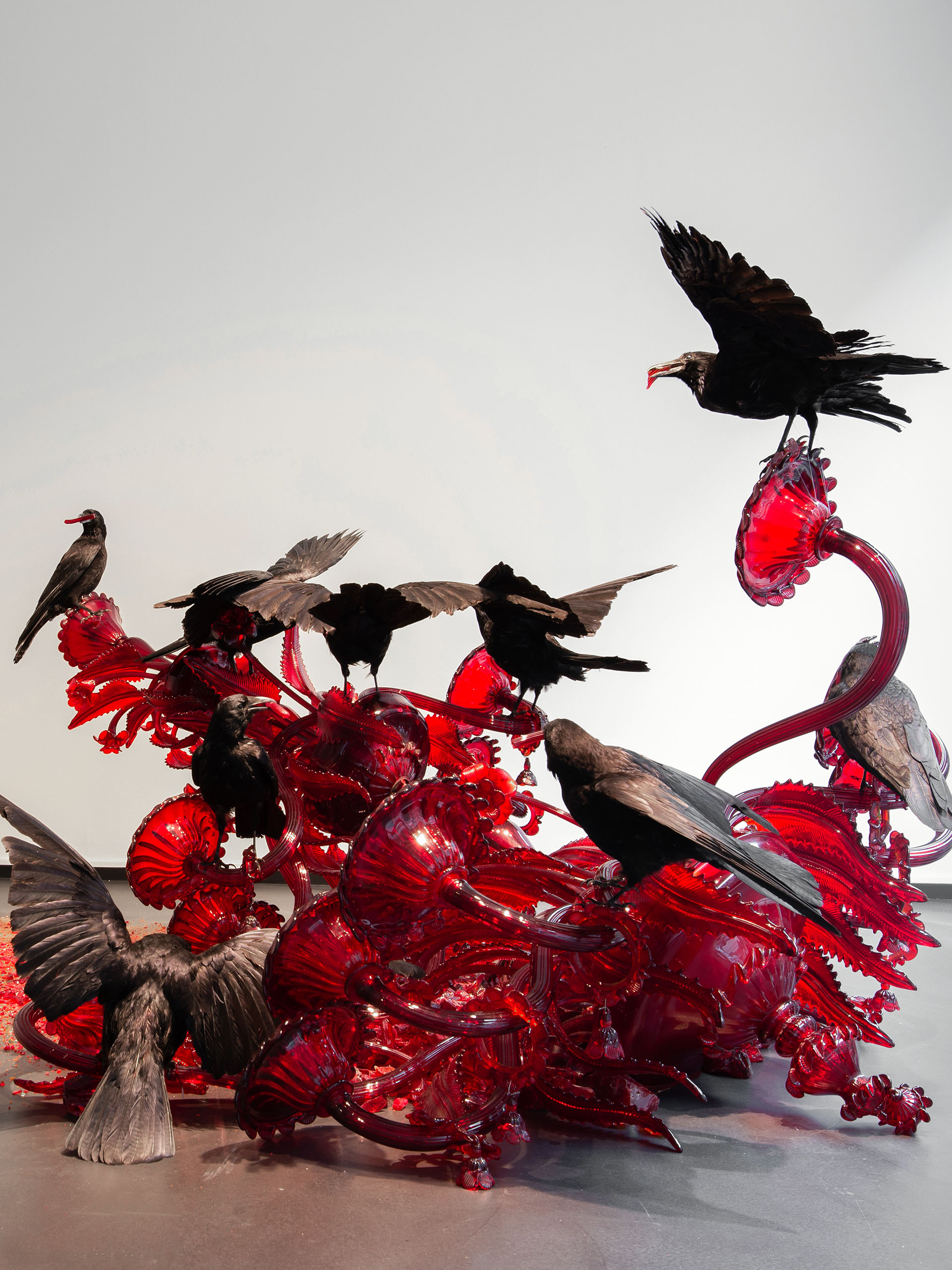
Carroña | Keteleer Gallery, Antwerp (2018)

In 1997, his work was selected by art historian Georges Didi-Huberman for the exhibition L'empreinte, at the Centre Pompidou. Later that year, he presented Estancias, his first solo museum exhibition, at the Musée d’Art Moderne et Contemporain de Strasbourg.

He moved to Barcelona in 1998 after spending five years in the French capital, and has worked continuously there ever since. That same year, he presented Hábitos at the Museo Nacional Centro de Arte Reina Sofía (MNCARS) in Madrid and received the Gure Artea 98 Prize from the Basque Government. In 2000, his work was included in La torre herida por el rayo: Lo imposible como meta (The Tower Struck by Lightning: The Impossible as a Goal), a group exhibition of Basque artists at the Guggenheim Museum Bilbao, in which the author presented one of his first large-format sound installations: La torre de sonido (The Tower of Sound).

In 2001, Pérez represented Spain at the 49th Venice Biennale with the installation Un pedazo de cielo cristalizado (A Piece of Crystallised Sky). This is also a large-scale installation, in this case featuring sound and movement. The piece originally created for the Spanish Pavilion was adapted for a permanent installation in the lobby of the Artium Museoa (the Museum of Contemporary Art of the Basque Country) in Vitoria-Gasteiz (Spain), in 2002. This coincided with a retrospective of the artist's work from the previous decade.

In 2004, the Reina Sofía National Art Museum commissioned Pérez to create an installation in the Palacio de Cristal ("Glass Palace") a 19th-century greenhouse located in the Buen Retiro Park in Madrid, which the museum uses for art installations. For this occasion, he presented Mutaciones, a large-scale work composed of three pieces — Olivo, Tempus Fugit, and Mutaciones — in which, according to the Spanish art critic Fernando Samaniego, the artist incorporated the changing light and surrounding vegetation as part of the installation.

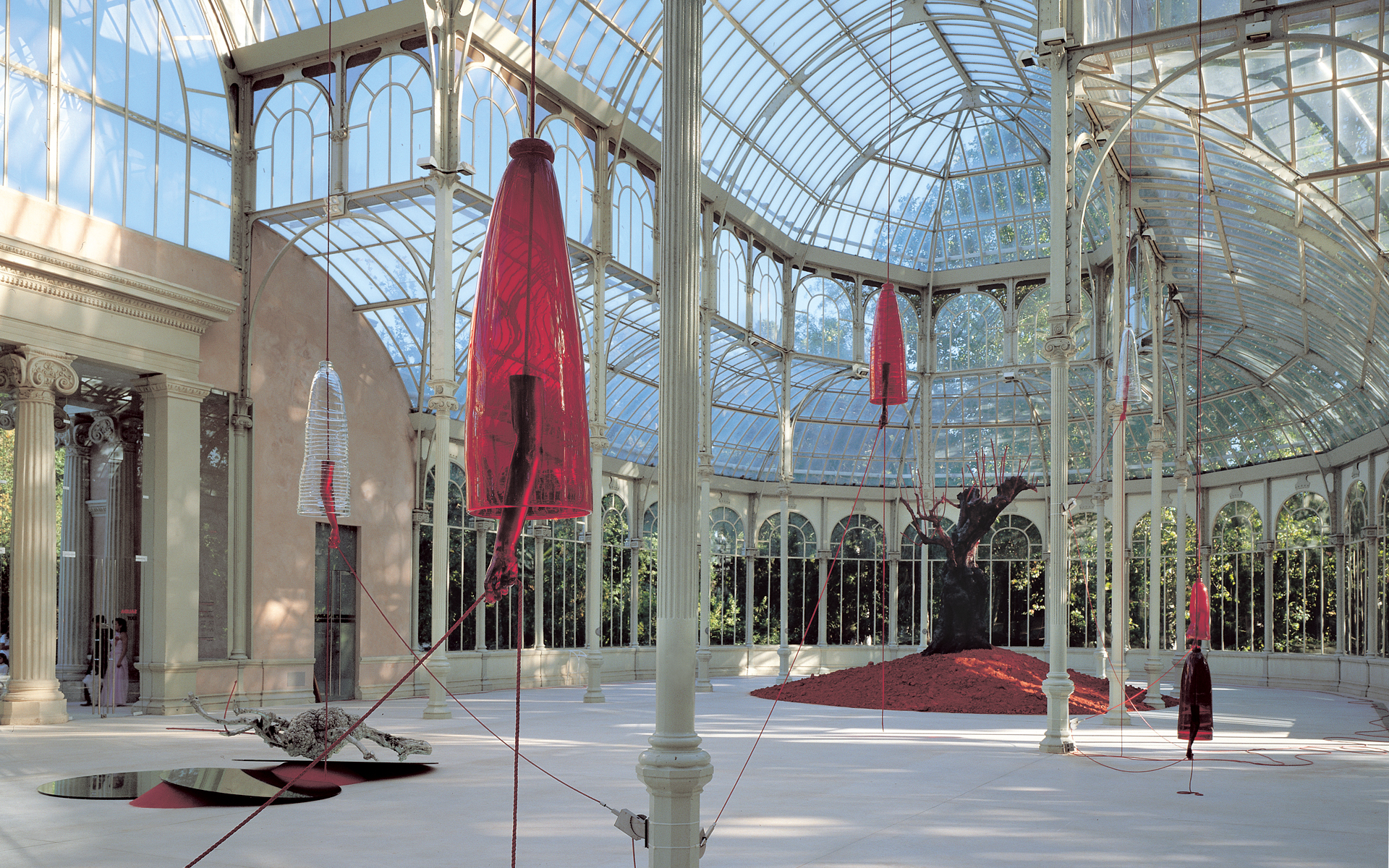
Mutaciones | Palacio de Cristal (2004)

In 2008, Pérez created Lamentaciones (Lamentations), an installation for the cloister of the Burgos Cathedral. The work consisted of seventeen large blown-glass bells suspended around the cloister. For this project, he incorporated the human voice for the first time, using a composition written specifically for the occasion by Catalan composer Joan Sanmartí. Some of the bells sounded when activated by a motorised mechanism, while others contained one of eight individually recorded voices, producing a layered polyphonic effect. The installation was accompanied by the piece Rosario (Memento Mori), composed of fifty-nine life-sized bronze human skulls arranged as the beads of a rosary.

In 2012, the Salzburg Festival commissioned Pérez to create a work in response to the premiere of Die Soldaten, an opera by German composer Bernd Alois Zimmermann. His installation El carrusel del tiempo (The Carousel of Time), presented at the Karl Böhm Saal of the Haus für Mozart, featured a motorised structure with thirty-four pairs of shoes suspended by fine threads, rotating slightly above the ground in a continuous movement that suggested an absent human presence. For historiian and Spanish curator Alfonso de la Torre: We are transported anew to another time as we contemplate this “spiral of motion that alludes to solitude, to lack of communication”

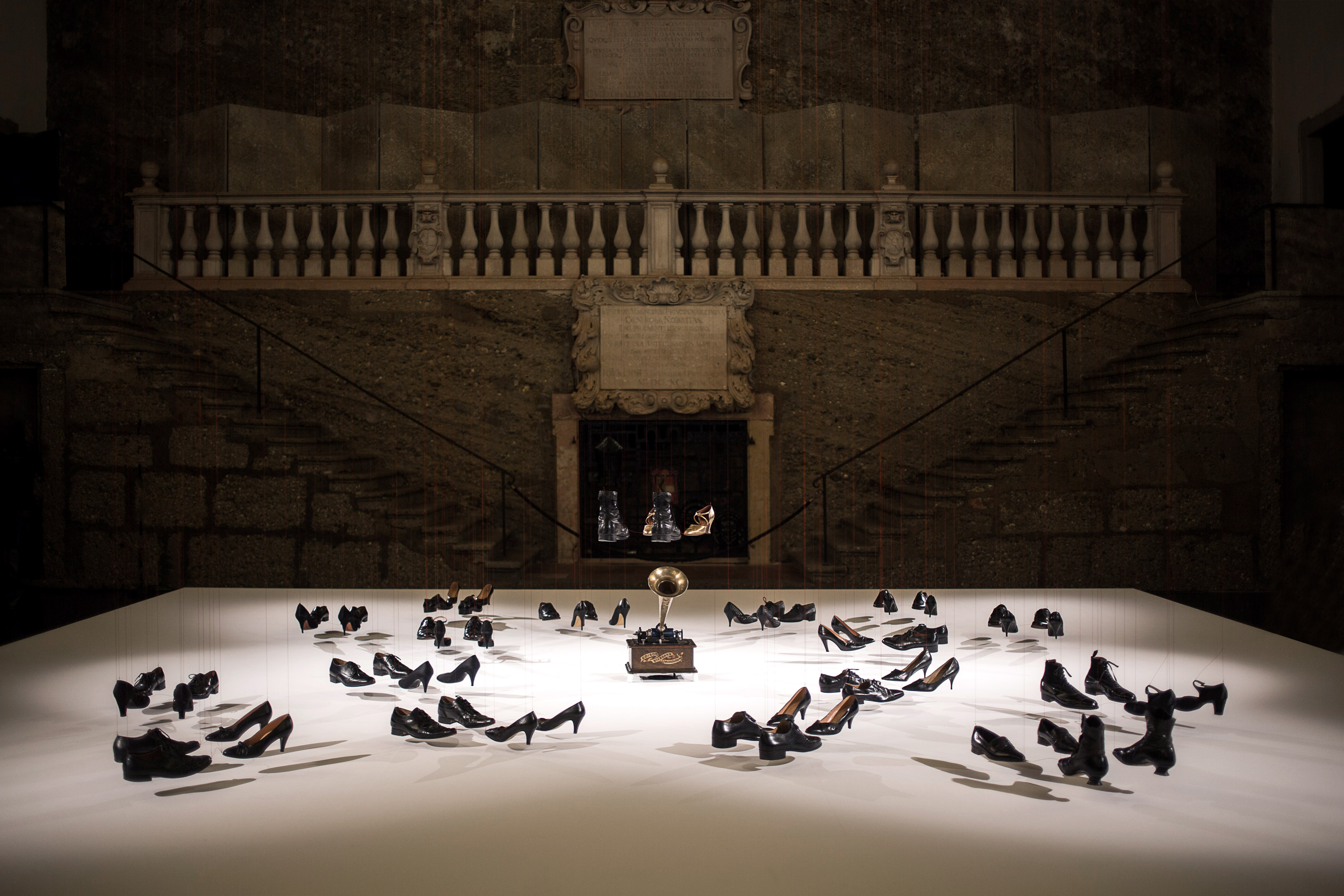
El carrusel del tiempo | Salzburg Festival (2012)

In 2022, he presented a retrospective exhibition entitled Presencias Ausencias (Presences Absences), covering the last fifteen years of the artist's career to date, at the Sala Kubo in the Kursaal Centre in San Sebastián in Spain.

Among his group exhibitions, the following are worth mentioning: El Ángel Exterminador. A Room for Spanish Contemporary Art at the Palais des Beaux-Arts in Brussels (2010), an institutional exhibition featuring contemporary Spanish artists; Glasstress at the Museum of Arts and Design in New York (2012), focused on contemporary glass art; Sections Intersection / 25 Years of the Guggenheim Museum Collection (2022), organized to mark the museum's 25th anniversary; and Lives / 10th Anniversary Exhibition at the Toyama Glass Art Museum in Japan (2025).

== Style and themes ==
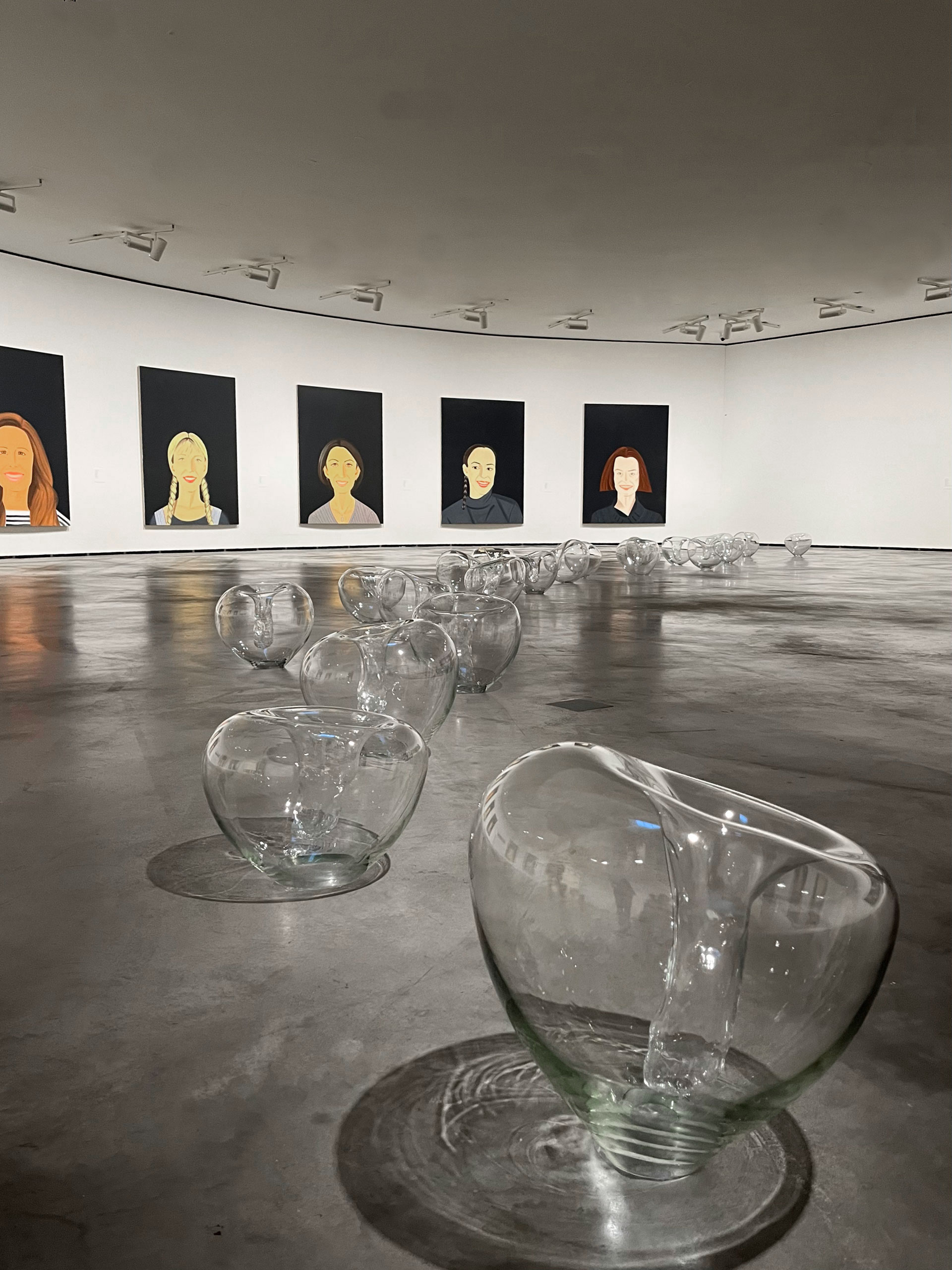
Levitas | Museum Guggenheim Bilbao (2022)

Javier Pérez's work has been described by critics as an exploration of the human condition, addressing ideas such as impermanence, temporality, biological transformation, and the fragility of the body. According to the Museo Reina Sofía in Madrid, his artistic practice moves beyond a traditional anthropocentric perspective by placing the human body in dialogue with other organisms, materials, and natural processes. His works have been interpreted as exploring tensions between concepts such as life and death, purity and corruption, and solidity and transience, often engaging with themes related to identity, memory, and the passage of time.

In a 2004 interview about his exhibition Mutaciones (Mutations) at the Museo Reina Sofía, Pérez stated:

“I like dealing with points of encounter between spirit and flesh, between purity and impurity, between beauty and horror, between attraction and repulsion. [...] The idea is to confront humanity with its own condition, and for everything that humanity finds frightening to take on an irresistible charm. The idea is for humanity to be attracted by its own viscera.

Pérez works across multiple media, including sculpture, drawing, photography, video, performance, and art installation. His use of materials ranges from organic substances such as horsehair, silk cocoons, and animal intestines—as seen in Capilares (2008), Hábito (1996), and Barroco (1996)—to fragile materials like blown glass and porcelain, featured in Carroña (2011) and Anatomía del deseo (2000). More durable materials such as bronze and marble appear in works like Anatomía del deseo (2000) and Nightmares (2017). Some installations, including La torre de sonido (1999), Aria da capo (2008), and Tango (2013), incorporate elements such as sound and movement.

Drawing has remained a constant in Pérez's career. In 2004, the Museo Reina Sofía published a monograph featuring his series Metamorfosis, composed of 53 drawings. In 2008, he produced the bibliophile edition El bebedor de lágrimas, consisting of twenty silkscreen prints accompanied by a text by Spanish writer Miguel Ángel Hernández, followed by the artist's book Somnia In Somnia, which includes thirty-three drawings. Donation Fondation Florence et Daniel Guerlain at the Centre Pompidou in Paris in 2013; and Passion for Drawing at the Albertina Museum in Vienna; in 2019;

=== Critical reception ===
Critical responses to Pérez's work have often emphasized its conceptual nature and its engagement with themes of transformation, decay, and material impermanence.

Curator Alfonso de la Torre described Pérez's practice as “more closely linked to thought than to form, creating a mysterious work — like a loss, a spark” (“más ligado al pensamiento que a las formas... como un extravío, un destello,” translated from Spanish).

The newspaper Deia characterized his installation Carroña (2011) as “a grotesque feast of crows and glass remains that transforms the notion of luxury into its opposite,” relating it to the Baroque concept of tempus fugit (in Spanish).

Art critic Francisco Calvo Serraller, writing in Babelia (El País), situated Pérez's work within a cosmology of continual transformation and metamorphosis, noting that he “has constructed a cosmography in which dying is only an episode in the infinite dance of mutations” (translated from Spanish).

The Museo Reina Sofía, in its exhibition text for Hábitos (1998), stated that Pérez's work revolves around ideas of metamorphosis and decay, using perishable materials to question the boundaries between the human and the carnal

== Public collections ==
- Centre Pompidou, Paris, France
- Museo Nacional Centro de Arte Reina Sofía, Madrid, Spain
- Guggenheim Museum Bilbao, Bilbao, Spain
- Artium Museo de Arte Contemporáneo del País Vasco, Vitoria-Gasteiz, Spain
- Museo de Bellas Artes de Bilbao, Spain
- DA2, Domus Artium 2002, Salamanca, Spain
- Speed Art Museum, Louisville, USA
- Tenerife Espacio de las Artes, Tenerife, Spain
- Toyama Glass Art Museum, Toyama, Japan
- Corning Museum of Glass, New York, USA
- Würth Collection, Künzelsau, Germany
- Es Baluard Museu d'Art Contemporani, Palma de Mallorca, Spain
- New York Public Library, Nueva York, USA
- Mirabaud Contemporary Art Collection, Geneva, Switzerland
- Museum of Contemporary Art, Krakow, Poland
- Musée d’Art Moderne et Contemporain de Strasbourg, France
- Musée Réattu, Arles, France
- Fonds National d’Art Contemporain, Puteaux, France

== Awards and recognition ==
- Gure Artea Award 98, granted by the Basque Government. Spain in 1998
- Critical Eye Award by Radio Nacional España in 1998
- Represented Spain, 49th Venice Biennale, Italy in 2001
- Nomination for the Drawing Prize of the Contemporary Art Foundation Daniel et Florence Guerlain France in 2007
- Ciutat de Palma Antoni Gelabert Prize for Plastic Arts, Palma de Mallorca, Spain in 2008.
- Ercilla Award, FIG Bilbao Art Fair, Spain in 2014.

== Bibliography ==
- LOISY, Jean de; BLANCH, Teresa; ÁLVAREZ REYES, Juan Antonio, eds. (2004). Mutaciones Metamorfosis (multilingual ed.). Madrid (Spain): Museo Nacional Centro de Arte Reina Sofía. p. 268. ISBN 84-8026-246-X.
- NÈVE, Kathy de; TORRE, Alfonso de la, eds. (2022). Javier Pérez. Presence Absence (multilingual ed.). Eke (Belgium): Ludion Publisher. p. 268. ISBN 978-94-9303-974-2.
- VIAR, Javier, ed. (2017). Historia del arte vasco. De la guerra civil a nuestros días (History of Basque art. From the civil war to the present day) (in Spanish ed.). Bilbao (Spain): Bilbao Fine Arts Museum. pp. 1027–1042. ISBN 978-84-96763-71-5.
- BLANCH, Teresa, ed. (2008). The Guggenheim Museum Bilbao Collection. Bilbao (Spain): Guggenheim Bilbao. pp. 344–351. ISBN 978-84-95216-60-1.
- DOCTOR, Rafael, ed. (2013). Arte Contemporáneo Español (Contemporáry Spanish Art) (in Spanish ed.). Madrid (Spain): La Fábrica. p. 365. ISBN 978-84-15691-16-7.
