= Carlota Ferrer =

- Born: 1976 (age 49–50); El Escorial, Spain
- Education: RESAD
- Occupations: Theater director, actress, choreographer
- Awards: Critical Eye Award (2015); Premio Max (2015)

Carlota Ferrer (born 1976) is a Spanish theater director, actress, and choreographer.

== Biography ==
Carlota Ferrer was born in El Escorial in 1976.

She is a multidisciplinary artist, actress, stage director, assistant director, choreographer, and acting coach.

A devoted follower of Metrópolis, TVE2's arts and culture program, she began imitating local people and inventing characters from a young age, which she then performed for family and friends. She started dancing as well, and although she had already dabbled in theater in El Escorial, in her final year of high school she decided to study acting at the Teatro de la Danza in San Sebastián de los Reyes, as well as contemporary dance. Later, she enrolled at RESAD, where she earned a degree in stage direction and dramaturgy. She combined her directing studies with an acting career at the Teatro de La Abadía in Madrid.

At La Abadía, she has been assistant director to José Luis Gómez, Krystian Lupa, and Àlex Rigola, and has acted in Al final todos nos encontraremos, Me acordaré de todos vosotros, and Ubú rey. Her last acting role was at the 2011 Venice Biennale workshops in the play Slow Lie, directed by Jan Lauwers.

In 2015, she was one of the creators of LaZonaKubik, an initiative with which the production company Lazona and the Kubik Fabrik theater aimed to revolutionize the creation and production model of alternative theater. Ferrer worked on the play Fortune Cookie, whose central theme is the prophecies and proverbs that appear on Chinese fortune cookies.

In 2017, she was appointed artistic director of the Corral de comedias de Alcalá de Henares. In its 2018-2019 season she premiered Esto no es La casa de Bernarda Alba (This is Not The House of Bernarda Alba), a three-way adaptation of the classic play, performed by men in female roles, seeking to break down gender barriers and paying homage to Federico García Lorca.

In 2019, she was appointed director of the Madrid Autumn Festival. However, she was dismissed from the role that December. The regional government's Department of Culture stated that the move was "mutually agreed", but Ferrer later characterized it as "a unilateral political decision."

== Awards ==
- Critical Eye Award (2015)
- Premio Max (2015)
