= Pablo Sáinz Villegas =

Spanish classical guitarist (born 1977)

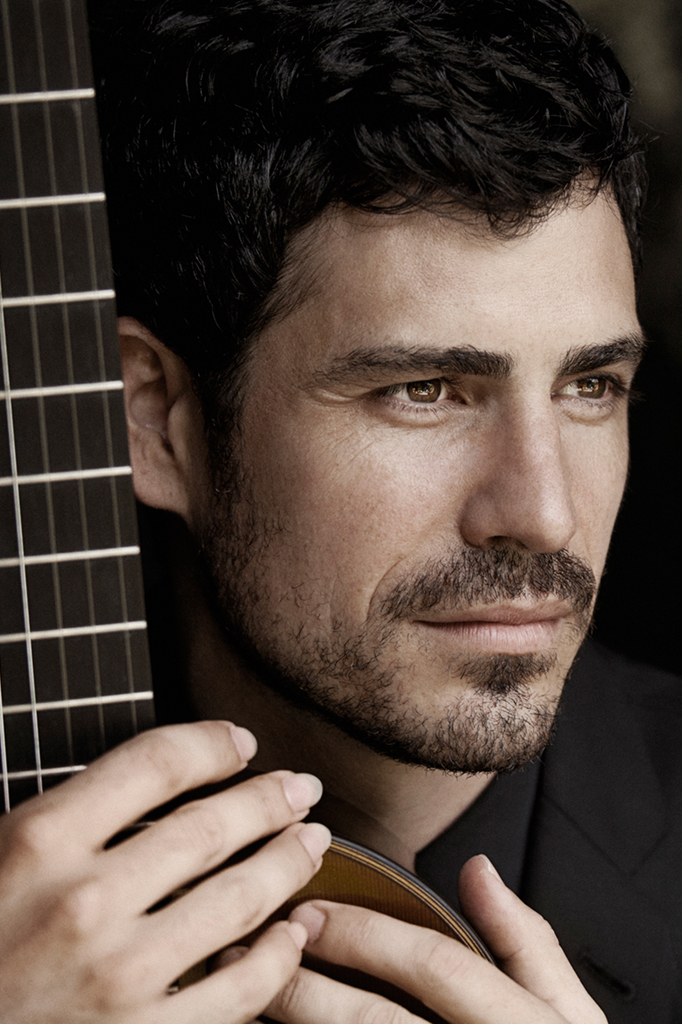
- Villegas in 2015
- Born: 16 June 1977 (age 49); Logroño, Old Castile, Spain
- Education: La Rioja Conservatory; Madrid Royal Conservatory; University of Music Franz Liszt Weimar; Manhattan School of Music
- Occupation: Classical guitarist
- Years active: c. 2001 – present
- Awards: Critical Eye Award (2008)
- Website: pablosainzvillegas.com

Pablo Sáinz Villegas (born 16 June 1977) is a Spanish classical guitarist.

Born in Logroño, currently in La Rioja, Villegas began his musical studies there before going on to an international career. Among his awards was the 2008 Critical Eye Award in classical music. In 2018, he was signed by the Sony Classical label, his first recording for which was Volver with Plácido Domingo, a collection of Iberian and Latin American songs; the production also involved arranger conductor and pianist Nazareno Andorno.

Villegas has been based in New York City since 2001.

== Discography ==
- 2004: Guitar Recital
- 2013: Histoire du Tango - with Augustin Hadelich
- 2015: Americano
- 2018: Volver – with Placido Domingo (Sony Classical)
- 2020: Soul of Spanish Guitar (Sony Classical)
- 2023: The Blue Album (Sony Classical)
