= Alberto Peral =

Basque artist (born 1966)

Alberto Peral (born 1966, Santurtzi, Biscay) is a Basque artist. He began to highlight in the principle of the 90s. Since his first individual exhibition at the Fundació Joan Miró in Barcelona in 1992, he has created a conceptual route that has brought him to move through a big diversity of mediums, like drawing, photography or sculpture.

== Solo exhibits ==
Selection

- 2011 - Múltiples, Espacio Marzana, Bilbao
- 2010 - Red, Arco 2010, Madrid
- 2007 - Bailando, Museo Reina Sofia, Madrid
- 2006 - Time, Galería Helga de Alvear, Madrid
- 2005 - Estrechamientos, Sala Carlos III, University of Navarra, Pamplona
- 2004 - El cuerpo sutil, Galeria Senda, Barcelona
- 2003 - Cuatro Montañas, Galeria Helga de Alvear, Madrid
- 2000 - Paisaje (amb Jesús Palomino), Espai cúbic, Fundació Pilar i Joan Miró, Palma
- 1997 - Rotadores, Centre Cultural Tecla Sala (L'Hospitalet de Llobregat) and Sala Rekalde, Bilbao
- 1992 - Superficie (with Ana Laura Alaez), Espai 13, Fundació Joan Miró
