= Mercedes Ferrer =

Spanish singer-songwriter (born 1963)

Mercedes Ferrer (Madrid, 1963) is a Spanish singer-songwriter, active since 1983.

She studied modern literature in the Sorbonne.

Influenced by The Doors, Bob Dylan and David Bowie, she played in several French bands until she went back to Madrid in 1984, during La Movida Madrileña. She met Carlos Torero and more musicians and they founded the group La llave, which won VIII trofeo rock Villa de Madrid in 1985 and was a support band of The Cure.

She later began a solo career during which she has met Yoko Ono and Nacho Cano, who composed the famous song "Vivimos siempre juntos" ("We Always Lived Together"), which was a No.1 hit in Spain in 1996. In the early 1990s, she lived in New York and went back to Madrid in 1993. She has participated in several artistic events, like a tribute to John Lennon and a concert for the victims of 2004 Madrid train bombings.

== Discography ==
- Entre mi sombra y yo, 1986
- Tengo todas las calles, 1988
- Imán, 1991
- Tiempo futuro, 1994
- Generaciones, 1997
- Tiempo real, 2003
- Intermedio (1986–2006), 2006
- Travesía, 2009
