= Artium Museum =

Contemporary art museum in Vitoria-Gasteiz, Spain

- ARTIUM
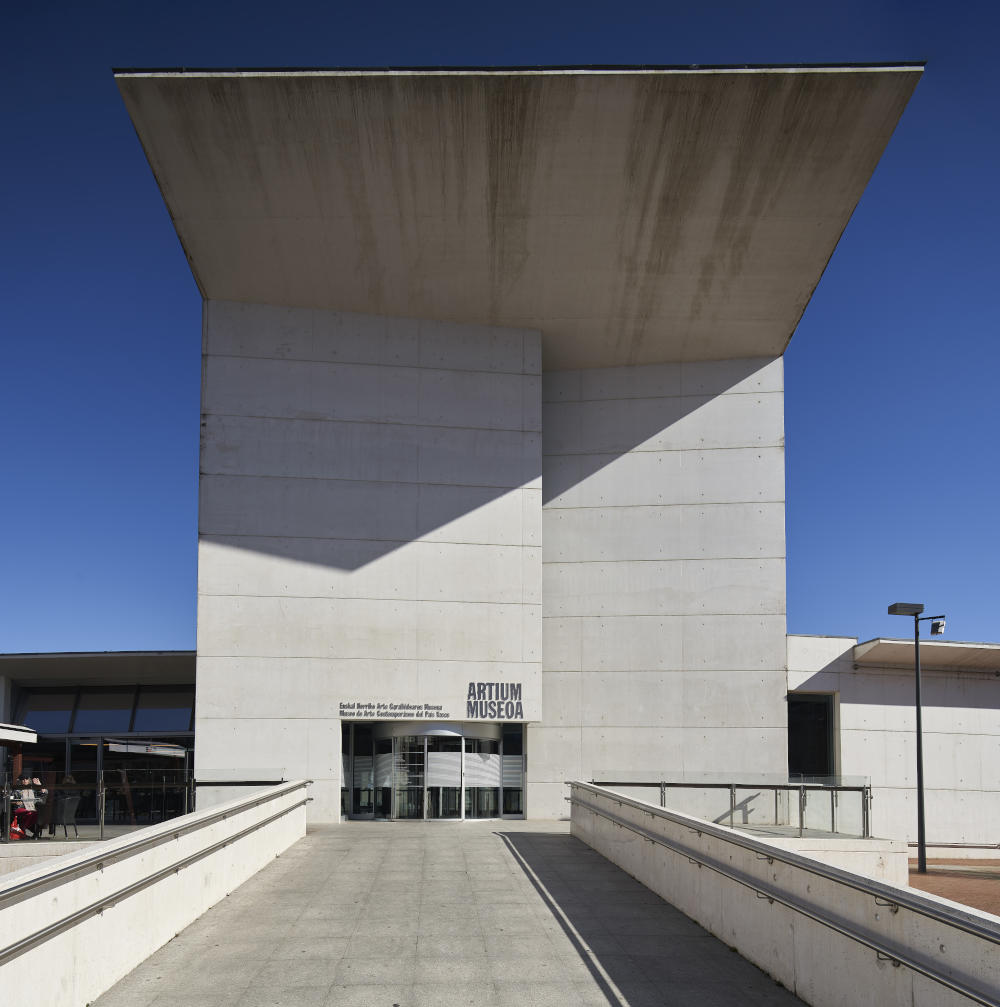
- Interactive map of the Artium Museum area

General information
- Status: Completed
- Type: Museum
- Architectural style: Modern
- Location: Vitoria-Gasteiz, Álava, Spain
- Coordinates: 42°51′N 2°41′W
- Elevation: 525 m (1,722 ft)
- Opened: 26 April 2002
- Owner: Provincial Council of Álava

Design and construction
- Architect: José Luis Caton

Website
- www.artium.eus/en/visit/opening-hours-ticket-prices

The Museum of Contemporary Art of the Basque Country-Artium Museoa is a contemporary art museum located in Vitoria-Gasteiz, the capital of the province of Álava in northern Spain. It opened in 2002 and is housed in a former bus station.

As of 2022, the curator of the Museum is Catarina Lozano.

The Museum holds works by numerous artists, including Miquel Barceló, Joseph Beuys, Joan Brossa, Juan Francisco Casas, Jake and Dinos Chapman, Eduardo Chillida, Salvador Dalí, Óscar Domínguez, Manolo Millares, Joan Miró, Juan Muñoz, Jorge Oteiza, Pablo Palazuelo, Javier Pérez, Pablo Picasso, Antonio Saura, Antoni Tàpies, Juan Uslé, and Darío Villalba.

The museum lobby features Un pedazo de cielo cristalizado (A Piece of Crystallized Sky) by Basque artist Javier Pérez.

The building is located in the centre of Vitoria-Gasteiz on Francia Street.

== Gallery ==
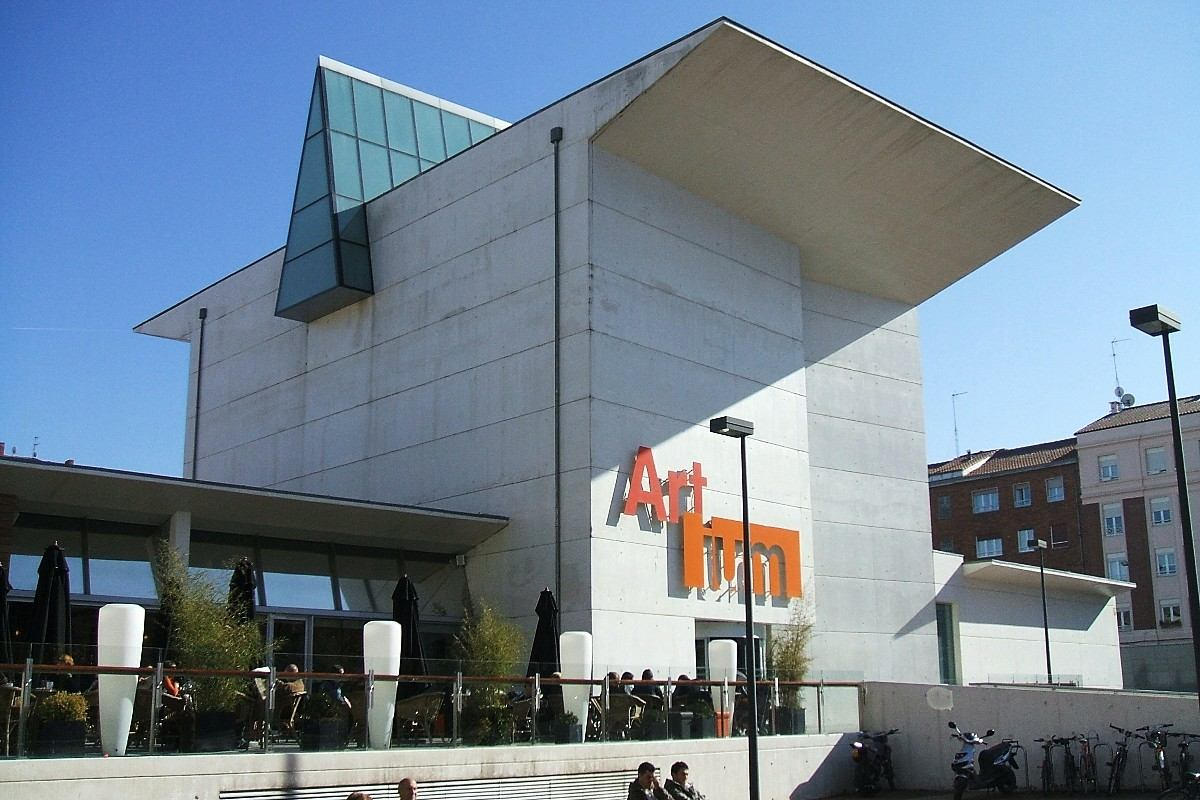
Outdoors

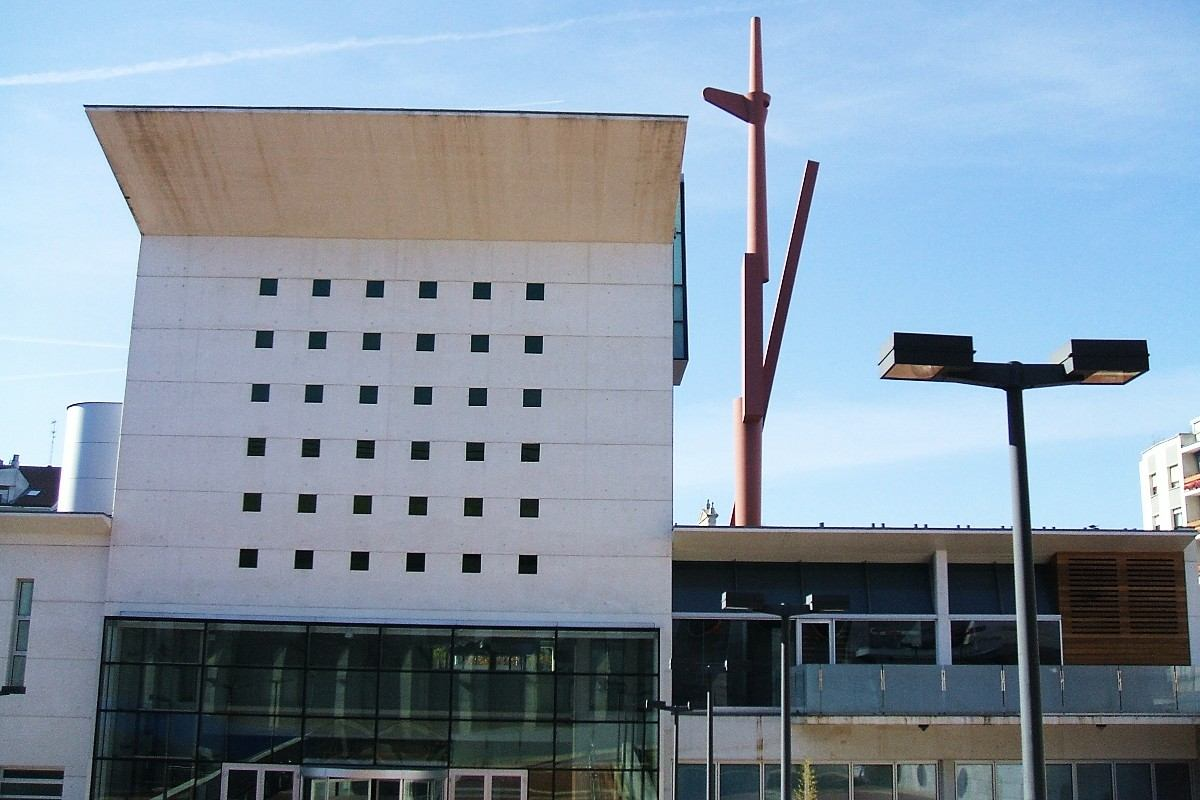
Outdoors

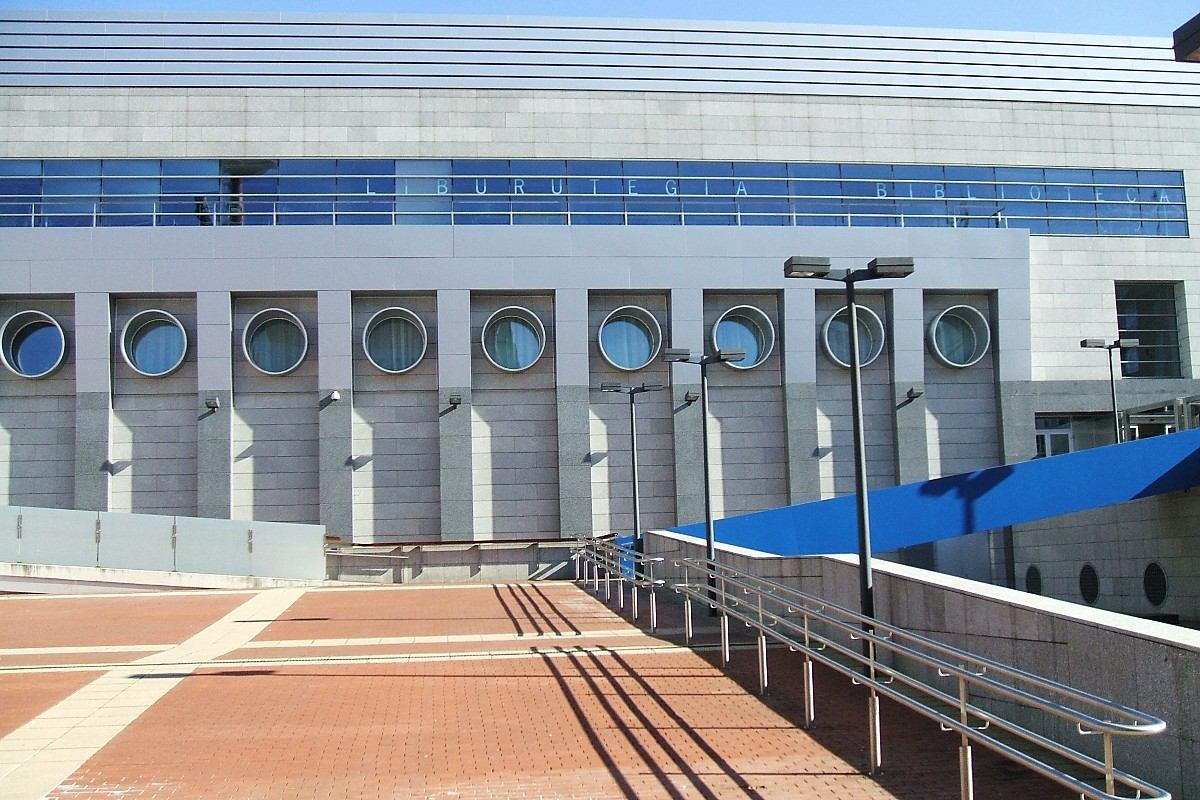
Outdoors

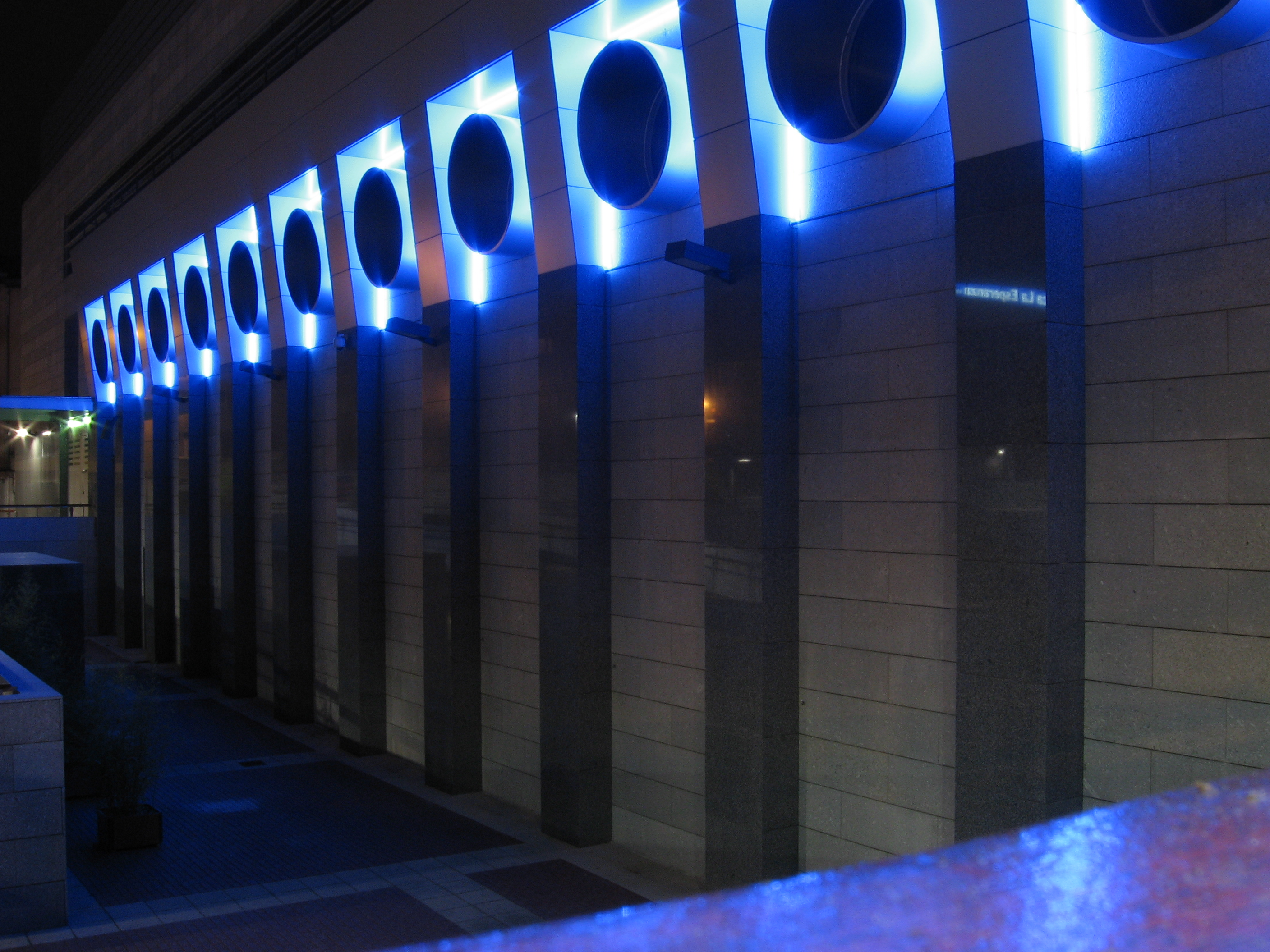
Outdoors at night

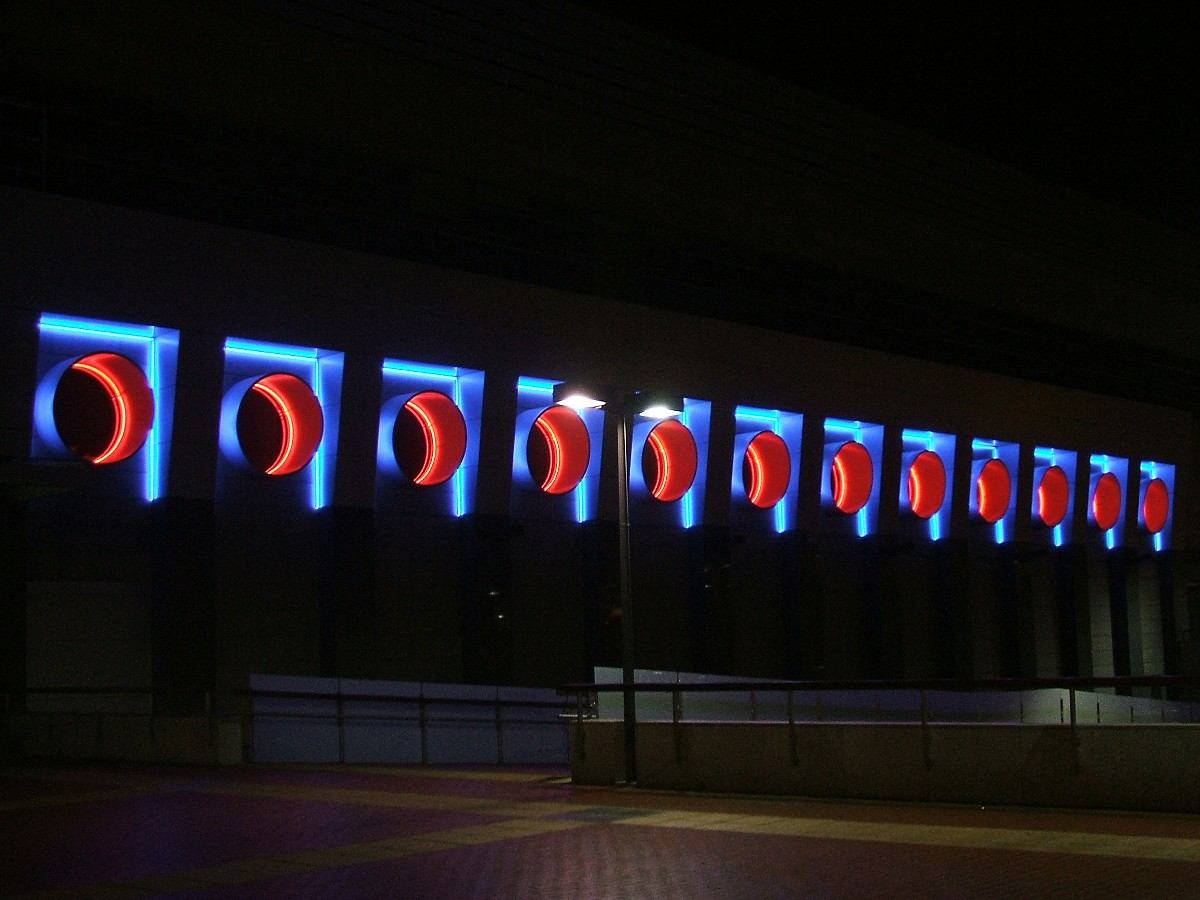
Outdoors at night

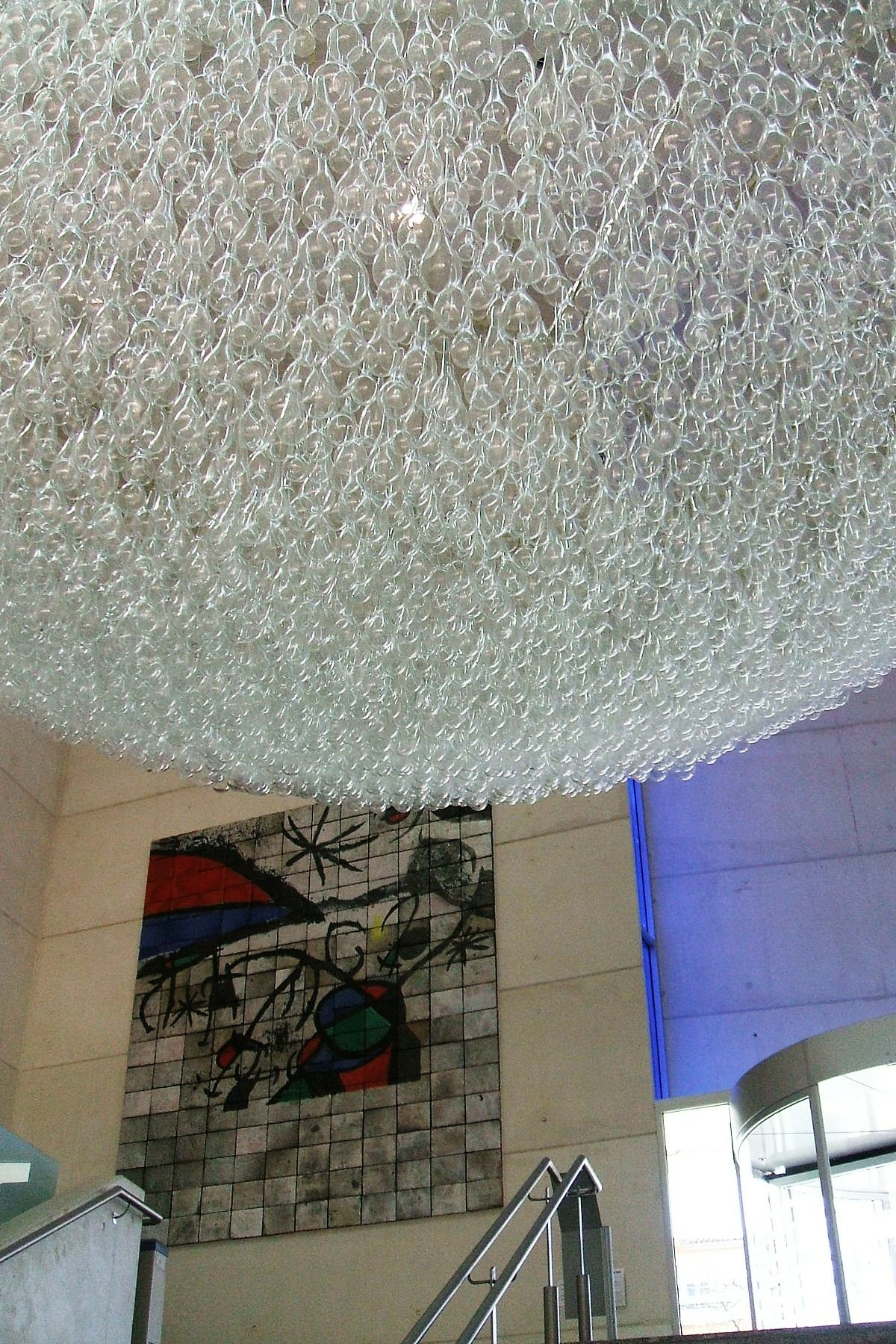
Portal

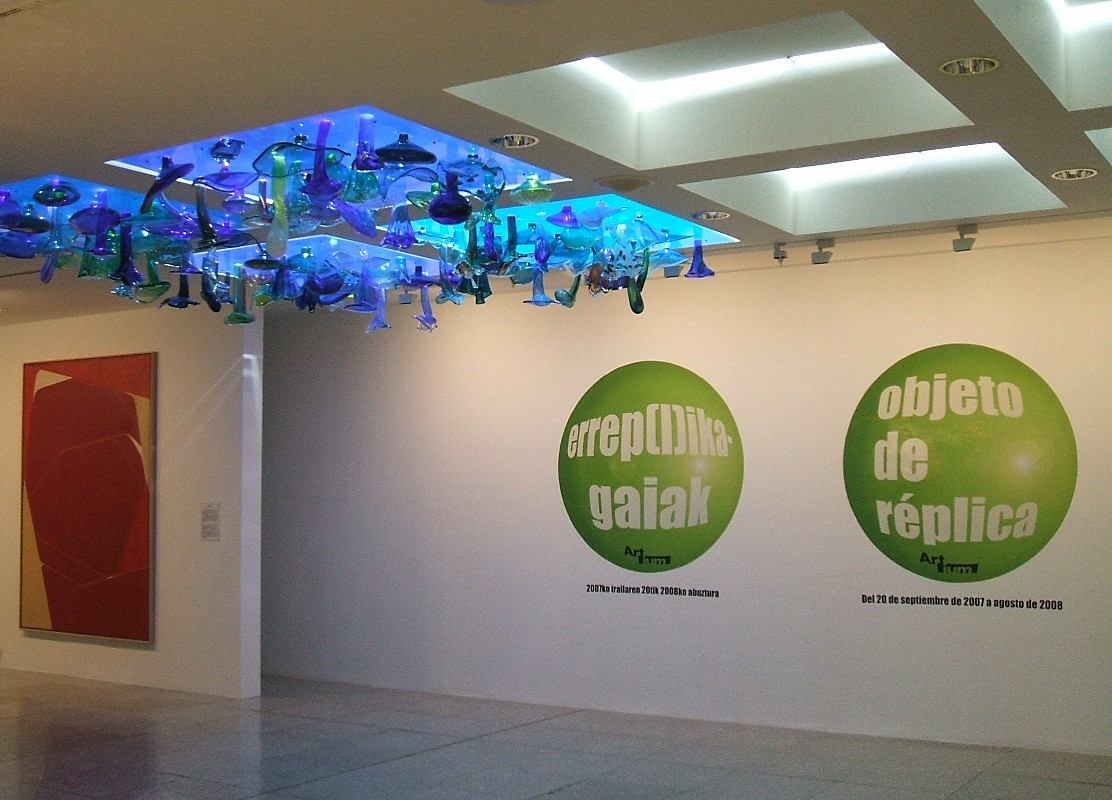
Indoors

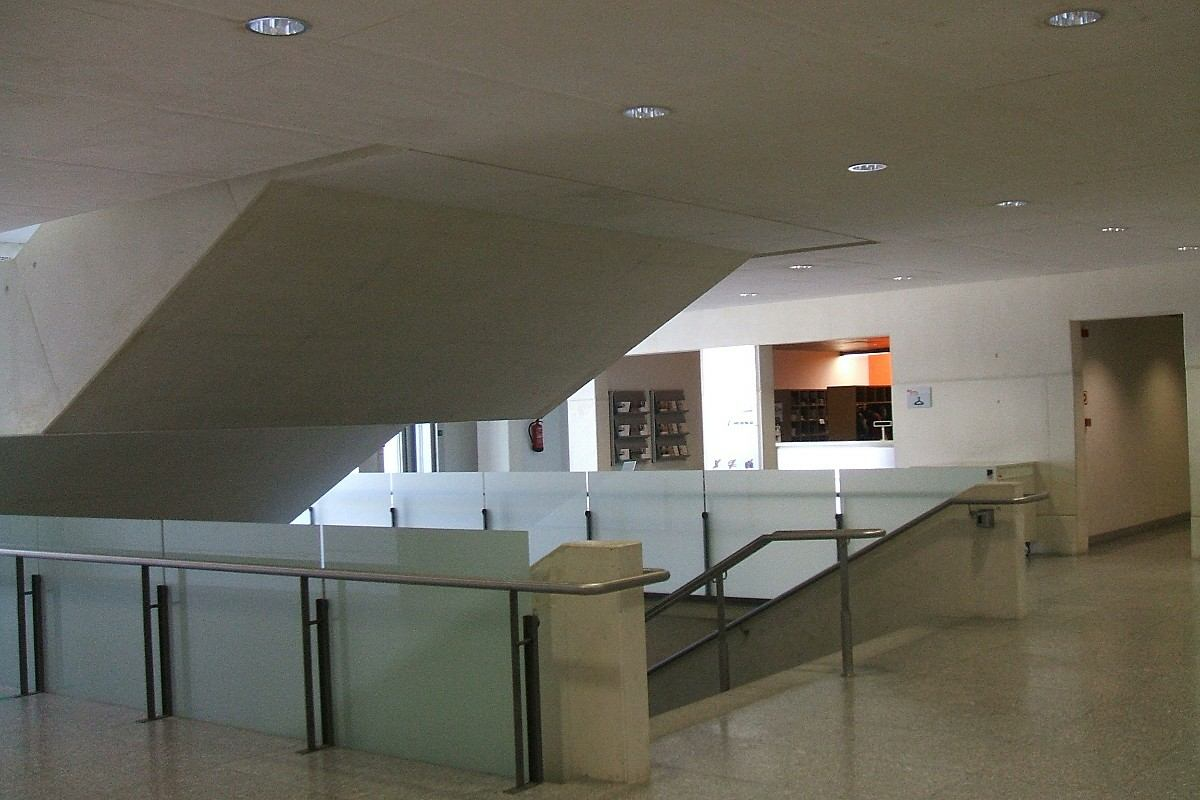
Indoors

== See also ==
- Basque Country (autonomous community)
