= Use Lahoz =

Spanish writer of Historical Fiction

Use Lahoz (Barcelona, 1976) is a Spanish writer of fiction. He has lived in many countries for study or work, including Portugal, Germany, Italy, Uruguay, Cuba and France, where he works as a teacher at the Paris Institute of Political Studies. He is a regular contributor to Radio Nacional de España and El País, as well as other national and Latin American media. His journalistic work has been awarded with the Pica d’Estats Prize in 2011.

He made his debut as a novelist with Leer del revés (El Cobre, 2005), which featured at the Festival du Premier Roman de Chambèry (France). In 2009, he published Los Baldrich (Alfaguara), which was applauded by critics and readers alike. His third novel La estación perdida (Alfaguara, 2011), won the Premio Ojo Crítico in 2012. He ventured into juvenile literature with his book Volverán a por mí (La Galera, 2012), co-authored with Josan Hatero. The book won the Premio La Galera Jóvenes Lectores in 2011.

Lahoz's novel El año en que me enamoré de todas won the prestigious Premio Primavera de Novela in 2013.

His 2016 novel Los Buenos amigos was reviewed as a positive example of literary realism.

In November 2019 he published Jauja, which was reviewed by critics as «A formidable novel with Chekhovian echoes» or «A novel from which you cannot stray for an instant». Jauja was chosen as one of the books of the year in the literary supplement Artes & Letras.

== Bibliography ==
- Leer del revés (El Cobre, 2005)
- Los Baldrich (Alfaguara, 2009)
- La estación perdida (Alfaguara, 2011)
- Volverán a por mí (La Galera, 2012, escrita junto a Josan Hatero)
- El año en que me enamoré de todas (Espasa, 2013)
- Los buenos amigos (Destino, 2016)
- Corazón de robot (MAD Libro, 2017, escrita junto a Andrés Rubio)
- París (Tintablanca, 2019)
- Jauja (Destino, 2019)
- Verso suelto (Destino, 2023)
