= Gordoncillo =

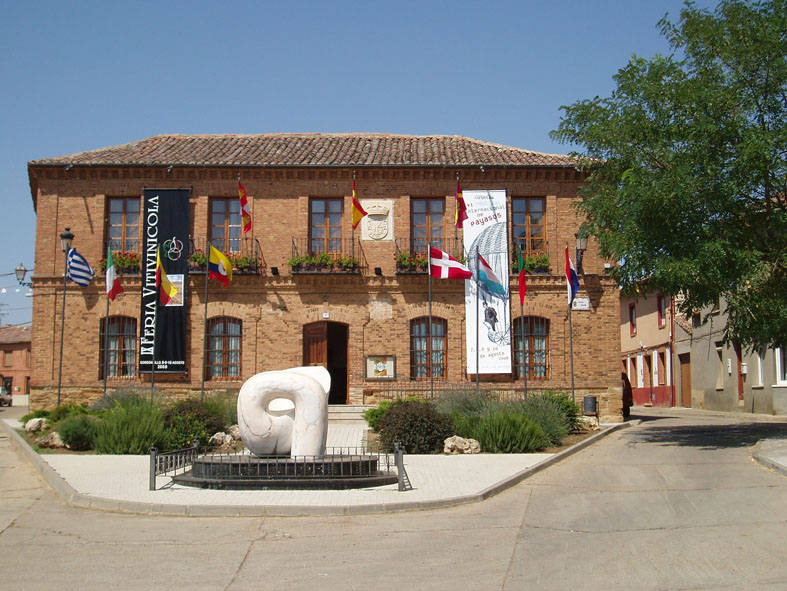
- Town hall

- Flag Coat of arms

- Location within Spain
- Coordinates: 42°8′3″N 5°24′10″W
- Country: Spain
- Autonomous community: Castile and León
- Province: León
- Municipality: Gordoncillo

Government
  - Mayor: Urbano Seco Vallinas (PSOE)

Area
  - Total: 23.36 km^{2} (9.02 sq mi)
- Elevation: 747 m (2,451 ft)

Population (2025-01-01)
  - Total: 312
  - Density: 13.4/km^{2} (34.6/sq mi)
- Demonym: gordoncillense
- Time zone: UTC+1 (CET)
  - Summer (DST): UTC+2 (CEST)
- Postal Code: 24294
- Telephone prefix: 987
- Climate: Csb
- Website: Ayto. de Gordoncillo

Gordoncillo (Spanish pronunciation: [ɡoɾðonˈθiʎo]; Leonese: Gordonciellu), is a municipality located in the province of León, Castile and León, Spain. At the time of the 2025 census (INE), the municipality had a population of 312 inhabitants.

It is well known for its Tierra de León (D.O) wines.
