= Gonzalo Torné =

Spanish writer

Gonzalo Torné is a Spanish writer. He was born in Barcelona in 1976. He has published three novels: Hilos de sangre (2010; winner of Premio Jaén de Novela), Divorcio en el aire (2013), and Años felices (2017). He has also written a literary study titled Tres maestros (2012) where he analyzes the works of Saul Bellow, V. S. Naipaul and Javier Marías. As a translator, he has translated Samuel Johnson, William Wordsworth and John Ashbery into Spanish. His own works have been translated into multiple European languages, including English, French, Italian, German, Dutch, Portuguese and Catalan.

He lives in Barcelona.
