= Cuartel del Conde-Duque =

- Cuartel del Conde-Duque (Spanish)
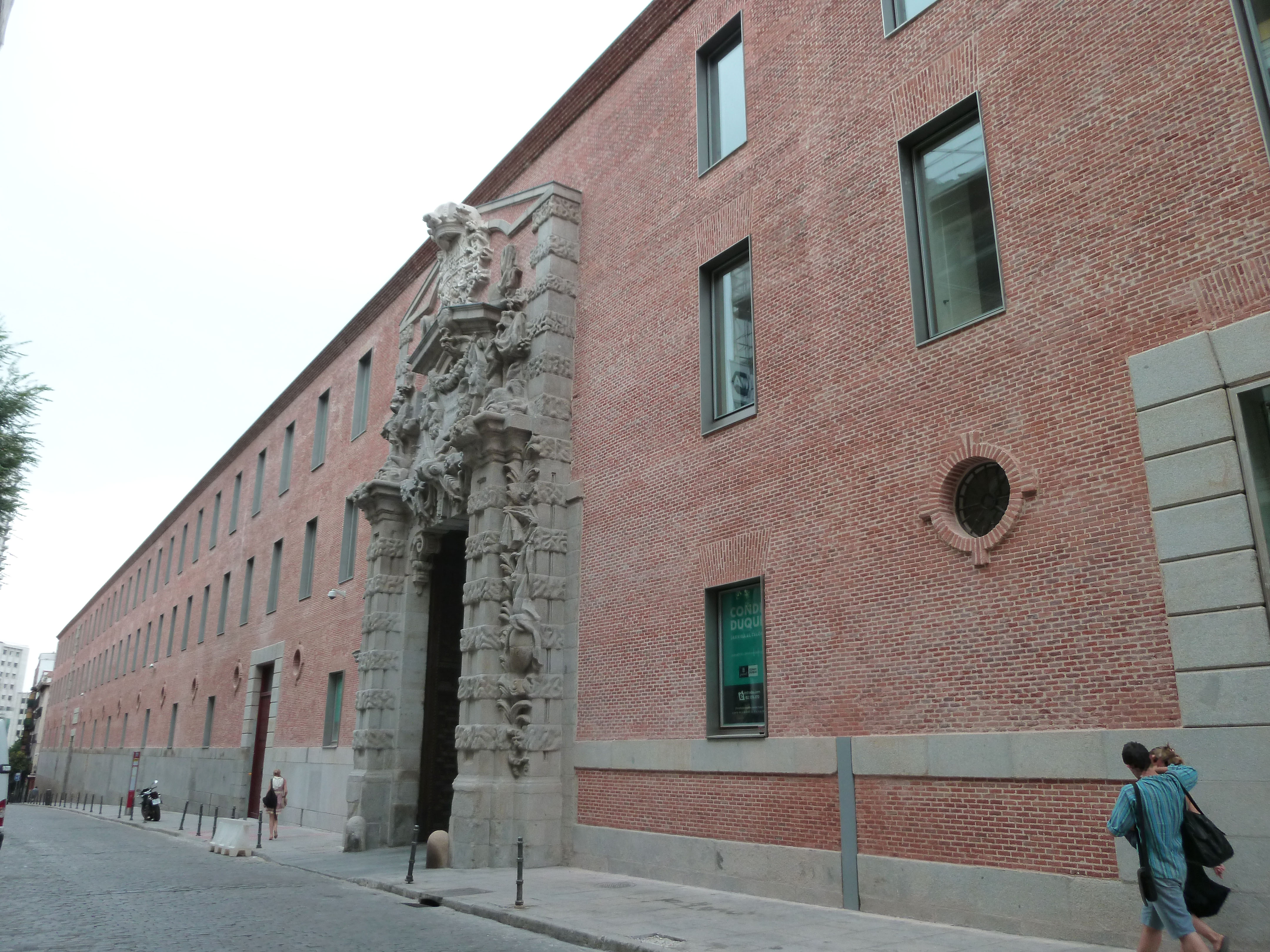

- Location within Spain
- 40.427852°N 3.710681°W
- Location: Madrid, Spain

Spanish Cultural Heritage
- Official name: Cuartel del Conde-Duque
- Type: Non-movable
- Criteria: Monument
- Designated: 1976
- Reference no.: RI-51-0004215

The Cuartel del Conde-Duque (Spanish: Cuartel del Conde-Duque) is a building located in Madrid, Spain. It was declared Bien de Interés Cultural in 1976. It was used by the military up until 1969. It officially became an art center in 1983 and a contemporary art museum in 2001.

== Gallery ==
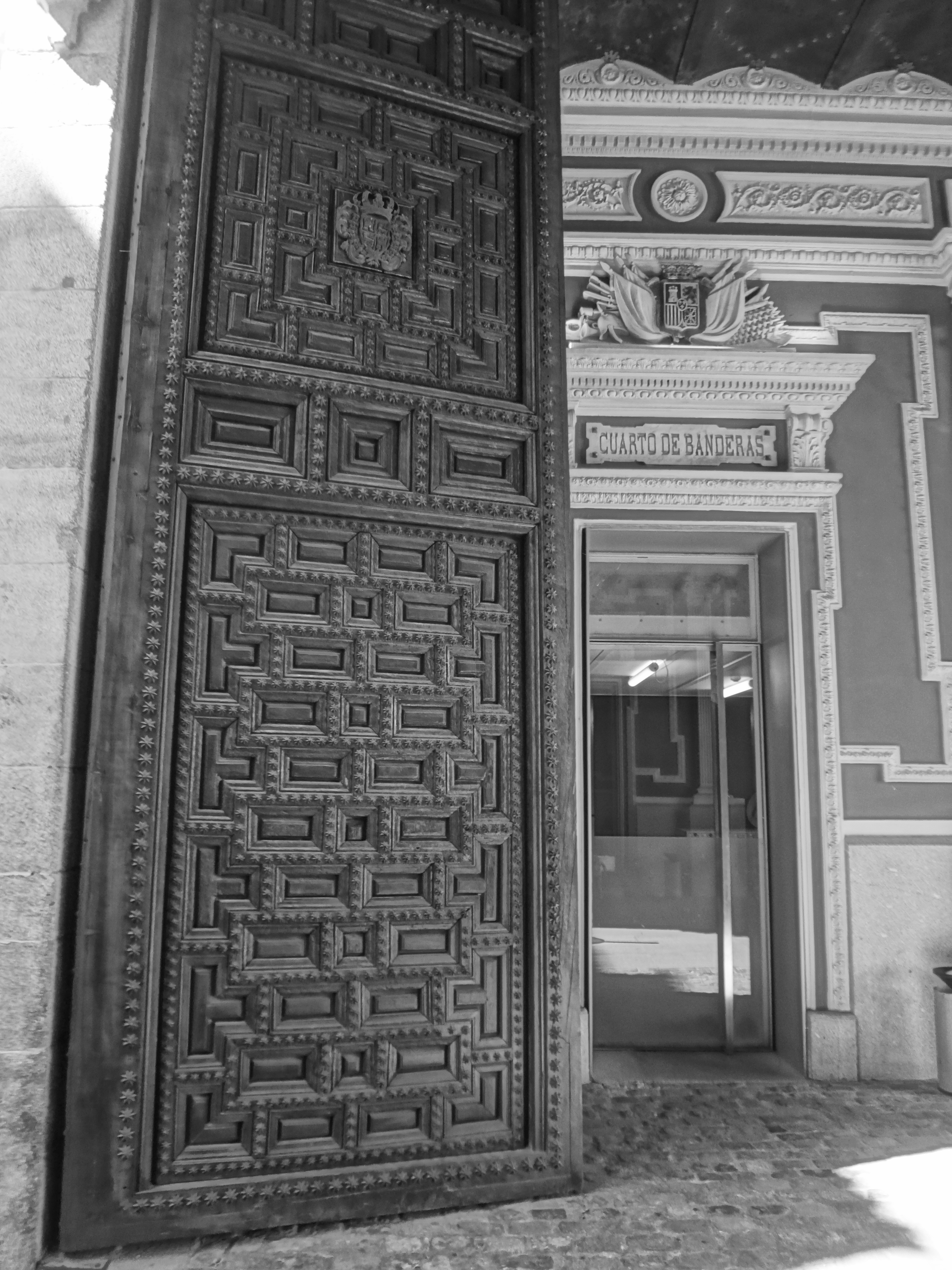
Entrance

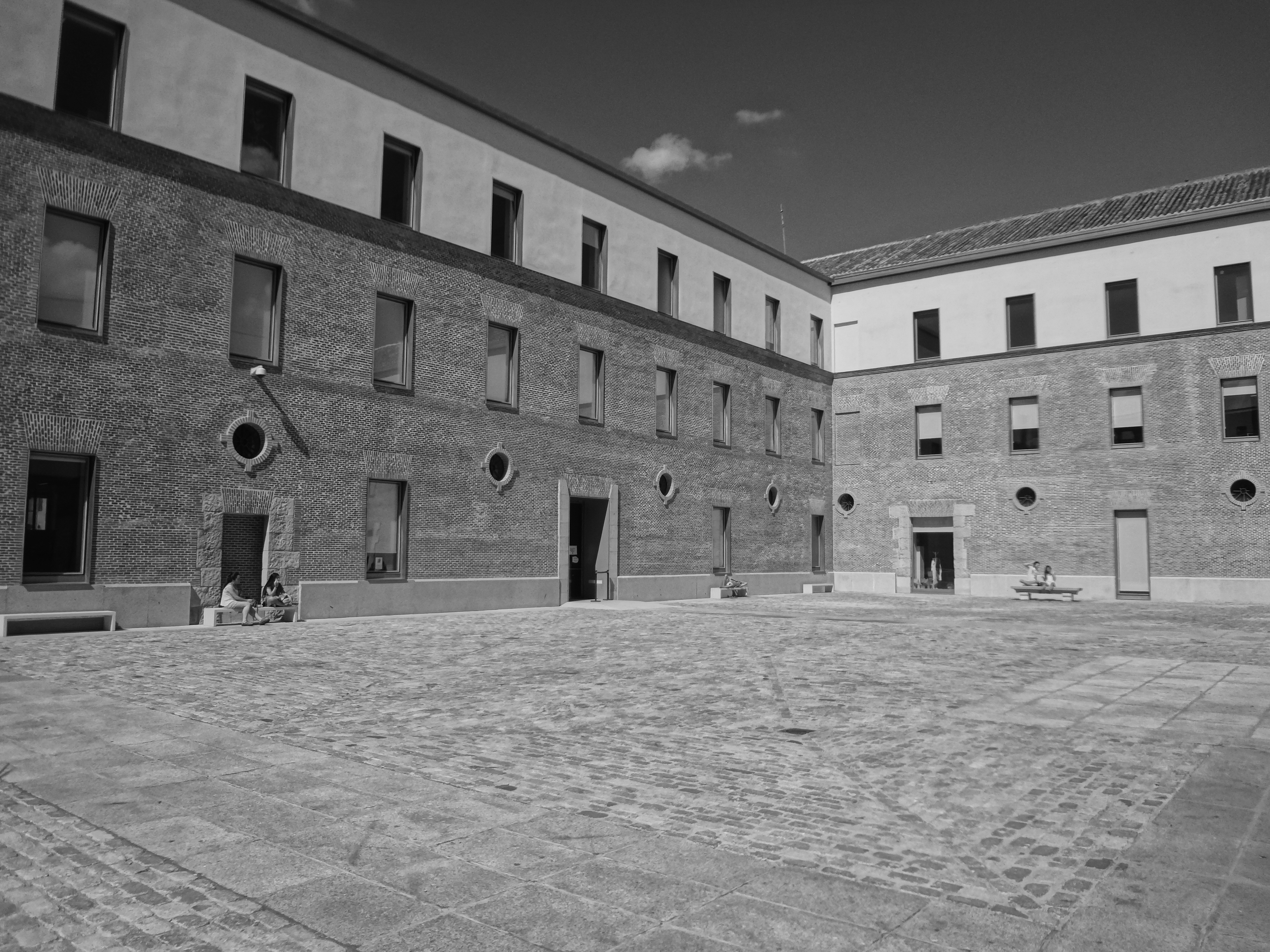
Courtyard

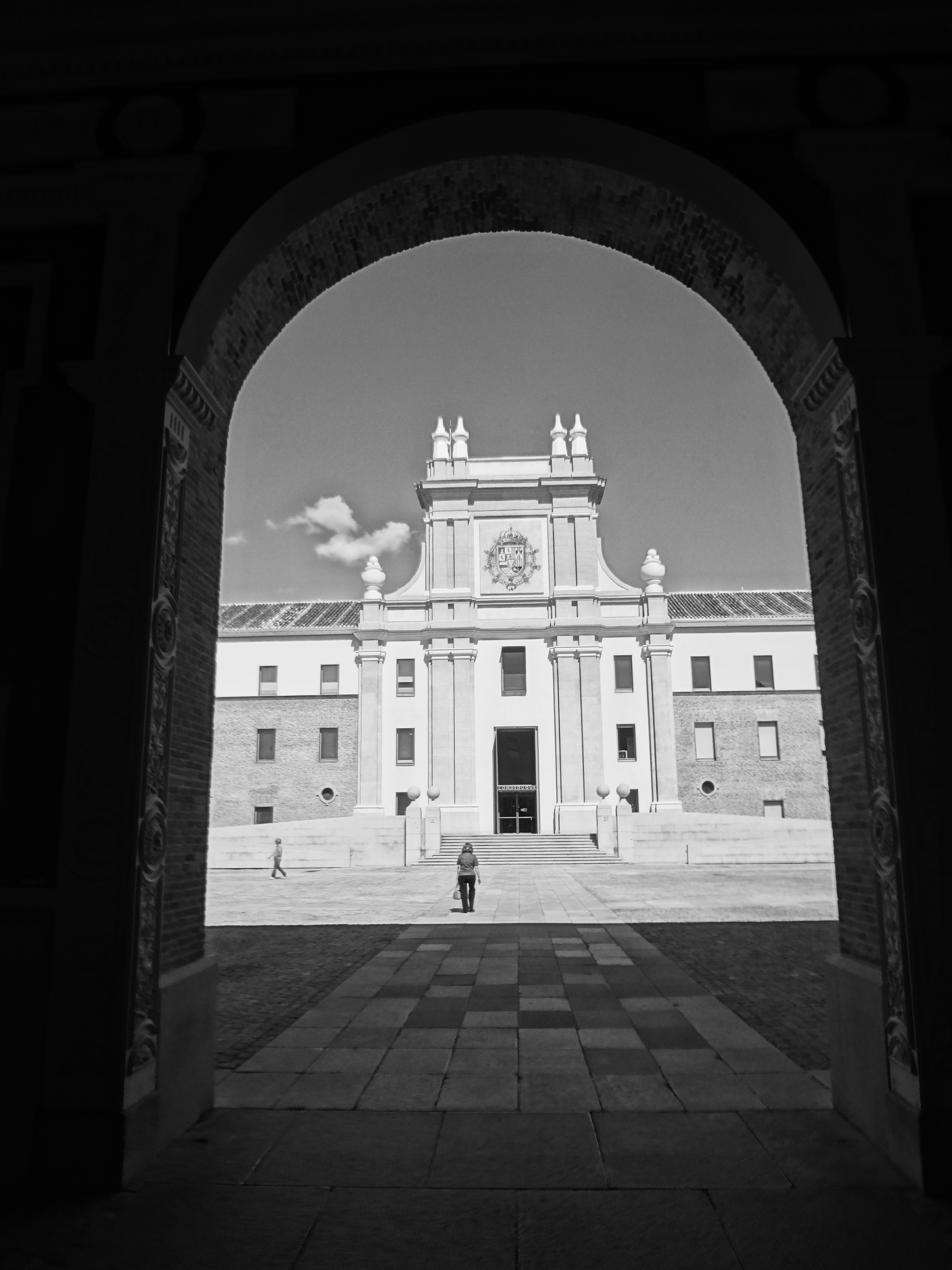
Main Building, viewed thru the entrance

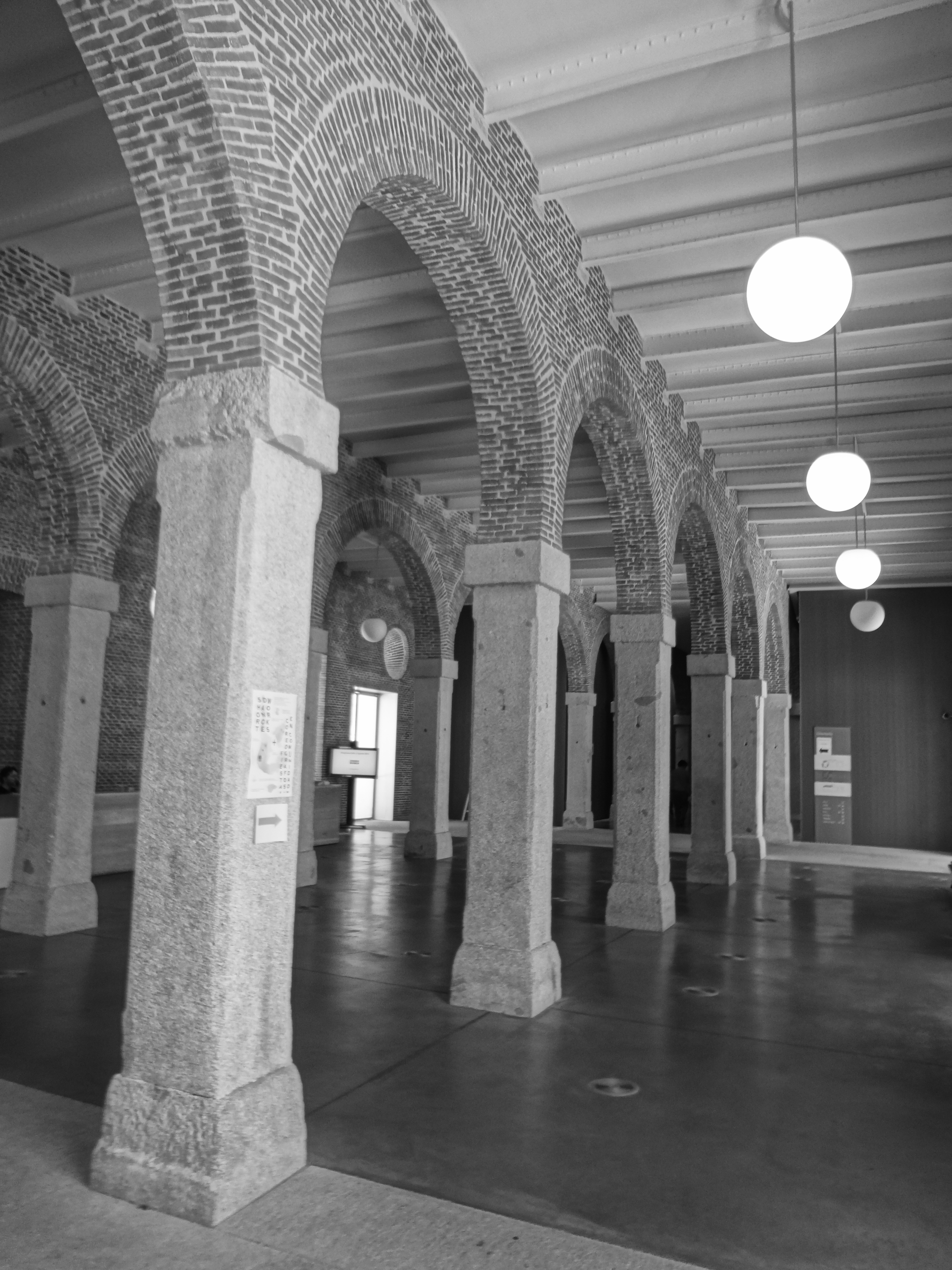
Interior
