= Musicology in Cuba =

Throughout the years, the Cuban nation has developed a wealth of musicological material created by numerous investigators and experts on this subject.

== Early 20th century ==
Apart from the work of some authors who provided information about the music in Cuba during the 19th century, that was usually included in chronicles covering a more general subject, the first investigations and studies specifically dedicated to the musical art and practice did not appear in Cuba until the beginning of the 20th century.

At that time, musicological research and documentation in Cuba was not undertaken by professionals fully dedicated to that subject, but instead it was conducted by historians, ethnologists or composers such as polymath Fernando Ortiz (b. 1881) or composer Eduardo Sánchez de Fuentes (b. 1874). The controversy sustained by these distinguished personalities in reference to the possible African (or indigenous) roots of Cuban music spanned several decades, from the 1930s to the 1950s.

Another important personality, María Muñoz (b. 1886), a Galician pianist, professor and choir conductor that graduated at the Madrid Conservatory under the guidance of Manuel de Falla, developed an outstanding musical activity in Cuba. Together with her husband Antonio Quevedo, she co-founded the Society of Contemporary Music in 1929, promoted the cultural journal “Musicalia” and founded the Havana Choral Society. Together with Fernando Ortiz, she gave summer courses on musicology at the Havana University from the 1930s. Those courses nurtured and stimulated the careers of some future outstanding musicologists such as María Teresa Linares Savio (b. 1920).

One of the earliest contribution to musicological studies in Cuba was provided by Emilio Grenet, brother of the famous Cuban composer Eliseo Grenet.

Emilio Grenet was born in Havana in 1901 and passed away in the same city, in 1941. He studied Sight-reading and Music theory with professor Armando Laguardia and worked as a pianist in New York City in 1923. After returning to Cuba he traveled to Spain where he met composer Joaquín Turina who introduced him to his professor of Harmony, Conrado del Campo.

Grenet returned again to Cuba where he worked in the Education Ministry Radio Station, started his investigations about the genres of Cuban popular music and travelled to New York City to record with the orchestra of his brother Eliseo Grenet. He taught Musical composition to the renowned Cuban conductor Enrique González Mántici and Harmony to the composer and guitarist Vicente González Rubiera (Guyún).

In 1939, Grenet published his important work "Cuban popular music", which represented a serious study of the Cuban popular music genres, and a thorough insight into the most important aspects of the musical creation in Cuba, from the 19th Century until that time. The book also included 80 scores of representative compositions.

== 1940s and 1950s ==
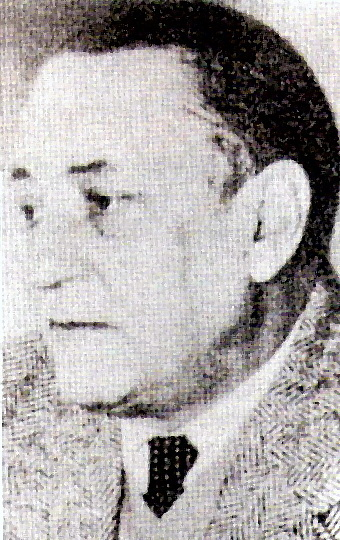
Alejo Carpentier.

In 1946, the famous Cuban writer, art critic and musicologist Alejo Carpentier (b. 104) established a benchmark with his work “La música en Cuba” (1946), an attempt to put together a comprehensive history of Cuban music from the 16th century until his time. Although the work presented as facts some controversial historical issues, such as the origins of the well known “Son de la Mateodora” and the “Cuban Contradanza”, this important study (based on extensive investigations conducted by Carpentier) offered a deep insight into Cuban music history never witnessed before.

Coincidentally, young composers and musicologists such as Argeliers León (b. 1918) and Hilario González (b. 1920) were diligently working along with José Ardévol at “Grupo de Renovación Musical” to improve and renovate the Cuban musical panorama. In 1947, Argeliers León continued offering the musicology summer courses started by María Muñoz and Fernando Ortiz at the Havana University and served as a professor of such prominent students as pianist and professor Ana Margarita Aguilera Ripoll (b. 1903), author of the important compilation of children songs “Cancionero Infantil de Hispanoamérica.” Other contemporary Cuban musicologists were María Antonieta Henriquez, founder of the National Museum of Music, and Lydia Cabrera, an anthropologist renowned for her studies of Afro-Cuban music.

== Post revolutionary period (1959) ==
After the Cuban Revolution in 1959, Pablo Hernández Balaguer (b. 1928) was teaching musicology at the Oriente University, an educational institution that offered the first Music Degree in the history of Cuba. Balaguer conducted an important study about the work of composer Esteban Salas and published the Music Catalog from the archives of the Santiago de Cuba Cathedral. He was a professor of several distinguished musicologists such as Virtudes Feliú Herrera (b. 1941), who conducted a thorough research into Cuban historical ritual and festive traditions. Her work has been compiled in the “Ethnographic Atlas of Cuba,” which received an award from the Cuban Academy of Science.

Argeliers León and his wife María Teresa Linares Savio were the leading figures of Cuban musicology during the early decades after the Cuban Revolution (1959). Between 1961 and 1970, León was de director of the Institute of Ethnology and Folklore at the Academy of Sciences of Cuba and he also headed the Folklore Department at the National Theater of Cuba, the Music Department of the José Martí National Library and the Music Department at Casa de Las Américas. He served as professor at the Havana Municipal Conservatory, taught African cultures in Cuba at the Havana University and musicology at the Instituto Superior de Arte (ISA). As a musicologist he published several books which included Del Canto y el Tiempo (1974), where he proposed a subdivision in “generic complexes” to study the musical styles in Cuba.

María Teresa Linares conducted extensive investigation on several areas of Cuban music history and published numerous books and articles. She worked as a professor at the Alejandro García Caturla Conservatory, the Havana University and the Institute of Ethnology and Folklore at the Academy of Sciences. Until year 2000 she was the director of the Museum of Music, and at a later time she was affiliated to the Fernando Ortiz Foundation.

During the first decade of the Cuban Revolution (1960 to 1970) an emerging generation of musicologists started to acquire recognition within the Cuban musical scene. We should mention, in first place, two humble and dedicated investigators that had certain common characteristics. They both had university backgrounds and worked for many years at the José Martí National Library as researchers; also their main subjects of investigation were somewhat related to the musicological work of Alejo Carpentier. Alberto Muguercia (b. 19280), a lawyer from Santiago de Cuba holds the honor of having refuted one of the greatest myths in the history of Cuban music: The “Son de la Ma Teodora” origins. In his famous book “La música en Cuba”, Alejo Carpentier categorically attributed a 16th-century origin to a popular melody called Son de la Ma Teodora without conducting a thorough investigation about the subject, thus establishing an erroneous fact as a popular tradition. In a brilliant article about this subject: “Teodora Ginés: ¿Mito o realidad histórica? Muguercia demonstrated the inaccuracy of this theory.

In turn, Zolia Lapique (b. 1930), a librarian and historian, refuted a theory formulated by Carpentier in reference to the French-Haitian origin of the “Contradanza Cubana”. She attributed an earlier development and other possible origins (Spanish and English) to this musical style in her outstanding article: “Aportes Franco-Haitianos a la contradanza cubana: mitos y realidades.” Other prominent members of this generation are: Cristóbal Díaz Ayala (b. 1930), author of a complete Cuban music discography, Jorge Ibarra (b. 1931), Leonardo Acosta (b. 1933), Dulcila Cañizares (b. 1936), Raul Martínez Rodríguez (b. 1937), Helio Orovio (b. 1938), Radamés Giro (b. 1940), Danilo Orozco (b. 1944) and Alberto Faya (1944).

== The second generation (1970s) and beyond ==
The members of the second generation of Cuban musicologists that appeared during the Cuban Revolution period, graduated in their great majority either from the Havana Municipal Conservatory or the Instituto Superior de Arte (ISA), which from 1976 offered the first Musicology Degree in the history of Cuba. Many of them worked at a later time at the newly created Centro para la investigación y desarrollo de la música cubana (CIDMUC), founded in 1978. From this group we should mention two renowned musicologists that frequently worked in collaboration with each other: Victoria Elí (b. 1945) and Zoila Gómez (b. 1948). We should also mention Tamahra Martín (b. 1945), who dedicated two books to the Cuban choral music: “La música coral en Cuba” (1987) and “Música Coral” (1990).

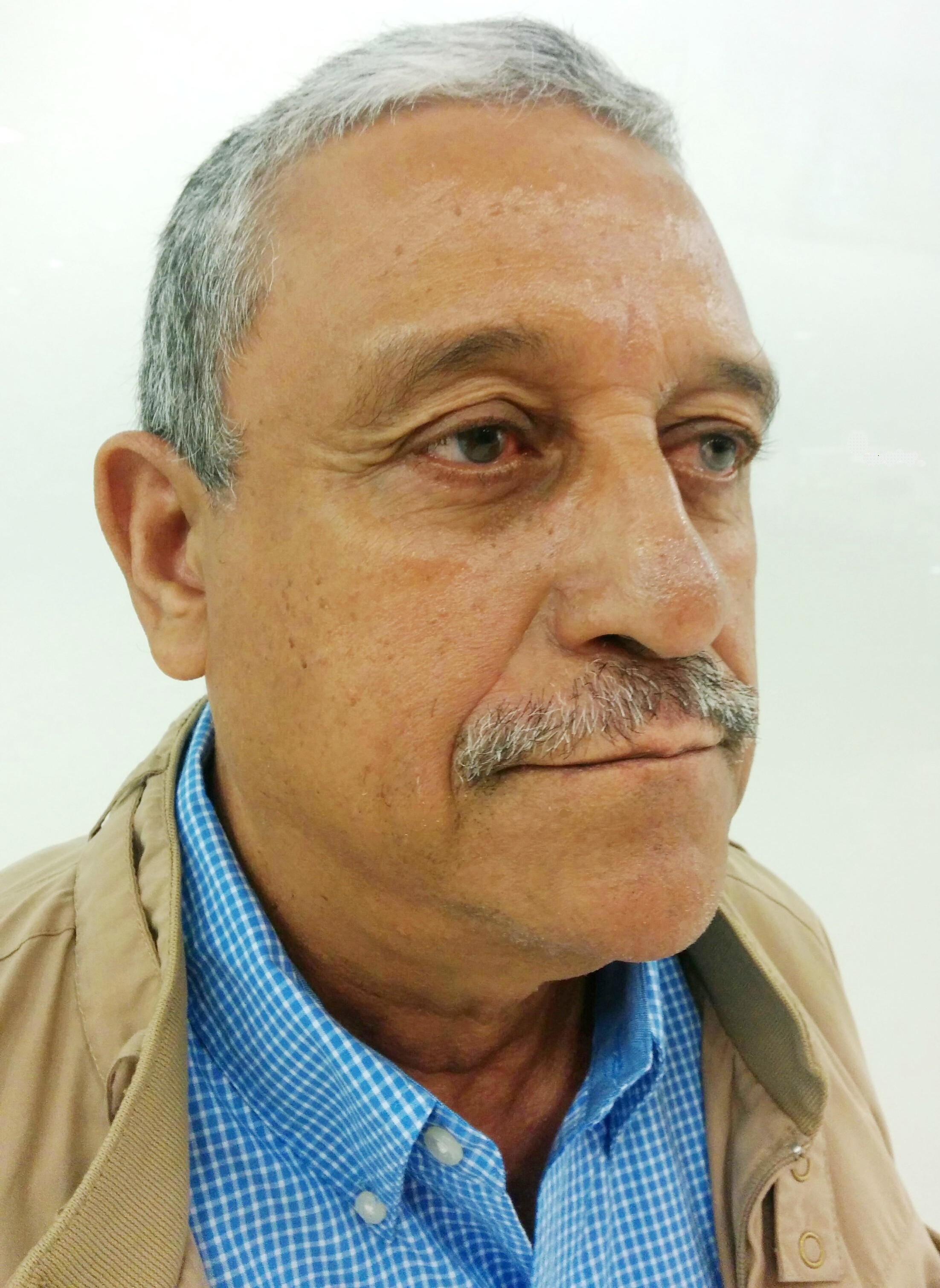
Rolando Antonio Pérez Fernández, musicólogo, violonchelista y profesor cubano.

Two other important musicologists from this generation are: Alberto Alén Pérez (b. 1948) and Rolando Antonio Pérez Fernández (b. 1947). Alberto Alén applied his extensive knowledge of psychology and statistics to musical form analysis as well as music pedagogy, in publications such as: “La forma de las formas musicales” and “Diagnosticar la musicalidad”. Rolando Pérez developed extensive investigations about Afro-Cuban music and is well known for having documented and analyzed the process of transition from ternary rhythms to binary rhythms of the Cuban and Latin American popular music, during the 18th and 19th centuries, in his book: “Proceso de binarización de los ritmos ternarios africanos en América Latina (1987).”

Olavo Alén (b. 1947) has closely followed the steps of Argeliers León in his studies of Afro-Cuban music and, most importantly, has elaborated and expanded León's theory of “generic complexes”, in works such as: “Géneros de la música cubana” from 1976.

Those theories have been strongly refuted by other musicologists such as Leonardo Acosta, who explains in his article “De los complejos genéricos y otras cuestiones”:

“Fortunately, the theology [sic] of generic complexes has been viewed with skepticism in musicological circles of several countries, including Cuba, where quite a few musicologists have oscillated [in his opinion] between rejection, disbelief and disdain …”

Other members of this Group are renowned musicologists Martha Ezquenazi (1949), Jesús Gómez Cairo (1949) and Dora Ileana Torres (1956).

Most recently, a group of young Cuban musicologists have earned a well deserved reputation within the international academic field, due to their solid investigative work. Some of the most prominent members of this group are: Miriam Escudero Suástegui, Liliana González Moreno, Iván César Morales Flores and Pablo Alejandro Suárez Marrero.

== See also ==
- Music of Cuba
