= Mike Porcel =

Cuban-born American musician

Mike Porcel is an exiled Cuban born-American musician, guitarist, composer, orchestrator and songwriter better associated with the Cuban musical movement of the 60s & 70s Nueva trova. He has been called one of the most influential and creative contemporary Cuban musician of his generation. His compositions carry a heavy dose of poetry mixed with complex guitar melodies influenced by a tremendous array of musical styles, from classical music to rock, jazz, ethnic rhythms and new age. He was also the co-founder and musical director of the Cuban progressive-rock band "Síntesis".

== Biography ==
Mike Porcel was born under the name Michael Charles Porcel Henriques in Havana, Cuba on April 13, 1950. He began his musical education at the Fernandez Vila Conservatory under some of the most recognized Cuban figures of those days such as Alberto Bernal, Leopoldina Nuñez, Harold Gramatges, Alfredo Diez Nieto, Vicente Gonzalez Rubiera "Guyun" and Angel Vasquez Millares to mention a few. From them he learned classical guitar and harmony applied to the instrument, traditional harmony, counterpoint, composition, orchestration and music appreciation.

Mike as he would later be known in the music scene began his professional career in 1968 at the age of 18 when he joins the rock group "Los Dada", one of the most controversial and avant-garde Cuban bands of the sixties. There along with Pedro Luis Ferrer he shared singing duties as well as playing the guitar. Some of his compositions from those days are. "No quiero ser distinto", "Recuerdo de dos vivos" and "No me importa". Two years later he would leave the band to start his solo career.

The early 70s found Mike performing as a singer-songwriter in some of the best and well known theaters of Havana such as "Teatro Bellas Artes", "Sala Teatro Hubert de Blanck", "Teatro Amadeo Roldán", "Teatro Mella" and "Teatro Karl Marx". He also composed music for several theater plays for the group "Teatro Estudio" such as "La hija de las flores" and "Se hace camino al andar". At the same time he worked with Vicente Revuelta as a musical director for the Bertolt Brecht plays "Madre coraje y sus hijos" and "Galileo".

In 1974 he created along with actor Carlos Ruiz de la Tejera the show "Que hablen los poetas" (a combination of music, acting and poetry). The simplicity of the concept allowed them to reach many different types of audiences and tour within Cuba. At this time Mike also started taking his first steps in orchestration and arrangement so his first orchestration job could be found in Amaury Perez's first LP "Acuardate de Abril" (1976). "Versos de José Martí" (1978) another of Amaury's LP was orchestrated by Porcel, also composing the music for two of the tracks in this album. Mike, an admirer of Jose Marti's poetry, will also set music to some of his poems such as "Mi caballero", "Mucho señora daría", "Ismaelillo", "A bordo" and "Abril". He has also set to music poems of other international poets such as Rabindranath Tagore, Walt Whitman, Joseph Brodsky and Alberto Baeza Flores among others.

Other singers began to include in their repertoire some of Mike Porcel's songs, like the famous Argentinian singer and actress Nacha Guevara that recorded "Ay del amor", "Diario", "Don Carlos" and "En busca de una nueva flor" in her LP title "Para cuando me vaya" (1978). That same year Argelia Fragoso recorded "En busca de una nueva flor" and this song would win that year's first prize amongst other 262 presented in the World Festival of Youth and Students that took place in Havana, Cuba. In 1976 Mike co-founded the progressive rock band "Síntesis" until this day something never done before in Cuba and as the musical director of the group it is very evident Porcel's influence in the first LP of the band titled "En busca de una nueva flor" where Mike collaborates with three of his songs, the self-titled "En busca de una nueva flor", "Nueve ejemplares no tan raros" and "Variaciones sobre el zapateo". Porcel wanted to incorporate elements of theater to the band's shows and this created conflicts with other members so in 1979 he left the group saying "Some of the members of the band felt as if we were giving the music a secondary role, but I thought of it as adding another element to it".

In 1980 due to political discrepancies with the totalitarian communist government of Cuba Mike was banned and erased from the music scene. He was denied the right to work on any cultural activities as well as banned from the radio and TV shows, and at the same time denied the permit to leave Cuba. The Nueva Trova movement then sent him a written letter of repudiation followed by violent acts against him and his family. He was also persecuted, humiliated and harassed by the government officials for about nine years. Ironically though year's later Nueva Trova artists such as Pablo Milanés and Santiago Feliu would perform and or record Mike's songs. He was separated from his family, wife and son whom he would not see again for many years until 1994.

It wasn't until 1989 thanks to the "Committee of Human Rights" of the United Nations that he was able to leave Cuba and immigrate to Spain.

In Spain he embarks himself in different projects such as: "Mis momentos felices" (a CD by Cuban/Spanish singer Elsa Baeza) as a composer, arranger and musical director. He also created "Que hablen los poetas" (Version II) and starts performing with Miss Baeza and The Spaniard actor Francisco Rojas throughout different cities of Spain and Belgium and composing music for TV shows.

In 1994 he finally reunites with his family in the United States of America where he lives today. He has participated as a composer, performer or musical director in many shows and theatre plays such as: "Homenaje a Alberto Baeza Flores" (play), "Despues de tanta vida" (concert), "Un ramo de flores y una bandera" (recital), "Recordando a Martí" (recital), "Seis mujeres recuerdan a Lecuona" (composer) to mention a few. He has also created music for TV shows "Buenos días" and "Más allá" for TVE (Spanish Public TV) and cartoon animated series such as "Little Carlota" and "Mimi and Mr. Bobo"; documentaries "Make a little difference", "A global view" and "Mind awareness campaign" for UNCHR, "Un siglo en Madrid" & "Corpus Christi" for Telson Video.

In 2008 he released "Intactvs", a CD with songs that he was never able to record before in Cuba as well as newer songs never before heard by the public until then.

== Discography ==
=== As a performer ===
- En Busca de Una Nueva Flor, Síntesis (1978)
- Echoes, Mike Porcel (2004)
- Intactvs, Mike Porcel (2008)

=== Orchestrations ===
- Acuérdate de Abril, Amaury Perez (1976) Orchestration, Mike Porcel
- Poemas de Jose Martí, Amaury Perez (1978) Orchestration, Mike Porcel
- La Hora de la Ronda (1980) Musical direction & arrangement, Mike Porcel
- Mis Momentos Felices, Elsa Baeza (1990) Production, orchestration & music, Mike Porcel

== List of artists that have recorded Mike Porcel's songs ==
Amaury Perez

- Abril (Poemas de Jose Marti LP, 1978)
- Diario (Acuérdate de Abril LP, 1976)

Argelia Fragoso

- En busca de una nueva flor (En busca de una nueva flor Single, 1978)

Bobby Jimenez

- Ay del amor (Alma Cubana CD, 2000)

Elsa Baeza

- No sé qué voy a hacer con tu recuerdo (Mis Momentos Felices CD, 1990)
- Diario (Mis Momentos Felices CD, 1990)
- Ay del amor (Mis Momentos Felices CD, 1990)
- Qué hubiera sido de mi (Mis Momentos Felices CD, 1990)
- Amigos (Mis Momentos Felices CD, 1990)
- Mis momentos felices (Mis Momentos Felices CD, 1990)
- Vivir (Mis Momentos Felices CD, 1990)
- Te amo (Mis Momentos Felices CD, 1990)
- A un reloj de pared (Mis Momentos Felices CD, 1990)

Ivette Cepeda

- Ay del amor (Estaciones CD/DVD, 2010)

Nacha Guevara

- Don Carlos (Para Cuando Me Vaya LP, 1978)
- Ay del amor (Para Cuando Me Vaya LP, 1978)
- Diario (Para Cuando Me Vaya LP, 1978)
- En busca de una nueva flor (Para Cuando Me Vaya LP, 1978)

Pablo Milanes

- Abril (Colección para Vivir Vol 2 CD, 1996)
- Abril (Aniversario CD, 1997)
- Abril (Serie Millennium CD, 1999)
