= Alberto Alén Pérez =

Cuban musicologist and cellist

Alberto Alén Pérez (1948 in Havana – 14 October 2004) was a Cuban musicologist and cellist.

== Early life and education ==
Alén studied violoncello with Professor Fabio Landa at Alejandro García Caturla Conservatory in Marianao, Havana, and at the Amadeo Roldán Conservatory in the same city. He also studied psychology at the Havana University and musicology in the Instituto Superior de Arte (ISA) where he graduated in 1982.

== Biography ==
As a cellist, Alén worked in several orchestras such as the Orquesta Popular de Conciertos founded by Alfredo Diez Nieto and the Orchestra of the Grand Theater of Havana. He also performed in other orchestras affiliated to the Cuban Radio and Television Network. Alén taught at the Higher Institute of Art (ISA) and worked as researcher at the Center for Research and Development of Cuban Music. He worked also as an adviser for musical programs in Cuban Television. Alberto Alén gave classes and lectures in Cuba, Mexico and Algeria. His works on musicology include: Perspectivas de la investigación musical actual (1976), La forma de las formas musicales (1978) and La génesis del espacio musical (1986). Also in 1986, Alén received the prestigious Casa de Las Américas Prize on the musicology category for his book: Diagnosticar la musicalidad.

== Work ==
Although Alén's work remains relatively unknown to the general public, it actually represents a relevant contribution to musicology. According to Eugene Chadbourne, “Musicology students might consider making Spanish their Language Major simply to study the works of Alberto Alén... by any standards Alen's most challenging work has been a series of five books written and published between 1976 and 1986”.

His early work: La forma de las formas musicales (The form of musical forms), is for the musicological science what the Bauhaus investigations and experimentations represented for the modern development of visual arts and design. In this article, Alberto Alén applied his extensive knowledge of psychology and statistics to the traditional musical forms analysis. In it he explains, referring to the perception of musical structures: “The visual forms (as well as the audition and tactile forms) are something different from a succession or sum of particular sensations. They are something else. The complex of stimulations that arrive to the retina (or to the Organ of Corti in the case of audition) generate, at a cortical level, – so affirms Pavlov- “functional systems that act integrally as in the case of an elemental conditioned reflex’, where all particular contents of different stimulations is transcended when reflecting their multiple reciprocal relationships, that are continuously exerting influence between each other (González, 1960: 72; Rubinstein, 1967:274).

“Diagnosticar la Musicalidad, the latest of Alen's tomes, continues an in-depth study of practical musical phenomena that rivals the writings of the German composer and musicologist Paul Hindemith”... states Eugene Chadbuorne in reference to this particular work from Alberto Alén. In Diagnosticar la Musicalidad, the author presents to the general public the results of an extensive investigation, conducted between 1976 and 1983 with the purpose to improve the musical tests performed in Cuban schools to select new music students.

== See also ==
Music of Cuba
