= Porcelli =

Porcelli or Porcelly is an Italian surname that may refer to

- Antonio Porcelli (1800–1870), Italian painter
- Daniela Porcelli (born 1961), Italian Olympic runner
- Giovanni Tacci Porcelli (1863–1928), Italian Cardinal of the Roman Catholic Church
- John Porcelly (born 1967), American guitarist
- Pietro Porcelli (1872–1943), Italian-Australian sculptor

== See also ==
- Porcellis
- Porcel
