= Alfredo Diez Nieto =

Cuban composer, conductor and professor (1918–2021)

- Born: 25 October 1918; Havana, Cuba
- Died: 23 October 2021 (aged 102); Havana, Cuba
- Education: Conservatorio Iranzo; Juilliard School of Music
- Occupations: Composer; Conductor; Academic teacher
- Organizations: Instituto Musical Kohly; Amadeo Roldán Conservatory; National Art School; Instituto Superior de Arte; Musical Institute of Folkloric Research; Orquesta Popular de Conciertos

Alfredo Diez Nieto (25 October 1918 – 23 October 2021) was a Cuban composer, conductor, and professor. He taught composition at Instituto Musical Kohly, the Amadeo Roldán Conservatory, the National Art School, and the Instituto Superior de Arte in Havana. He founded and conducted the Orquesta Popular de Conciertos. Diez Nieto composed orchestral works including three symphonies and chamber music for various instruments, using and transforming elements from Cuban folk music.

== Life and career ==
Alfredo Diez Nieto was born in Havana (La Habana), Cuba, on 25 October 1918. He enrolled at the Conservatorio Iranzo in Havana and studied composition, counterpoint, fugue, music history, music theory, orchestration, piano, and pedagogy with professors Rosario Iranzo, Jaime Prats, Juana Prendes, Amadeo Roldán, and Pedro Sanjuán. He completed his education at the Juilliard School of Music in New York, where he studied composition with Bernard Wagenaar, orchestral conducting with Fritz Mahler and piano with Eduard Steuermann.

Diez Nieto began teaching in 1934; he taught composition, counterpoint and fugue, harmony, music history, orchestration, and piano at the Instituto Musical Kohly, the Amadeo Roldán Conservatory, the National Art School, and the Instituto Superior de Arte in Havana. In 1949 Diez Nieto, along with musicologist Odilio Urfé, founded the Musical Institute of Folkloric Research, an organization dedicated to preserving and disseminating information about the ethnomusicological history of Cuba. Through this organization, the duo formed the Orquesta Popular de Conciertos (Popular Concert Orchestra), which was formed by freelance musicians and other members of several popular music orchestras. Diez Nieto served as the orchestra's conductor. Urfé described Diez Nieto's work at the Institute as significant to the development of Cuban music. The Musical Institute was later renamed in 1963 as the Seminario de Música Popular (Seminary of Popular Music). In 1959, Diez Nieto established the Alejandro García Caturla Conservatory in Marianao, Havana. During the years 1965 and 1966, he led the band of the general staff of the Cuban Revolutionary Army.

The concerts offered in Havana by the Orquesta Popular de Conciertos at the Church of San Francisco de Paula during 1967, as well as in the Amadeo Roldán Theatre in 1972, were well regarded. In 1971, the Orquesta Popular was renamed the Orquesta Popular de Conciertos Gonzalo Roig. Diez Nieto performed as a pianist and also conducted the Orquesta Sinfónica de la Escuela Nacional de Música and the Orquesta Sinfónica de Camagüey. He conducted works by Johann Sebastian Bach, Ludwig van Beethoven, Ignacio Cervantes, Alejandro García Caturla, George Frederick Handel, Joseph Haydn, Felix Mendelssohn, Wolfgang Amadeus Mozart, Eduardo Sánchez de Fuentes and Antonio Vivaldi; and premiered his Organ Concerto, with Manuel Suárez as a soloist. He also accompanied soloists such as sopranos Emelina López, Yolanda Hernández, Susy Oliva and Lucy Provedo; pianists Frank Emilio Flynn, Julio Hamel, Alberto Joya and Roberto Urbay; violinists Rafael Lay, Armando Ortega, and Celso Valdés Santandreu; flutists Richard Egües and Alfredo Portela; oboist María de los Ángeles Castellanos; guitarist Flores Chaviano; and clarinetist Rubén Noriega.

Diez Nieto died in Havana of a heart attack on 23 October 2021, shortly before his 103rd birthday. At the time of his death, he was the oldest active composer in Cuba.

== Work ==
Diez Nieto's compositions employ elements typical of Cuban folk music. He never directly quotes from folk music, but creates original music which recalls it; such as in his pieces Los Diablitos (The Little Devils, 1969) based on an Afro-Cuban Abakuá dance, and Yo te pedí un aguinaldo ("I asked you for a Christmas bonus"; "aguinaldo" also refers to a flowering plant common in Cuba) for voice and orchestra. His compositions have been performed in Spain, Russia, Bulgaria, Czechoslovakia, Hungary and Poland. Among his best-known works are the series of Estampas (Prints) for piano, Symphony No. 1 (1943), Violin Sonata, Guitar Sonata, and En memoria de mi esposa Lillian (In memory of my wife Lillian, 2010). Other important works include his Piano Sonata, Sudor y látigo (Sweat and Whip), and the Quintet for String Orchestra.

== Awards ==
Nieto received numerous awards and honors for his contributions to teaching and developing the music of Cuba, such as an honorary doctorate from the Universidad de las Artes of the Instituto Superior de Arte, the Premio Nacional de Música (National Music Award) (2004), Premio Nacional de Enseñanza Artística (National Award of Artistic Teaching) (2005), the Order of Félix Varela, first degree (2020) and the Distinción Abelardo Estorino en Teatro (Abelardo Estorino Distinction in Theater, 2020) from the Ministry of Culture.
