= Porcel =

Porcel is a Spanish surname. Notable people with the surname include:

- Antoine Porcel (1937–2014), French Olympic boxer
- Baltasar Porcel (1937–2009), Spanish writer, journalist and literary critic
- Bartomeu Rosselló-Pòrcel (1913–1938), Spanish poet
- Elvio Porcel de Peralta (1938–2000), Argentine professional footballer
- Jorge Porcel (1936–2006), Argentine comedy actor and television host
- José Antonio Porcel (1715–1794), Spanish poet and writer
- Marisa Porcel (1943–2018), Spanish stage, film and television actress
- Mike Porcel, Cuban-American musician, guitarist, composer, orchestrator and songwriter
- Raúl Angelo Porcel Gonzáles (born 1954), Bolivian politician and journalist

== See also ==
- Porcelli
- Porcellis
