= María Teresa Linares Savio =

Cuban musicologist, ethnographer, and music researcher (1920–2021)

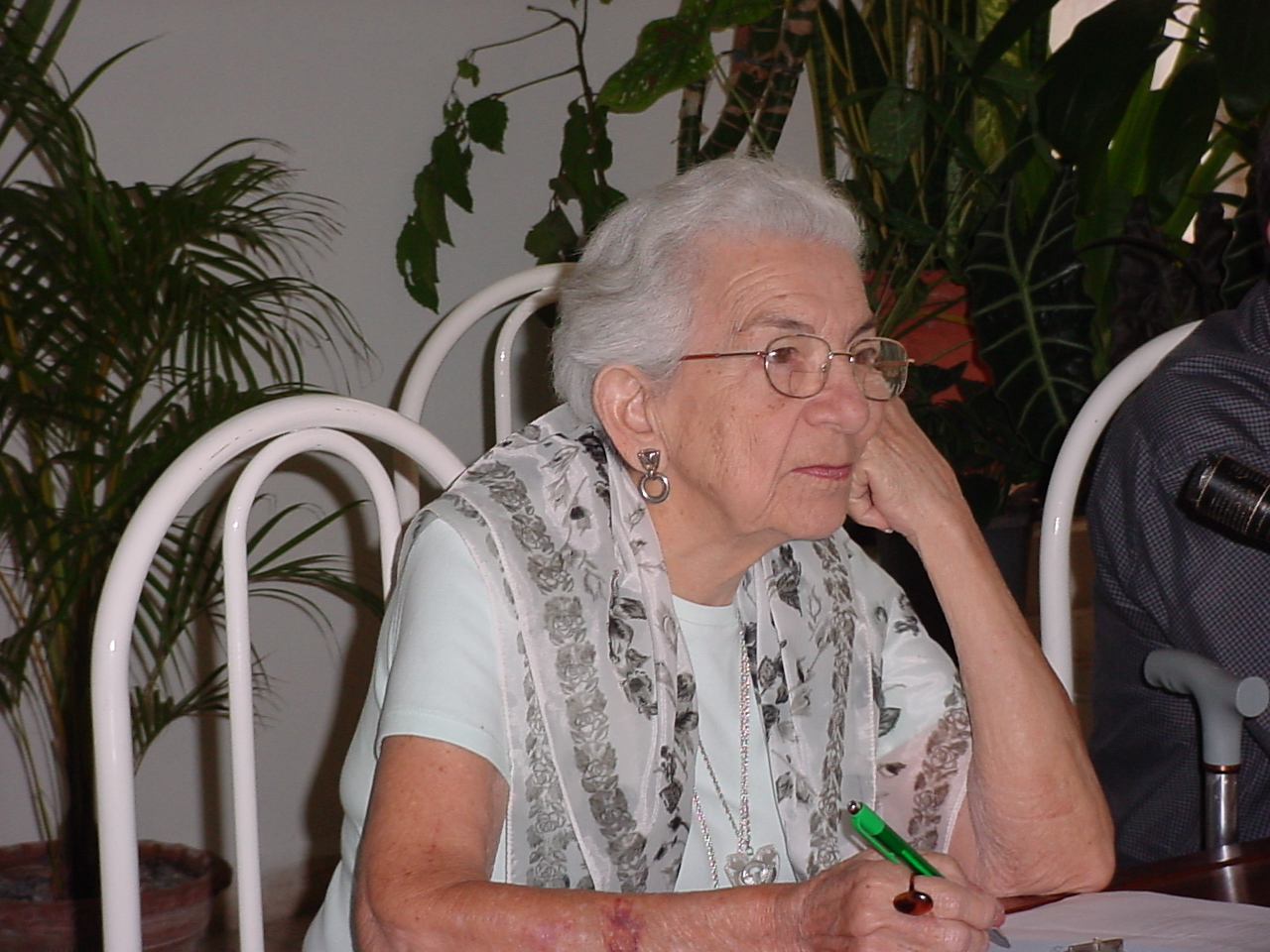
María Teresa Linares Savio, musicologist, and ethnographer, has dedicated her life as a professor and Cuban Music researcher.

María Teresa Linares Savio (14 August 1920 – 26 January 2021) was a Cuban musicologist, ethnographer, and researcher of Cuban music. She had a degree from the University of Havana in Literature and Hispanic Language Majoring Cuban Studies, a PhD in Art Sciences, and a Doctor Honoris Causa of the Superior Arts Institute of Cuba (1996). Linares taught in Havana's prestigious music conservatories Amadeo Roldán and Alejandro García Caturla, as well as lecturing at the University of Havana. Since a young age she was involved in music interpretation and investigation.

== Biography ==
Linares was born in Havana, Cuba in August 1920.

She was, along with her husband, ethno-musicologist Argeliers León, a founder of the Institute of Ethnology and Folklore of the Academy of Sciences of Cuba, where she carried out field researches and gave courses to students. She then worked as a producer of music in EGREM, before later being appointed Director of the Museum of Music. She also became vice-president of the Fernando Ortiz Foundation. Her professional activities also included production of ethnographic records based on personal research and investigations, as well as Cuban country music, and promotion of both aspiring musicians and traditional artists. She traveled extensively at home and abroad, visiting more than 20 countries in Europe, Africa, North, Central and South America.

Linares was President of the Musicology Section of the Association of Musicians of the Union of Writers and Artists of Cuba (UNEAC, Spanish acronym) and was member of its Presidency Council, later becoming a Merit Member.

She had an extensive bio-bibliography with emphasis on Cuban and Latin American cultural roots. Altogether she wrote 10 books, over 30 articles and more than 100 music records about Cuban and Caribbean music and ethnology. Her most distinguished books include “Introducción a Cuba”, “La Música y el Pueblo”, “La Música Entre Cuba y España”, “El Punto Cubano” musicological analysis of Cuban Country Music and "La Habanera” an in-depth analysis of a 19-Century genre still popular in Spain and Mexico, among other publications.

Linares was awarded the “Frank País” Order, “Juan Marinello” Order, “Romárico Cordero” Order, Distinction for the National Culture, “Antero Regalado” Distinction, “Alejo Carpentier” Medal, National Award for Research in Culture, “Fernando Ortíz International Research Prize”(2000) and the National Cultural Research Prize (1999).

She died in January 2021 at the age of 100.

== See also ==
- Argeliers León
- Music of Cuba
- Musicology in Cuba
