= Rosita De Hornedo =

Rosita De Hornedo Building
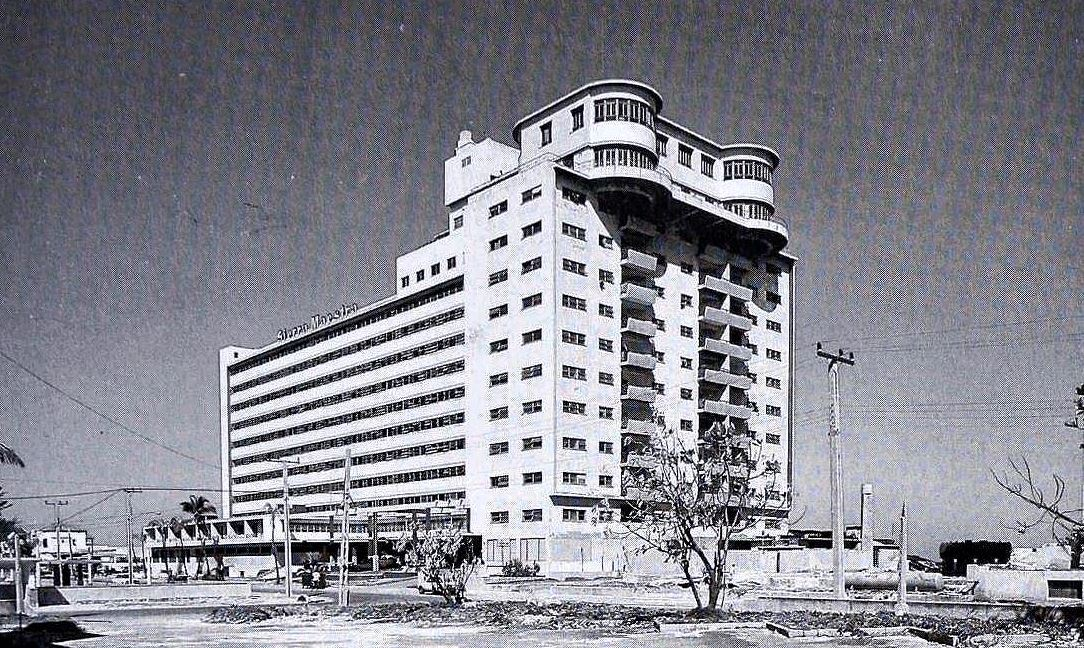
- Street side elevation (view from south-east)
- Interactive map of the Rosita De Hornedo Building area
- Alternative names: Hotel Sierra Maestra

General information
- Type: Residential
- Architectural style: Modern
- Location: Miramar, 1st street. between 0 and 2; Corner of O, Playa, Ciudad de La Habana, Cuba
- Coordinates: 23.1319°N 82.4158°W
- Elevation: Sea level
- Named for: Wife of Alfredo Hornedo
- Opened: 1955
- Owner: Revolutionary government (contested) (Note: This theft of private property led the U.S. into severing diplomatic relations in 1961 and installing the trade embargo and various sanctions against Cuba. "Thousands of Americans and Cuban citizens suffered humiliation and financial distresses of having their private property stolen from them, some of them at gunpoint. Today there has been no justice for that their claims.")

Technical details
- Floor count: 11

Design and construction
- Architect: Cristóbal Martínez Márquez

Other information
- Number of rooms: 172 apts.

The Hotel Rosita De Hornedo (renamed Hotel Sierra Maestra), located in the Puntilla area of Miramar, was one of the first major buildings to be built by a private developer in the 1950s in Havana, Cuba. (Note: The Hornedo family were the owners of the Rosita de Hornedo and the larger (201 apts.), poured concrete Riomar Building also by the architect Cristóbal Martínez Márquez, located in the adjoining lot to the east.)

== Alfredo Hornedo ==
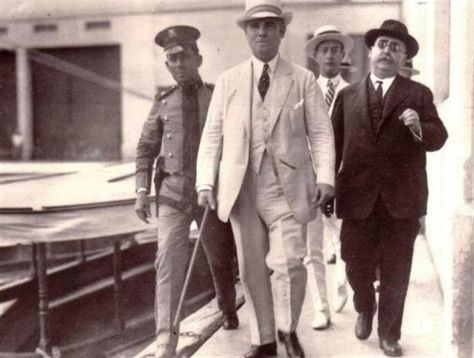
Senator Alfredo Hornedo Suárez, of the Patido Liberal. Owner of the Mercado Unico, the Mercado de Carlos III, the Casino Deportivo, and the newspapers El Pais, Excelsior, el Sol, El Crisol. He also built the Blanquita Theater, the Hotel Rosita Hornedo, and the Riomar Building, and was the owner of several radio stations.

Alfredo Hornedo y Suárez entered politics and was elected by the Liberal Party, first in 1914, as Councilman of the City of Havana, until he became a Senator; elected 1938 and reelected in 1944 and 1948. He was also delegated to the Constitutional Assembly of 1940 and presided over the Liberal Party between 1939 and 1947. In 1957, the Rosita De Hornedo, named after his second wife, Rosita Almanza, was built by the senator, who also owned the newspaper El País on Calle Reina, the Excélsior newspaper, and the Mercado Único of La Habana. Hornedo built other properties in the area, including the larger (201 apartments) Riomar Building, also by the architect Cristóbal Martínez Márquez and located in the adjoining lot. Alfredo Hornedo y Suárez was the owner of the Blanquita theater which opened in 1950, now the Karl Marx Theatre, and the Sports Casino, which is today the social circle Cristino Naranjo.

== Architecture ==
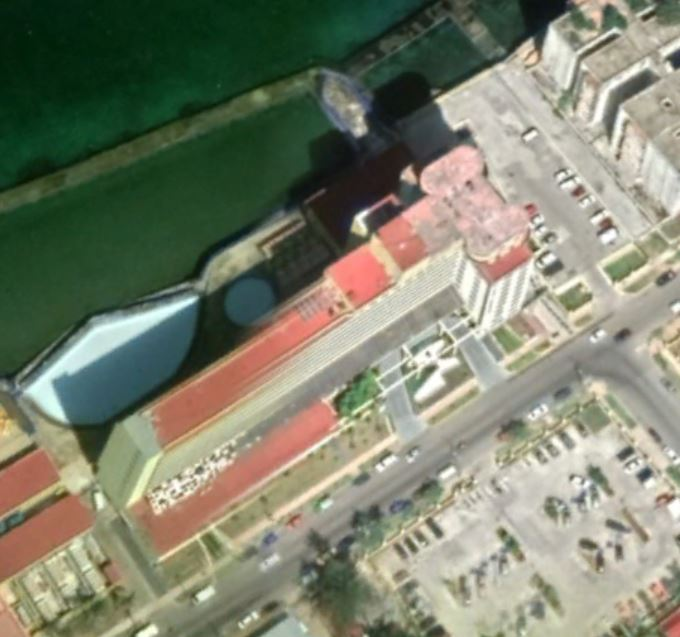
Aerial view of the Rosita De Hornedo building. 1st street between 0 and 2; Corner of O, Playa. The larger (201 apts.), poured concrete the Riomar Building, also by the same owner and architect Cristóbal Martínez Márquez, Can be seen at the top of the image.

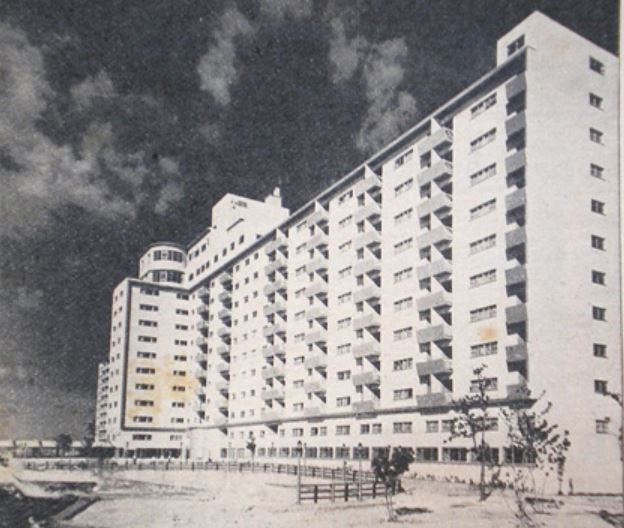
Rosita De Hornedo building. North elevation, oceanside view.

The trapezoidal site accommodates the building on its south side, and parallel to 1st street; there are several outdoor swimming pools on the north side of the site.

The Rosita De Hornedo has a semi-covered Porte-cochère with a lightly sloping ramp that brings automobiles to the front entrance of the building. There are a total 13 floors above the ground floor level. The ground floor is composed of the primary building entrance which is close to the elevator core, and commercial services and attendant functions; above the ground floor, there are 12 floors of residential units containing 172 apartments including the top two floors which have two circular pent-house apartments that overhang the east side of the building giving it a distinctive European, modernist and expressionist character. (Note: Expressionist architecture was individualistic and in many ways eschewed aesthetic dogma,[7] but it is still useful to develop some criteria which defines it. Though containing a great variety and differentiation, many points can be found as recurring in works of Expressionist architecture, and are evident to some degree in each of its works.: Distortion of form for an emotional effect.; Subordination of realism to a symbolic or stylistic expression of inner experience.; An underlying effort at achieving the new, original, and visionary.; Profusion of works on paper, and models, with discovery and representations of concepts more important than pragmatic finished products.; Often hybrid solutions, irreducible to a single concept.; Themes of natural romantic phenomena, such as caves, mountains, lightning, crystal and rock formations. As such it is more mineral and elemental than florid and organic which characterized its close contemporary Art Nouveau.; Uses creative potential of artisan craftsmanship.; Tendency more towards the Gothic than the Classical architecture. Expressionist architecture also tends more towards the Romanesque and the Rococo than the classical.; Though a movement in Europe, expressionism is as eastern as western. It draws as much from Moorish, Islamic, Egyptian, and Indian art and architecture as from Roman or Greek.; Most important, the conception of architecture as a work of art.) The Senador Alfredo Hornedo y Sánchez, owner of the Hornedo, lived in the estate Blanca de Ceiba and in the mansion of Carlos III No. 120, the current House of Culture of Centro Habana, then moved to the penthouse of his Hotel Rosita de Hornedo, he lived in one of the penthouses.

The apartments on the lower 10 floors have a living room, kitchenette, and a balcony on the north side units, and strip windows overlooking Miramar's First Avenue. The elevations are composed of a modernist curtain wall, its north side facing the sea contains a balcony between apartments that are shared by the units; there are six lines of balconies, the two lines furthest to the east serve single apartments. As opposed to the south elevation which contains strip windows spanning the entire length of the facade, the north elevation, as does the east elevation, has rectangular windows.

== Residential building block ==
In general, high rise apartment buildings have technical and economic advantages and especially in areas of high population density such as Havana. In contrast with low-rise and single-family houses, apartment blocks can accommodate more inhabitants per unit of area of land and decrease the cost of municipal infrastructure. The typical residential tower block with its concrete construction is a familiar feature of Modernist architecture. Influential examples include Le Corbusier's "housing unit" his Unité d'Habitation, repeated in various European cities starting with his Cité radieuse in Marseille (1947–52), constructed of béton brut, rough-cast concrete, as steel for framework was unavailable in post-war France. Residential tower blocks became standard in housing urban populations displaced by slum clearances and "urban renewal".

High-rise projects after World War II typically rejected the classical designs of the early skyscrapers, instead embracing the uniform international style; many older skyscrapers were redesigned to suit contemporary tastes or even got demolished - such as New York's Singer Building, once the world's tallest skyscraper. However, with the movements of Postmodernism, New Urbanism, and New Classical Architecture, that established since the 1980s, a more classical approach came back to global skyscraper design, that is popular today.

=== 3 points of architecture ===
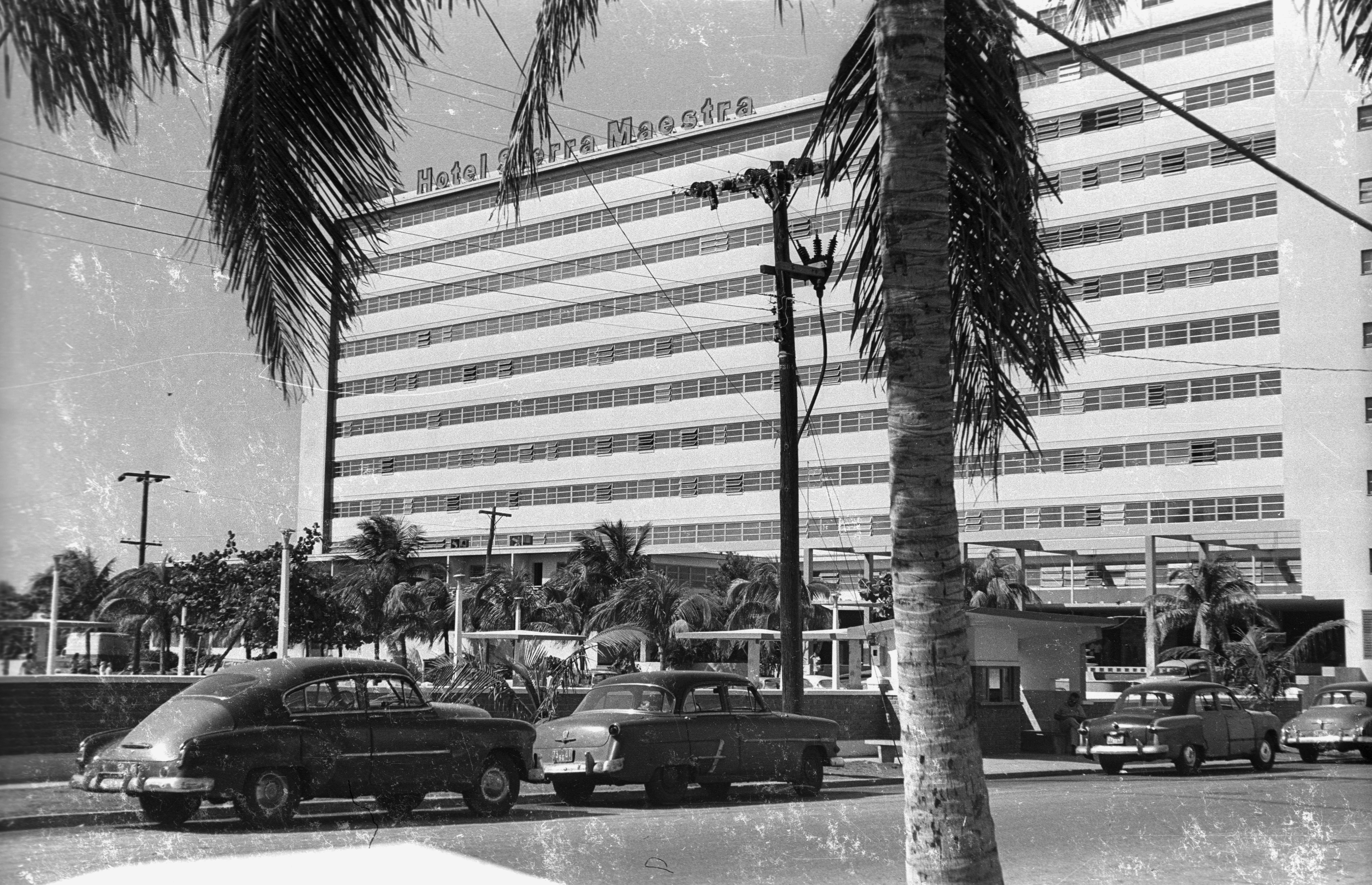
And the horizontal window, which cuts the façade along its entire length, lights rooms equally."

The Rosita De Hornedo building has different elevation treatments responding to the exposure of the sun. The north elevation has a view of the sea that gets little if any direct sun-light, it is here where most of the balconies in the building are located. The south elevation is part of, along with the detached structure which allows for a curtain wall construction, 3 out of the Five Points of Architecture: 1) The free designing of the ground plan—the absence of supporting walls—means the building is unrestrained in its internal use. 2) The free design of the façade—separating the exterior of the building from its structural function—sets the façade free from structural constraints. 3) And the horizontal window, which cuts the façade along its entire length, lights rooms equally. (Note: Early in his career, Le Corbusier developed a set of architectural principles that dictated his technique, which he called "the Five Points of a New Architecture" (French: cinq points de l'architecture moderne). They are considered to be most evident in his Villa Savoye. The five points are: Pilotis – Replacement of supporting walls by a grid of reinforced concrete columns that bears the structural load is the basis of the new aesthetic.; The free designing of the ground plan—the absence of supporting walls—means the house is unrestrained in its internal use.; The free design of the façade—separating the exterior of the building from its structural function—sets the façade free from structural constraints.; The horizontal window, which cuts the façade along its entire length, lights rooms equally.; Roof gardens on a flat roof can serve a domestic purpose while providing essential protection to the concrete roof.)

=== Massing ===
The architectural massing of the Rosita De Hornedo building is mainly composed of two perpendicular eleven floors, double-loaded, reinforced concrete slab sections of different heights set perpendicular to each other and forms, because of the unequal distribution of the rooms, a slightly elongated "T" on plan. The building slab parallel to 1st street has two different curtain wall facade treatments that respond to the orientation of the sun. The elevator core, located near the ground floor entrance, is the tallest point in the building, and along with the fire stairs on the west end, are expressed on the exterior massing of the building. The top two floors contain the circular and overhanging penthouses which are a radically different architectural treatment from the rest of the building and giving rise to the comparison of the Rosita De Hornedo to Erich Mendelsohn's De La Warr Pavilion, in Bexhill-on-Sea, East Sussex, England.

=== Exterior walls ===
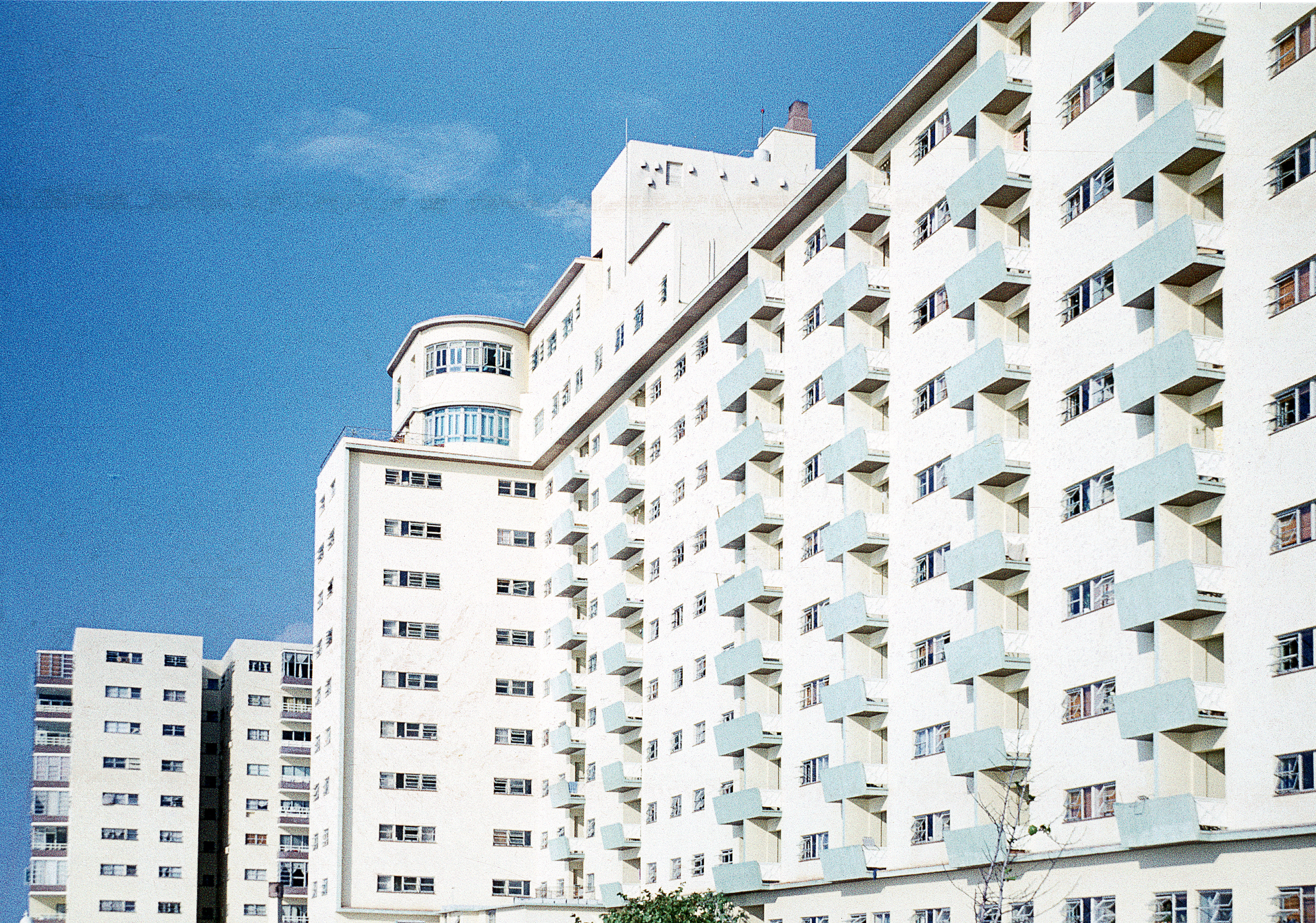
Rosita De Hornedo with the Riomar Building of 201 apartments, and by the same owner, in the background - view from the sea-side/swimmingpool-side.

The exterior walls of the Rosita De Hornedo are made up of a curtain wall system; the function of the exterior wall is only to keep the weather out and the occupants in; since the curtain wall is non-structural, they are made out of lightweight materials, thereby reducing construction costs. The curtain wall façade does not carry any structural load from the building other than its own dead load weight. The wall transfers lateral wind loads that are incident upon it to the main structure of the building through connections at floors or columns of the building. A curtain wall is designed to resist air and water infiltration, absorb sway induced by wind and seismic forces acting on the building, withstand wind loads, and support its own dead load weight forces. Curtain wall systems are typically designed with light framing members, although the first curtain walls were made with steel frames. The aluminum frame is typically infilled with glass, which provides an architecturally pleasing building, as well as benefits such as daylighting. However, the effects of light on visual comfort as well as solar heat gain in a building are more difficult to control when using large amounts of glass infill. Infill the Rosita De Hornedo include: precast, lightweight concrete veneer panels, window louvers, and operable strip windows on the south side of the building.

=== Curtain wall ===
Buildings have long been constructed with the exterior walls of the building supporting the load of the entire structure. The development and widespread use of structural steel and later reinforced concrete allowed relatively small columns to support large loads; hence, exterior walls of buildings were no longer required for structural support. The exterior walls could be non-load bearing and thus much lighter and more open than the masonry load-bearing walls of the past. This gave way to increased use of glass as an exterior façade, and the modern-day curtain wall was born.

== Attack of the Rosita De Hornedo ==
In August 1962, a group part of the Directorio Revolucionario Estudiantil (DRE) militants, travelled to Cuba from Miami in a small boat and attacked the Rosita de Hornedo building, known after the revolution as the Hotel Sierra Maestra, they fired a cannon, terrorizing the guests of the Hotel, then fled back to the United States. Among the DRE militants was José Basulto. (Note: " That is my best friend, Manuel Guillot Castellanos. He was the chief of the underground network in Cuba. He was arrested after the Bay of Pigs." Basulto shows me a souvenir of the attack on the Hornedo de Rosita Hotel: an eight-inch cannon shell, the only one that he didn't fire that night so long ago. Basulto's wife, Rita, arrives with their newest grandson, Rogelio, who is barely a year old. Basulto puts the bullet down and plucks the babe from his stroller, hugging him, cooing over him, murmuring endearments. "This is my treasure," he says. Basulto wants to say one more thing. It concerns his attack on the Hornedo de Rosita Hotel 35 years ago. "Did you know that a few weeks after we hit the hotel," Basulto says, "Castro sent Guillot, my best friend, to the firing squad. In revenge for our attack. "You think I don't have a burden?" he asks. The truth is that Jose Basulto has a lot of dead friends. Jefferson Morley is an editor in The Post's Outlook section. CAPTION: Jose Basulto, a co-founder of the Miami-based pilots organization Brothers to the Rescue, has campaigned against Fidel Castro's communist regime since coming to the United States in 1959. CAPTION: Brothers to the Rescue traces its roots to the early '60s. Counterclockwise from right: Brigade 2506, an exile army sponsored by the CIA; Juan Salvat, left, and Basulto in August 1962; a satirical anti-Castro publication; an as-told-to Miami Herald article by Basulto; and Felix Rodriguez, a friend of Basulto's who served with him in the U.S. Army. CAPTION: Brothers to the Rescue, or Hermanos al Rescate, was all but put out of business by a U.S. immigration deal with Cuba in 1995, but Basulto, left, continued his anti-Castro flights. Opposite page, top to bottom: a memorial to the four pilots killed in the 1996 shootdown; an oil painting depicting a friend of Basulto's who was executed in 1962; and a recovered raft.") Since the Cuban Revolution, Basulto participated in various activities intended to subvert or overthrow the Cuban government. After the revolution, he was trained by the CIA in intelligence, communications, explosives, sabotage and subversion in Panama, Guatemala, and the United States. He was later placed back into Cuba, posing as a physics student at the University of Santiago to help prepare the ground for the Bay of Pigs Invasion. In 1961, under CIA sponsorship, Basulto infiltrated Cuba for a commando operation intended to sabotage an alleged missile site, a mission which was ultimately aborted. In August 1962 he was involved in an expedition of the Directorio Revolucionario Estudantil which took a boat to Cuba and fired a 20 mm cannon at the Rosita De Hornedo hotel, though nobody was killed in the incident.

== Gallery ==
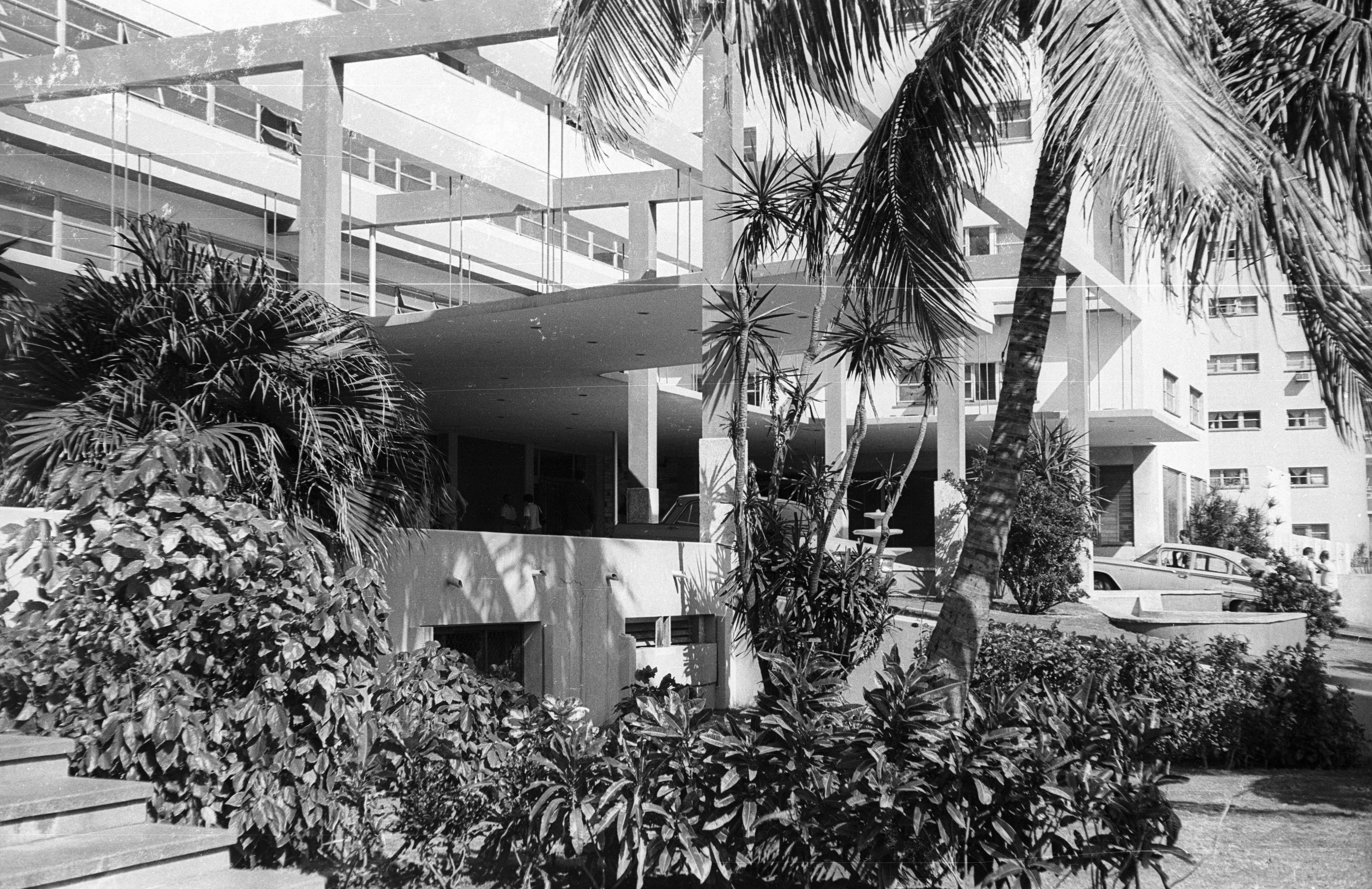
Rosita De Hornedo

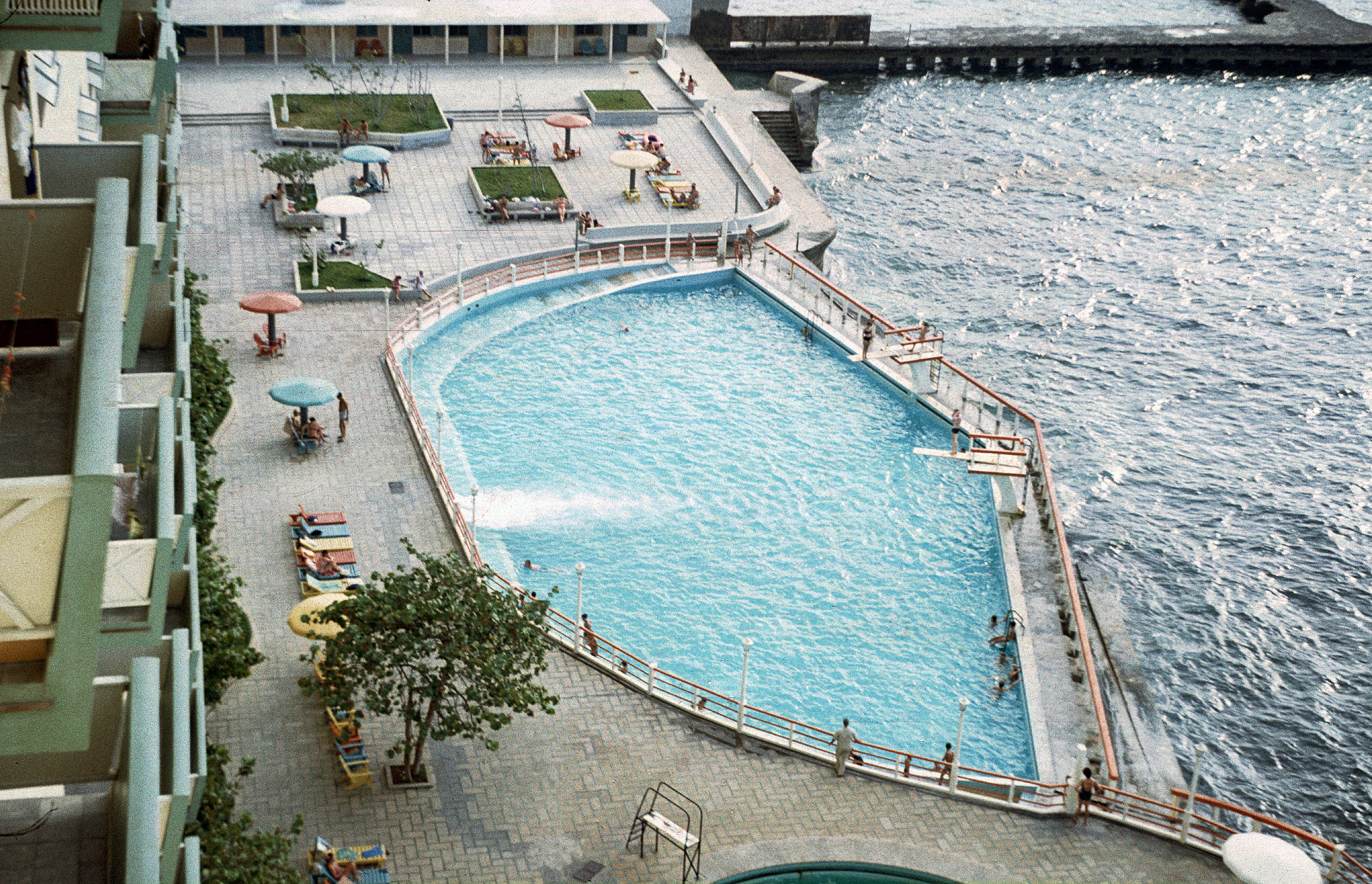
Rosita De Hornedo

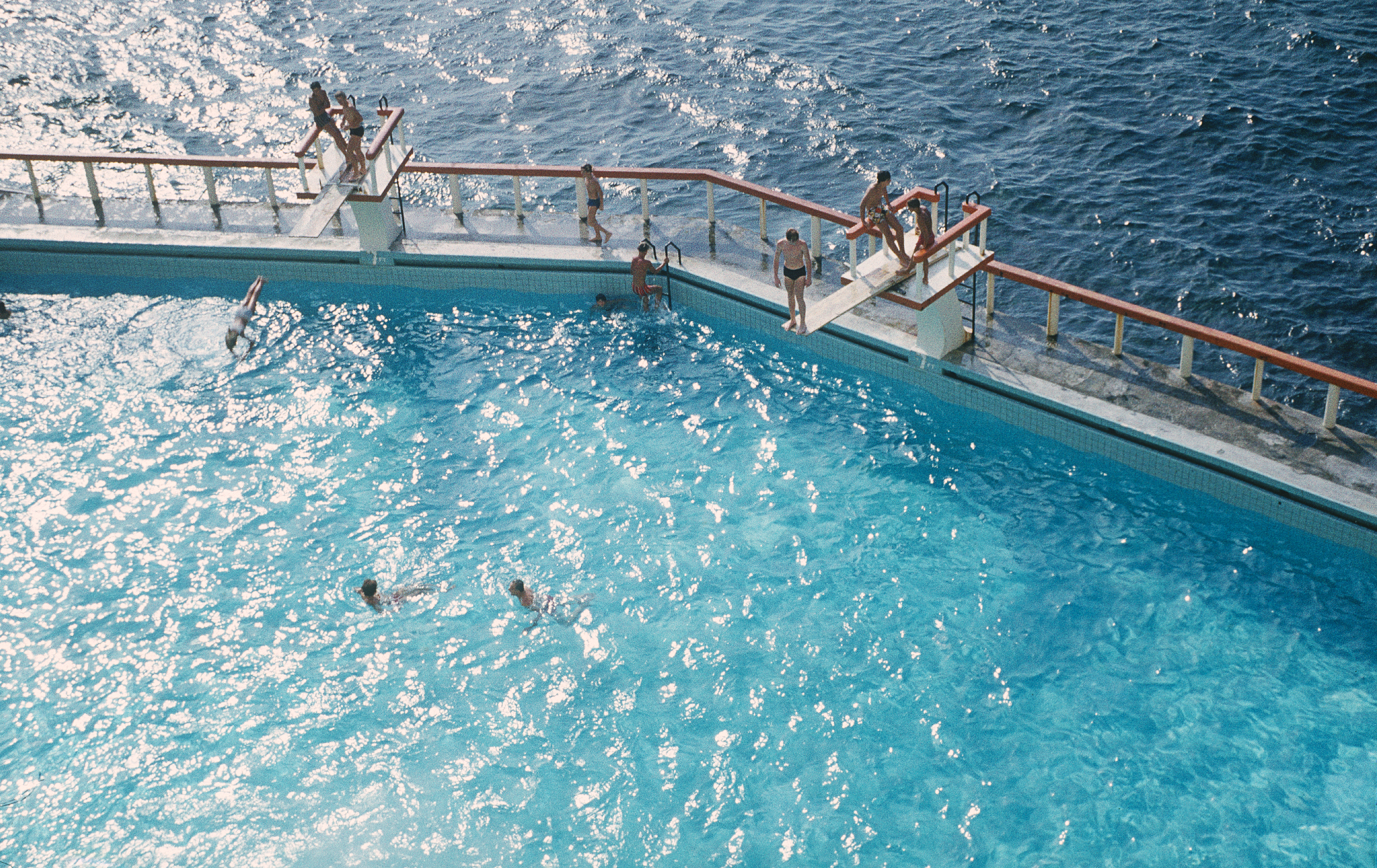
Rosita De Hornedo

== See also ==
- Alfredo Hornedo
- Edificio del Seguro Médico, Havana
- FOCSA Building
- Radiocentro CMQ Building

== Bibliography ==
- Breitschmid, Markus (2017). "Alpine Architecture – Bruno Taut", in: Disegno – Quarterly Journal for Design, No. 14, London (Spring 2017), pp. 62–70.
- Rauhut, Christoph and Lehmann, Niels (2015). Fragments of Metropolis Berlin, Hirmer Publishers 2015, ISBN 978-3777422909
- Stissi, Vladimir (2007). Amsterdam, het mekka van de volkshuisvesting, 1909-1942 (Amsterdam, the Mecca of Social Housing, 1909-1942), Dutch language, more than 500 ill., NAi Rotterdam.
- Frampton, Kenneth (2004). Modern architecture - a critical history, Third edition, World of Art, ISBN 0-500-20257-5
- Benson, Timothy. O. (); et al. (2001-09-17). Expressionist Utopias: Paradise, Metropolis, Architectural Fantasy (Weimar and Now: German Cultural Criticism). University of California Press. ISBN 0-520-23003-5.
- Bullock, Alan; Stallybrass, Oliver; Trombley, Stephen, eds. (1988). The Fontana Dictionary of Modern Thought (Paperback). Fontana press. p. 918 pages. ISBN 0-00-686129-6.
- Jencks, Charles (1986). Modern Movements in Architecture, Second edition, Penguin, ISBN 0-14-009963-8
- Whyte, Iain Boyd ed. (1985). Crystal Chain Letters: Architectural Fantasies by Bruno Taut and His Circle, The MIT Press, ISBN 0-262-23121-2
- Bletter, Rosemarie Haag (Summer 1983). "Expressionism and the New Objectivity", in: Art Journal, 43:2 (Summer 1983), pp. 108–120.
- Pehnt, Wolfgang (1973). Expressionist Architecture, Thames and Hudson, ISBN 0-500-34058-7
- Banham, Reyner (1972). Theory and Design in the First Machine Age, Third edition, Praeger Publishers Inc., ISBN 0-85139-632-1
- Sharp, Dennis (1966). Modern Architecture and Expressionism, George Braziller New
