= Rolando Antonio Pérez Fernández =

Cuban musician (born 1947)

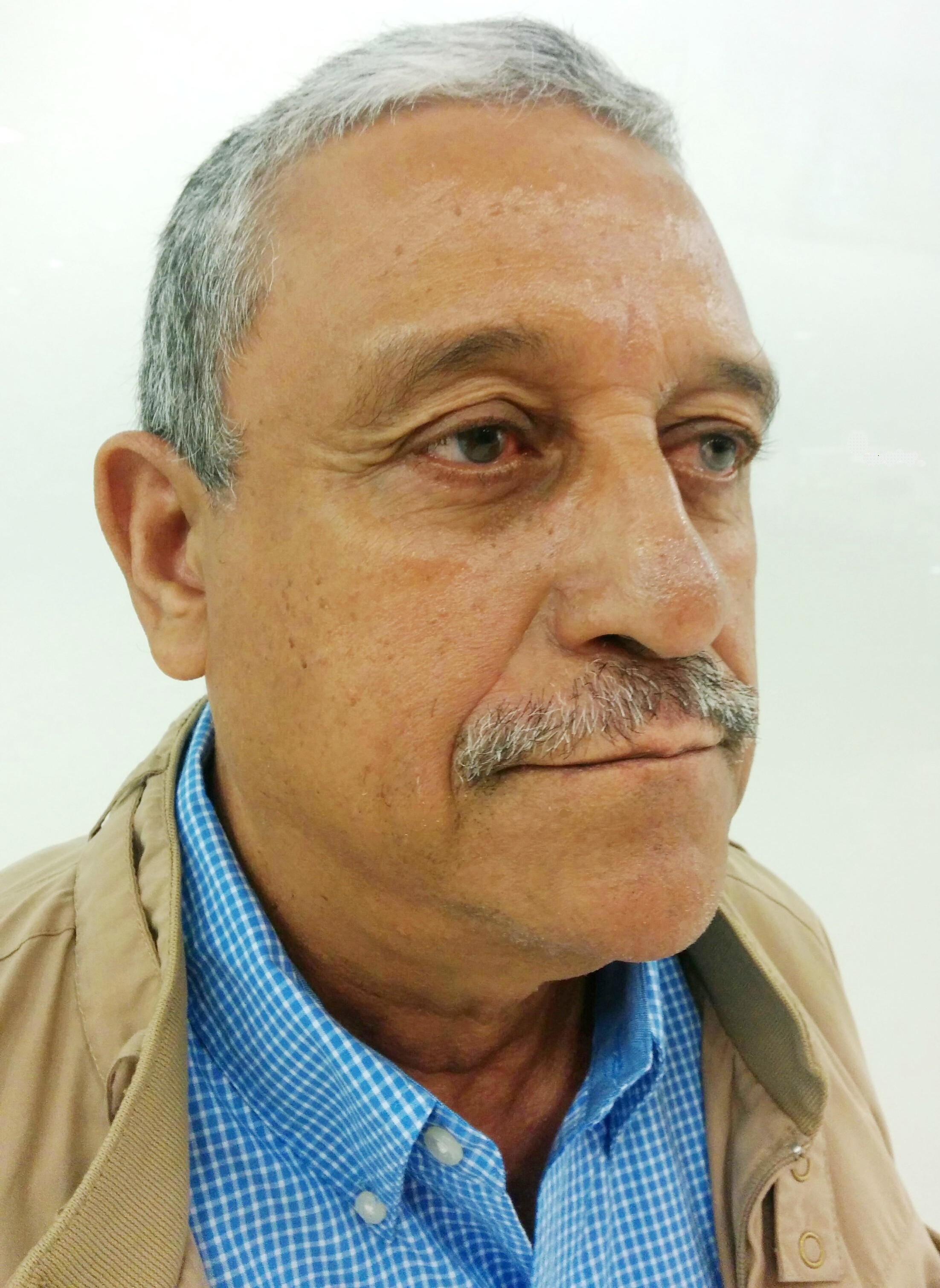
- Rolando Antonio Pérez Fernández
- Born: 1947 (age 78–79); Santiago de Cuba, Cuba
- Education: Instituto Superior de Arte
- Occupations: Professor, musicologist, musician
- Musical career
- Instrument: Cello
- Formerly of: National Symphony Orchestra of Cuba

Rolando Antonio Pérez Fernández (born 1947, Santiago de Cuba, Cuba) is a Cuban musicologist, cellist and professor.

== Academic background ==
Rolando Pérez initiated his musical studies in Santiago de Cuba, where he also began his career as cellist under the guidance of distinguished performer and professor Ernesto Xancó. In 1976 he graduated from Music Medium Level in the specialty of violoncello at Havana Municipal Conservatory "Amadeo Roldán". This same year, after the inauguration of the Instituto Superior de Arte (ISA) and the School of Musicology in the same educational institution, Rolando Pérez began his studies in that area, which was founded by Cuban musicologist Argeliers León. After concluding his studies, Pérez received the degree of Licenciado en Música with a specialization in musicology from the Instituto Superior de Arte. In 1999, he also received the degree of Doctor en Ciencias del Arte from the same educational institution.

== Work as cellist ==
Rolando Pérez served as cellist in the Cuban National Symphony Orchestra from 1969 to 1981, as well as between 1987 and 1992. He has also participated in ensembles and recordings of concert and popular music such as: "Cuarteto de cuerdas" by Carlos Malcolm, "El ropavejero" by Francisco Barrios, and "El Mastuerzo" together with the Mexican rock group Botellita de Jerez.

== Work as musicologist ==
As musicological researcher, Pérez has collaborated with the Research and Development Center of Music from 1981 to 1987. He has also participated as speaker in numerous congresses and lectures, including the Interdisciplinary Colloquium on Rhythm at the University of Salamanca (1993); Latin American Meeting on Religion and Ethnicity at the Pontificia Universidad Javeriana, Bogotá (1996); International Conference on Musical Cultures of Latin America: Global Effects, Past and Present at University of California, Los Angeles (1999); Society for Ethnomusicology South East and Caribbean Chapter Annual Meeting at Florida State University (2002); International Congress of the Latin American Association of Afro-Asian Studies at the National Autonomous University of Mexico (2003); IASPM Latin American Branch Congress, Havana (2006); and the 2nd Venezuelan Congress of Popular Music in Caracas (2006).

== Work as professor ==
From 1993 until the present, Rolando Pérez has worked as professor in the area of Ethnomusicology at the National School of Music of the Universidad Nacional Autónoma de México (UNAM), where he currently holds tenure as "Profesor de Tiempo Completo, Titular ‘A’ Interino."

== Publications ==
Throughout his long career as musicologist and researcher, Pérez has published the following books: La binarización de los ritmos ternarios africanos en América Latina (Casa de las Américas, Havana, 1987) and La música afromestiza mexicana (Universidad Veracruzana, 1990). In the first of those books (which won the musicology award from Casa de las Américas in 1982), he proposes a theory which is deeply rooted in the musicological problematic of Latin America and a methodology which could be developed in comparative studies created within the Continent. The text consists of three chapters in which the author begins by analyzing general aspects related to the presence of the African population in Latin America, his contributions to music and to the socio-historical context within which those processes have evolved. In the second chapter he describes in detail the characteristics of the African rhythm style and its fusion with the Hispanic style. In the third chapter he develops his own personal conclusions about what he describes as: "the binarization process of the African ternary rhythms", their specific behavior and the consequences of this process for the cultural development of the musical culture in Cuba and Latin America. His reflections are illustrated with numerous musical examples. In his second book, Pérez demonstrates the importance of the African contribution to the integration of the music of Mexico, as well as provides facts that may support, within the musicological field, the conclusions of Mexican anthropologist Gonzalo Aguirre Beltrán in reference to the concept that the Mexican creole music is fundamentally a result of the cultural fusion between the Spanish and the African population.

In addition, Pérez has written numerous articles and book chapters, not just focused in the African musical contributions in Latin America, but also extending his interest to linguistics, epistemology and history. He has also written about the contribution of the Chinese musical traditions to the Cuban culture.

These works include

- La corneta china (suona) en Cuba: Una contribución asiática trascendente.
- De China a Cuba: una mirada a su etnomusicología.
- El culto a la Guadalupe entre los indios de El Caney.
- Notas en torno al origen kimbundu de la voz fandango.
- El verbo chingar: una palabra clave.
- El Chuchumbé y la buena palabra. (parts 1 and 2).

The outstanding work of Pérez constitutes an important point of reference for current and future investigations focusing on the study of the African influence in the music of Latin America. In this regard, his ideas, articles and books have been commented, quoted and reviewed within and outside of the Americas by several prominent researchers such as: Steven Loza, James Robbins, José Jorge de Carvalho, Isabel Aretz, Kofi Agawu, Ángel G. Quintero Rivera, Juan Pablo González, Antonio García de León, Helmut Enrique Greiner, Carlos Reynoso and Gonzalo Aguirre Beltrán, among others.

== See also ==
- Music of Cuba
