= Porcellis =

Porcellis is a surname. Notable people with the surname include:

- Jan Porcellis (c. 1580/54–1632), Dutch marine painter
- Julius Porcellis (c. 1610/19–1645), Dutch marine painter, son of Jan
- Rafael Porcellis (born 1987), Brazilian football player

== See also ==
- Porcelli
- Porcel
