= Alfredo Hornedo =

Senator of the liberal party

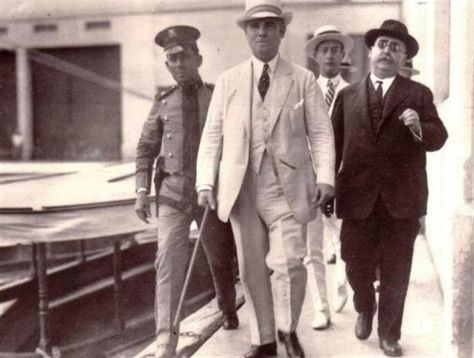
- Born: August 20, 1882; Havana, Cuba
- Died: March 17, 1964 (aged 81); Miami, Florida
- Occupation(s): Politician, businessman
- Known for: Signatory of the 1940 Cuban Constitution
- Notable work: Teatro Blanquita, Hotel Rosita Hornedo, Riomar Building Mercado Único, Mercado de Carlos III, Casino Deportivo. News papers: El Pais, Excelsior, El Sol, El Crisol

Alfredo Hornedo y Suárez was a senator of the Liberal Party. Owner of the Mercado Único, the Mercado de Carlos III, the Casino Deportivo of Havana, and the news papers El Pais, Excelsior, El Sol, and El Crisol. He built the Teatro Blanquita, the Hotel Rosita Hornedo, and the Riomar Building. (Note: The Hornedo family were the owners of the Rosita de Hornedo and the larger (201 apts.), poured concrete Riomar Building also by the architect Cristóbal Martínez Márquez, located in the adjoining lot to the east.) He owned various radio stations.

== History ==
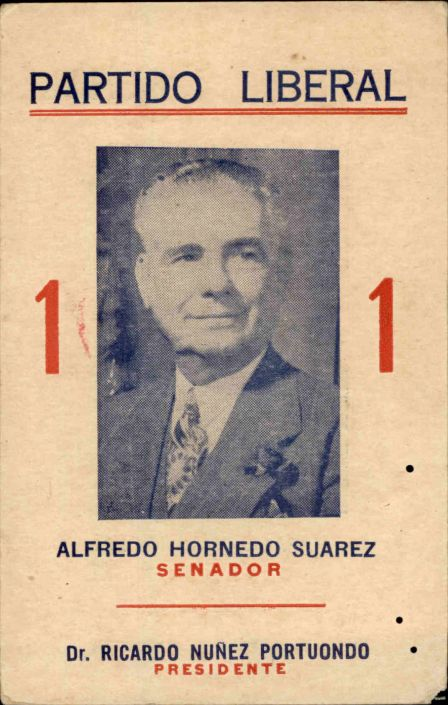
Alfredo Hornedo Suarez, Havana Senator

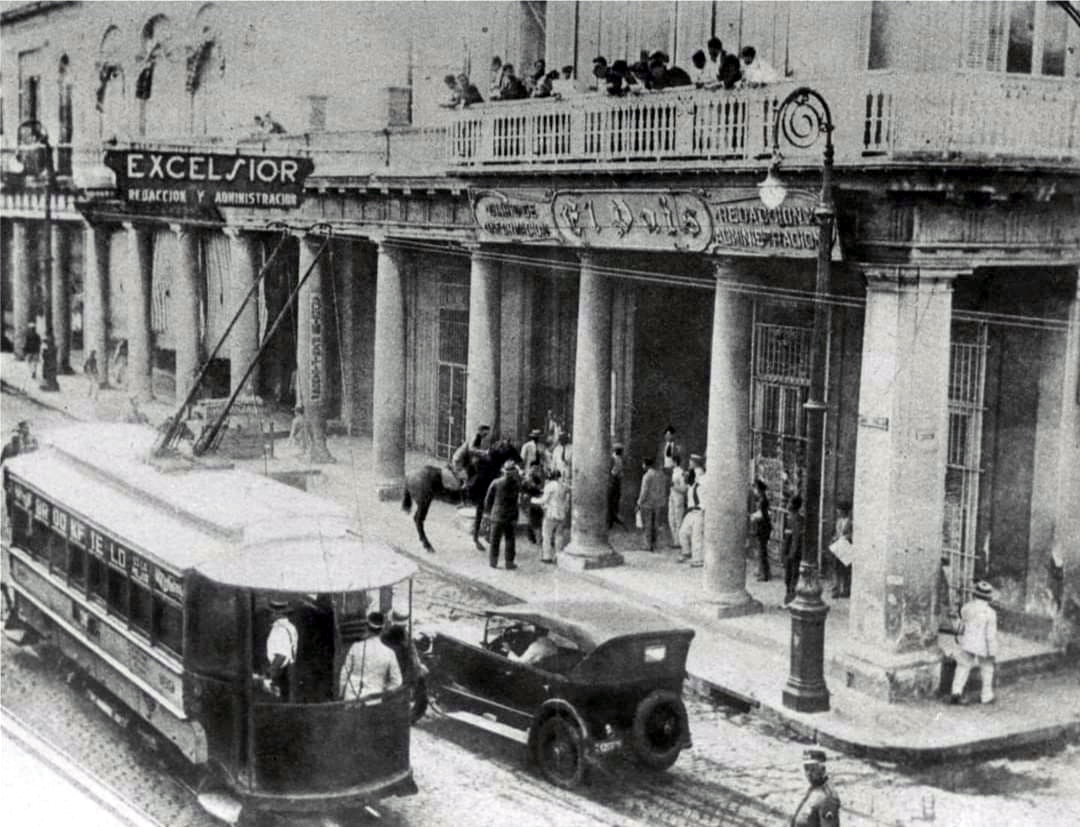
Newspapers of Alfredo Hornedo, Excelsior, and El Pais, on Calle Galiano corner of Calle Concordia, Havana, Cuba.

Alfredo Hornedo entered politics, elected by the Liberal Party, first in 1914, as councilman of the City of Havana, until he became a senator; elected 1938 and reelected in 1944 and 1948. He was also delegated to the Constitutional Assembly of 1940 and presided over the Liberal Party between 1939 and 1947. Alfredo Hornedo was an ingenious and lucid politician and businessman who, although he had a humble childhood selling oranges on the streets of Havana, began to work as a coachman for the Maruri family. The Maruri couple had a daughter, Blanquita, the young lady of the house, who fell in love with Hornedo and they ended up getting married. Although the social position and heritage of his in-laws favored him, Hornedo, with intelligence and skill, in a very short time, made the Maruri fortune grow, living together as a successful investor.

According to a 1938 intelligence report compiled by the U.S. War Department, a secret Nazi organization in Cuba headed by German ambassador Hans Hermann Voelckers boasted of Senator Alfredo's support.

The historian of Havana, Eusebio Leal, remembers Hornedo dressed in gray, in a waistcoat. He was of medium height, and “the silver of his hair and the tan of his skin made him almost fascinating in the eyes of the child who was watching him. At his side, a servant or butler carried some very fine Carmelite dogs and extended a roll of paper with nickels that Alfredo Hornedo would soon distribute among the neighborhood children who at times sneaked into the patio of his mansion, located in Carlos III and Castillejo, to greet him and wait for the gift with which the millionaire rewarded them".

Leal continues: “Something strange evoked the humble past of that man. Another servant brought a small tray, on which, steaming, an ancient and polished güira gourd oscillated, with coffee, which he drank".

== Business ==
In 1957, Hornedo built the Rosita De Hornedo building. He also owned the newspapers El País on Calle Galiano, moved to Calle Reina, the Excélsior newspaper, and the Mercado Único of La Habana, named the building after his second wife, Rosita Almanza; he built other properties in the area including the larger (201 apartments) Riomar Building, (Note: U.S. FOREIGN CLAIMS SETTLEMENT, Apartment 752 of Riomar Building, First Avenue, Marianao.) also by the architect Cristóbal Martínez Márquez and located in the adjoining lot. Alfredo Hornedo y Suárez was the owner of the Blanquita theater which opened in 1950, now the Karl Marx Theatre, and the Sports Casino, which is today the social circle Cristino Naranjo.

== Gallery ==
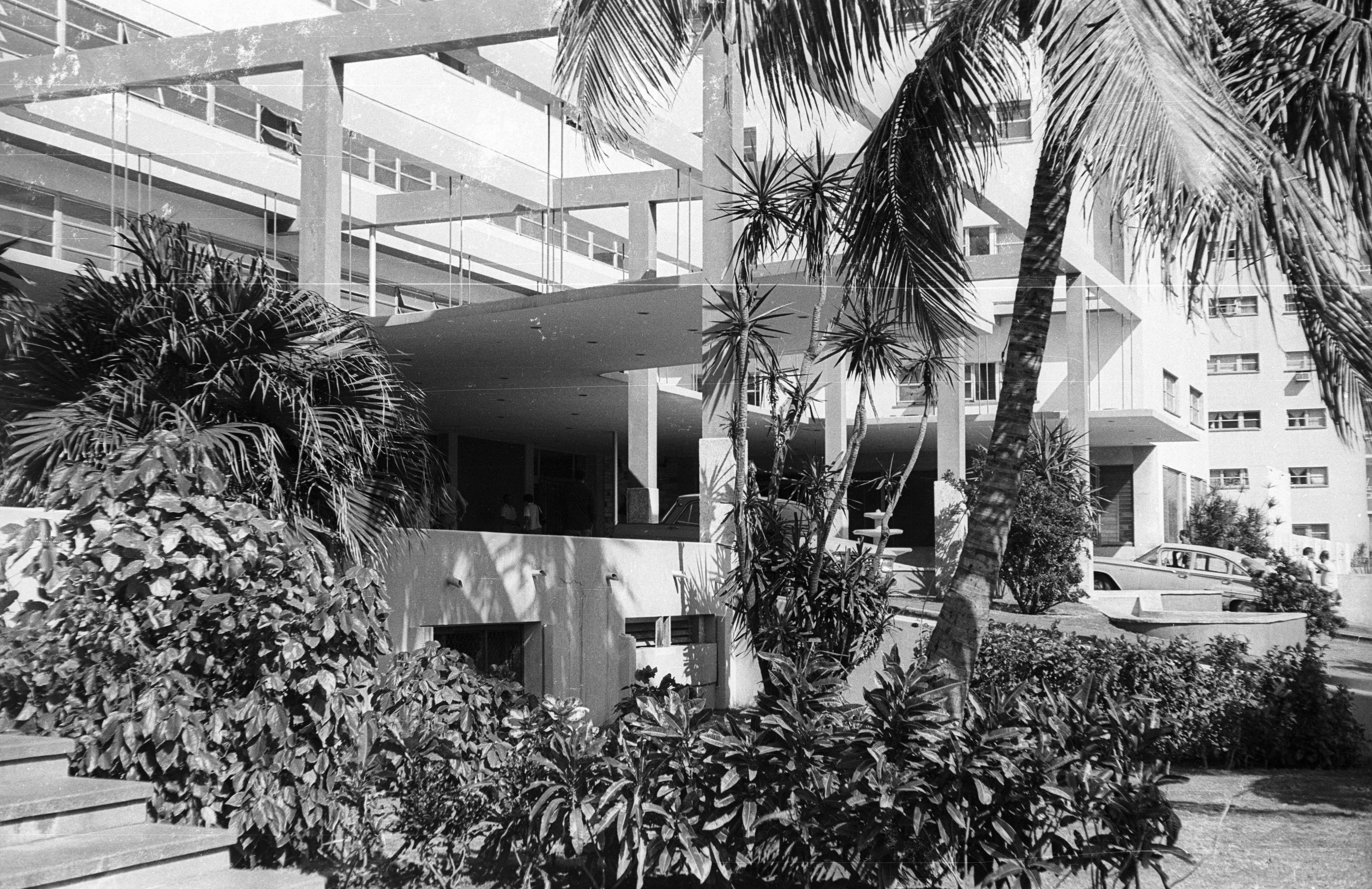
Rosita De Hornedo

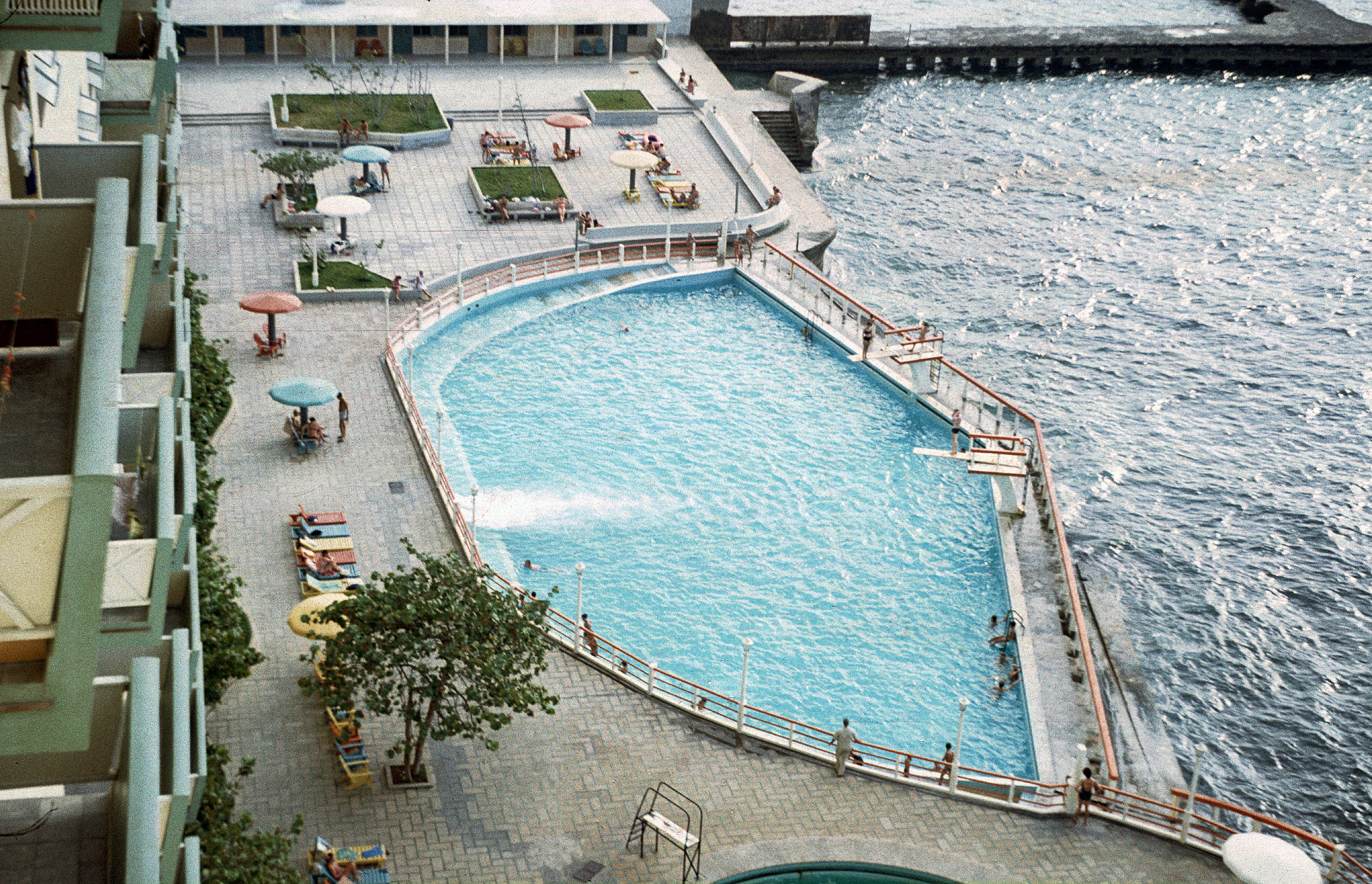
Rosita De Hornedo

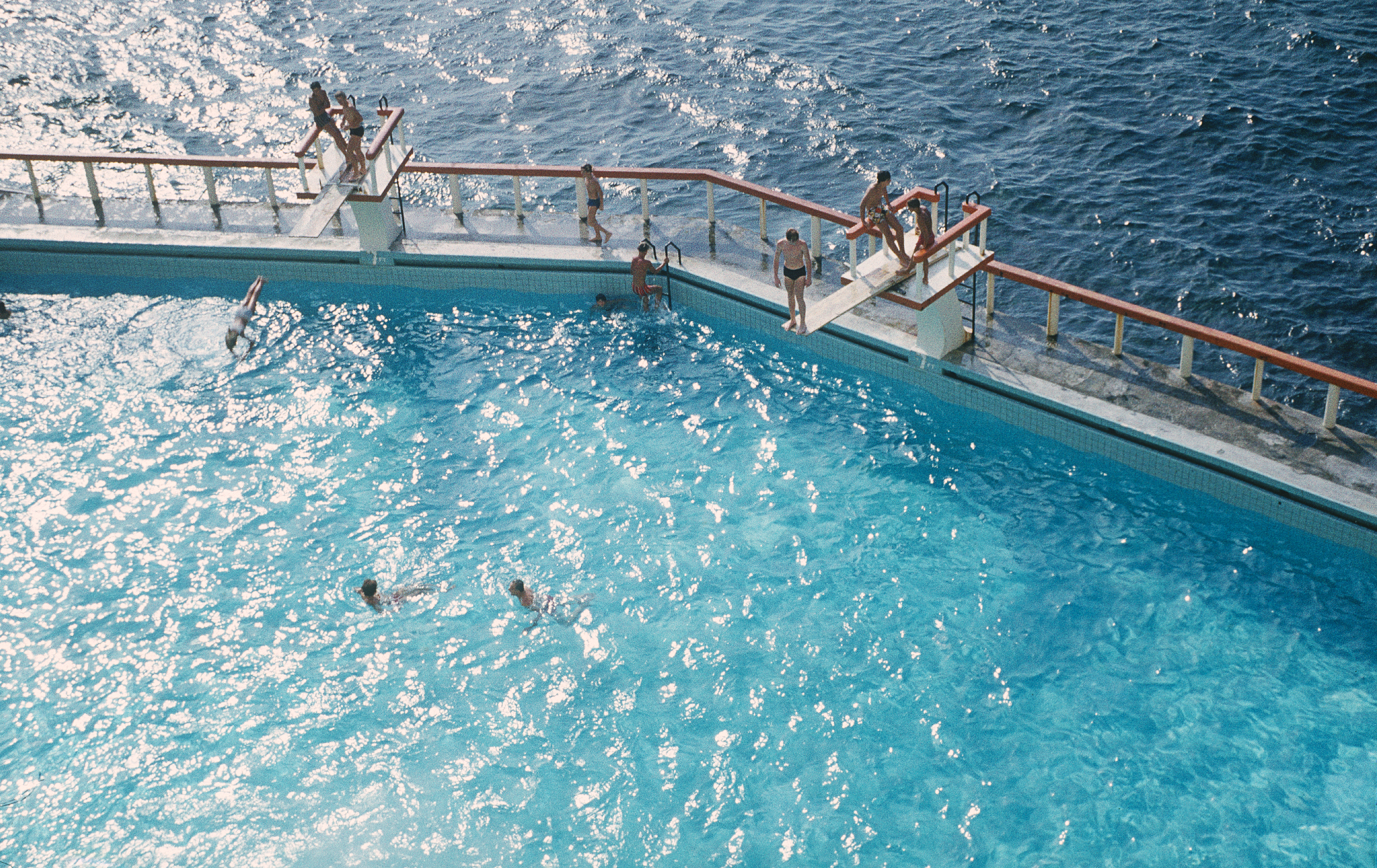
Rosita De Hornedo

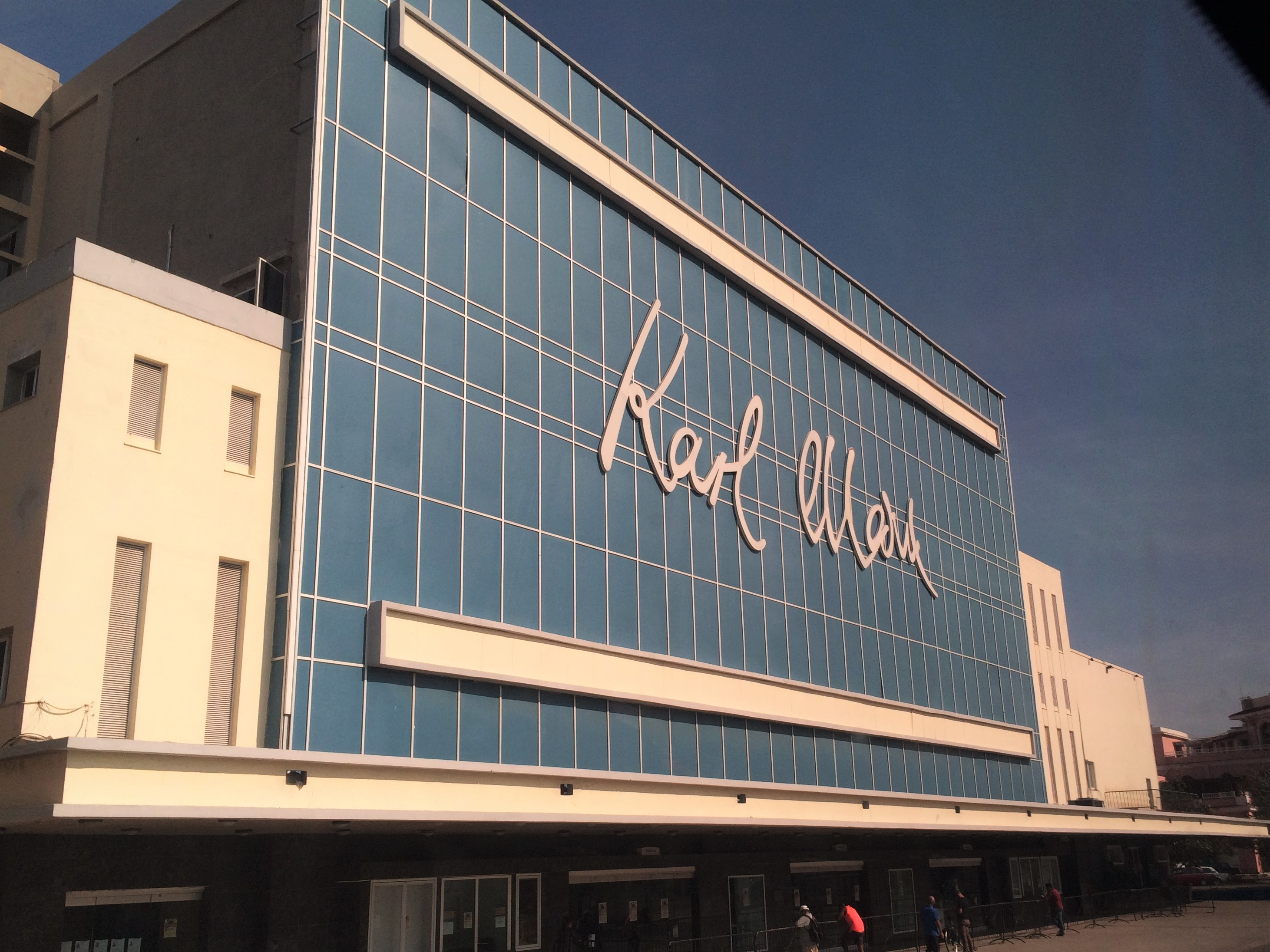
Teatro Blanquita presently the Karl Marx Theatre

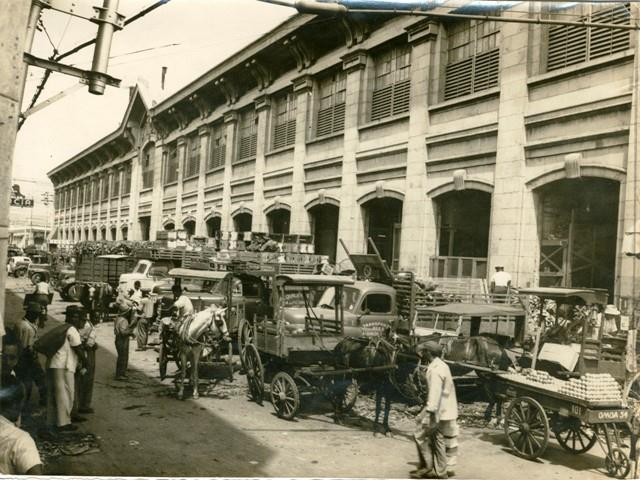
Mercado Único de La Habana

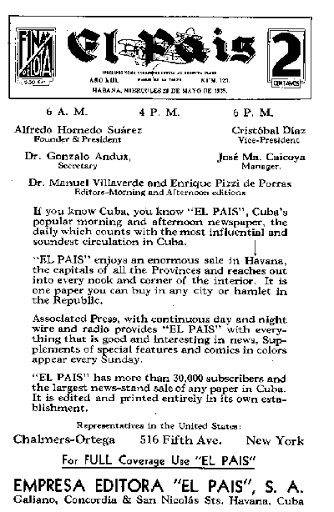
Copy of El Pais Newspaper, 1938.

== See also ==
- Rosita De Hornedo
- Karl Marx Theatre
- 1940 Constitution of Cuba
