= Amadeo Roldán Theatre =

Theatre in Havana, Cuba

Coordinates: 23.1411°N 82.3968°W

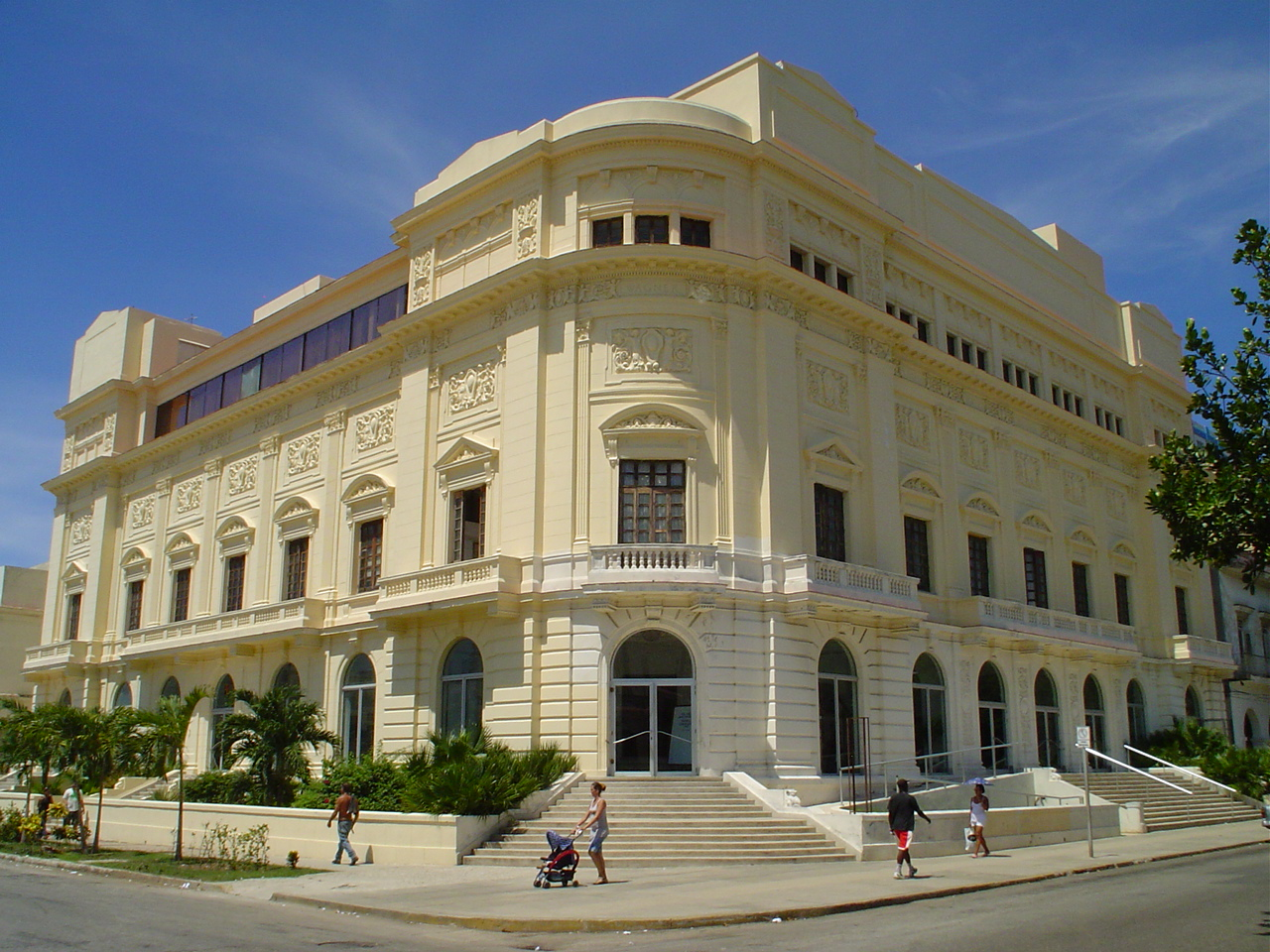
Amadeo Roldán Theatre in Havana, Cuba

The Amadeo Roldán Theatre (Spanish: Teatro Amadeo Roldán) is a theatre in Havana, Cuba built in 1929. The theatre was destroyed in 1977 by a pyromaniac; it was re-opened in 1999 as the head office of the National Symphony Orchestra of Cuba which performs seasonal every Sunday at 11:00PM.

Located within a monumental modern building, once home to The Havana Auditorium, the venue now consists of the Amadeo Roldán and García Caturla halls, offering symphonic orchestras, piano recitals, and a mixture of classical and contemporary music. The Amadeo Roldán hall has seats for 886, for important concerts such as Egberto Gismonti and Leo Brouwer, the Caturla hall is for small band performances and has a capacity for 276 persons. The theatre apart from being home of the National Symphony Orchestra is also home to prestigious international events such as the "Encuentro Internacional de Guitarra" (International Guitar Gathering).

== Address ==
Calzada, e/Calle D y Calle E, Vedado, Havana 10400
