= Karl Marx Theatre =

Theatre in Havana, Cuba

- Teatro Karl Marx
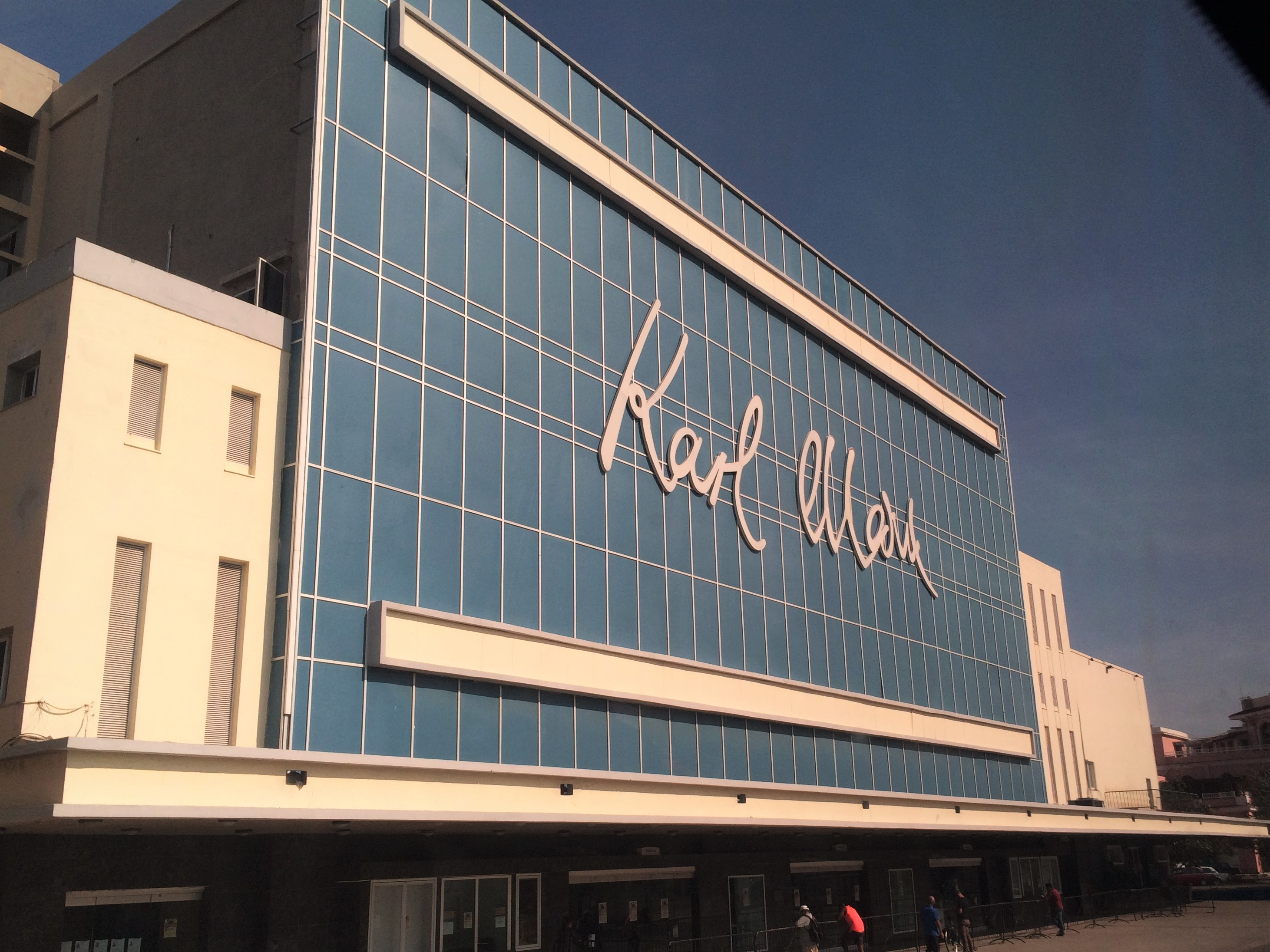
- Interactive map of Karl Marx Theatre
- Former names: Teatro Blanquita
- Address: Ave 1ª, entre 8 y 10; Havana; Cuba
- Coordinates: 23.12944°N 82.41963°W
- Capacity: 5,500

The Karl Marx Theatre (Spanish: Teatro Karl Marx) is a theatre in Havana, Cuba. It was originally known as the Teatro Blanquita, owned and built by Alfredo Hornedo, renamed to the Teatro Charles Chaplin following the Cuban Revolution of 1959, and was named after Karl Marx in 1975.

The venue has an auditorium, with seating capacity of 5,500 people, and is used for shows by stars from Cuba and other countries. In 1956, Liberace appeared on stage as part of his first international tour.

== See also ==
- Rosita De Hornedo
