= Antonio Porcelli =

Italian painter

Antonio Porcelli (1800–1870) was an Italian painter. He painted both landscape and figures in genre scenes. Some of the paintings have been described as of "historic or fantastic themes" including one titled Il nano misterioso nella spianata di Pietra Nera based on a Walter Scott story (Museo d'arte della città di Ravenna). He was inscribed in 1838 in the Congregazione dei Virtuosi al Pantheon. Other notes describe him as a painter of bambocciate.

== Works ==
- A peddler
- Joseph with Jesus as a child
- IL BARBIERE, 1835
- Two octagonal temperas on parchement with birds and animals on branches of fruit trees, 1657
