= Amadeo Roldán =

Cuban musician

Amadeo Roldán y Gardes (Paris, 12 June 1900 – Havana, 7 March 1939) was a Cuban composer and violinist. Roldán was born in Paris to a Cuban mulatta and a Spanish father. It was his mother, the pianist Albertina Gardes, who initiated her children to music (his sister María Teresa was a mezzo-soprano and his brother Alberto a cellist).

Roldán came to Cuba in 1919 after studying music theory and violin at the Madrid Conservatory, graduating in 1916. He became the concertmaster (leader of the first-violin section) of the new Orquesta Sinfónica de la Habana in 1922. In the mid-1920s he was appointed concertmaster of the Orquesta Filarmónica of Havana (he would assume the position of conductor in 1932) and founded the Havana String Quartet.

During this period, Roldán, one of the leaders of the Afrocubanismo movement, wrote the first symphonic pieces to incorporate Afro-Cuban percussion instruments. Roldán's best-known composition is the 1928 ballet La Rebambaramba, described by a critic of the era as "a multicolored musicorama ... depicting an Afro-Cuban fiesta in a gorgeous display of Caribbean melorhythms, with the participation of a multifarious fauna of native percussion effects, including a polydental glissando on the jawbone of an ass."

Roldán's compositions included Overture on Cuban Themes (1925), three little poems: (Oriente, Pregón, Fiesta negra: 1926), and two ballets: La Rebambaramba (a ballet colonial in two parts: 1928) and El milagro de Anaquille (1929). There followed a series of Rítmicas (1930), Poema negra (1930) and Tres toques (march, rites, dance) (1931). The fifth and sixth of his Rítmicas, composed around the same time as Edgard Varèse's Ionisation, were among the first works in the Western classical music tradition scored for percussion ensemble alone. In Motivos de son (1934) he wrote eight pieces for voice and instruments based on the poet Nicolas Guillen's set of poems with the same title. His last composition was two Piezas infantiles for piano (1937). His work was regularly featured in concerts sponsored by the Pan-American Association of Composers, founded by Henry Cowell, including the inaugural, March 1929 performance in New York.

Roldán died at the peak of his creative powers at 38, of a disfiguring facial cancer (he had been an inveterate smoker). His career followed a similar path to Alejandro García Caturla, and the two men are considered to be pioneers of modern Cuban symphonic art.

== See also ==
- Amadeo Roldán Theater
