= Alejandro García Caturla =

Cuban composer (1906–1940)

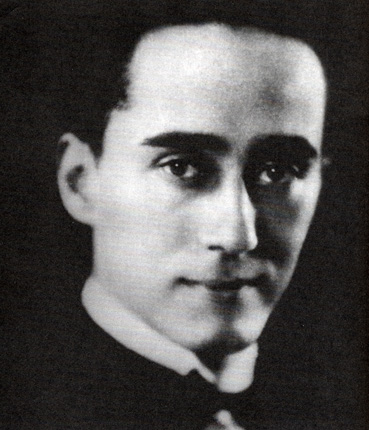
Alejandro García Caturla

Alejandro García Caturla (7 March 1906 – 12 November 1940) was a Cuban composer of art music and creolized Cuban themes.

== Biography ==
Caturla was born in the town of Remedios, Villa Clara, Cuba. At only sixteen years old, in 1922, he won a position as a member of the 2nd violins of the newly formed “Orquesta Sinfónica de La Habana”, where Amadeo Roldán was the concertmaster. He started to write music since he was a teenager, while studying both music and law. He felt attracted to Afro-Cuban rhythms since he was really young, and this became a common denominator in his compositions in a time when the division between art music and popular music did not influence Cuban composers. From 1925 to 1927 he continued his musical studies in Paris as a student of Nadia Boulanger.

Together with composer Amadeo Roldán, Caturla became the leader of Afro-cubanismo, a nationalist musical trend, which mixed elements of white and black culture, incorporating Afro-Cuban songs, rhythms, and dances. Later on he used advanced techniques and French Impressionist styles combined with primitive tunes; as a result, some of his works show surprising juxtapositions of chords and moods. He composed Concierto de cámara, Obertura cubana, Danzas cubanas, and a suite for orchestra (1938). Many vocal works were inspired by Cuban poets such as Alejo Carpentier and Nicolás Guillén; other works include one string quartet (1927), Bembé, for fourteen instruments, and Primera suite cubana (1930) among others. He produced numerous piano works, among them Danza lucumí (1928) and Sonata (1939).

After finishing his musical studies, Caturla returned to his home town, where he continued his composition career and started practicing law to provide for his growing family. His Tres Danzas Cubanas for symphony orchestra was first performed in Spain in 1929. Bembe premiered in Havana the same year. In 1932 he founded the Caibarien Concert Society, whose orchestra he conducted on many occasions, making known the music of Falla, Ravel and Debussy. His Obertura Cubana won first prize in a national contest in 1938. García Caturla was also a multi-instrumental performer and a baritone of some quality.

García Caturla left two legacies: One as a universal musician who combined classical and folkloric themes with modern musical ideas through his compositions and knowledge of at least seven different instruments. His career paralleled with Amadeo Roldán’s, and the two men are considered pioneers of modern Cuban symphonic art. His other legacy is one of serving justice, first as an attorney and later as a judge. While presiding over a criminal case, García Caturla was murdered at thirty-four by the young gambler he was about to sentence to prison.

Father of Teté Caturla.

== Works ==
No quiere juego con tu marido (Danza cubana no. 1), 1924

La viciosa (Danza cubana no. 2), 1924

La número tres (Danza cubana no. 3), 1924

Cuentos musicales. Escanas infantiles, 1925

Danza del Tambor

Danza Lucumí

Tres Preludios, 1925

Tres danzas cubanas, 1927

Obertura cubana, 1928

Comparsa (a Fernando Ortiz), 1930

Preludio Homenaje a Changó, 1936

Berceuse para dormir a un negrito, 1937

Berceuse Campesina, 1938
