= Argeliers León =

Cuban composer and musicologist

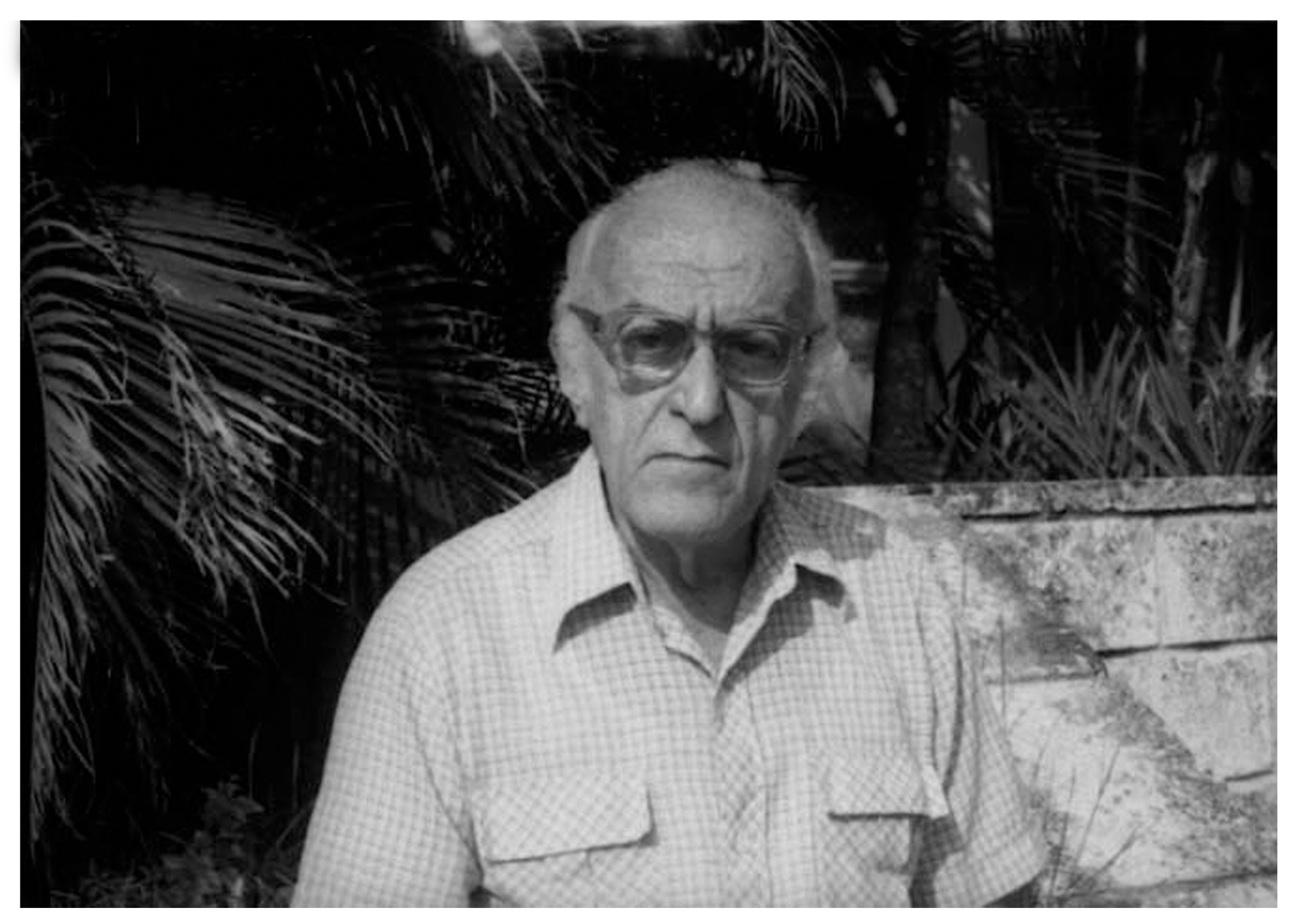
Argeliers Leon, Musicologist, Composer and Ethnographer

Argeliers León Pérez (7 May 1918 – 23 February 1991) was a Cuban composer and musicologist.

== Academic Background ==
He studied music at the Municipal Conservatory of Havana, Pedagogy at the University of Havana and completed specialized studies during summer courses at the University of Havana and the Universidad de Concepción in Chile. He studied composition with Joseph Ardévol in Cuba and in Paris with Nadia Boulanger, ethnology and folklore with Don Fernando Ortiz and María Muñoz de Quevedo.

== Composer ==
Argeliers León was a member of "Grupo de Renovación Musical", which served as a platform for a group of young composers to develop a proactive movement with the purpose of improving and literally renovating the quality of the Cuban musical environment. During its existence from 1942 to 1948, the group organized numerous concerts at the Havana Lyceum in order to present their avant-garde compositions to the general public and fostered within its members the development of many future conductors, art critics, performers and professors.

== Work ==
León was leading figures of Cuban musicology during the early decades after the Cuban Revolution (1959). Between 1961 and 1970, León was the director of the Institute of Ethnology and Folklore at the Academy of Sciences of Cuba and he also headed the Folklore Department at the National Theater of Cuba, the Music Department of the José Martí National Library and the Music Department at Casa de Las Américas. He served as professor at the Havana Municipal Conservatory, taught African cultures in Cuba at the Havana University and musicology at the Instituto Superior de Arte (ISA). As a musicologist he published several books which included Del Canto y el Tiempo (1974), where he proposed a subdivision in “generic complexes” to study the musical styles in Cuba.[5]

== See also ==
- Music of Cuba
