= List of Venezuelans =

Republic of Venezuela

Flag

Coat of Arms

Famous or notable Venezuelans include:

== Architecture ==
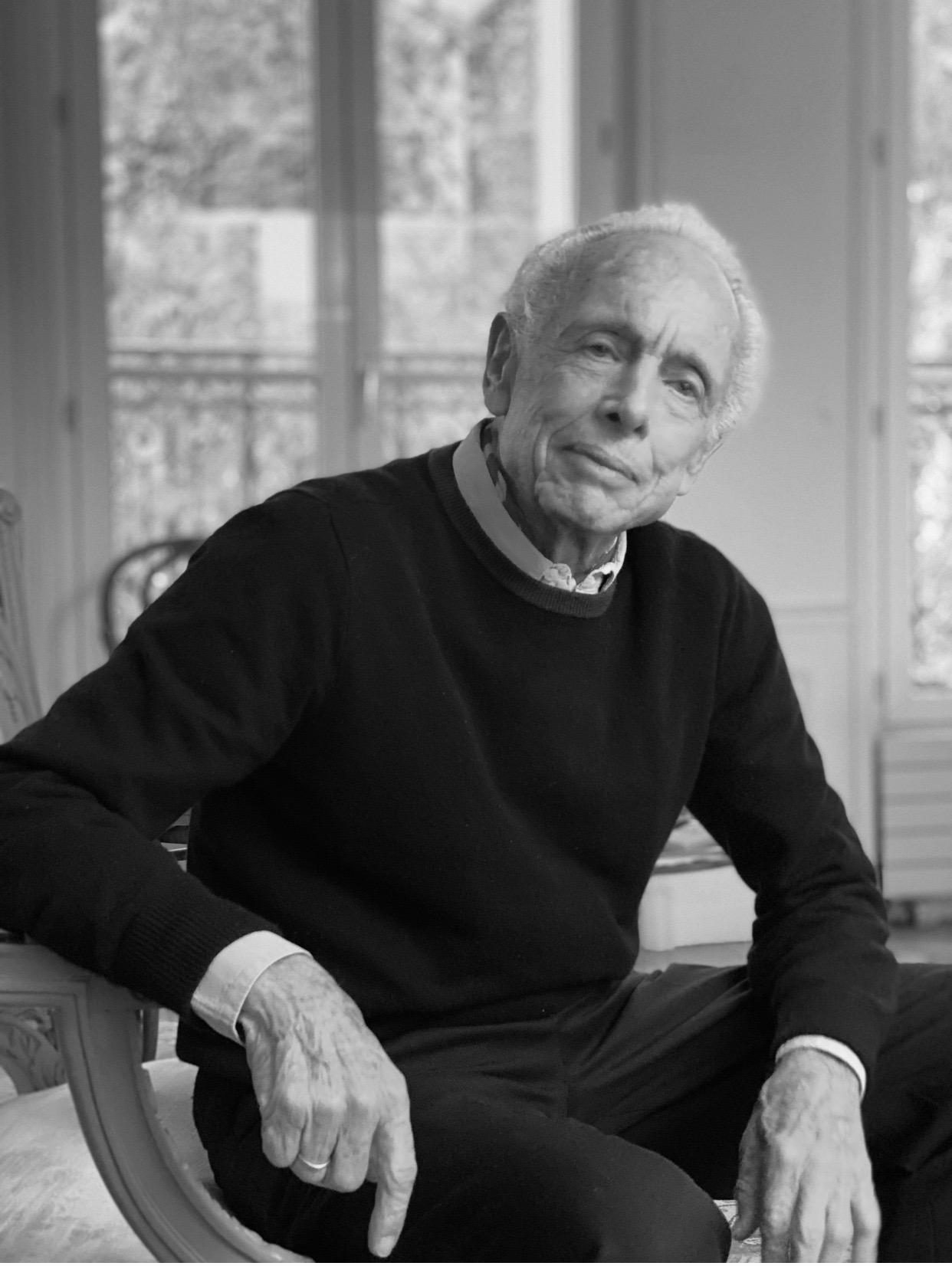
Jimmy Alcock

- Isaac Abadí Abbo
- Jimmy Alcock
- Francisco Andrade Troconis
- Juan Astorga Junquera
- Esther Ayuso
- Celina Bentata
- Anita Berrizbeitia
- Guido Bermudez
- Bernardo Borges
- Dirk Bornhost
- Carlos Brillembourg
- Daniel Camejo Octavio
- Yoe Carrero
- Alejandro Chataing, known as "Cipriano Castro's architect"
- Edmundo Diquez
- Cipriano Dominguez
- Daniel Fernández-Shaw
- José Miguel Galia
- Graziano Gasparini
- Jorge Romero Gutiérrez
- Carlos Gomez de Llarena
- Carlos Guinand Sandoz
- Gustavo Guinand van der Walle
- Andres Haussman
- Tomas Lugo Marcano
- Paul Lustgarten
- Pedro Neuberger
- Mónica Ponce de León
- Jorge Rigamonti (1948–2008)
- Luis Roche
- José Tomás Sanabria
- Henrique Siso Maury
- Luis Muñoz Tébar
- Jesus Tenreiro Degwitz
- Carlos Raúl Villanueva (1900–1975), builder of the Ciudad Universitaria de Caracas
- Luciano Urdaneta
- Martin Vega
- José Vivas
- Gustavo Wallis Legórburu
- Carlos Zapata

== Artists ==
Martín Tovar y Tovar

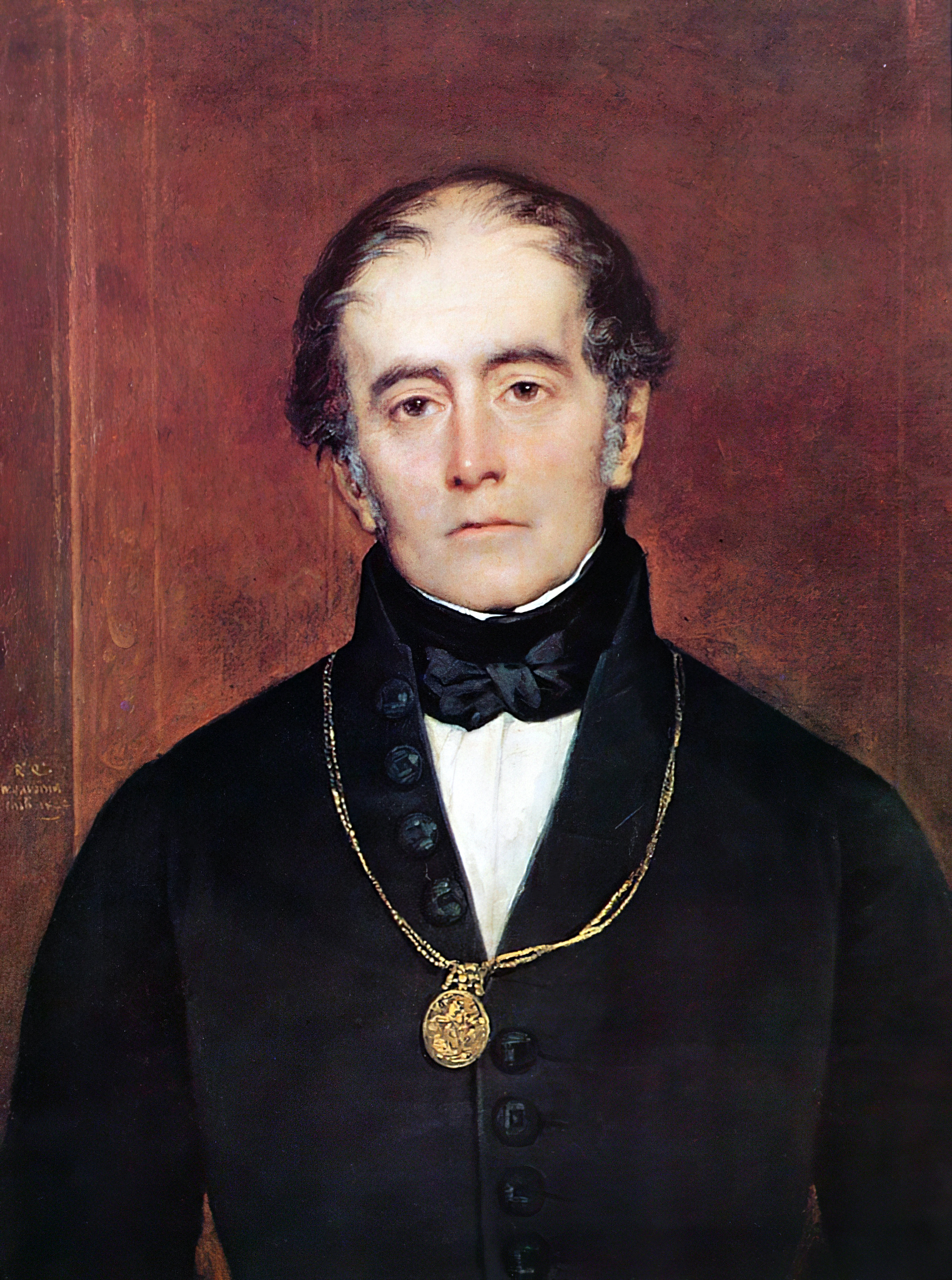
Andrés Bello

- Harry Abend (1937–2021)
- Antonio Ladislao Alcantara (1898–1991)
- Gabriel Bracho (1915–1995)
- Manuel Cabré (1890–1984)
- Gregorio Camacho (1933–2002)
- Pedro Castillo (1790–1858)
- Asdrubal Colmenarez (1945- 2025)
- Elias Crespin (born 1965)
- Carlos Cruz-Díez (1923–2019)
- Mariano Díaz (born 1929)
- Marisol Escobar (1930–2016)
- Elsa Gramcko (1922–1995)
- Mateo Manaure (1926–2018)
- Arturo Michelena (1863–1898)
- Alirio Palacios (1938–2015)
- Darío Pérez-Flores (1936–2022)
- Gego (1912–1994)
- Armando Reverón (1889–1954)
- Tito Salas (1887–1974)
- Jesus Rafael Soto (1923–2005)
- Martín Tovar y Tovar (1827–1902)

== Authors ==
=== A–C ===
- Raquel Abend,poet and writer
- Cecilio Acosta, writer
- Higinia Bartolomé de Alamo, poet and writer
- Laura Antillano, writer
- Jean Aristeguieta, poet
- Alfredo Armas Alfonzo, historian, author
- José Antonio de Armas Chitty, historian and poet
- Rafael Arráiz Lucca, historian and poet
- Enriqueta Arvelo Larriva, poet
- Alberto Arvelo Torrealba, poet
- Jose Balza, writer
- Rafael María Baralt, writer and historian,
- Rufino Blanco Fombona, poet and writer
- Alberto Barrera Tyszka, writer
- Natividad Barroso, writer and ethnologist
- Andrés Bello, educator and humanist
- Alegría Bendayán de Bendelac, writer and poet
- Krina Ber, writer
- Andrés Eloy Blanco, poet
- Eduardo Blanco, novelist and poet
- Mario Briceño Iragorry (1897–1958), writer and historian
- Manuel Caballero, historian and journalist
- Rafael Cadenas, poet
- María Calcaño, poet
- Juan Carlos Chirinos, writer
- Luis Castro Leiva, academic, historian and writer
- Arturo Croce, writer
- Sonia Chocrón, poet

=== D–M ===
- Polita de Lima, poet
- Victoria de Stefano, writer
- Manuel Díaz Rodríguez, novelist and journalist
- Lydda Franco Farías, poet
- Tulio Febres Cordero, writer
- Fabiola Ferrero, journalist and freelance photographer
- María Antonieta Flores, poet
- Rómulo Gallegos, writer
- Julio Garmendia, writer and journalist
- Salvador Garmendia, novelist and story teller
- Vicente Gerbasi, poet
- Jacqueline Goldberg, poet and writer
- Adriano González León, poet and writer
- Ida Gramcko, poet
- Elisa Lerner, writer
- Francisco Herrera Luque (1927–1991), writer
- Rowena Hill, poet
- Eduardo López Bustamante, journalist and poet
- Luz Machado, poet
- Antonieta Madrid, writer
- Francisco Massiani, writer
- Milagros Mata Gil, writer
- Domingo Maza Zavala, journalist and economist
- Juan Carlos Méndez Guédez, writer
- Beatriz Mendoza Sagarzazu, poet
- Guillermo Meneses (1911–1978), writer and journalist
- Eugenio Montejo (1938–2008), poet
- Guillermo Morón, historian and writer
- Stefania Mosca, writer
- Boris Muñoz, journalist and essayst
- Luis Manuel Marcano Salazar writer and historian

=== N–R ===
- Moisés Naím, writer
- Fabricio Ojeda, journalist and writer
- Juan Oropeza, writer
- Hanni Ossott, poet
- Edgar C. Otálvora, journalist and writer
- Miguel Otero Silva, writer
- Antonia Palacios, writer
- Lucila Palacios, writer
- María Fernanda Palacios, writer
- Ramón Palomares, poet
- Yolanda Pantin, poet
- Teresa de la Parra, writer
- Juan Antonio Pérez Bonalde, poet
- Mariano Picón Salas, writer
- José Rafael Pocaterra, writer
- Carlos Rangel, journalist and writer
- Ana María del Re, poet
- Humberto Rivas Mijares, writer
- Aristides Rojas, writer
- Armando Rojas Guardia, writer
- Pablo Rojas Guardia, writer
- Violeta Rojo, poet

=== S–Z ===
- Karina Sainz Borgo (born 1982), journalist and writer
- Tomás Straka, historian
- José Antonio Ramos Sucre, poet
- Oscar Sambrano Urdaneta, writer and literary critic
- Juan Sánchez Peláez, poet
- Elizabeth Schön, writer
- Pedro Sotillo, writer and journalist
- Tui T. Sutherland, writer
- Mireya Tabuas, writer
- Pio Tamayo, writer
- Ana Enriqueta Terán, poet
- Alfredo Toro Hardy, writer and diplomat
- Fermin Toro, writer and statesman
- Ana Teresa Torres, writer
- Arturo Uslar Pietri, historian and writer
- Lucila Velásquez, poet and journalist
- Elena Vera, poet
- Carmen Verde Arocha, poet
- Marisa Vannini, writer
- Miyó Vestrini, journalist, poet and writer
- José Jesús Villa Pelayo, poet and essayist
- Slavko Zupcic, writer

== Beauty queens ==
The following Venezuelans won a beauty title in the Big Four international beauty pageants: Miss Universe, Miss World, Miss International and Miss Earth; the four major international beauty pageants for women.

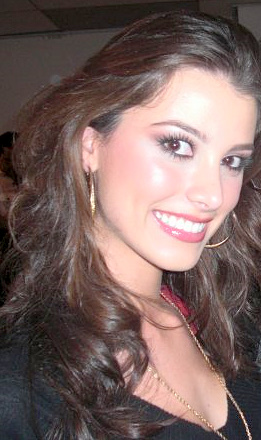
Stefanía Fernández, Miss Universe 2009

=== A–H ===
- Consuelo Adler, Miss International 1997
- Jacqueline Aguilera, Miss World 1995, Top Model of the World 1995
- Goizeder Azúa, Miss International and Miss Mesoamérica 2003
- Alexandra Braun, Miss Earth 2005
- Susana Duijm (1936–2016), Miss World 1955
- Stefanía Fernández, Miss Universe 2009
- Daniela di Giacomo, Miss International 2006
- Alyz Henrich, Miss Earth 2013
- Astrid Carolina Herrera, Miss World 1984

=== I–M ===
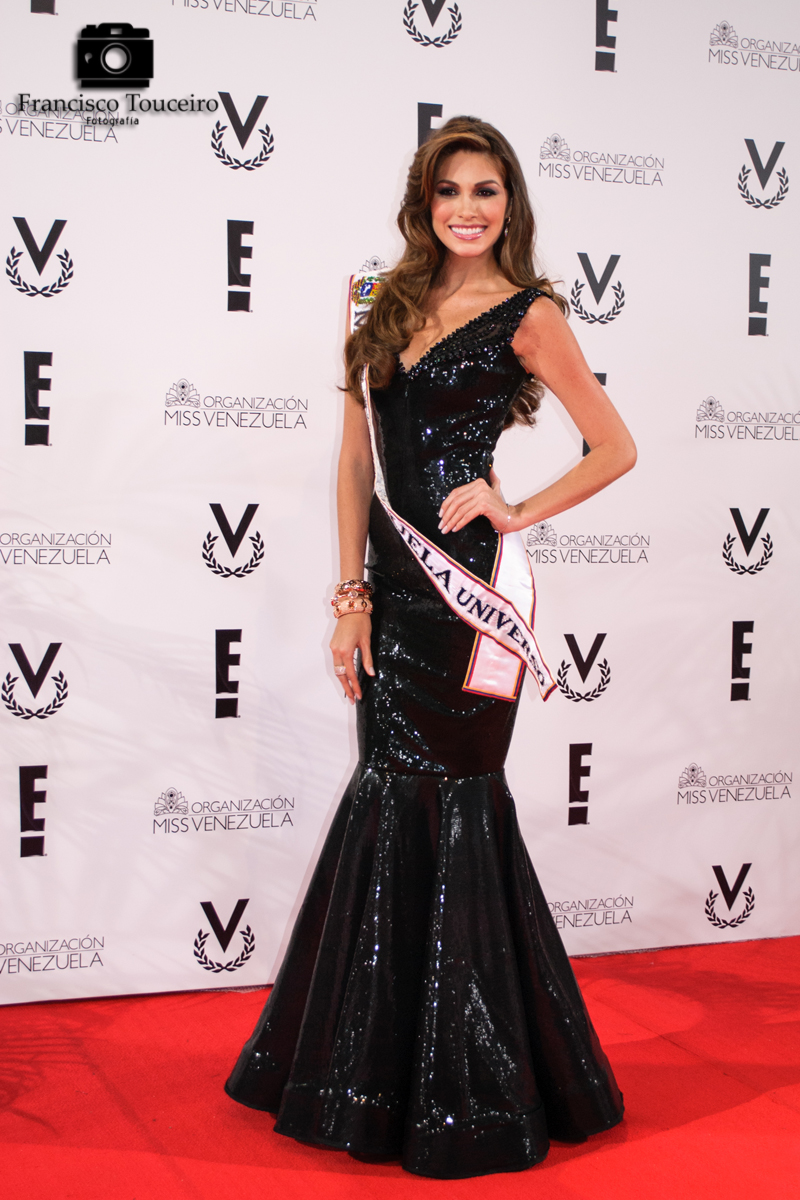
Gabriela Isler, Miss Venezuela 2012 and Miss Universe 2013

- Gabriela Isler, Miss Universe 2013
- Ninibeth Leal, Miss World 1991
- Pilín León, Miss World 1981
- Alicia Machado, Miss Universe 1996
- Dayana Mendoza, Miss Universe 2008
- Edymar Martínez, Miss International 2015

=== O–R ===
- Bárbara Palacios, Miss Universe 1986 and Miss South America 1986

=== S–Y ===
- Irene Sáez, Miss Universe 1981 and Miss South America 1981
- Ivian Sarcos, Miss World 2011
- Maritza Sayalero, Miss Universe 1979
- Nina Sicilia, Miss International 1985
- Mariem Velazco, Miss International 2018

== Business and law ==
- Roy Altman (born 1982), judge of the U.S. District Court for the Southern District of Florida, lawyer, and author
- Henry Lord Boulton, aviator, entrepreneur, owner, and former owner of many businesses such as Casas Boulton, Avensa/Servivensa
- Gustavo Cisneros, Venezuelan-born media mogul. He was among the world's richest men according to Forbes magazine, which estimated his fortune at one point was at $6 billion.
- Juan Carlos Escotet, banker
- Manuel Antonio Matos, banker and caudillo
- Lorenzo Mendoza Fleury, co-founder of oversees one of Venezuela's largest private companies, $6 billion (sales) Empresas Polar.
- Eugenio Mendoza (1906–1979), business tycoon who made important contributions in the modernization of the country during the 20th century.
- Carolina Herrera, fashion designer and entrepreneur who founded her eponymous company in 1980.
- Lorenzo Mendoza (born 1965), actual owner of Empresas Polar
- William H. Phelps, Jr., ornithologist and founder of Radio Caracas Televisión
- William H. Phelps, ornithologist and founder of Radio Caracas Radio
- Heriberto Lobo, entreprenour, sugar trader
- Julio Lobo Olavarria, entreprenour, sugar trader
- Jorge Alfredo Silva Cardona, entrepreneur
- Carlos Eduardo Stolk (1912–1995), founding member of the United Nations, Chairman of the Board and President of Empresas Polar
- Tomas Terry, entrepreneur, sugar trader
- Miguel Urdaneta Fernández, founder of SBA Airlines
- José Grasso Vecchio, banker
- Luis Emilio Velutini (born 1953), businessman and investor of the Latin American financial and real estate market
- Juan Antonio Yanes, executive in Venezuelan Professional Baseball League who owned the Patriotas de Venezuela franchise

== Cartoonists ==
- Jorge Blanco
- Pedro León Zapata

== Diplomats ==
- Milos Alcalay
- Diego Arria
- Miguel Ángel Burelli Rivas
- Regulo Burelli Rivas
- Aristides Calvani
- Roy Chaderton
- Pedro Gual Escandón
- Alejo Fortique
- Juan García Gruber, ambassador in Nicaragua
- Fernando Gerbasi
- Luis Lopez Mendez
- Numa Quevedo
- Jose Rafael Revenga, ambassador
- Samuel Moncada, ambassador
- Efraín Schacht Aristeguieta, ambassador
- Carlos Alberto Taylhardat, ambassador to Iraq and Lebanon
- Alfredo Toro Hardy, ambassador
- Fermin Toro, ambassador
- Carlos Vecchio, ambassador

== Engineering ==
- Cristina Amon, Dean, Faculty of Applied Science and Engineering, University of Toronto
- Francisco de Paula Andrade Troconis
- Jacqueline Faría
- Celso Fortoul
- Arnoldo Jose Gabaldon Berti
- Salomón Cohen Levy
- Carlos Genatios
- José González-Lander, engineer, head engineer for the Metro de Caracas (1993–2000)
- Alfredo Jahn, engineer and naturalist
- Henrique Machado Zuloaga
- Óscar Augusto Machado Zuloaga
- María Corina Machado
- Juan Francisco Otaola Pavan
- L. Rafael Reif, engineer, President of MIT
- Gustavo Rivas-Mijares
- Keysi Sayago
- Leopoldo Sucre Figarella

== Entertainment ==
=== A–D ===
- Mayra Alejandra, television and film actress
- Fedora Alemán, lyric soprano and actress
- María Conchita Alonso, Cuban-born Venezuelan raised actress and singer
- Daniela Alvarado, actress
- Marcy Avila, musician, actress, and producer
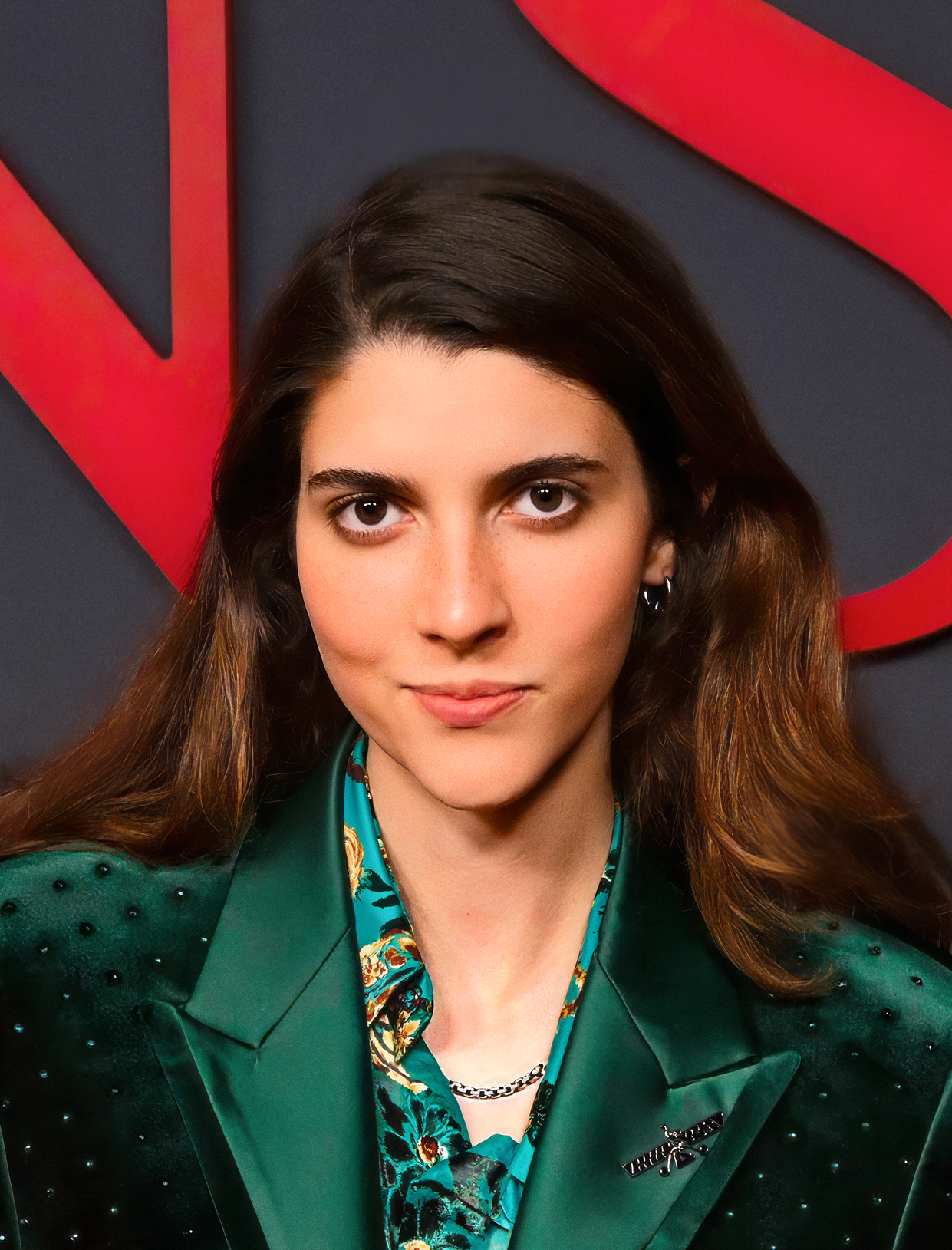
  Marcy Avila
- Ivonne Attas, actress and politician
- Henry Ayala, clown
- Juan A. Baptista, actor
- José Bardina, Spanish-born Venezuelan actor
- Marina Baura, Spanish-born Venezuelan actress
- Amador Bendayán, actor and entertainer
- Marisela Berti, actress, beauty queen and show host
- Alexandra Braun, model
- Jacques Braunstein, Romanian-born Venezuelan radio host
- Maritza Bustamante, actress and model
- Santiago Cabrera, actor
- Fernando Carrillo, actor
- Grecia Colmenares, Venezuelan-born Argentine actress
- Francisco José Cróquer, sportscaster and poetic declaimer
- Carlos Cruz, actor
- Eliana Cuevas, singer-songwriter
- Guillermo Dávila, actor and singer
- Miguel de León, actor
- Oscar D'León, singer and bandleader
- Majandra Delfino, actress
- Chiquinquirá Delgado, actress and model
- Christina Dieckmann, actress and model
- Kimberly Dos Ramos actress

=== E–P ===
- Eva Ekvall, television hostess
- Gaby Espino, actress
- Maria Gabriela de Faría, actress
- Lele Pons, internet personality and actress
- Lupita Ferrer, actress
- Sandro Finoglio, actor, model
- Catherine Fulop, actress, television host
- Sheyene Gerardi, actress and model
- Viviana Gibelli, Polish-born Venezuelan television host
- Guillermo Fantástico González, Spanish-born Venezuelan television host
- Scarlet Gruber, actress
- Joselo, actor and comedian
- Cynthia Lander, beauty pageant contestant
- Jean Paul Leroux, actor
- Diony López, clown
- Carlos Mata, actor, singer, TV presenter
- Esperanza Magaz, Cuban-born Venezuelan actress
- Laureano Márquez, humorist and political scientist
- Rosmeri Marval, actress, model and singer
- Lila Morillo, actress, singer
- Carlos Montilla, actor, musician
- Daniela Navarro, actress, model
- Aquiles Nazoa, writer, journalist, poet and humorist
- Carlos Olivier, actor
- Renny Ottolina, television host and producer
- Enrique Palacios, model
- Vanessa Pose, actress
- Marianne Puglia, model

=== R–S ===
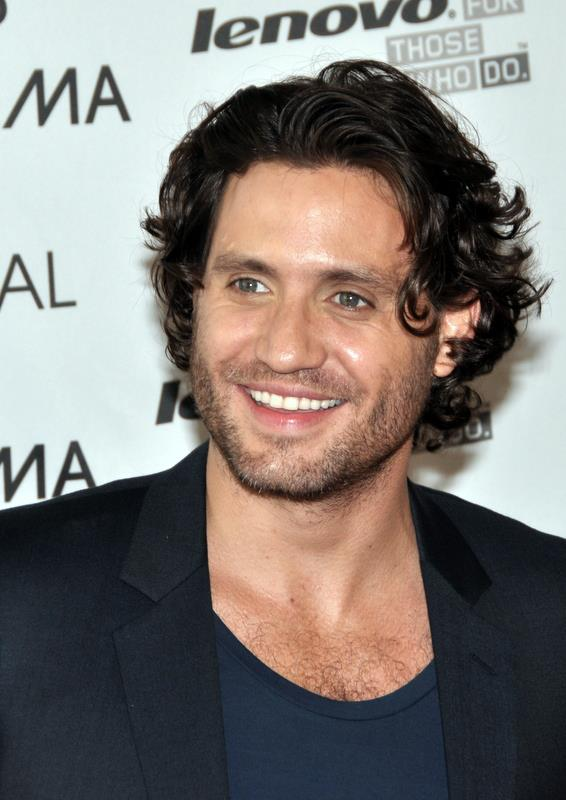
Édgar Ramírez

- Édgar Ramírez, film actor and television producer
- Veruska Ramírez, model
- Benjamín Rausseo (a.k.a. Er Conde del Guácharo), comedian
- Maricarmen Regueiro, actress
- Gustavo Rodríguez, film, stage and television actor
- José Luis Rodríguez (a.k.a. El Puma), singer and actor
- Mariangel Ruiz, actress and model
- Emma Rabbe, Canadian born Velenzuelan telenovela actress
- Juan Carlos Salazar, singer, musician, composer
- Sabrina Salvador, television host
- Luis José Santander, actor
- Enrique Sapene, actor and television producer
- Daniel Sarcos, television host
- Marger Sealey, singer
- Sabrina Seara, actress
- Eduardo Serrano, actor
- Sonya Smith, American-born Venezuelan actress
- Verónica Schneider, actress and model
- Gabriela Spanic, actress
- Mónica Spear, actress, model
- Natalia Streignard, Spanish-born Venezuelan actress
- Francys Sudnicka, model
- Juana Sujo, Argentinian-born actress and theatrical educator

=== T–Z ===
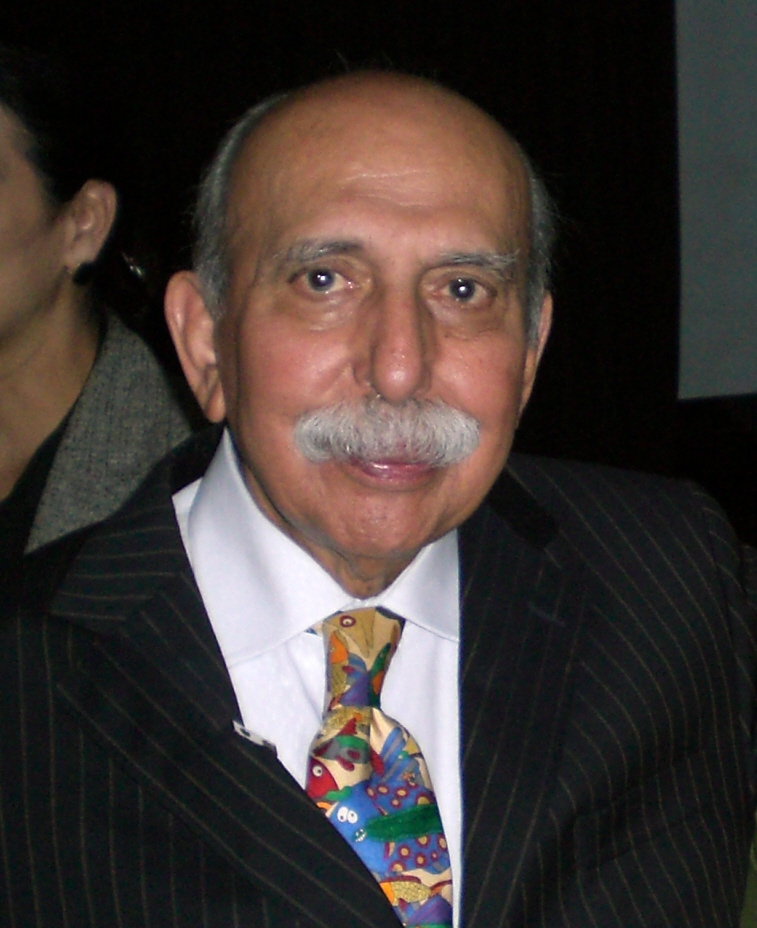
Oscar Yanes

- Carolina Tejera, actress, model
- Coraima Torres, actress
- Orlando Urdaneta, actor
- Wilmer Valderrama, actor, television host
- Angélica Vale, actress
- Dominika van Santen, model
- Patricia Velásquez, actress, model
- Rita Verreos, beauty pageant contestant
- Doris Wells, actress
- Oscar Yanes, journalist, writer

== Filmmakers ==
- Elizabeth Avellán (born 1960)
- Román Chalbaud (born 1931)
- Clemente de la Cerda (1935–1984)
- Solveig Hoogesteijn (born 1946)
- Jonathan Jakubowicz (born 1978)
- Marcel Rasquin (born 1976)
- Luis Armando Roche (born 1938)
- Mariana Rondon, (born 1966)
- Fina Torres (born 1951)
- Lorenzo Vigas (born 1967)
- Diego Vicentini (born 1994)

== Historical ==
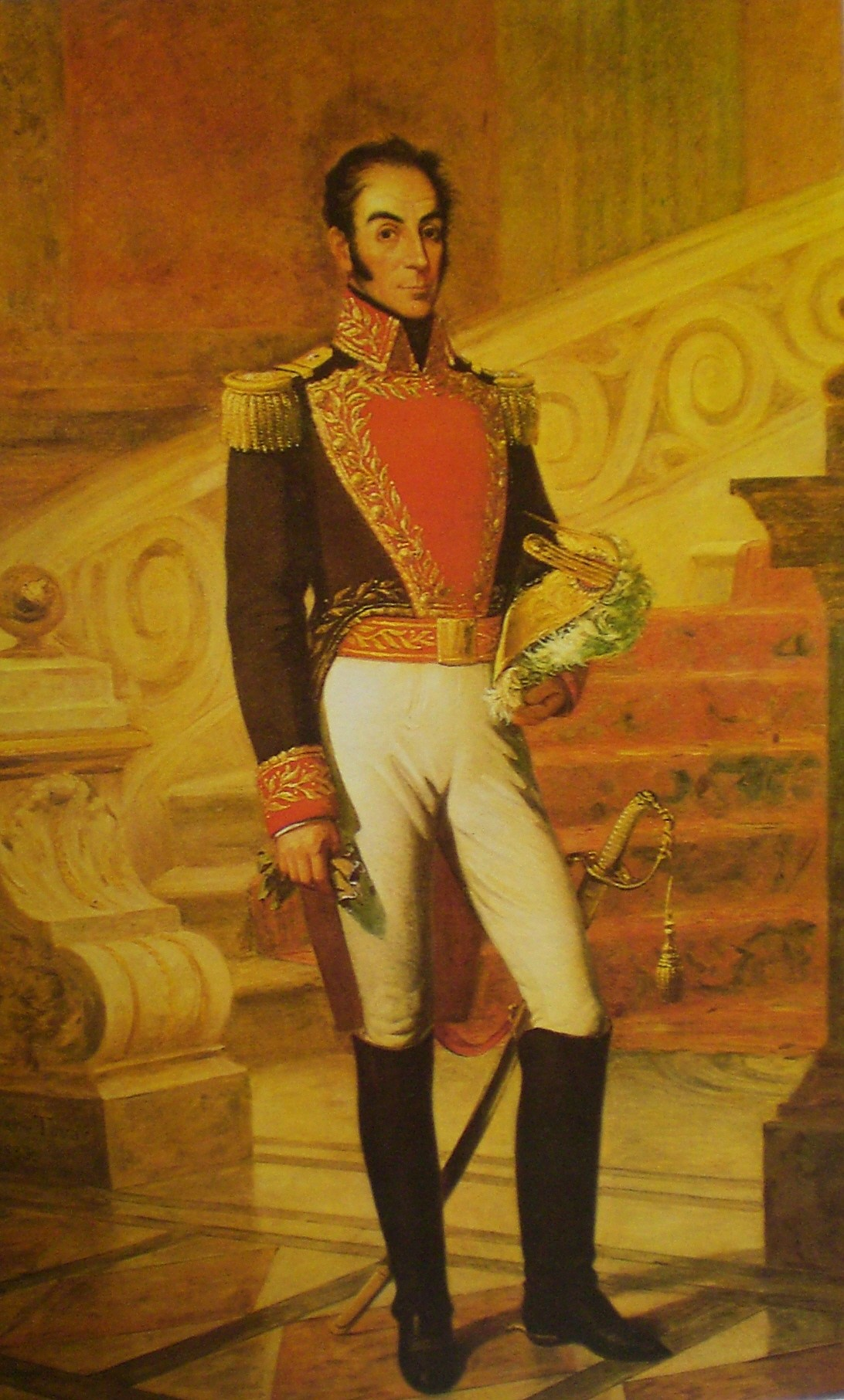
Simón Bolívar

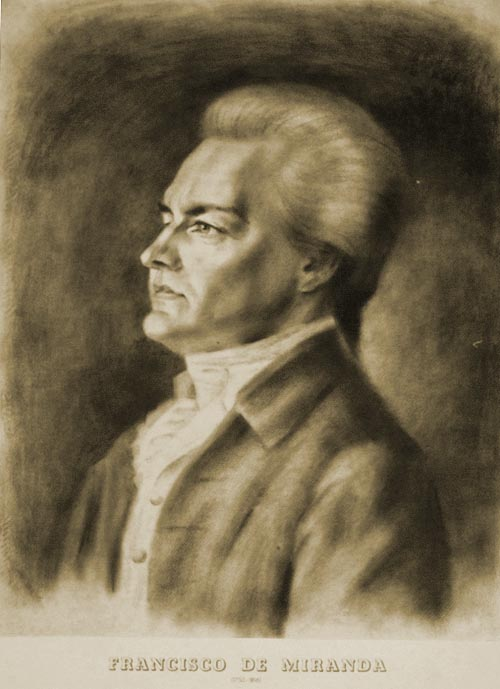
Francisco de Miranda

- Simón Bolívar (1783–1830), Wars of Independence leader, military commander, Father of the Nation
- José Tomás Boves (1782–1814), Wars of Independence leader, military caudillo
- Luisa Cáceres de Arismendi (1799–1866), heroine from the Venezuelan War of Independence
- Pedro Camejo (better known as Negro Primero, or The First Black) (1790–1821), lieutenant at the Venezuelan war of independence
- Agostino Codazzi (1793–1859), Italian born, military officer, cartographer, former governor of Barinas
- Francisco de Miranda (1750–1816), Wars of Independence leader, veteran of the U.S. and French revolutions
- Antonio José de Sucre (1795–1830), Wars of Independence leader, Grand Marshal of Ayacucho, president of Bolivia (1826–1828), president of Peru
- Juan José Flores (1800–1864), founder of the Repubilic of Ecuador and its first President
- Pedro Gual Escandón (1783–1862), President of Venezuela in 1858, 1859, and 1861
- Santiago Mariño (1788–1854), hero in the Venezuelan War of Independence, and important leader of Venezuela's eastern
- Cristóbal Mendoza (1772–1829), considered to be the first President of Venezuela
- José Gregorio Monagas (1795–1858), hero of the Venezuelan War of Independence, and former president
- José Tadeo Monagas (1784–1868), hero of the Venezuelan War of Independence, and former president
- Mariano Montilla (1782–1851), Major General of the Army of Venezuela in the Venezuelan War of Independence
- José Antonio Páez (1790–1873), Wars of Independence leader, former president
- José Félix Ribas (1775–1815), leader and hero of the Venezuelan War of Independence
- Juan Germán Roscio (1763–1821), lawyer and politician, main editor of the Venezuelan Declaration of Independence and chief architect of the Venezuelan Constitution of 1811
- Josefa Joaquina Sánchez (1765–1813), embroiderer of the first Venezuelan flag
- Leonor de La Guerra y Vega Ramírez (died 1816), Venezuelan protester
- Rafael Urdaneta (1788–1845), hero of the Latin American wars of independence
- Fernando Adames Torres (1837–1910), General of the Army during the Revolution of Coro, Senator representing Lara State and Chief of Staff
- Fermin Toro (1807–1865), politician, diplomat, writer, minister of Finance and Foreign Affairs, president of the 1858 National Convention
- Buenaventura Macabeo Maldonado (1854–1901), military man and politician, a key figure in the political and military conflicts of the Venezuelan and Latin American Andes and Member of the Venezuelan Chamber of Deputies for the state of Táchira in 1878 and 1893
- Samuel Darío Maldonado (1870–1925), Venezuelan surgeon, anthropologist, writer, journalist and politician, Minister of Public Instruction of Venezuela in 1908

== Mass media ==
- Carla Angola. journalist
- Mariana Atencio, journalist, anchor, correspondent
- Arístides Bastidas, science journalism
- Nelson Bocaranda, political journalist and broadcaster
- Carlos Capriles Ayala, journalist and historian
- Miguel Ángel Capriles Ayala, journalist and editor
- María Teresa Castillo, journalist and cultural entrepreneur
- José Agustín Catalá, journalist and author
- Luis Chataing, radio host and humorist
- Simón Alberto Consalvi, journalist, author and politician
- Milena Gimón, sports journalist
- Roberto Giusti, political journalist and broadcaster
- Laureano Márquez, Spanish-born Venezuelan journalist and humorist
- Aníbal Nazoa, journalist and writer
- Aquiles Nazoa, journalist, writer and humorist
- Jorge Olavarría, political journalist and historian
- Rafael Poleo, political journalist and editor
- Abelardo Raidi, sports journalist and broadcaster
- Lil Rodríguez, cultural journalist
- Oscar Yanes, journalist and writer

== Mountaineers ==
- José Antonio Delgado, first person to summit five eight-thousanders.

== Musicians ==
=== A–B ===
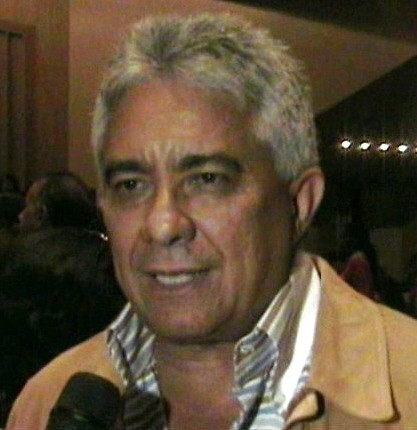
Reynaldo Armas

- Adrenalina Caribe, Caribbean music group
- Abraham Abreu, harpsichordist and pianist
- Aldo Abreu, Medieval-Baroque recorder executant
- José Antonio Abreu, classical musician and founder of El Sistema
- Vinicio Adames, choral group conductor
- Francisco de Paula Aguirre, composer
- Ricardo Aguirre, singer-songwriter
- Gustavo Aguado, bandleader, double bassist, co-founder of Guaco
- Fedora Alemán, lyric soprano and actress
- Luis Alfonzo Larrain, bandleader, arranger, composer
- Los Amigos Invisibles, funk music band
- Arca (musician), musician and record producer
- Diana Arismendi, composer
- Fulgencio Aquino, Venezuelan harp player, composer
- Reynaldo Armas, singer-songwriter
- The Asbestos, rock music band
- Devendra Banhart, American-Venezuelan singer-songwriter
- Huáscar Barradas, flautist, composer
- Édgar Bastidas, lyric tenor
- Carlos Baute, pop singer
- Beatriz Bilbao, composer
- Hugo Blanco, Venezuelan harp player, songwriter
- Modesta Bor, composer, choir conductor
- Soledad Bravo, singer
- Benjamín Brea, Spanish-born Venezuelan musician
- Vytas Brenner, keyboardist, songwriter
- Andréa Burns, American-born Venezuelan singer

=== C–D ===
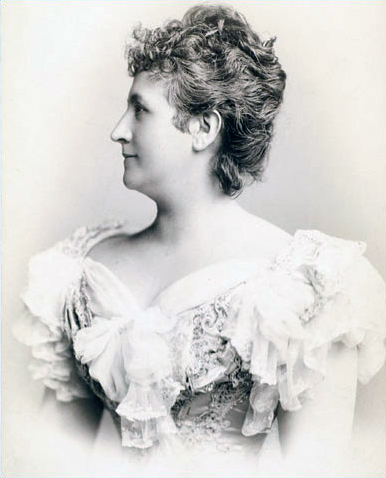
Teresa Carreño

- Héctor Cabrera, singer
- Benito Canónico, composer
- Los Cañoneros, Caraquenian traditional genres group
- Calle Ciega, reggaeton band
- Andres Carciente, concert pianist
- Alexis Cardenas, violinist
- Renato Capriles, bandleader and composer
- Caramelos de Cianuro, rock band
- Ramon Carranza, saxophonist, instructor
- El Carrao de Palmarito (Juan de los Santos Contreras), folk singer
- Inocente Carreño, classical composer, conductor
- Teresa Carreño, 19th century pianist
- Evencio Castellanos, classical pianist
- Mirla Castellanos, pop singer
- Jose Francisco del Castillo, violinist
- José Catire Carpio, folk singer
- María Teresa Chacín, folk singer
- Los Chamos, pop group
- Ilan Chester, pop singer-songwriter
- Chino & Nacho, reggaeton duet
- Rubén Cedeño, lyric singer
- Collegium Musicum de Caracas, classical music group
- Sylvia Constantinidis, Venezuelan-born American classical pianist, composer, conductor, also a multimedia artist, writer, music educator
- Los Cuñaos, traditional eight-part vocal group
- Guillermo Dávila, pop singer
- Desorden Público, ska band
- Franco De Vita, pop singer-songwriter
- Alirio Díaz, classical guitarist
- Simón Díaz, folk singer-songwriter
- Dimensión Latina, salsa band
- Oscar D'León, salsa singer
- Rubén Domínguez, lyric tenor
- Gustavo Dudamel, classical conductor

=== E–J ===
- Eliana Cuevas, singer-songwriter
- Ensamble Gurrufío, folk instrumental group
- Antonio Estévez, classical composer
- Flor Roffé de Estévez, was a composer, writer, and professor of Venezuelan music
- Pedro Eustache, classical flute player
- Heraclio Fernández, pianist, composer
- Ignacio Figueredo, Venezuelan harp player
- Billo Frómeta, Dominican-born Venezuelan bandleader, songwriter, arranger
- Otilio Galíndez, folk and pop composer
- Hernán Gamboa, Venezuelan cuatro player
- Gran Coquivacoa, Venezuelan gaita group
- Guaco, pop and salsa band
- Pedro Elías Gutiérrez, composer, conductor
- Reynaldo Hahn, Venezuelan-born French classical composer
- Lorenzo Herrera, folk and pop singer-songwriter
- Enrique Hidalgo, folk and pop songwriter
- Cheo Hurtado, Venezuelan cuatro player
- Gualberto Ibarreto, folk and pop singer
- Jorge Isaac, Medieval-Baroque recorder executant
- Adina Izarra, composer
- Jeremías, British-born Venezuelan pop singer-songwriter
- Guillermo Jiménez Leal, Venezuelan cuatro player, singer-songwriter
- Porfirio Jiménez, Dominican-born Venezuelan bandleader, arranger, songwriter

=== K–N ===
- Luis Laguna, musician, songwriter
- José Ángel Lamas, classical composer
- Lasso, pop-rock singer
- Antonio Lauro, composer, guitarist
- Anselmo López, Venezuelan bandola performer
- Ángel Custodio Loyola, folk singer
- Natalia Luis-Bassa, classical conductor
- Aquiles Machado, operatic tenor
- Pablo Manavello, Italian-born Venezuelan rock guitarist
- Mango, salsa music group
- Rosario Marciano, Venezuelan pianist
- Maracaibo 15, gaita ensamble
- Floria Márquez, bolero singer
- Rudy Marquez, pop singer
- Henry Martínez, songwriter
- Mayré Martínez, pop singer-songwriter
- Eduardo Marturet, classical conductor
- Carlos Mata, singer-songwriter, actor
- Francisco Mata, folk singer-songwriter
- Laudelino Mejías, composer
- Los Melódicos, dance band
- Conny Méndez, composer, singer, writer
- Armando Molero, singer-songwriter
- Moisés Moleiro, classical composer
- Silvano Monasterios, jazz pianist, composer
- Ricardo Montaner, singer-songwriter
- Gabriela Montero, pianist
- José Ángel Montero, opera composer
- Morella Muñoz, lyric mezzo-soprano
- Alberto Naranjo, arranger, conductor
- Graciela Naranjo, bolero singer, film actress

=== O–R ===
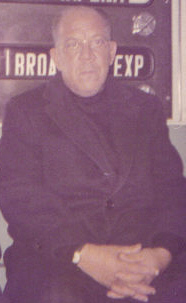
Victor Guillermo Ramos Rangel

- Orquesta Sinfónica Gran Mariscal de Ayacucho, symphony orchestra
- Orquesta Sinfónica Simón Bolívar, symphony orchestra
- Orquesta Sinfónica Venezuela, symphony orchestra
- Francisco Pacheco, folk singer
- Eneas Perdomo, joropo singer-songwriter
- Iván Pérez Rossi, Venezuelan cuatro player, singer, composer
- Allan Phillips, pop songwriter, producer
- Juan Bautista Plaza, classical composer
- Claudia Prieto, singer-songwriter
- Alí Primera, singer-songwriter
- Pancho Prin, folk singer-songwriter
- Edward Pulgar, classical violinist, conductor
- Ana María Raga, choral group conductor, composer, pianist
- Luis Felipe Ramón y Rivera, composer, performer, investigator, writer
- Victor Ramos Rangel, classical composer, bassoon player
- Rudy Regalado, Latin-jazz and pop bandleader, percussionist
- Fredy Reyna, Venezuelan cuatro player
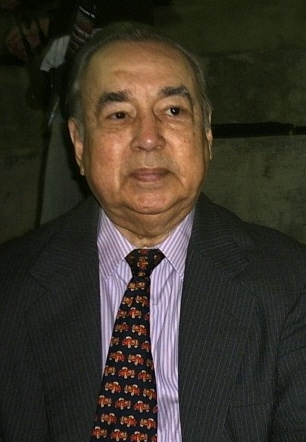
  Aldemaro Romero
- Rodrigo Riera, classical guitarist
- Rafael Rincón González, singer-songwriter
- Pedro Antonio Ríos Reyna, classical violinist
- María Rivas, jazz-pop singer-songwriter
- Luis Mariano Rivera, Venezuelan cuatro player, songwriter
- Aldemaro Romero, classical and pop composer, conductor, bandleader
- Omar Rudberg, singer and actor
- Alfredo Rugeles, composer, conductor
- Otmaro Ruíz, jazz and pop pianist, arranger, composer

=== S–Z ===
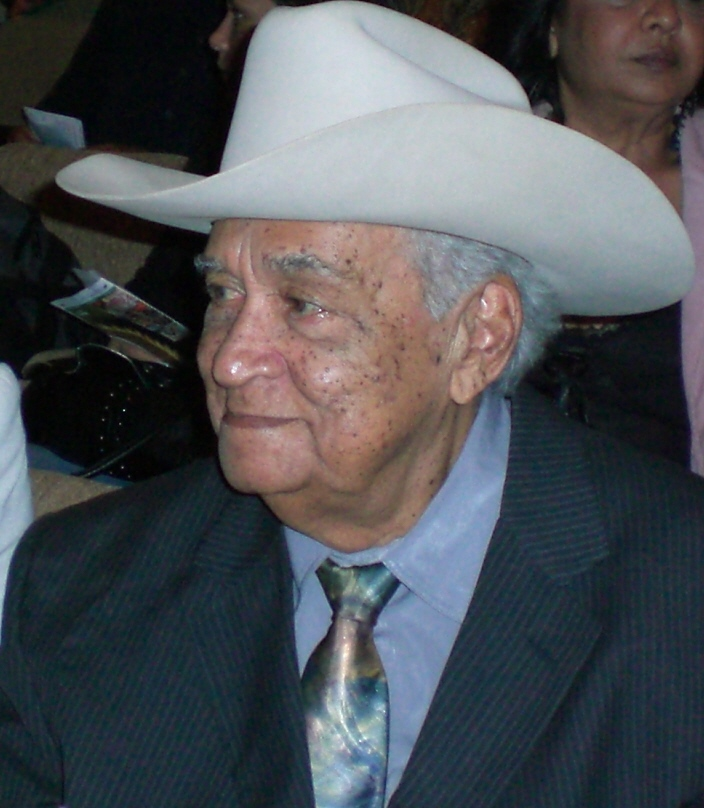
Juan Vicente Torrealba

- Alfredo Sadel, lyric tenor, pop singer, songwriter
- Rodolfo Saglimbeni, classical conductor
- Juan Carlos Salazar, Venezuelan cuatro player, singer-songwriter
- Magdalena Sánchez, joropo singer
- Chucho Sanoja, bandleader, arranger, pianist, songwriter
- José Enrique Sarabia, songwriter
- Ángel Sauce, classical composer, violinist, conductor
- Serenata Guayanesa, folk vocal and instrumental quartet
- Eduardo Serrano, songwriter, arranger, conductor, performer
- Simoney, singer, TV host
- Vicente Emilio So,jo, classical composer, conductor, musicologist, educator
- Henry Stephen, pop singer
- Mario Suárez, pop-folk singer
- Los Terrícolas, pop-rock vocal and instrumental group
- Ricardo Teruel, composer
- Ender Thomas, pop singer-songwriter
- Todosantos, indie Latin-rock band
- Juan Vicente Torrealba, Venezuelan harp player, composer
- El Trabuco Venezolano, Latin-jazz salsa big band
- Lilia Vera, folk singer
- Verona, rock vocal and instrumental group
- Voz Veis, pop vocal sextet
- Franco de Vita, pop singer and composer
- Anaís Vivas (born 1989), pop singer
- Gerry Weil, Austrian-born Venezuelan jazz pianist
- Yordano, singer, composer
- ZAPATO 3, rock music vocal and instrumental group

== Politicians ==
- Pablo Acosta Ortiz (1864–1914), Doctor, Surgeon, Politician.
- Rómulo Betancourt (1908–1981), former president (1945–1948; 1959–1964) and founder of the Democratic Action party (AD, by its initials in Spanish)
- Juan Guaidó (born 1983), politician & political activist.
- Douglas Bravo (born 1923), former guerrilla leader and founder of the Venezuelan Revolution party (PRV, for its initials in Spanish)
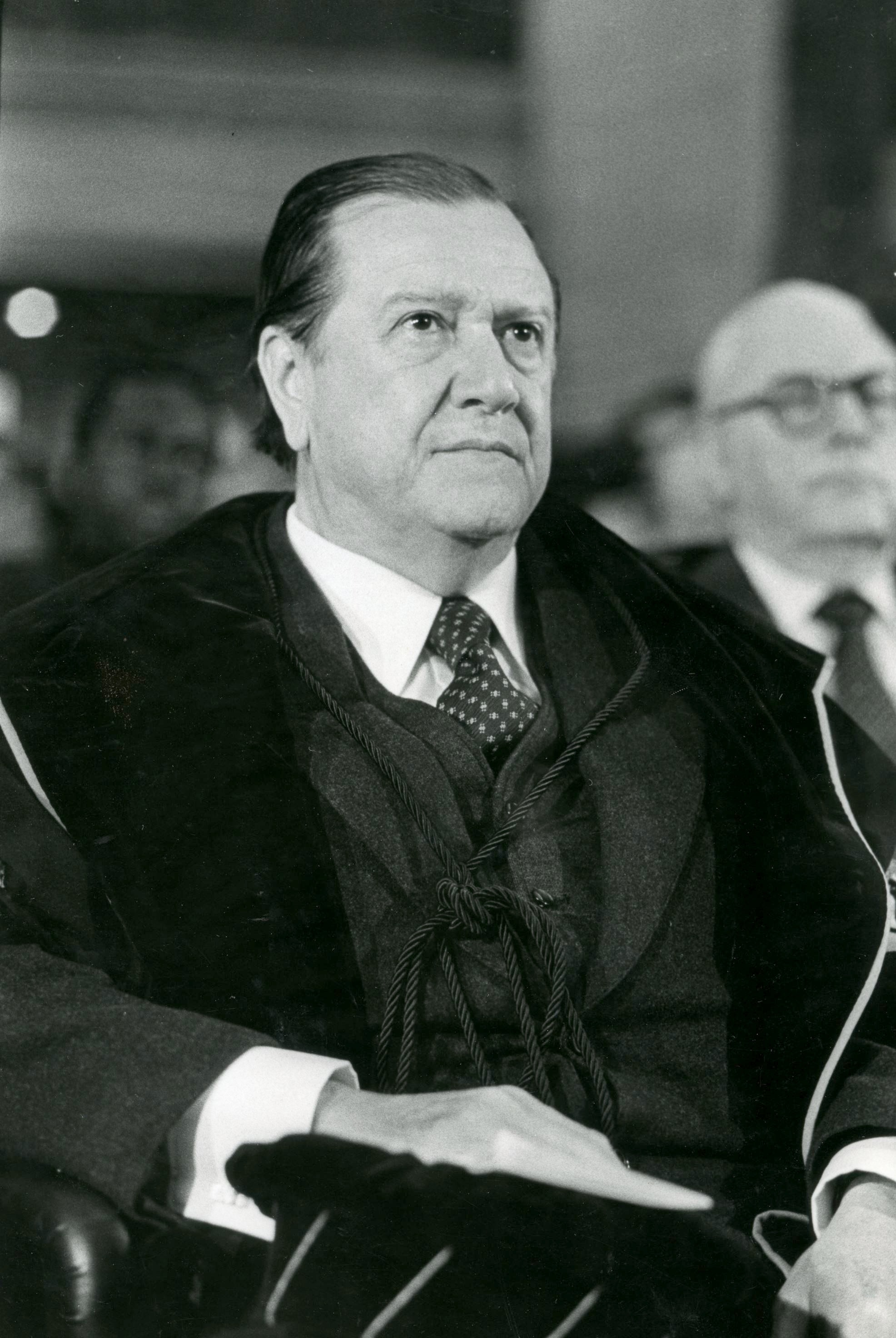
  Rafael Caldera
- Rafael Caldera (1916–2009), former president (1969–1974; 1994–1999) and founder of the Social Christian party (Copei, by its initials in Spanish)
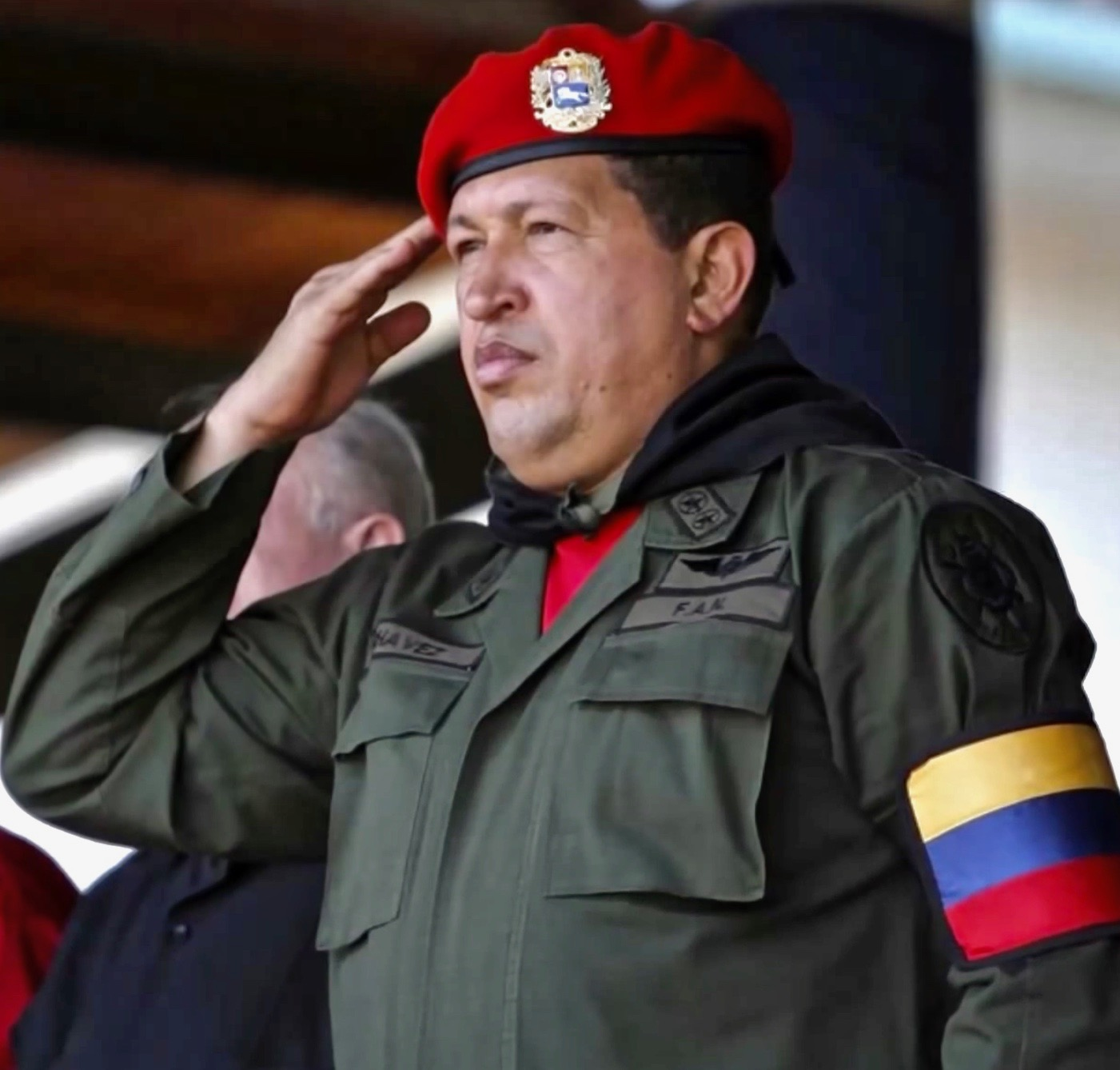
  Hugo Chávez
- Rubén González Cárdenas (1875 –1939), lawyer He became Secretary General for the Government; Minister of Public Instruction and Minister of Interior Relations
- Pedro Carmona (born 1941), former president (2002)
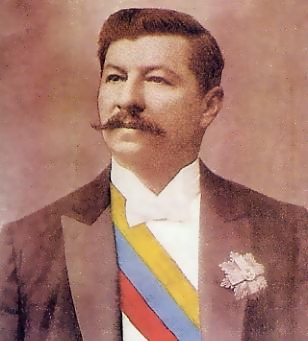
  Juan Vicente Gómez
- Cipriano Castro (1858–1924), former president (1899–1908)
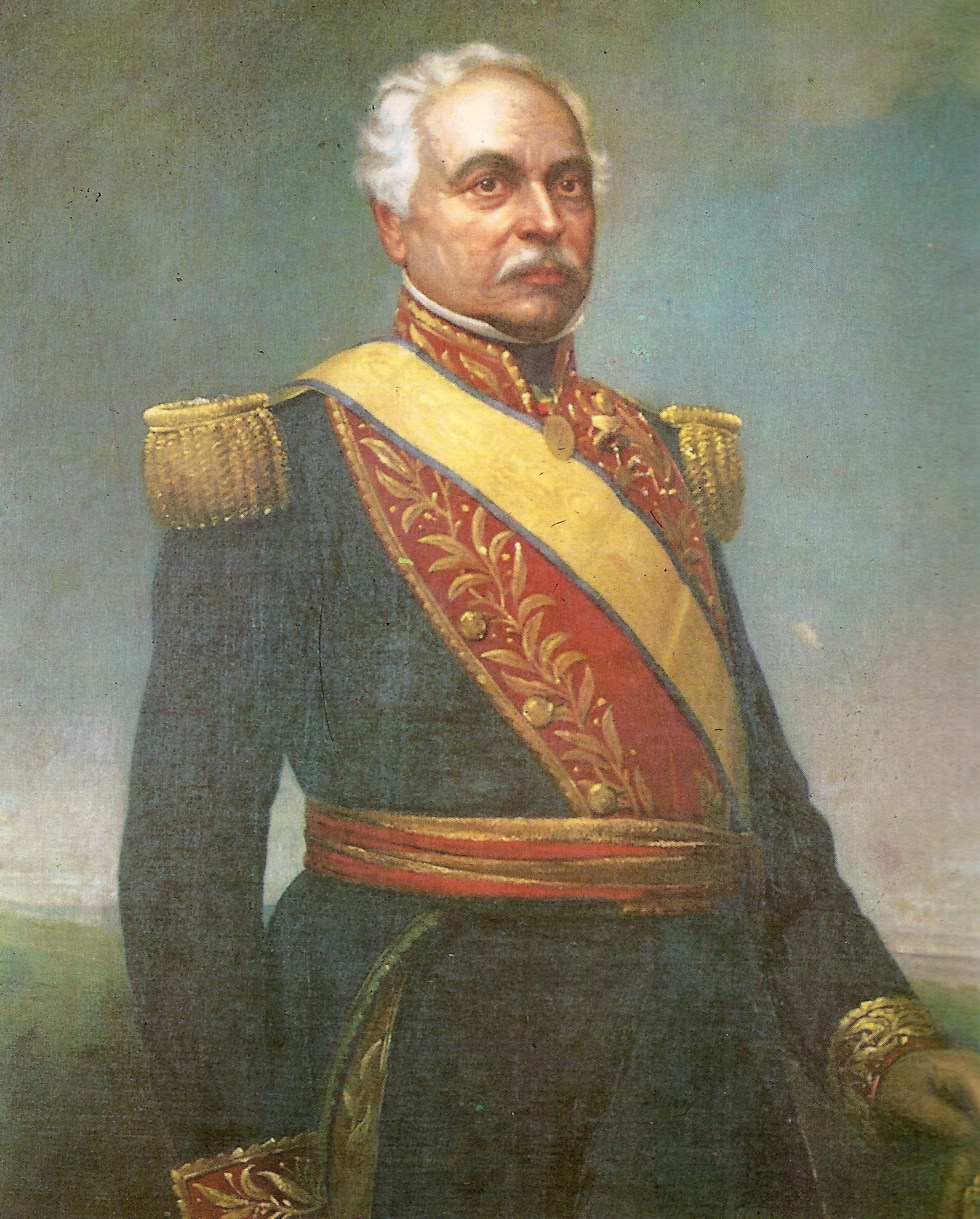
  José Antonio Páez
- Hugo Chávez (1954–2013), former president (1999–2013) and founder of the Fifth Republic Movement party (MVR, by its initials in Spanish)
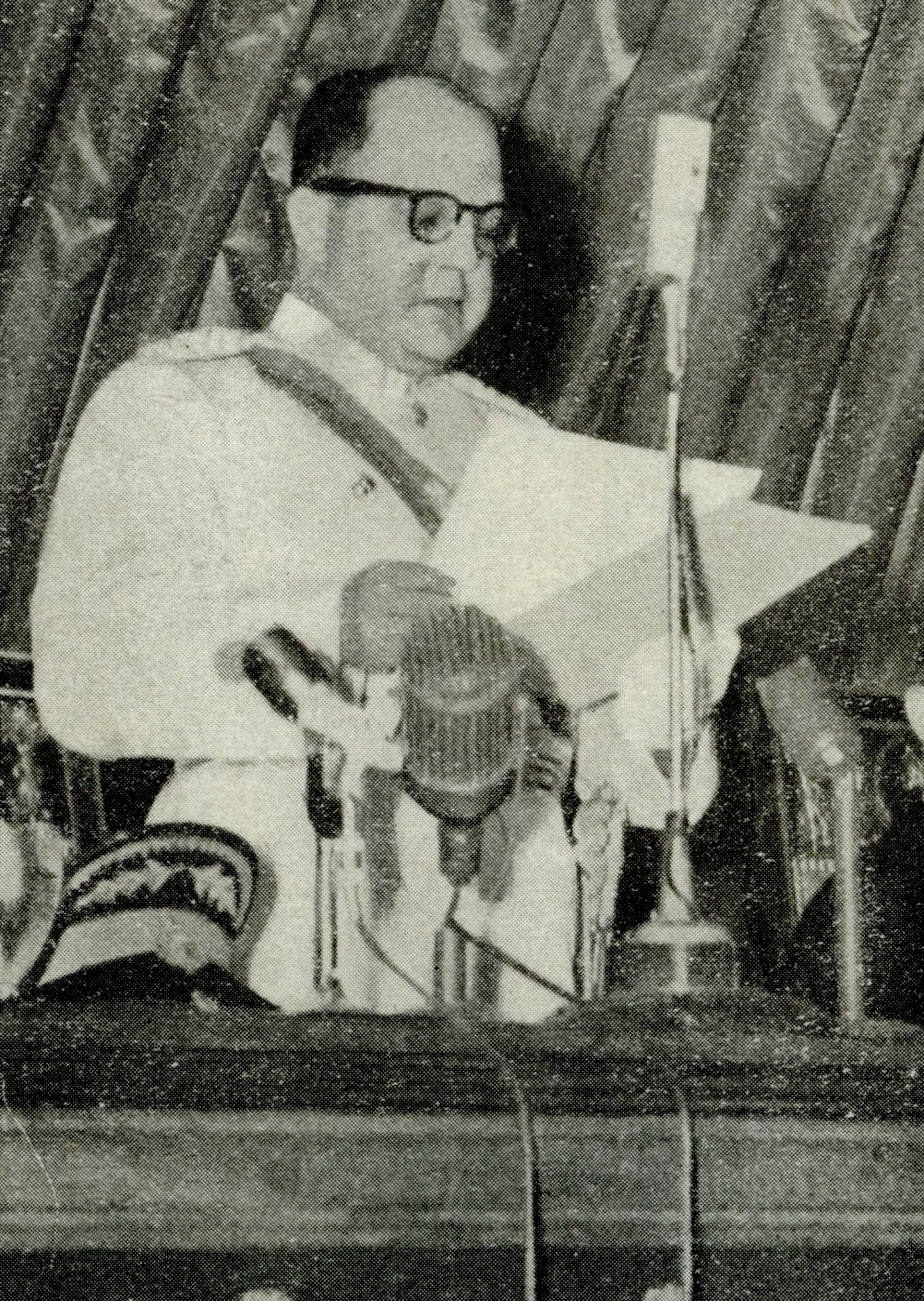
  Marcos Pérez Jiménez
- Joaquín Crespo (1841–1898), former president (1884–1886; 1892–1898)
- Juan Crisóstomo Falcón (1820–1870), former president (1863–1868)
- Rómulo Gallegos (1884–1969), former president (1948)
- Juan Vicente Gómez (1857–1935), former president (1908–1935)
- Antonio Guzmán Blanco (1829–1899), former president (1870–1877)
- Wolfgang Larrazábal (1911–2003), former president (1958–1959)
- Eleazar López Contreras (1883–1973), former president (1935–1941)
- Leopoldo López (born 1971), former mayor of the Chacao municipality (2000–2008)
- Eduardo Machado (1910–1985), lawyer, politician
- Gustavo Machado (1898–1983), lawyer, politician
- José Tomás Machado Afanador (1788 - 1862), militar, politician
- Luis Alberto Machado (1936-2016), lawyer, essayst, politician
- María Corina Machado (born 1967), engineer, politician, Peace Nobel Prize 2025
- Óscar Machado Zuloaga (1920–1988), engineer, entreprenour, politician
- Henrique Machado Zuloaga (1931–2023), engineer, entreprenour
- Nicolás Maduro (born 1962), president of Venezuela (2013–)
- Pompeyo Márquez (born 1922), former minister of borders (1994–1999)
- Isaías Medina Angarita (1897–1953), former president (1941–1945)
- Aloha Núñez (born 1983), former Minister of Indigenous Peoples of Venezuela
- Fabricio Ojeda (1929–1966), former guerrilla fighter
- José Antonio Páez (1790–1873) former president (1830–1835; 1839–1843; 1861–1863)
- Dori Parra de Orellana (1923–2007), former governor and senator of Lara state
- Jacinta Parejo de Crespo (1845–1914), former First Lady of Venezuela (1884–1886; 1892–1898)
- Carlos Andrés Pérez (1922–2010), politician, former president (1974–1979; 1989–1993)
- Marcos Pérez Jiménez (1914–2001), militar, former president (1952–1958)
- Teodoro Petkoff (1932–2018), economist, former guerrilla fighter and minister of the central office of coordination and planning (1996–1999)
- José Vicente Rangel (born 1929), lawyer, journalist, former vice president (2002–2007) and minister of foreign affairs (1991–2001)
- Alí Rodríguez Araque (1937–2018), former ambassador to Cuba (2014–2018), minister of foreign affairs (2004–2006), minister of finance (2008–2010), and general secretary of OPEC (2000–2002)
- Irene Sáez (born 1961), former mayor of the Chacao municipality (1993–1998) and governor of Nueva Esparta (1999–2000)
- Juan Manuel Sucre Figarella (1925–1996), militar, former minister of defense (1974–1975)
- Leopoldo Sucre Figarella (1926–1996), former governor of Bolívar (1958–1959) and minister of public works (1960–1969)
- Alirio Ugarte Pelayo (1923–1967), lawyer, former governor of Monagas (1948–1951) and ambassador to Mexico (1959–1962)
- Laureano Vallenilla Lanz (1870–1936), sociologist who occupied the presidency of the congress for 20 years during the Juan Vicente Gomez regime.
- Clara Vidal (born 1983), Minister of Indigenous Peoples of Venezuela
- Guillermo Tell Villegas (1823–1907), lawyer, former president (1868; 1870; 1892)
- Ramón José Velásquez (born 1916), historian, journalist, former president (1993–1994)
- Jóvito Villalba (1908–1981), founder of the Democratic Republican Union party (URD, by its initials in Spanish)
- Ezequiel Zamora (1817–1860), militar leader of the Federalists in the Federal War

== Science ==
- Manuel Blum, winner of the Turing Award
- Freddy Cachazo, winner of the Breakthrough Prize in Fundamental Physics
- Humberto Fernández-Morán, researcher and founder of the Venezuelan Institute for Neurological and Brain Studies (now Venezuelan Institute for Scientific Research), who developed the diamond knife, winner of the John Scott Medal.
- Carlota Perez, technology scholar and economist
- William H. Phelps, ornithologist and founder of Radio Caracas Radio
- Aldemaro Romero Jr. (born 1951), scientist, communicator, advocate of liberal arts education
- Tobías Lasser, botanist, founder of the Botanic Garden of Caracas.
- Marcel Roche, physician and educator.

=== Medicine ===
- Pablo Acosta Ortiz, surgeon, academic and politician.
- Carlos Arvelo, military surgeon in the 19th century, and rector of the Central University of Venezuela from 1846 until 1849.
- Baruj Benacerraf, Venezuelan-born American, Nobel Prize of Medicine in 1980.
- Sara Bendahan, the first Venezuelan woman to complete her medical degree in that country.
- Maruja Clavier, was one of the first Venezuelan nuclear oncologists.
- Jacinto Convit, medic and scientist, known for developing a vaccine to fight leprosy and his studies to cure different types of cancer.
- Francisco De Venanzi, Venezuelan doctor, scientist, scholar, and rector of the Central University of Venezuela.
- José Del Vecchio, pioneered both sports medicine and youth baseball development.
- Arnoldo Gabaldón, pioneered in anti-malaria campaign.
- Saint José Gregorio Hernández, physician and Catholic religious figure.
- José María Vargas, modernized the Medicine studies in Venezuela in the second half of the 19th century.

== Sports ==
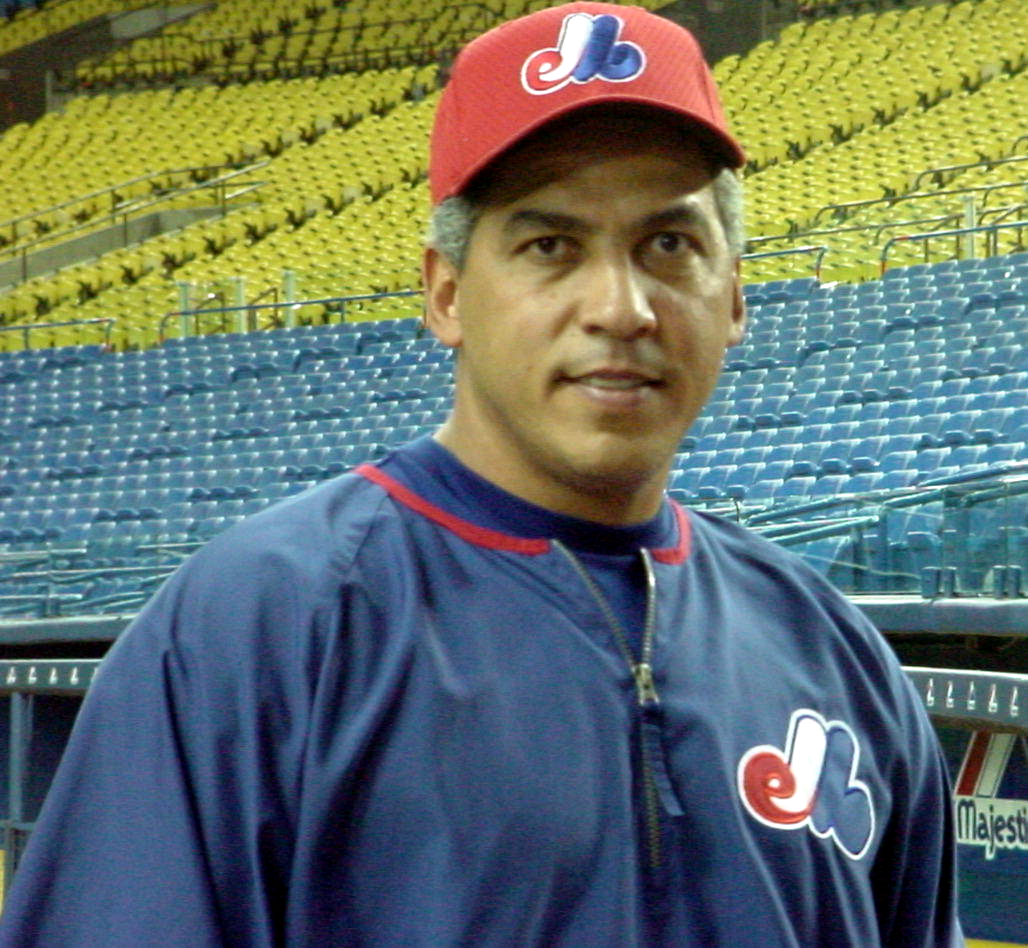
Andrés Galarraga

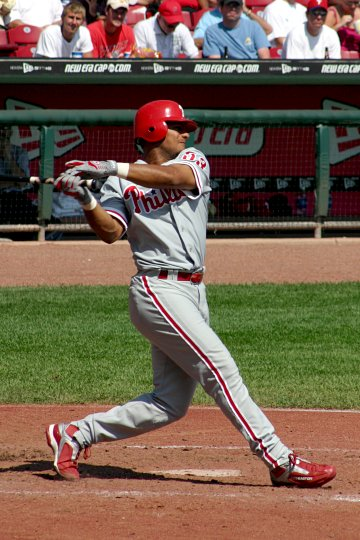
Bobby Abreu

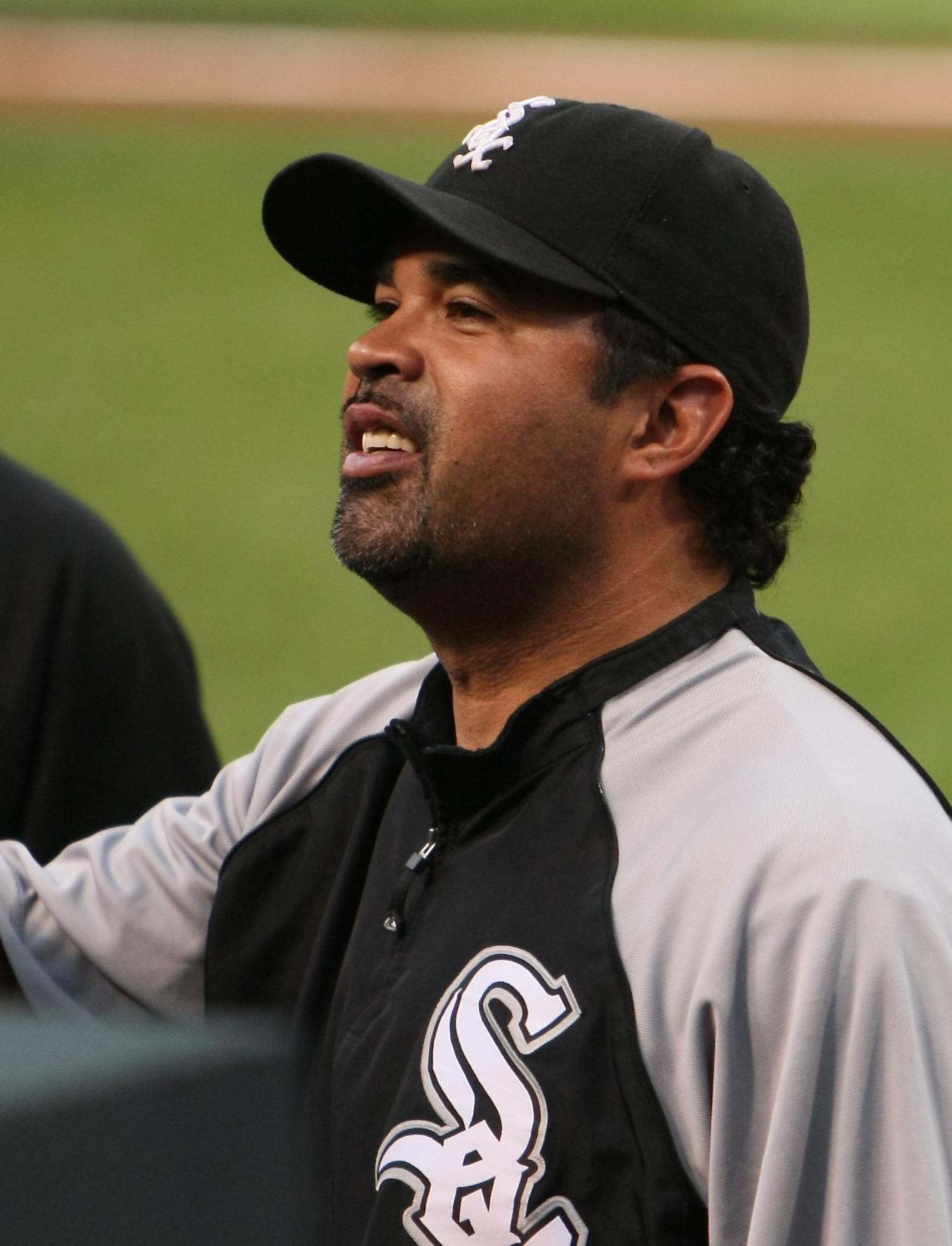
Ozzie Guillén

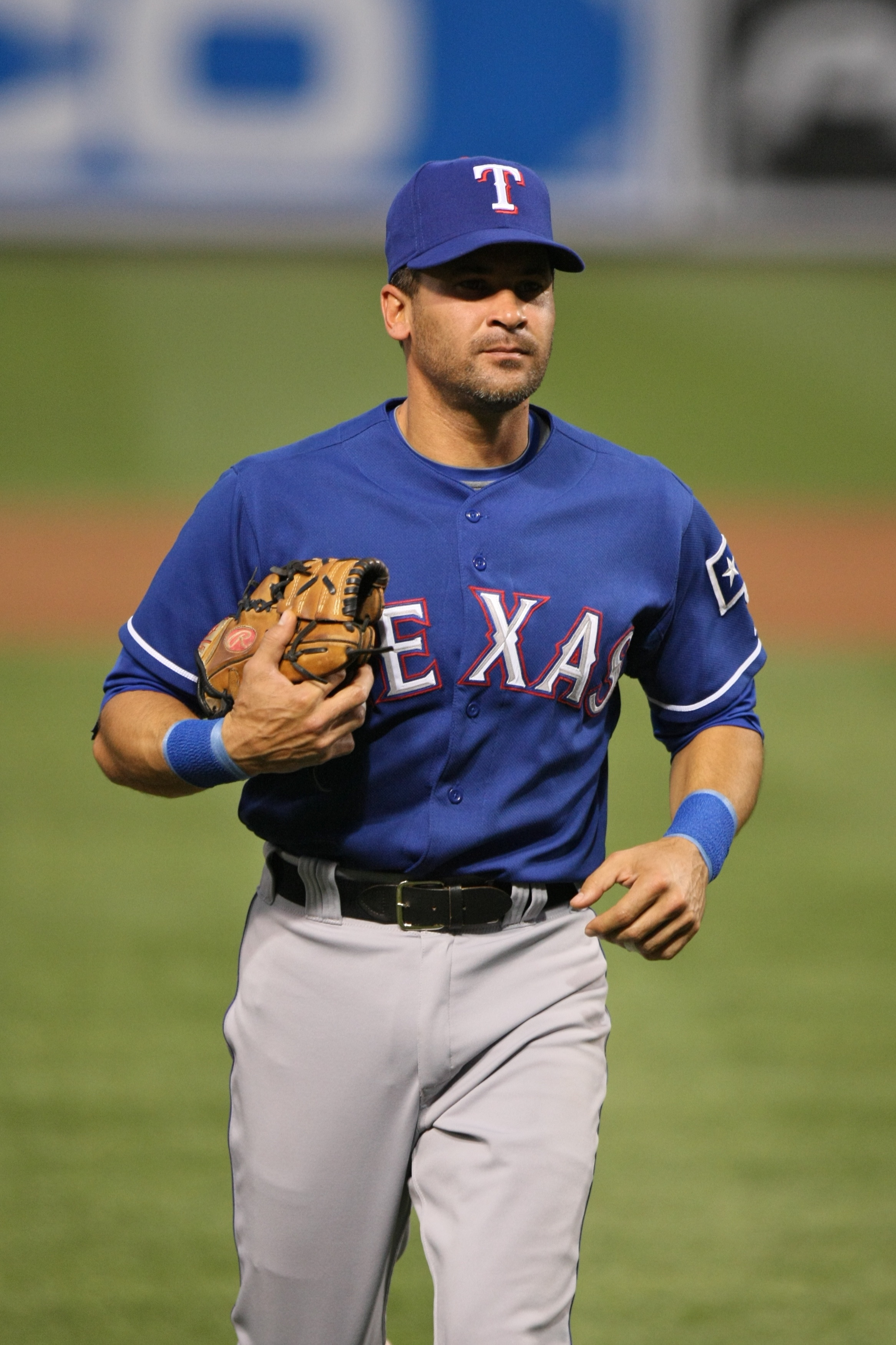
Omar Vizquel

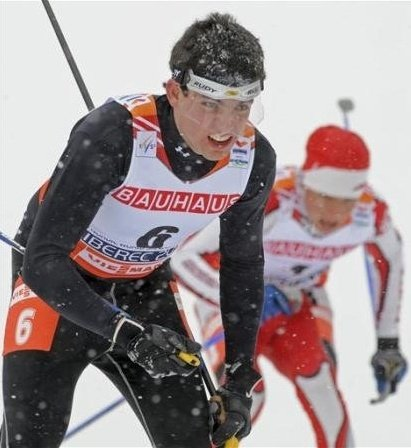
César Baena

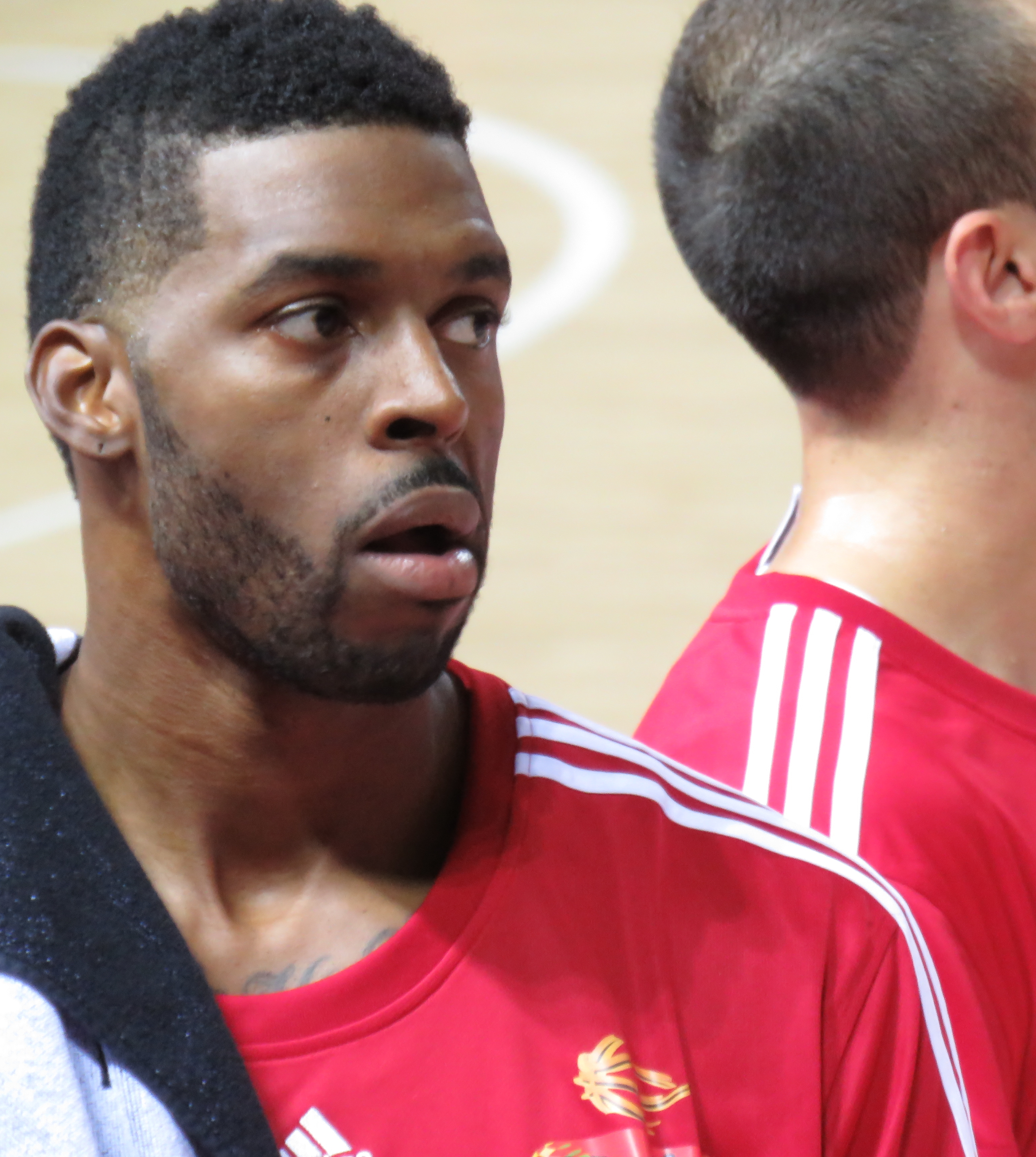
Donta Smith

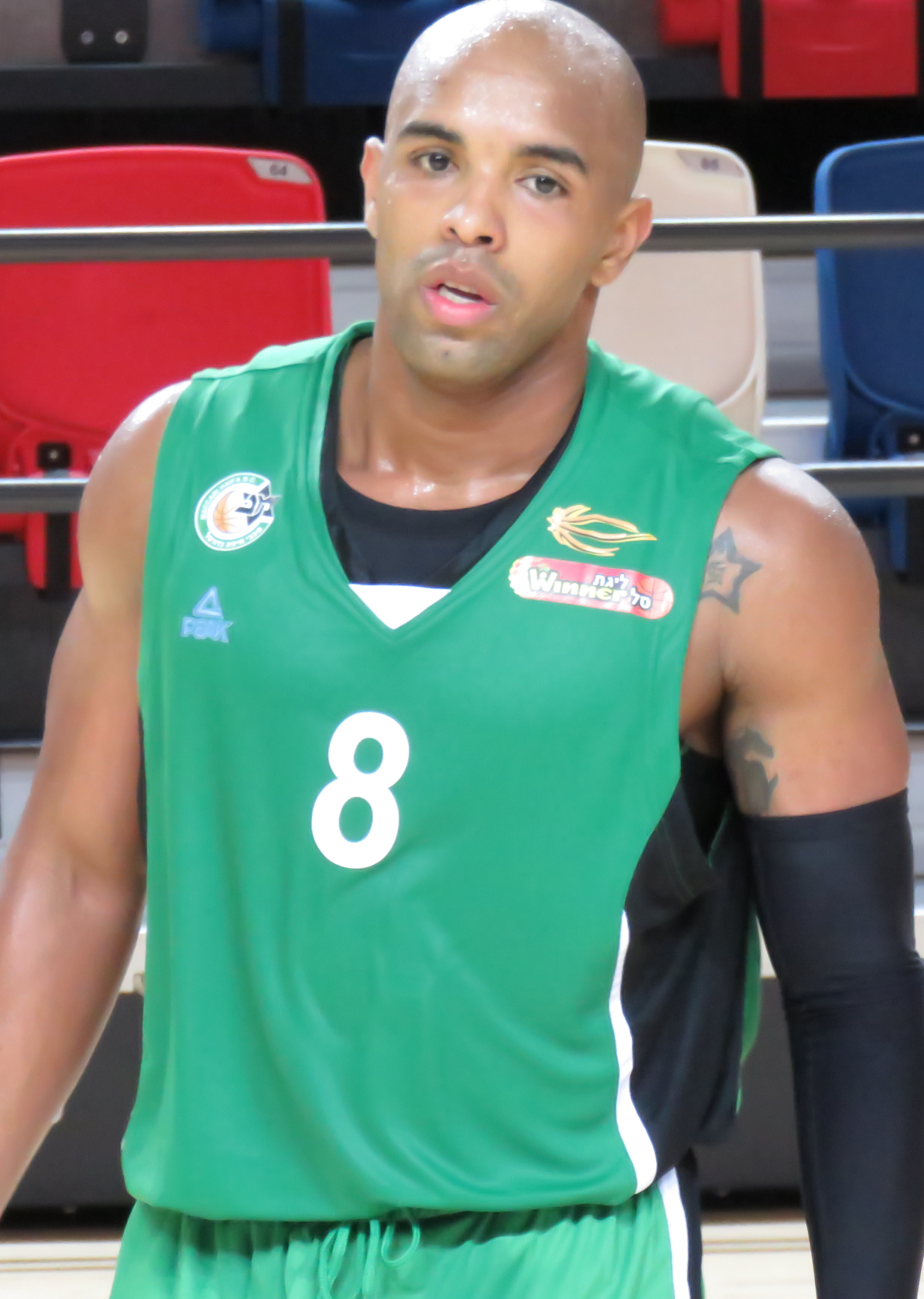
Gregory Vargas

=== Baseball ===
See also:
List of players from Venezuela in Major League Baseball
Venezuelan Baseball Hall of Fame and Museum

- Bobby Abreu
- Wilyer Abreu
- Teolindo Acosta
- Luisangel Acuña
- Ronald Acuña Jr.
- Edgardo Alfonzo
- José Alguacil
- Jose Altuve
- José Alvarado (baseball)
- Francisco Álvarez
- Alexi Amarista
- Luis Aparicio
- Luis Aparicio, Sr.
- Francisco Arcia
- Orlando Arcia
- Oswaldo Arcia
- Antonio Armas
- Luis Arráez
- Willians Astudillo
- Héctor Benítez
- Dámaso Blanco
- Henry Blanco
- José 'Carrao' Bracho
- Silvino Bracho
- Ángel Bravo
- Alex Cabrera
- Asdrúbal Cabrera
- Miguel Cabrera
- Oswaldo Cabrera
- Miguel Cairo
- Daniel 'Chino' Canónico
- Giovanni Carrara
- Carlos Carrasco
- Alejandro Carrasquel
- Alfonso 'Chico' Carrasquel
- José Antonio Casanova
- Antonio Castillo
- José Castillo
- José Castillo
- Harold Castro
- Roger Cedeño
- Endy Chávez
- Jackson Chourio
- David Concepción
- William Contreras
- Willson Contreras
- Emilio Cueche
- Luis 'Camaleón' García
- Francisco Cervelli
- Pompeyo Davalillo
- Víctor Davalillo
- Enmanuel De Jesús
- Baudilio Díaz
- Elías Díaz
- Alcides Escobar
- Eduardo Escobar
- Kelvim Escobar
- Álvaro Espinoza
- Dalmiro Finol
- Wilmer Flores
- Andrés Galarraga
- Maikel García
- Álex González
- Carlos González
- Geremi González
- Carlos Guillén
- Oswaldo Guillén
- Jesús Guzmán
- Enzo Hernández
- Félix Hernández
- Ramón Hernández
- Richard Hidalgo
- Luis Lara
- Luis Leal
- Felipe Lira
- Pablo López
- Vidal López
- Bobby Marcano
- Germán Márquez
- Carlos Martínez
- Víctor Martínez
- Luis Matos
- Carlos Mendoza (baseball manager)
- Ramón Monzant
- Melvin Mora
- Gabriel Moreno
- Oswaldo Olivares
- Magglio Ordóñez
- Pedro Pagés (catcher)
- Daniel Palencia
- Al Pedrique
- Luis Peñalver
- David Peralta
- Oswald Peraza
- Eddie Pérez
- Hernán Pérez (baseball)
- Martín Pérez
- Salvador Pérez
- Roberto Petagine
- Gregorio Petit
- José Pirela
- Gustavo Polidor
- Alex Ramírez
- Chucho Ramos
- Wilson Ramos
- Luis Rengifo
- Juan Rivera
- Carlos Rivero
- Brayan Rocchio
- Eduardo Rodríguez
- Francisco Rodríguez
- Miguel Rojas
- Luis Romero Petit
- José Rondón
- Keibert Ruiz
- Luis Salazar
- Aníbal Sánchez
- Anthony Santander
- Johan Santana
- Marco Scutaro
- Antonio Senzatela
- Luis Sojo
- Les Straker
- Eugenio Suárez
- Ranger Suárez
- Robert Suárez
- Gleyber Torres
- César Tovar
- Ezequiel Tovar
- Wilfredo Tovar
- Manny Trillo
- Luis Valbuena
- Guillermo Vento
- Omar Vizquel
- Luis Zuloaga

=== Basketball ===
- John Cox
- Carl Herrera
- Donta Smith
- Óscar Torres
- Gregory Vargas (born 1986)
- Greivis Vásquez

=== Bodybuilding ===
- Fannie Barrios
- Yaxeni Oriquen-Garcia
- Betty Viana-Adkins

=== Boxing ===
- Alfonso Blanco
- Antonio Esparragoza
- Luis Estaba
- Carlos Morocho Hernandez
- Betulio González
- Jorge Linares
- Alexander Muñoz
- Lorenzo Parra
- Edwin Valero

=== Bowling ===
- Reydnier Chavez
- Amleto Monacelli

=== Cycling ===
- Hersony Canelon
- Stefany Hernández
- Daniela Larreal
- José Rujano
- Miguel Ubeto

=== Fencing ===
- Silvio Fernandez
- Francisco Limardo
- Rubén Limardo

=== Horse racing ===
- Junior Alvarado, jockey
- Juan Arias, race horse trainer
- Gustavo Avila, jockey
- Abel Castellano, Jr.
- Javier Castellano, jockey
- Eibar Coa, jockey
- Gustavo Delgado, race horse trainer
- Ramón Domínguez, jockey
- Sonny Leon, jockey
- Domingo Noguera Mora, race horse trainer
- Mario di Polo, race horse trainer

=== Motorcycle racing ===
- Johnny Cecotto
- Carlos Lavado
- Iván Palazzese
- Robertino Pietri
- Andrea Ippolito

=== Polo ===
- Victor Vargas

=== Rugby ===
- Serge Blanco

=== Soccer ===
- Gilberto Angelucci
- Juan Arango
- Deyna Castellanos
- Roberto Cavallo
- Gabriel Cichero
- José Luis Dolgetta
- Wuilker Fariñez
- Vito Fassano
- Nicolas Fedor
- Juan Pablo Galavis
- Massimo Margiotta
- Josef Martínez
- Alejandro Moreno
- Daniel Nikolac
- Richard Páez
- Tomás Rincón
- Stalin Rivas
- Salomón Rondón
- Giovanni Savarese
- Jefferson Savarino
- Yeferson Soteldo
- Renny Vega
- José Vidal

=== Sports car racing ===
- Johnny Cecotto
- Johnny Cecotto Jr.
- Ettore Chimeri
- Pancho Pepe Cróquer
- Milka Duno
- Pastor Maldonado, Formula One driver
- Enzo Potolicchio
- Alex Popow
- Ernesto José Viso

=== Swimming ===
- María Elena Giusti
- María Hung
- Andreina Pinto
- Yanel Pinto
- Francisco Sanchez
- Alberto Mestre
- Albert Subirats
- Rafael Vidal

=== Tennis ===
- Jorge Andrew
- Juan Carlos Bianchi
- José de Armas
- Alfonso Mora
- Garbiñe Muguruza
- Gabriela Paz Franco
- Nicolás Pereira
- Maurice Ruah
- Milagros Sequera
- David Souto
- Roberto Maytín
- Jimy Szymanski
- Daniel Vallverdu
- María Vento-Kabchi

=== Track and field ===
- Clive Bonas
- Albert Bravo
- Joselyn Brea
- Víctor Castillo
- Daniel Cereali
- Teófilo Davis Bell
- Arquimedes Herrera
- Ahymara Espinoza
- Horacio Esteves
- Brigido Iriarte
- Horacio Esteves
- Asnoldo Devonish
- Yoger Medina
- Erick Phillips
- Rafael Romero
- Pachencho Romero
- Hector Thomas
- Lloyd Murad
- Victor Maldonado
- Robeilys Peinado
- José Peña
- Néstor Nieves
- Félix Mata
- Rosa Rodríguez
- Yulimar Rojas
- William Wuycke

=== Yachting ===
- Daniel Camejo Octavio
- Peter Camejo
