= Luis Mariano Rivera =

- Born: August 19, 1906; Canchunchú Valley, Sucre State, Venezuela
- Died: March 15, 2002 (aged 95)

Luis Mariano Rivera (1906-2002) was a Venezuelan singer, composer, poet, and dramatist.

He was born on August 19, 1906, and was a self-taught musician. He wrote hundreds of songs that have been performed by musicians including Morella Muñoz, Jesús Sevillano, Gualberto Ibarreto, Juan Carlos Salazar, Cecilia Todd, Lilia Vera, Simón Díaz, Serenata Guayanesa and Un Solo Pueblo. Biographer Rafael Salazar wrote in his book “Luis Mariano Rivera, Poet and Singer of Express Canchunchú”: “Few popular poets and musicians have had the privilege to be recognized by so many people, regional and national institutions”. Luis Mariano Rivera died on March 15, 2002.

== See also ==
- Venezuelan music
