= Juan Carlos Salazar (musician) =

Venezuelan musician (died 2024)

Juan Carlos Salazar (April 2, 1962 – September 20, 2024) was a Venezuelan-born singer and cuatro player. Salazar was born in Caripito, a small oil town in the State of Monagas. Interested in singing, the guitar, and the cuatro from an early age, Salazar learned to play by ear and later took piano lessons in Fort Collins, Colorado.

Salazar began his singing career by accident. While in high school he was selected to play the “cuatro” for a fellow student who was to represent their school in a nationwide singing competition. Three days before the big event, the singer developed an acute case of laryngitis. Too late to retire the school from the contest, the principal searched desperately for a replacement. The only student that knew the song was Salazar. At the age of 16, without ever taking a singing lesson, Salazar walked to the center of the stage and trembling all over sang the song. Upsetting all the favorites, Salazar won first prize and national recognition.

Salazar was an accomplished performer with over twenty years of experience. He has performed internationally to “standing room only crowds” and in intimate settings in Venezuela, Dominican Republic, San Diego (CA), Miami, Orlando, Gainesville and Tampa (FL), Denver and Fort Collins (CO), San Juan (PR), Madrid (Spain), Bonn and Stuttgart (Germany), Brussels (Belgium), The Hague (Netherlands), Paris (France), London (England), Zurich and Berna (Switzerland). Since 2009 he lives currently in Orlando, Florida State.

Salazar died on September 20, 2024, aged 62.

== Discography ==
Salazar recorded twelve solo albums and was invited to collaborate in four additional Venezuelan compilations. Salazar recorded albums with two popular musicians and singers from Venezuela, Hernán Gamboa and Gualberto Ibarreto. Hernán Gamboa participated as a singer and cuatro player in the CD titled "Raices y Motivos" (2004). Gualberto Ibarreto has participated in two of Salazar's productions, "Anhelos" (2005) and "Amo, Canto y Sueño" (2006).

Salazar has also recorded a CD with traditional Venezuelan songs for kids. The CD entitled "Pa' los Chamos" contains 13 songs that children in Venezuela learn during kindergarten and elementary school years. In this CD, Salazar's children, Ana Carolina, Francia Alejandra and Carlos Andrés participated doing vocals.

Salazar was invited by Julio Iglesias to share the stage during a concert in Denver after being heard singing in the audience. During his career, Salazar has also participated in concerts featuring other famous singers such as José Luis Rodríguez "El Puma", María Teresa Chacín, Hernán Gamboa, among many others.

== See also ==
- List of Venezuelans
