= Fernando Adames Torres =

Venezuelan entrepreneur and member of the military in the 19th century

General Fernando Adames Torre
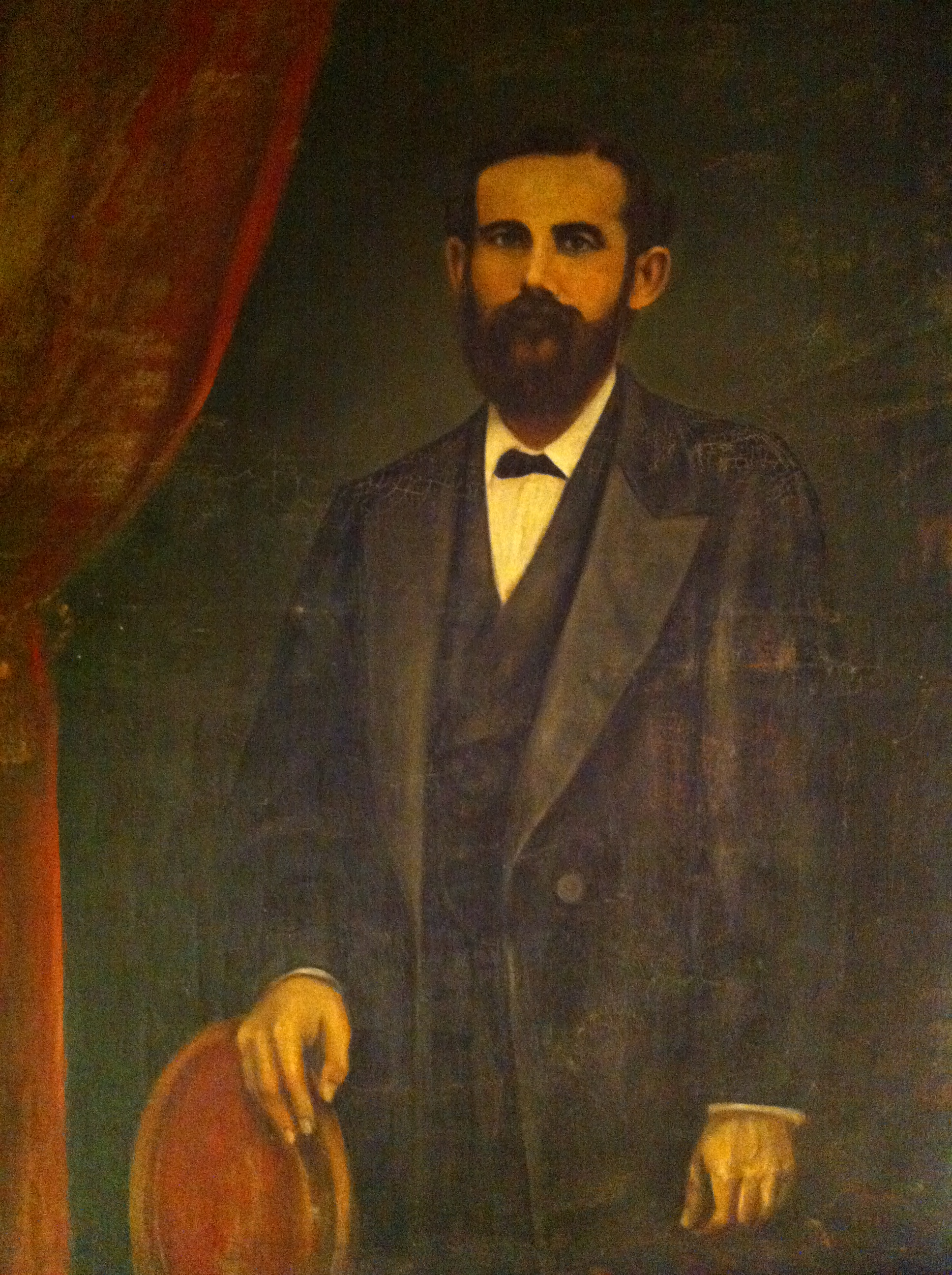
- Born: Fernando Adames Torres; March 1, 1837; Siquisique, Venezuela
- Died: September 3, 1910 (aged 73); Barquisimeto, Venezuela
- Occupation(s): General, Vanezuelan Military and Senator of Lara State Venezuela
- Title: General, Senator, Commander and Chief

Fernando Adames Torres (1 March 1837 – 3 September 1910) was a Venezuelan military officer, politician, and entrepreneur. He served in the Venezuelan Federal War under Mariscal Juan Crisóstomo Falcón and later held several senior military and political roles, including Commander-in-Chief of the Venezuelan Army and Senator representing Lara State.

== Early life ==
He was born in Siquisique, a small city near Barquisimeto on Lara State in the country of Venezuela. He was the son of Juan Bautista Adames and Magdalena Torres. During his early years prior to entering the Military, Fernando Adames spent most of his time as a business entrepreneur, until March 1858 where he joined the military during the Revolution of 1858 serving under the orders of Mariscal Falcon. This revolution lasted five years and ended with the formation of the "Federacion Venezolana".

== Military positions and honors ==
During his time in the military, General Fernando Adames held many high positions in the government including "Jefe de Estado Mayor del Ejército Venezolano", a very high position in the military. In this role, he served directly under Mariscal Falcon, who was the highest ranked officer during the time. Later in his official military career, General Fernando Adames was named as President of the State of Barquisimeto, a position which he did not accept. Later he was twice Commander and Chief of the Venezuelan Military, and he served as Senator representing his native state in the Venezuelan House of Congress.

General Fernando Adames Torres received several letters of commendation for valor and leadership from President Antonio Guzman Blanco for maintaining peace in the territories governed by General Adames.

== Important family members ==
- General Fernando Adames Torres was married to Dolores Garcia, and they had a son they named Belarmino Adames Garcia, who also became a General in the Venezuelan military.
- General Belarmino Adames Garcia married Laura Santi, the daughter of Admiral Jose Minos Santi, also a member of the Venezuelan military.
- General Fernando Adames Torres was the grandson of General Pedro Leon Torres (see link below in the references for additional information on General Torres).

== Additional pictures ==
Letters written by President Antonio Guzman Blanco to General Fernando Adames

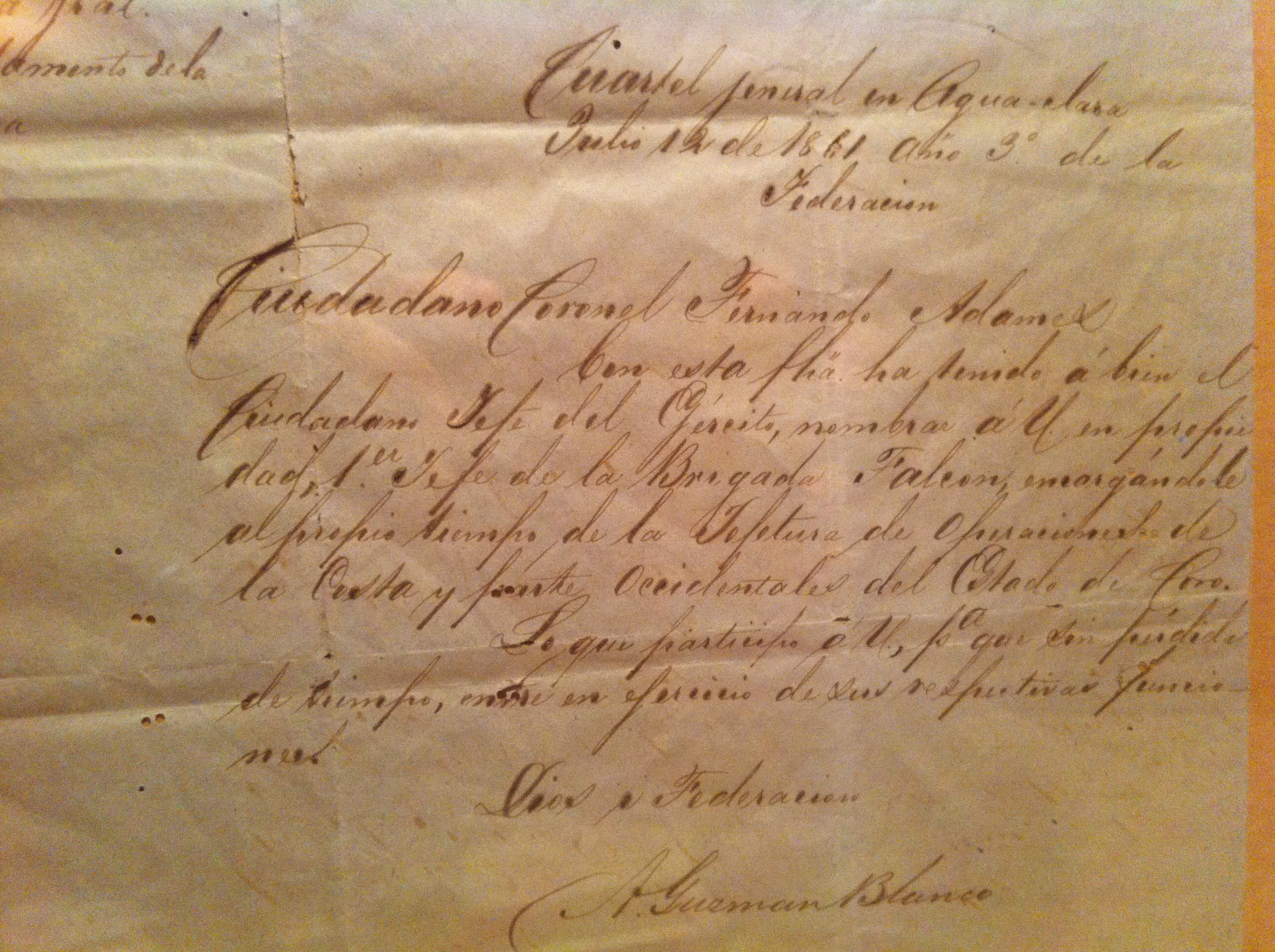
Letter From President Antonio Guzman Blanco to General Fernando Adames

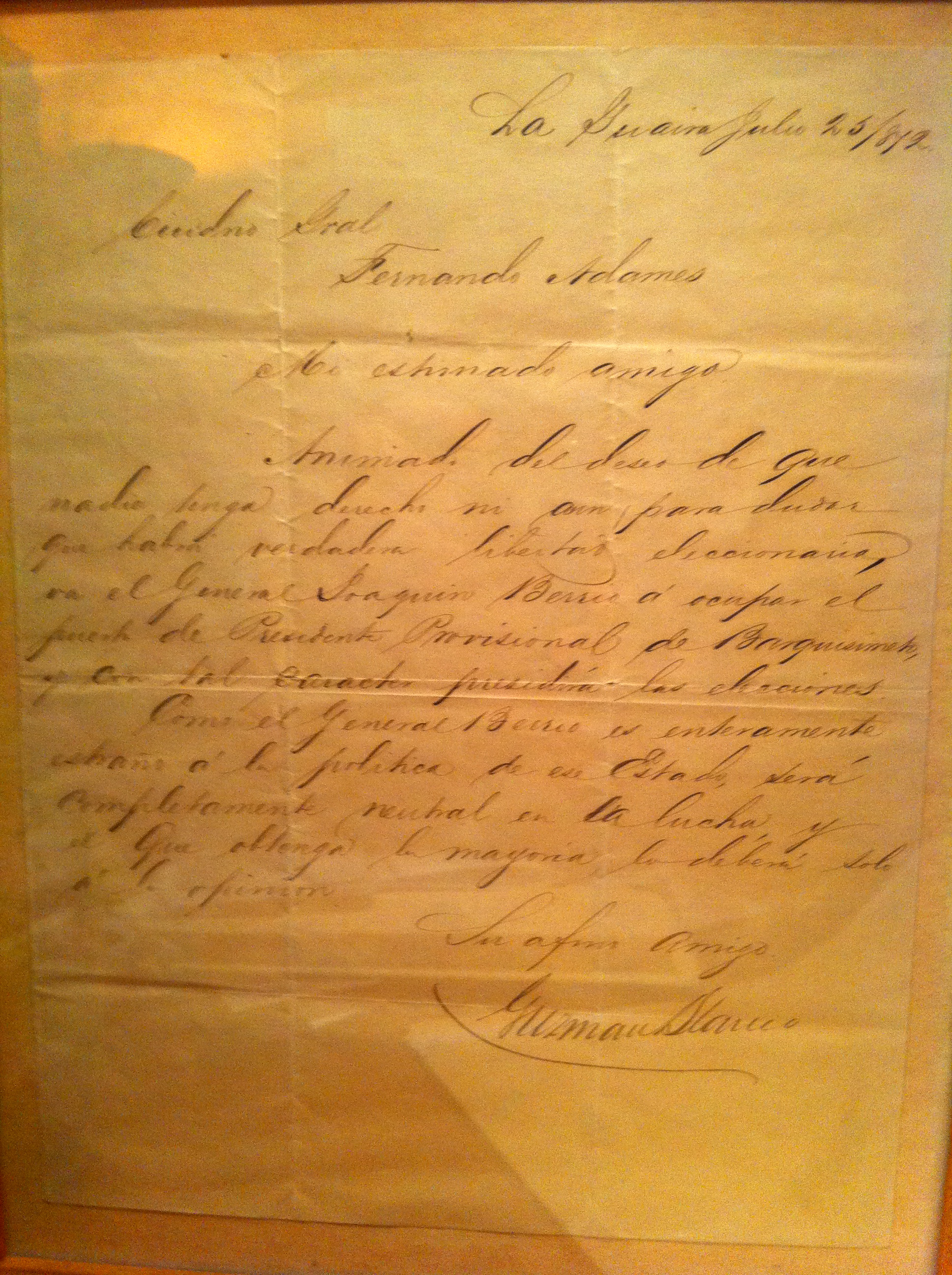
Letter From President Antonio Guzman Blanco to General Fernando Adames

== Author ==
Mauricio Adames Posada (Great, Great Grandson of General Fernando Adames Torres)

== See also ==
- Venezuela
- Venezuelan government
- List of Venezuelans
