= Previsora Tower =

Coordinates: 10.5000°N 66.9167°W

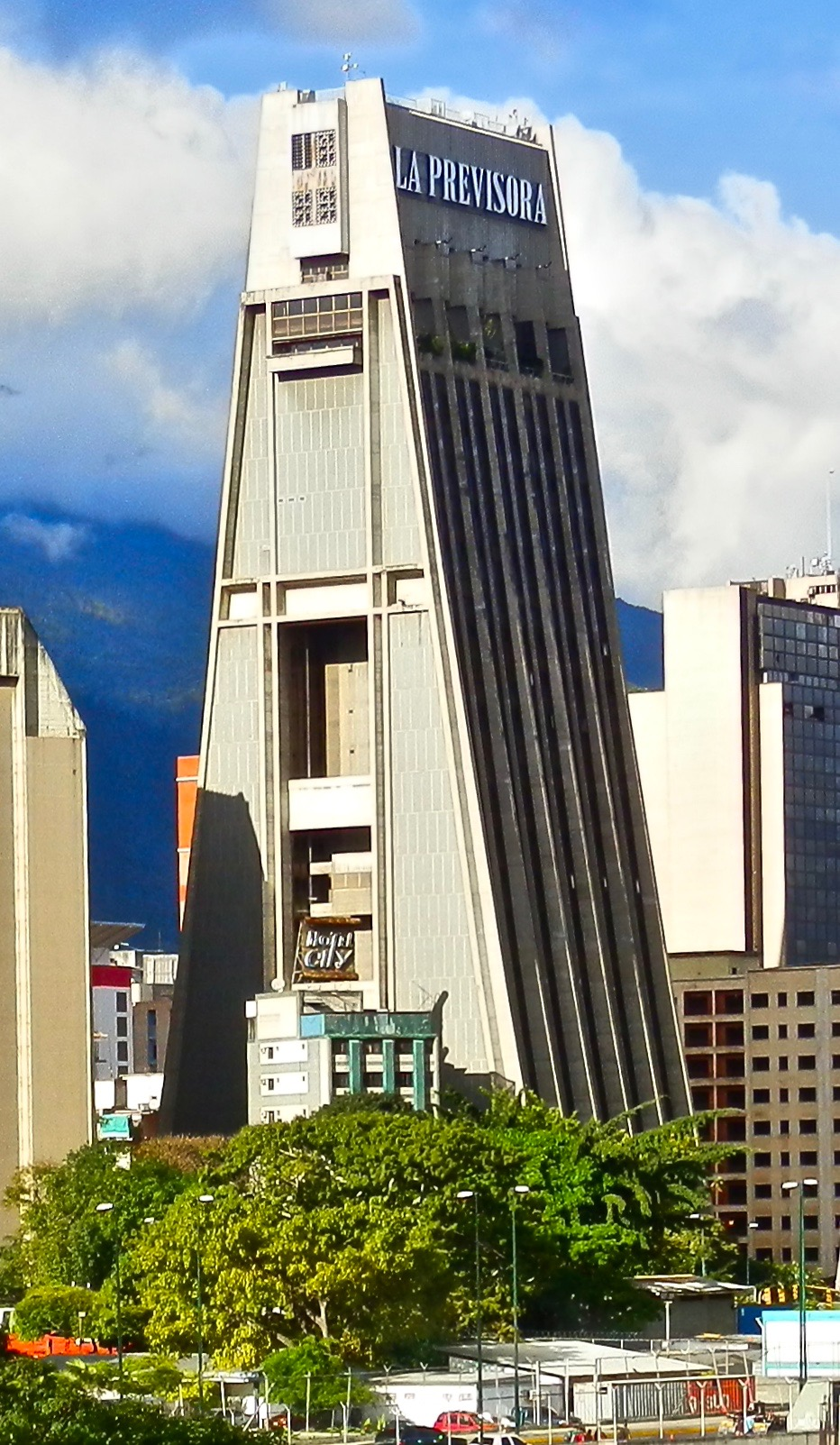
- Interactive map of the Previsora Tower area

General information
- Status: Completed
- Type: Office
- Location: Caracas, Venezuela
- Construction started: 1970
- Completed: 1973
- Cost: 34.000 Bs.F.
- Owner: Seguros La Previsora C. A.

Height
- Roof: 117 m (384 ft)

Technical details
- Floor count: 24

Design and construction
- Architects: Bernardo Borges, Francisco Pimentel and Jacobo Koifman

The Previsora Tower (Spanish: Torre Previsora) is an office skyscraper located in sector Plaza Venezuela in Caracas, Venezuela and is the headquarters of the company Seguros La Previsora. Construction of the tower began in 1970 and finally was inaugurated in 1973. This is one of the most emblematic architectural figures of Caracas characterized by a Patek Phillipe luminous clock, which is visible from various points of the capital city.
