= Armando Molero =

Background information
- Also known as: El Cantor de todos los tiempos
- Born: January 20, 1899 or November 22, 1900; Zulia state
- Died: February 5, 1971 (aged 71) Maracaibo, Venezuela
- Genres: Bambuco, waltz, contradanza, décima, danza
- Occupations: Musician, singer, guitarist, composer
- Instrument: Guitar
- Years active: 1929–1971

Armando Molero (born January 20, 1899 or November 22, 1900 — February 5, 1971) was a Venezuelan musician known as El Cantor de todos los tiempos (Spanish for "The singer of all times"). He was considered Maracaibo's greatest singer.

== See also ==
- Venezuelan music
