= Humberto Rivas Mijares =

Humberto Rivas Mijares (1918–1981) was a Venezuelan writer, journalist and diplomat. He was born in Valencia, Venezuela on December 21, 1918, and died in Caracas on November 23, 1981.

== Life and career ==
He spent his teenage years on a coffee plantation in Nirgua with a paternal uncle after the death of his father. He lived among various agricultural communities and activities, many experiences that would mark his first literary works such as Gleba, Ocho relatos (Gleba, eight stories) and Hacia el Sur (Towards the south), published between 1942 and 1944.

In Hacia el Sur (Towards the south) there is an interesting description of agrarian Venezuela which changed its course towards the city.

In 1949 he published El Murado (The walled in) his masterpiece. This is one of the first stories of modern Venezuela. The agrarian country lags behind and makes room for the inner man. This work is part of most anthologies of Venezuelan and Latin American Storytellers.

One of the works that best describes the author as a man of ideals is certainly Cuando cayó el Miliciano (When the Militiaman fell). In 1961, he translated Poemas Piaroas (Piaroas Poems), interesting Venezuelan aboriginal poems into Italian (Rome, Italy). His last literary work was the story La Trompeta (The Trumpet) which remains an interesting sketch where a deceased presided over his own funeral himself playing the trumpet: There they go: the priest, the grocer, the druggist, the carpenter, the trumpet, the dead. The Cross, the mouth that murmurs. The rosary held high between the fingers. the sound of the trumpet. the air that turns golden. The beloved death.

His brother Gustavo Rivas-Mijares was born on November 7, 1922, in Valencia, Carabobo, Venezuela. Graduated as Civil Engineer at Central University of Venezuela. Master of Science of University Michigan.

Professor of civil engineering of Central University of Venezuela, since 1951. Dean Graduate School, 1973–1976, dean engineering, 1972–1973. President Academy Ciencias Fisicas, Matematicas y Naturales, Caracas, 1981–1985.

Director of Venezuela Institute of Science Research, 1974–1979, since 1984. Member National Council of Scientific & Technology Research, Caracas, since 1984, National Environmental Council, Caracas, 1984–1985. President of Venezuelan Chapter Water Pollution Control Federation, 1965–1983.

Works: Water Supply and Sewerage, 1957, 1966, 1976, 1984. Water Treatment Plants, 1963. Waste Water Treatment, 1967 (Universidad Central de Venezuela award, 1979), 1978. Temas Universitarios, 1969.
