= Antonio Ladislao Alcantara =

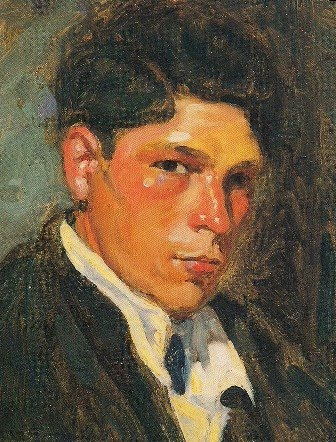
Antonio Ladislao Alcantara

Antonio L. Alcántara (born in Caracas on June 27, 1898 and died December 2, 1991) was a plastic artist, urban developer, thinker and businessman. He was one of the founders of the impressionist/pointillist movement in Venezuela and founding member of the School of Caracas.

== Painter of Avila ==
He was well known for his novel chromatic interpretations of the Caracas Valley, the Avila Mountains, the Litoral Central as well as other landscapes around the world. His paintings attracted attention not only for the quality of his craft but for his unique technique that captured the essence of midday tropical light and sunsets. The importance of his work earned him the name "Painter of Avila", an honor he shares with his contemporary Manuel Cabré - (January 25, 1890 – February 26, 1984). His fruitful career spanned over eight decades, although he was most prolific between 1915 and 1930 and 1950 and 1980. Antonio Alcantara painted all over Venezuela, Latin America, the Caribbean, Europe and Asia. Between 1925 and 1950 he dedicated the bulk of his time to private business in order to provide support to his extensive family. As businessman, Alcantara developed large portions of the San Agustin neighborhood in Caracas (residential housing), upscale residential housing in what is now the Chacao District, La Guaira and many buildings throughout the city.

== Education ==
Antonio Alcantara studied at the Caracas School of Fine Arts (1917–1923), under the guidance of Cruz Álvarez García, Pedro Zerpa, and other leading artists of that generation. Early in his career, he was awarded a scholarship to study in Paris, but the outbreak of World War I led to the cancellation of his studies in Europe. Throughout his adult life, Alcantara travelled to Europe, where he spent significant periods of time independently studying the old masters. At the Academy, his friends and classmates included Egea Lopez, Pedro Centeno Vallenilla, Abdon Pinto and Luis Alfredo Lopez Mendez. Throughout his long career, he received multiple awards and recognitions both in Venezuela and internationally.
