= Ana María Raga =

Venezuelan musician

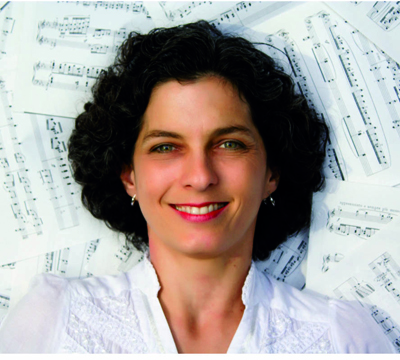
- Ana María Raga partituras fondo
- Born: December 16, 1967; Caracas, Venezuela
- Occupation: Conductor

Ana María Raga (Caracas, Venezuela, December 16, 1967) is a Venezuelan musician, choir and orchestra director, pianist, arranger, composer and teacher. She has won national and international prizes in the field of choral singing. She is the founder and president of the Aequalis Foundation.

Choirs directed by her:

- Aequalis Aurea, female voices
- Colegio Humboldt Choral Project, children and adolescents (between 4 and 17 years)
- MonteAvila University Choir
- Schola Cantorum de Venezuela, formerly Schola Cantorum de Caracas which she directs with Maria Guinand

== Training ==
Raga started her training as a musician at the “Juan Manuel Olivares” Music School and obtained her Piano Performer degree in 1990 under the tutelage of Marisa Romera. She holds a bachelor's degree in Choral Conducting from the University Institute for Musical Studies (today Universidad de las Artes (UNEARTE) [University of the Arts]) obtained under the guidance of Alberto Grau. Raga has taken Composition and Choral Conducting Courses given by internationally recognized masters and professors such as Alberto Grau, Vic Nees, Robert Sund. Willy Gohl, Werner Pfaff, Erkki Pohjola, Helmuth Rilling and Frieder Bernius and Orchestral Conducting with Helmuth Rilling and Alfredo Rugeles. In 2013 she obtained her master's degree in Orchestral Conducting from the Simón Bolívar University (Caracas, Venezuela). Her graduate work was distinguished with a special mention and recommendation for publication. Currently she is studying for a post graduate degree in Music Therapy at the Universidad de los Andes.

== Academic and educational work ==
Professor Raga is a member of the Universidad de las Artes (UNEARTE) faculty where she teaches choral conducting. Furthermore, she collaborates as a professor training directors of children and youth choirs with the “Social Action through Music Program” sponsored by the Development Bank of Latin America (formerly known as Andean Development Corporation) in 8 countries. She has been a consultant to the Misión Música, managed by the Fundación Musical Simón Bolívar, also known as Fundación del Estado para el Sistema Nacional de Orquestas Juveniles e Infantiles de Venezuela (FESNOJIV) [National System of Youth and Children's Orchestras of Venezuela] for the development of a “Symphonic Choirs System”.

As a guest conductor and pedagogue Raga participates in numerous festivals and events in Europe, Asia, North and South America. In Venezuela she gives courses for Children Choir Directors in Caracas and the interior. She has held workshops on Children Choral Repertoire at the IV América Cantat (Caracas, Venezuela), at the IV Junior Europa Cantat (Vic, Spain) and at the V America Cantat (La Habana, Cuba, 2007) festivals. In Hungary she has given courses on Latin-American Children Choir Music for students of Choir Direction at the Liszt Academy of Music in collaboration with the Hungarian Radio Children's Choir (Budapest, Hungary, 2006). She has been invited to present workshops for children choir directors in León, Guanajuato, Mexico (2006) and on Latin-American Repertoire for Female Voices at the Busan Choral Festival and Competition in Korea (2007). In 2008 she attended an invitation to work with the choirs of the North American Choral Company in Grand Rapids, Michigan, USA and at the Sixth International Cedros UP Festival (FICUP) she held workshops for choir directors and on Latin-American Children Choir Music. In 2009 she participated as a workshop leader in the fields of Children Choir Direction and Vocal Technique at the 13th edition of the Ágora Vocal Technique and Choir Direction Courses in Segovia, Spain, organized by the Ágora Choir and sponsored by the Don Juan de Borbón Foundation. In 2010 and 2011 she organized a workshop on Latin-American Music for Mixed Choirs at the Alpe Adria Cantat Festival in Lignano, Italy. Also in 2011 she held workshops at the Europa Cantat Junior Festival in Estonia. In August 2012 she held a workshop on Old Latin American Music at the Europa Cantat Festival in Turin. In 2012 and 2013 she led the training workshops offered by NEOJIBA, the System for Orchestras and Choirs of Salvador de Bahia, Brazil. In 2013 she held workshops for the music school network in Medellín, Colombia.

Under her guidance, the Aequalis Foundation initiated in September 2012 a program of workshops and courses in continuing education for choir directors and choir singers in order to enhance their respective capabilities and performance, especially if they have not had any formal training.

She set up and worked for many years in the development of the Schola Foundation children choirs, “Pequeños Cantores de la Schola”, which currently constitute the program “Construir Cantando”.

In July 2009, the International Federation for Choral Music (IFCM) invited her to join its organizing committee and to participate as a speaker at the International Music Education and Singing Conference. Her presentation dealt with the Social Impact of Choral Singing and offered valuable insights from projects in Venezuela and the Andean region. Furthermore, she collaborates with international choral music research journals and publishers (see Publications). Under the auspices of the Aequalis Foundation and the IFCM she presented a poster on the same topic at the World Forum on Music organized by the International Council for Music in September 2011. More recently, in October 2013, she held a conference on Choir Singing, Social Capital and Human Development at the National Seminar on Music Education and Pedagogy organized by the Network of Music Schools in Medellín, Colombia.

She collaborates with international choral music and research publications (see Publications).

== Choirs ==
Raga has set up children choirs such as the Mater Salvatoris Children Choir and the "Pequeños Cantores de Altagracia". The latter one is the second choir that was created within the Schola Cantorum de Venezuela Foundation's “Pequeños Cantores” project, an educational initiative with a social component directed at children and adolescents. The Aequalis and Voces Prismas choirs for female voices were set up by Raga under the Aequalis Foundation umbrella. These two choirs have since merged to become the Aequalis Aurea Choir. Since 2003 Raga has been responsible for the Choral Project at the Humboldt School in Caracas. Since 1990 she has been directing the Schola Cantorum de Venezuela together with the director María Guinand.

Together with Professor Luimar Arismendi, she started the Schola Cantorum Youth Choir. It is the leading choir of all the Schola Cantorum de Venezuela Foundation children choir projects. Under Raga's and Arismendi's leadership, the choir has attained a level of excellence permitting it to participate in important international activities in recent years. Raga was its director until 2010.

== Awards and recognition ==
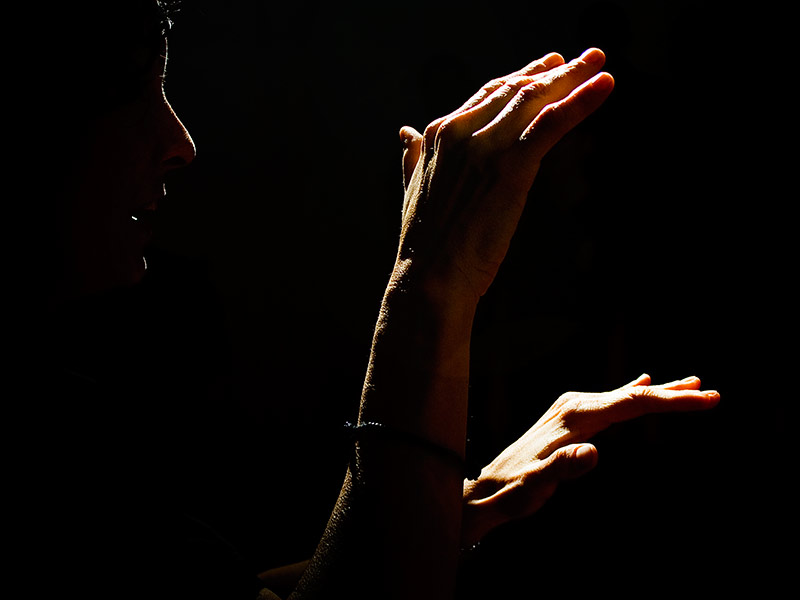
Raga directing in 2010

- Mention at the XXII Ciutat de Reus Composition for Children Choir Prize, Spain, 2012
- Audience Award. Humboldt School Choir. Lead Director. Festival D’Canto, Margarita, Venezuela, 2006
- Audience Award, Vicace 2001 Festival. Aequalis Choir. Lead Director. Veszprém, Hungary. 2001
- First Prize in the Folklore Music Category, International Des Moines Festival. Mater Salvatoris Choir. Lead Director. Iowa, USA, 1999.
- First Prize in the Choir Category, International Des Moines Festival. Mater Salvatoris Choir. Lead Director. Iowa, USA, 1999.
- 2nd Prize in Composition for Mixed Choirs at the 1st Procter & Gamble de Venezuela Choir Festival, 1991.
- Guido D'Arezzo Prize as Choir Singer of the Cantoría Alberto Grau, directed by María Guinand, Italy, 1989.
- Sole Spanish Music Prize at the National Silvia Eisenstein Piano Competition, Caracas, 1987.

== The Aequalis Foundation ==
The Aequalis Foundation is a non-profit organization that was set up by Ana María Raga in 2001. It is dedicated to investigation and training in music, the promotion of music, in particular the practice of choral music as a tool of artistic and human development, enhancing the quality of life no matter at what stage in life. Through the Foundation, Raga promotes the right every person has to discover the music inside of oneself and its transformative powers. She teaches the art form, promoting the appreciation of every day beauty. This is favorable to health, the development of intelligence. It is a vehicle for socialization and the formation of the values of cohabitation and social integration; in short, it is about the positive impact of music on the quality of life as much on the individual as on the collective level. Raga conceives and offers training workshops for choir conductors and music teachers. She works to disseminate and create new choral repertoire, develop projects that enhance audience appreciation and musical expression. Her programs and activities are based on choral practice of children, young people and seniors, using strategies that enhance cognitive capabilities, psychomotor activities, stimulate different dimensions of intelligence and favor socialization.

The Aequalis Foundation has offered choral activities in places where music can provide tools for social reinsertion and integration. An example is the women penitentiary (INOF – Instituto Nacional de Orientación Femenina) in Los Teques where the foundation initiated the creation of prison orchestras and choirs. This project has since been assumed by FundaMusical Bolívar (former FESNOJIV) and extended to other prisons.

Since its creation, the foundation has promoted the set-up of children and youth choirs achieving national and international recognition. Currently the Foundation manages the Aequalis Aurea (female voices) and the Humboldt School Choir Project (for children and youth from 4 to 17 years old). The latter one constitutes the platform for the Intercollegiate Choir Festival that has been organized since 2005 pursuing greater visibility for and promotion of choral practice that takes place in schools.

== Publications ==
Ana María Raga's creative work as a composer and arranger is centered on choral music. Some of her work has been published by Hinshaw Music, Inc. and Éditions À Coeur Joie. She has collaborated with Sounds in Europe, a publication of the European Music Council (Regional Group of the International Music Council) and with La Circular, a publication of the Secretariat for Children Choirs of Catalonia. Furthermore, she maintains her own blog, Sala de Ensayo, with articles and information about the choral world.
