= Higinia Bartolomé de Alamo =

Higinia Bartolomé Villegas (Actualidades, 1921)

Higinia Bartolomé de Alamo (1893-1991) was a Venezuelan poet and writer from Barquisimeto. A contemporary of professor Alberto Castillo Arráez, she was the wife of Dr. Antonio Alamo (1873-1953), Minister of Development and governor of Bolívar state during the government of Juan Vicente Gómez.
