= Ricardo Teruel =

- Born: 1956 (age 68–69); Venezuela
- Genres: Classical
- Occupations: Composer, and music educator
- Instrument: Piano
- Website: rtcompositor.blogspot.com/%20Website%20Ricardo%20Teruel

Ricardo Teruel (born January 1956 in Caracas) is a Venezuelan composer and pianist.

== Life ==
Teruel worked since 1983 at the Instituto de Fonología of the Centro Simón Bolívar. Since 1988, he is the Director of the Laboratory for Electronic Music. Since 1990 he is a Professor for composition and electronic music at the Instituto Universitario de Estudios Musicales (IUDEM) and teaches at the Conservatorio Simón Bolívar.

== Works ==
- Laberinto sin salida for Piano (1974)
- El Zamural (1975)
- Nuestra Cultura Vegeta for audio tape recording (1976)
- Flash 5 (1977)
- Juego de manos es de villanos (1981)
- Hojas de Olvido for electronic instruments (1981)
- Orquestada Nº 3 for piano and eighteen Instruments (1983)
- Pobre música electrónica pobre (1983)
- A ver si nos entendemos for piano and electronic instruments (1983)
- Um-um-é-hum-ah for electronic instruments (1984)
- Un minuto de silencio por favor (o ni en sueños) for electronic instruments (1984)
- Glooskap y Lindú (1984)
- Dar for Flute, Violin, Cello, drums and piano (1985)
- Seis poemas de César Vallejo for Mezzo-soprano and piano (1985)
- Orquestada Nº 6: El fresco aroma de viejos placeres for Orchestra (1985)
- Orquestada Nº 7: La Gran Aldea for Orchestra and/or electronic instruments (1985)
- Suave, suave, fluye suave; fluye, fluye, suave fluye for piano four hands and/or electronic instruments(1986)
- ¡Que sí te lo digo! for two Piccolos (1986)
- Huellas de Voces Perdidas for synthesizer (1986)
- La Cacería del NHOC for electronic instruments (1986)
- Rayas de Tigre for vibraphon and concertino (1986)
- Amantes (y su epílogo Amigos) for cello and piano (1987)
- El Macromicrobio for doublebass and electronic instruments (1988)
- Típico Tópico Trópico Trío for Violin and Cello (1989)
- El Niño de la Mirada Clara, children opera (Libretto by the composer) (1989–1995)
- Tan claro como el agua (after a work by Mexican Choreographer Beatriz Madrid for three clarinets, accordion and drums (1990–91)
- Esencia en escena for piano (1991)
- Cinco canciones ¿ingenuas? (1995)
- Toccata for piano (1995)
- 3 Piezas para Liralata y sonidos electrónicos grabados (1996)
- Concertino Nº1 for concertino and string orchestra (1996)
- Cuarteto con piano Nº1 (1996–1997)
- Mojiganga Nº1 for Symphonic orchestra (1998)
- Sonrisa de Mujer concert for Harp and Symphonic orchestra (1998–1999)
- ¿¡Qué tal!? ¿cuál es cuál? for Flute and Harp (1999)
- Energías Liberadas (1999)
- Dos piezas para dos con bolsas (2000)
- Cuaderno Nº1 de Piezas para concertina inglesa tenor sola (2000–2005)
- Concertino Nº 2 for concertino and Orchestra (2002–2003)
- Cascadas de Risa Perlada for Flute and clarinet (2004)
- Manada for Marimba (2004)111
