= Milena Gimón =

Venezuelan sports journalist and footballer (born 1980)

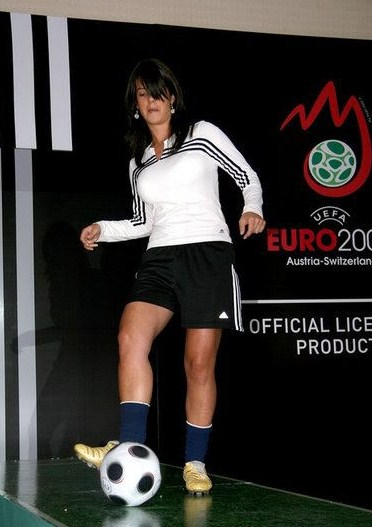
- Milena Gimón in 2006

Personal information
- Date of birth: 17 June 1980 (age 46)

Senior career*
Years	Team	Apps	(Gls)
1999 – ?	UCAB Spirit		

International career
2003	Venezuela	2	(0)
- * Club domestic league appearances and goals

Milena Gimón (born 17 June 1980) is a Venezuelan sports journalist and former footballer, who played for UCAB Spirit and the Venezuela women's national football team.

== Career ==
=== Football ===
Milena Gimón was born on 17 June 1980. Her father pushed her to be involved in baseball as a child, but she preferred football. She attended Los Campitos in Caracas, and studied Social Communication at Andrés Bello Catholic University. It was at University that she properly became involved in football, changing classes so that she could join the women's team there. This team became UCAB Spirit when the Venezuelan Football Federation organised the semi-professional Liga Amateur de Fútbol Femenino. She was one of the players that was provided with a salary by the team.

Gimón made her international debut for the Venezuela women's national football team on 9 April 2003 in the 2–0 defeat by Ecuador. She only made one further appearance for the national team, two days later in the 9–0 defeat by Colombia.

=== Journalism ===
Following her retirement from football, she became involved in television journalism. She has commentated and presented for DirecTV Sports in Latin America since 2006, despite having no prior television experience. She has covered several FIFA World Cups, and the 2012 Summer Olympics, which she said was like her "graduation".
