= José Jesús Villa Pelayo =

Venezuelan poet, essayist, lawyer and political analyst

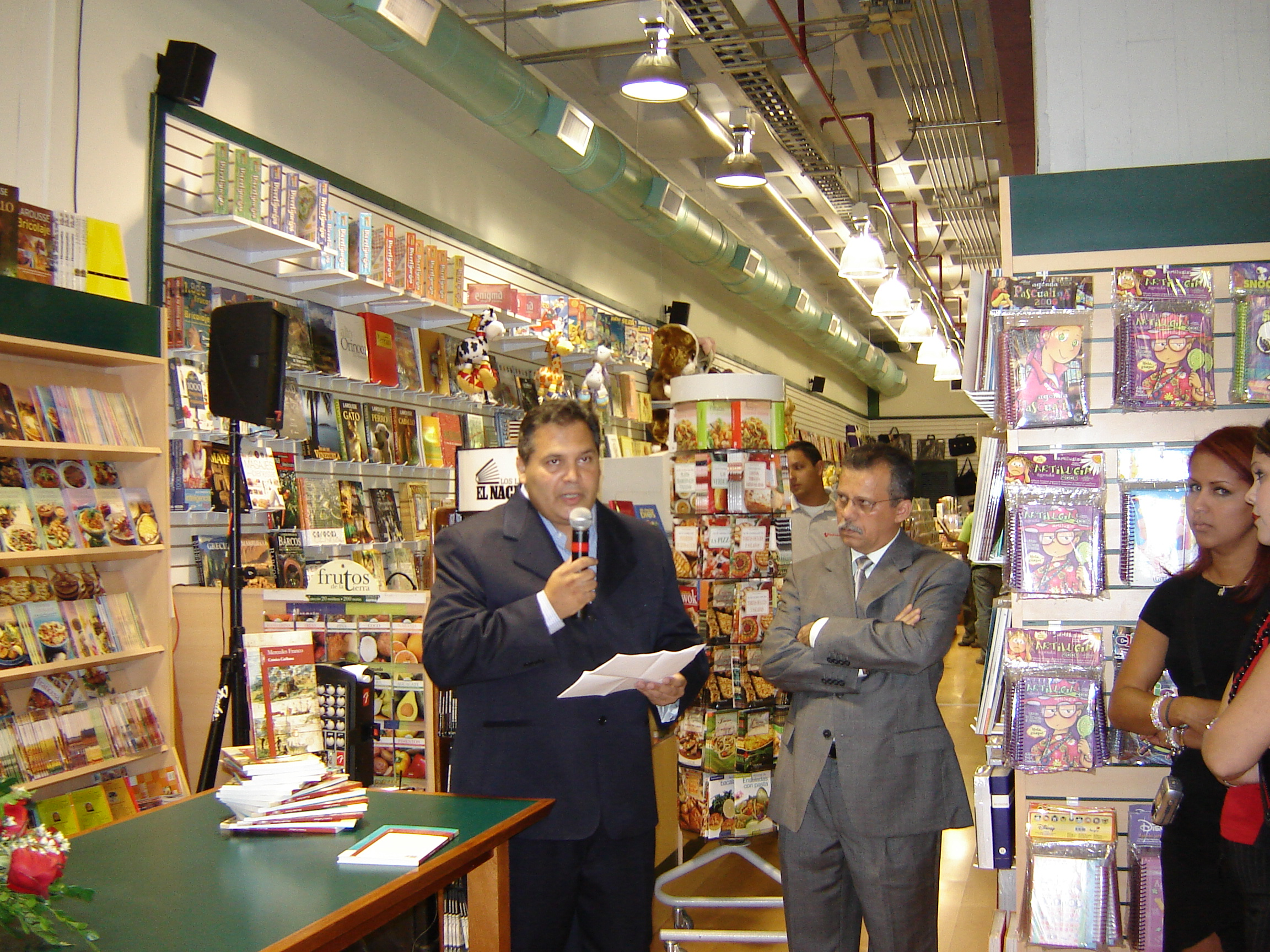
José Jesús Villa Pelayo is reading a text.

José Jesús Villa Pelayo (born November 6, 1962) is a Venezuelan poet, essayist, literary critic, geopolitical analyst, and lawyer. He is recognized by contemporary criticism as a key renovator of Venezuelan poetry and a central figure of the "Nueva Poesía" (New Poetry) movement. His literary proposal is built upon three main conceptual pillars: the restoration of the sacred, metaphysical, and symbolic traditions of poetry; the integration of high formal and verbal avant-garde experimentation; and the use of aesthetic bilingualism and hypertextuality as a postmodern method tied to dramatic characters and literary hoaxes (supercherías literarias).

== Biography and education ==
Born in Caracas, Villa Pelayo graduated in Letters from the Central University of Venezuela (UCV) in 1987. He studied under Cervantes Prize winner Rafael Cadenas. His thesis, the poetry collection Nueva York (1992), received an Honorable Mention from a jury including Cadenas. He also holds a law degree from Santa María University (1992).

His work has been analyzed as a key part of the literary generation of the 1990s in Venezuela.

== Poetics and style ==
His literary proposal distances itself from realism to focus on a symbolic and metaphysical lyricism. Critics such as Alexis Márquez Rodríguez and Gina Saraceni have highlighted his ability to restore the sacred character of the word through a "gnostic poetics."

A defining feature of his work is "aesthetic bilingualism"—the use of interlinear verses in Spanish-English or Spanish-Portuguese, as seen in Mariana de Coimbra (1999) and Maraclea de Seforis (2024). His style has also been described in terms of "exoticism and masking."

== International presence ==
In 1991, his work was included in the Italian anthology Altri Termini (Naples), alongside authors such as Octavio Paz, Ted Hughes, and Edoardo Sanguineti.

== Selected works ==
- Una hiedra negra para Sashne (1990)
- Nueva York (1992)
- Mariana de Coimbra (1999)
- Antología 1985-2009 (2010) - Preface by Mercedes Franco.
- Elegía para un mago de Venecia (2016) - Winner of the Stefania Mosca National Literature Prize.
- Maraclea de Seforis (2024).
