= Gualberto Ibarreto =

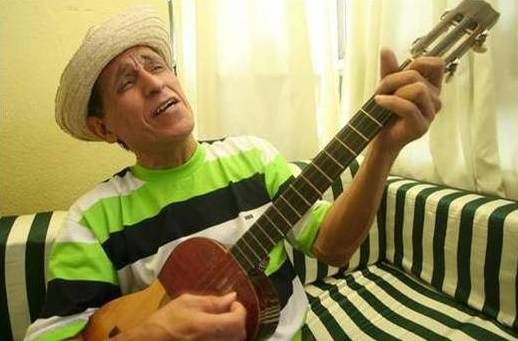

Background information
- Born: Gualberto José Ibarreto Barrios; July 12, 1947 (age 78); El Pilar, Sucre state, Venezuela
- Genres: Venezuelan folk music
- Occupation: Singer
- Years active: 1970–present

Gualberto José Ibarreto Barrios (born July 12, 1947 in El Pilar, Sucre state, Venezuela), is a venezuelan singer and musician. He has released 24 studio records.

== See also ==
- Venezuelan music
