= Music of Venezuela =

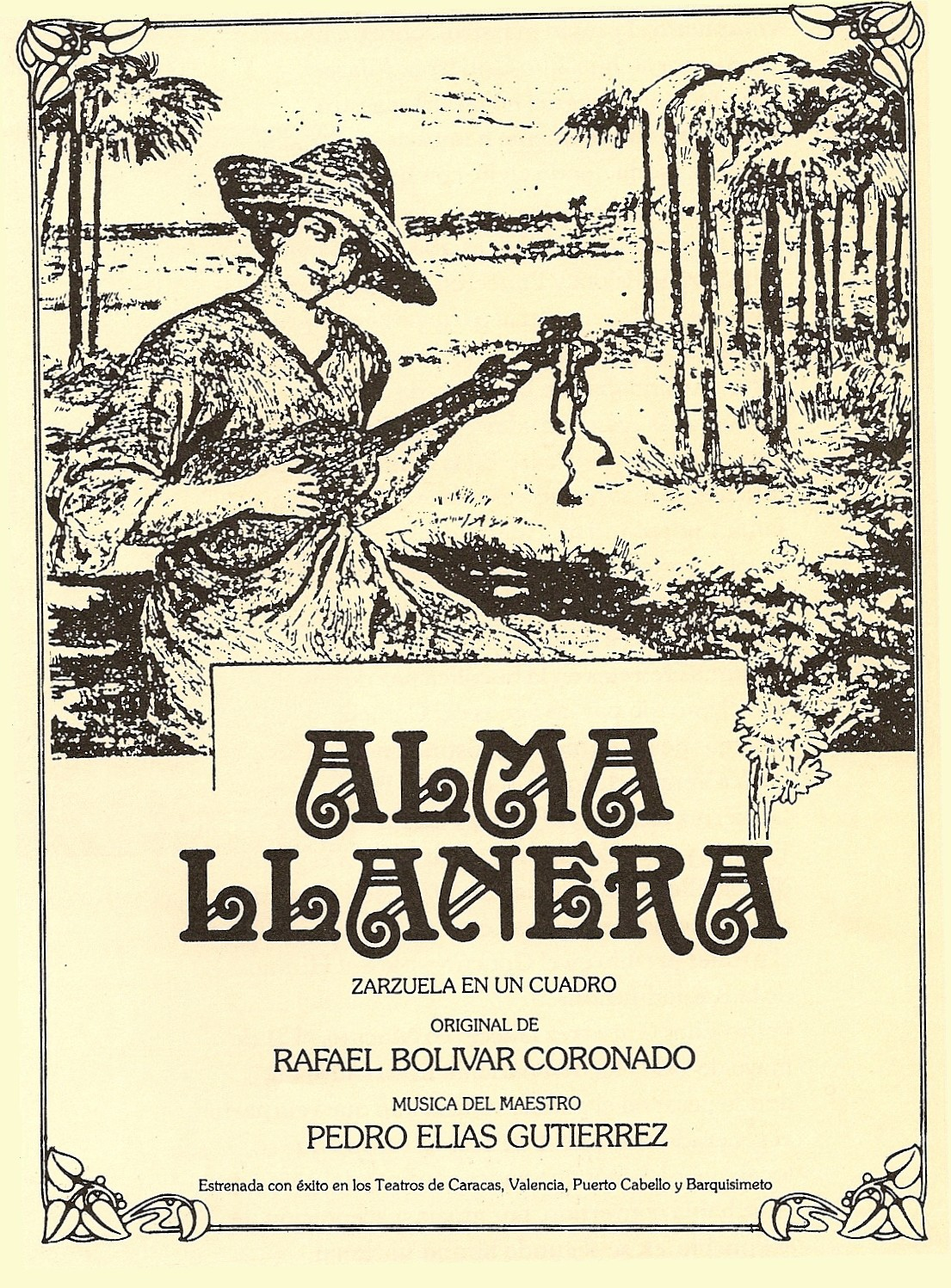
Cover of the first edition of Alma Llanera, unofficial second national anthem of Venezuela

Several styles of the traditional music of Venezuela, such as salsa and merengue, are common to its Caribbean neighbors. Perhaps the most typical Venezuelan music is joropo, a rural form which originated in the llanos, or plains.

== Genres ==
=== Joropo ===
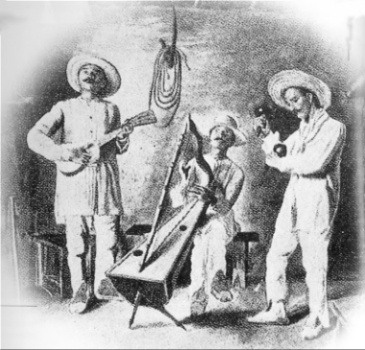
Venezuelan Joropo. Drawing by Eloy Palacios (1912)

Joropo was developed by creative artists such as Juan Vicente Torrealba, Ignacio Figueredo, Augusto Bracca, Genaro Prieto, Rafael Angel Aparicio, Eneas Perdomo and Angel Custodio Loyola, who helped to popularize the music throughout the country. Since then a slick, contemporary form of pop-llanera has developed which has earned the scorn of some purists who perceive it as stale and watered-down. Some singers, such as Isabelita Aparicio, Adilia Castillo, Lorenzo Herrera, Simon Diaz, Mario Suarez, Edith Salcedo, Fernando Tovar, Miguelito Rios, Magdalena Sanchez, Rafael Montaño, Reyna Lucero, Vidal Colmenares, Armando Martinez, Raquel Castaños, Scarlett Linares, Cristina Maica, Luicel Mora, Emily Galaviz, José Catire Carpio, Cristobal Jimenez, Juan de los Santos Contreras (El Carrao de Palmarito), Rafael Montaño, and Reynaldo Armas have maintained a huge following over the years. In a similar vein, there is also neo-folklore, which takes traditional music and arranges it in an electronic style.

In 2025, UNESCO inscribed Venezuelan joropo on the Representative List of the Intangible Cultural Heritage of Humanity.

=== Folk ===
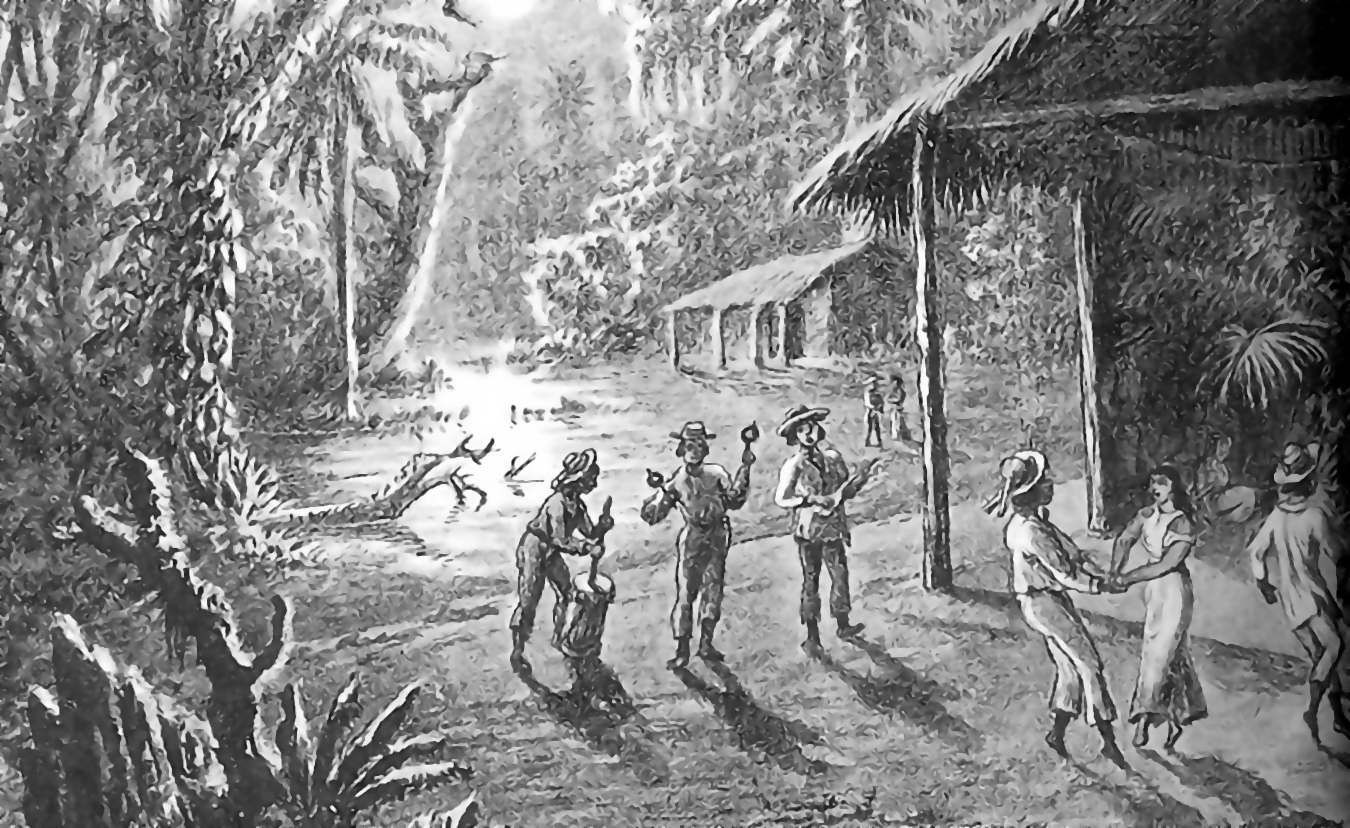
Velorio de Cruz de Mayo, drawing by Anton Goering (1892)

Another very popular music in Venezuela is the Gaita Zuliana. This genre originated from the region of Zulia State and is very popular during the Christmas season. The gaita united to the Aguinaldo, conforms the national representation of the Venezuelan Christmas. In the Venezuelan Andes, the Venezuelan bambuco is a local variation of the bambuco. Other forms include polo coriano and the Venezuelan waltz.

The galerón is sung in the Center-Western region of Venezuela, more specifically in Lara State. It is part of The Tamunangue, a ritual religious celebration honoring Saint Anthony of Padua. It is one of the Sones de Negros suite that merges religious devotion with African-influenced, theatrical dance, featuring seven distinct, choreographed dances preceded by a Salve, often listed as La Bella. which includes, La Juruminga, El Poco a Poco, El Yiyivamos, La Perrendenga, El Galerón, y El Seis Figureao. It is played with cuatro, cinco y medio, also known as tiple venezolano, and guitar and sung in two voices. Carota, Ñema y Tajá, orchestra Mavare are the best interpreters of galeron larense along with the Quinteto Contrapunto, founded by Rafael Suárez and Aida Navarro, a celebrated Venezuelan vocal quintet which reached nationwide and international celebrity in the early 1960s, and was very active for about a decade.

Other forms of Venezuelan folk music are tensively recorded and researched due to the work of Caracas-based Fundación Bigott. African-derived percussion (including multiple rhythms, such as sangueo, fulia, parranda and tamborera) is perhaps the best documented musical form. Fundacion Bigott has also produced groups such Un Solo Pueblo, Huracán de Fuego, Tambor Urbano, and Grupo Madera. These more experimental fusion artists combine rumba, Latin jazz, joropo, salsa, Venezuelan traditional chants and other forms of Latin American music.

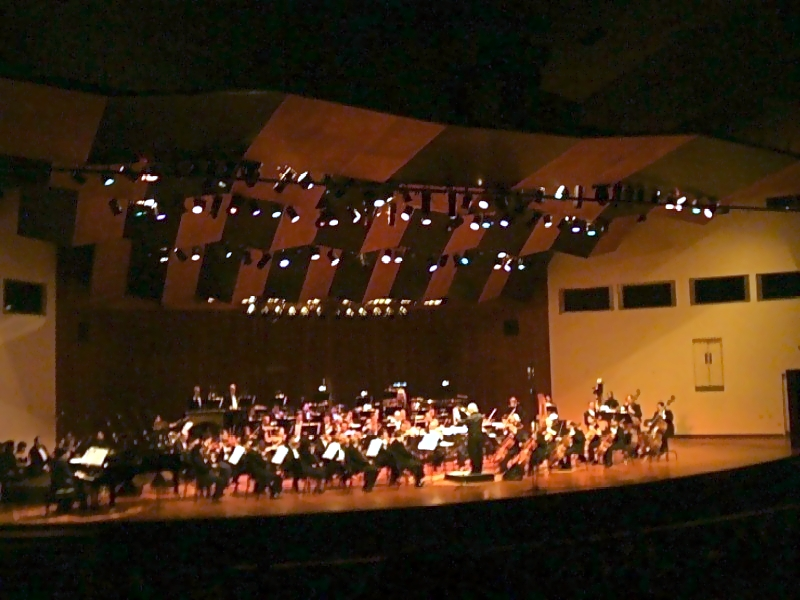
Aldemaro Romero directing the Municipal Symphony Orchestra of Caracas, at the celebration of the 50th anniversary of Dinner in Caracas

Then there is also the genre commonly known as "Onda Nueva" (New Wave), which is a combination of joropo and jazz music, with influences from the Brazilian Bossa Nova. The genre was introduced by Aldemaro Romero with a special contribution by famed drummer and timpanist Frank Hernandez, nicknamed "El Pavo" (The Turkey (Venezuelan slang for “the youth”)) by employing a very peculiar drum beat. The term was coined by jazz analyst Jacques Braunstein after having been shown a copy of Romero's earliest composition called "Araguita", (originally to be used as jingle material), which Braunstein described as "something of a new wave". Onda Nueva music was heralded as the Venezuelan Bossa Nova with a very particular seal.

=== Caribbean ===
In the Eastern region, the malagueña, polo, punto and galerón accompanies the velorios de cruz de mayo, (religious tradition, that is celebrated on 3 May in honor to the Christian cross). The Eastern galerón is sung in improvised ten-line stanzas. Generally, it is accompanied by mandolin, cuatro, and guitar. It is normally played with improvised lyrics honoring the Christian Cross. It is related to the guajiro (Cuba), torbellino (Colombia), and trova (Puerto Rico).

Venezuelan calypso music (including Calypso de El Callao), imported from Trinidad in the 1880s by immigrants arriving during a gold rush, has its own distinctive rhythms and lyrical style.

In Caracas, the term merengue rucaneao designated a way of dancing with couples holding and often featuring exaggerated hip movements (which added to the craze and subsequent controversy). Dances were paid affairs, with popular prices being “a locha” (12 1/2 cents) or “a medio” (25 cents) in dance halls known then as mabiles. Live accompaniment consisted of four solo instruments: trumpet, trombone, saxophone and clarinet and rhythm instruments such as the cuatro, bass and percussion (which, depending on the size of the ensemble, could be as simple as a scraper, or incorporate maracas and even a snare drum). Travelling groups known as cañoneros walked around the neighborhoods staging impromptu performances for tips. The name "cañoneros" comes from their marketing approach, which included firing a carbide charge from a blank cannon made of a thick, hollowed-out bamboo cane.

Dominican merengue, Cuban and Colombian Latin pop acts such as Billo's Caracas Boys, the Porfi Jiménez Orchestra, Los Blanco, Leonard Melody, Aldemaro Romero, Luis Alfonzo Larrain, Chucho Sanoja y su Orquesta, Hermanos Belisario Orchestra, Los Peniques, Super Combo Los Tropicales, and Los Melódicos.

Another imported genre is Cuban-American salsa, which has produced several domestic superstars, including Oscar D'Leon.

== Contemporary music ==
=== Venezuelan salsa ===
Salsa music arrived in Venezuela in the latter half of the 20th century, primarily influenced by the vibrant salsa scenes of Cuba and Puerto Rico. As the genre spread across Latin America, Venezuelan musicians embraced and adapted it, developing a distinct local sound. By the late 1970s, Venezuela had become not just a hub for salsa consumption but also a key center for its production, with new groups emerging that reflected the country's unique cultural and musical identity.

One of the pioneering salsa groups in Venezuela was Dimensión Latina, founded in 1973. Known for their tight brass arrangements and infectious rhythms, the band played a crucial role in popularizing salsa within the country. Their collaboration with renowned vocalist Oscar D'León, who has been credited with bringing salsa to "all corners of the world," cemented Venezuela's place in the international salsa scene. In 1980, he released Llorarás, a salsa classic that became a defining song of his career and Venezuelan salsa.

By the 1990s, salsa in Venezuela continued to evolve, incorporating contemporary influences. Salserín, formed in the early part of the decade, stood out as one of the few successful boy bands in the genre. Their early success was driven by songs like De Sol a Sol. Around the same time, Adolescentes Orquesta emerged as another key group in the Venezuelan salsa scene, gaining popularity with romantic salsa hits. Both of these groups’ success helped keep salsa music relevant among younger generations, bridging the gap between traditional salsa and newer influences.

This period also set the stage for Servando & Florentino’s rise as a duo, with the brothers later becoming a prominent act, further expanding the reach of Venezuelan salsa. They achieved widespread success with salsa hits such as Una Fan Enamorada, Aliviame, and Estás Hecha Para Mí, the latter two written by Ricardo Montaner. Beyond salsa, they explored genres like pop and rock, releasing hits like Si Yo Fuera Tú and Una Canción Que Te Enamore, which broadened their appeal across Latin America.

=== Pop and rock ===
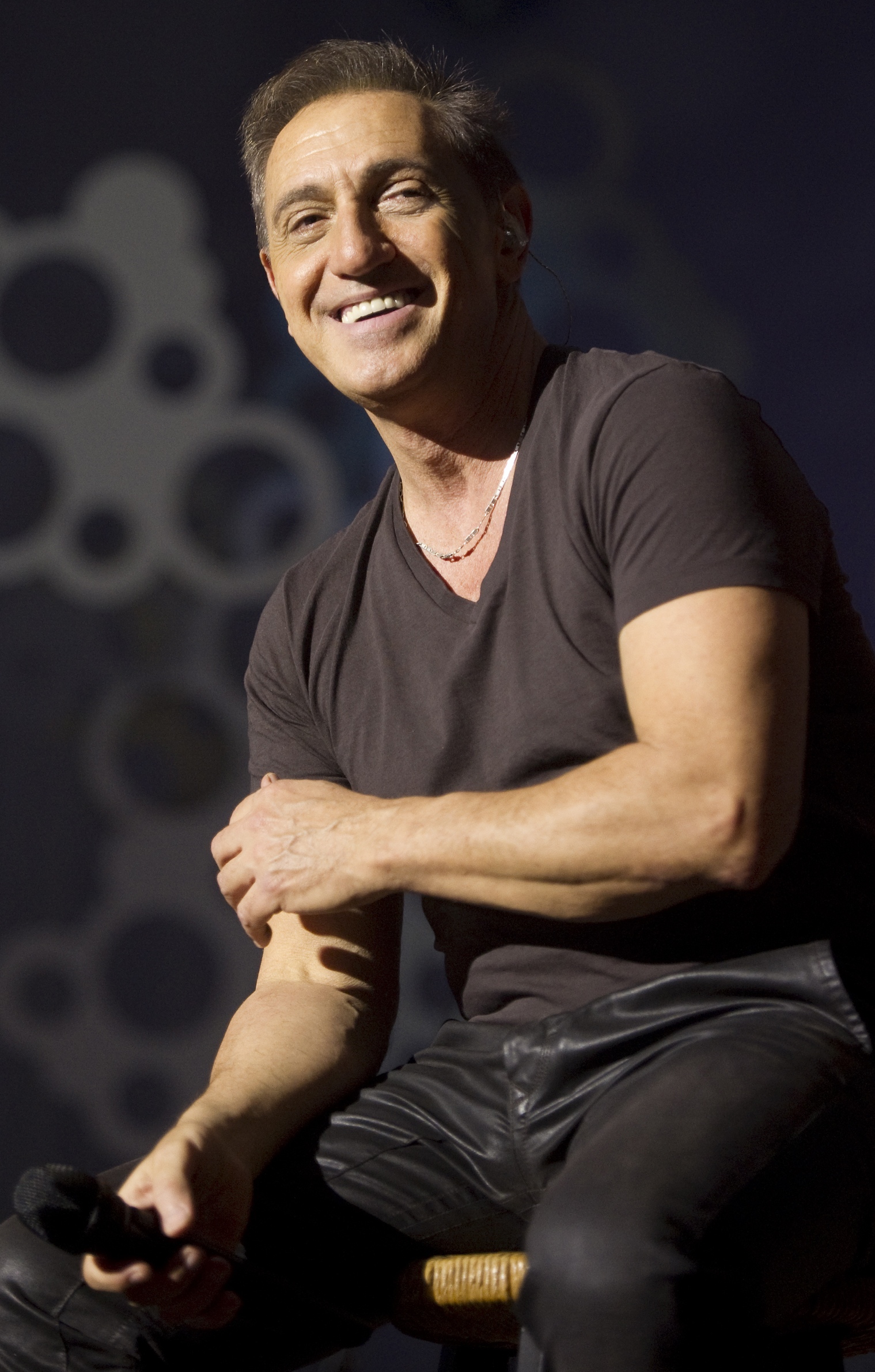
Franco De Vita during his live performance, En Primera Fila, 2011

Franco De Vita emerged in the 1980s as one of Venezuela's most influential artists, blending melodic pop with rock elements. He released his self-titled debut album Franco De Vita in 1984, followed by Fantasía (1986), Al Norte del Sur (1988), and Extranjero (1990). Throughout this period, he gained widespread recognition with hits such as Un Buen Perdedor, Te Amo, and Louis, which became staples across Latin America. His success extended beyond Venezuela, reaching major markets like Mexico, Colombia, and Argentina, as well as Spain and Italy.

In the late 1990s and early 2000s, De Vita continued to release commercially successful albums, including Nada Es Igual (1999) and Stop (2004). These albums produced chart-topping singles such as Si Tú No Estás, Tú de Qué Vas, and Si La Ves, further cementing his status as a leading figure in Latin pop. His ability to craft heartfelt lyrics and memorable melodies allowed him to maintain a strong presence in Latin America for decades.

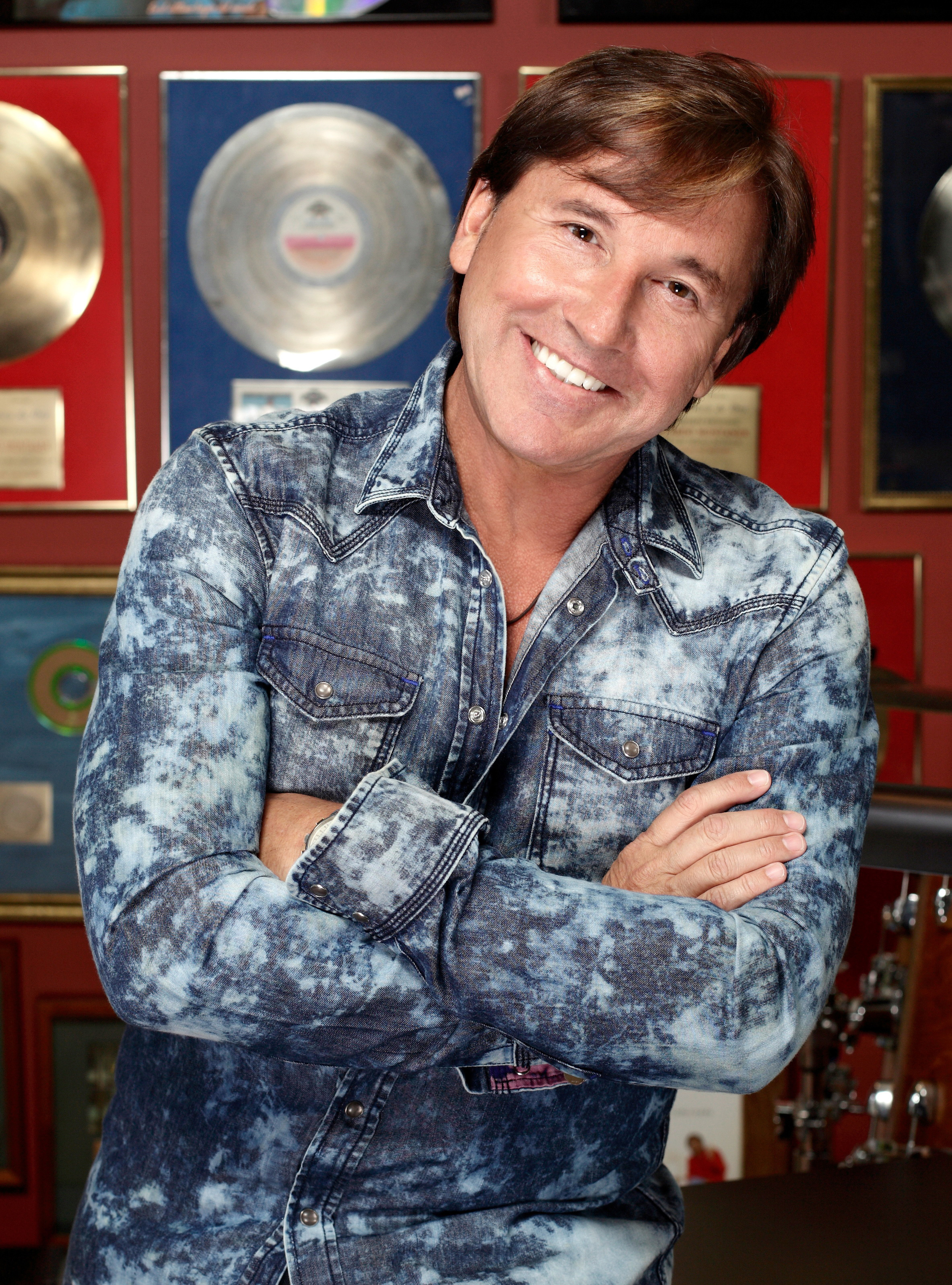
Ricardo Montaner in Miami, Florida, photographed by Kike San Martín, 2010

Ricardo Montaner, who grew up in Maracaibo, emerged in the 1980s as another one of Venezuela's most successful artists, blending pop and ballad influences to create a signature romantic style. He released his debut album Ricardo Montaner (1986), followed by Ricardo Montaner 2 (1988), Un Toque de Misterio (1989), En el Último Lugar del Mundo (1991), and Los Hijos del Sol (1992), among others. During this period, he gained widespread recognition with hits such as Tan Enamorados, Me Va a Extrañar, La Cima del Cielo, Ojos Negros, Será, and Déjame Llorar.

In the late 1990s, Montaner reimagined many of his greatest hits with orchestral arrangements on Con la London Metropolitan Orchestra (1999), which included the widely popular El Poder de Tu Amor. Moving into the 2000s and beyond, he continued to solidify his legacy with new releases and consistent chart success, such as Bésame and Resumiendo. As one of Venezuela's best-selling artists, Montaner's influence extends far beyond his home country, making a significant impact in major Latin American markets such as Mexico, Colombia, Argentina, Peru, and the Dominican Republic, as well as in Spain. His ability to adapt his style while maintaining his signature sound has helped him sustain a multi-decade career, securing his place as one of Latin pop's most enduring figures.

José Luis Rodríguez has been a defining figure in Venezuelan music, influencing the region's music scene for decades. Widely Known as "El Puma," he has gained recognition for hits, such as Dueño de Nada, Culpable Soy Yo, and Agárrense de las Manos.

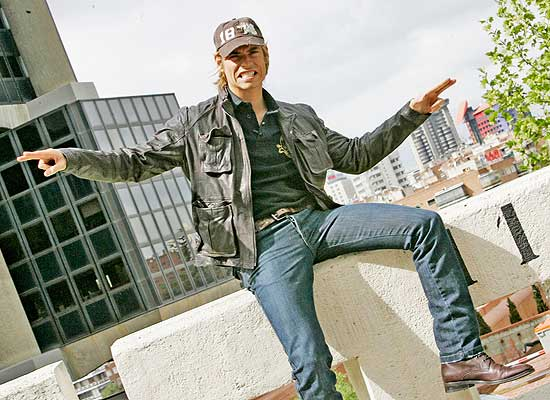
Carlos Baute, photographed for 20 minutos, 2009

Carlos Baute gained widespread recognition with his hit song Colgando en Tus Manos (2008), a duet with Spanish singer Marta Sánchez. The song became an international success, topping the charts in multiple countries across Latin America and Spain. As of February 2024, its music video has reached nearly 900 million views on YouTube.

Other influential Pop artists include Yordano, Guillermo Dávila, Kiara, Karina, and Ilan Chester have gained popularity across Latin American countries as well.

Several Venezuelan bands have played a significant role in shaping the country's diverse musical scene, with some gaining international recognition. Los Amigos Invisibles, known for their acid jazz style, and Caramelos de Cianuro, a punk and alternative rock group, have enjoyed success abroad. Other influential groups such as Voz Veis, Desorden Público, and Zapato 3 have made important contributions to Venezuela's music culture.

=== Electronic music ===
In the late 1960s and early 1970s a few Venezuelan artists began experimenting with sounds, using emerging electronic equipment that was being produced. Artists like Vytas Brenner and Grupo C.I.M. used Moog style synthesizers and effects to embrace the shift in new sounds. Alfredo del Mónaco, who founded the Venezuelan branch of ISCM, is considered the pioneer in electronic music in Venezuela having released Estudio electrónico I para cinta in 1968. Jose Enrique Sarabia also known as "Chelique," who was already internationally known for producing songs since the late 50s like "Ansiedad," helped by other gifted musicians, recorded and released a record in 1971 through a private press titled: 4 Fases del Cuatro - Música Venezolana desarrollada Electrónicamente por Chelique Sarabia (4 Phases of Four - Venezuelan Music Electronically Developed by Chelique Sarabia). In 1973, when exclusivity of the private contract ended, Chelique commercially released the record under a different title: Revolución "Electrónica" en Música Venezolana (Electronic Revolution in Venezuelan Music). Revolución "Electrónica" en Música Venezolana is notable for being one of the earliest electronic records in Venezuela and is considered a trailblazing album for electronic music in Latin America.

In the late 1990s a very strong electronic music movement spread through the country. Several big multimedia festivals took place, such as "Caracas No Duerme," "AX," "Petaquire," and "Mare Nostrum." These events combined music with the video and performance art of Venezuelan artists such as Luis Poleo, Frank Wow, and Sony. The main bands/DJ's of this era are Ojo Fatuo, DJ Oddo and DJ Wyz.

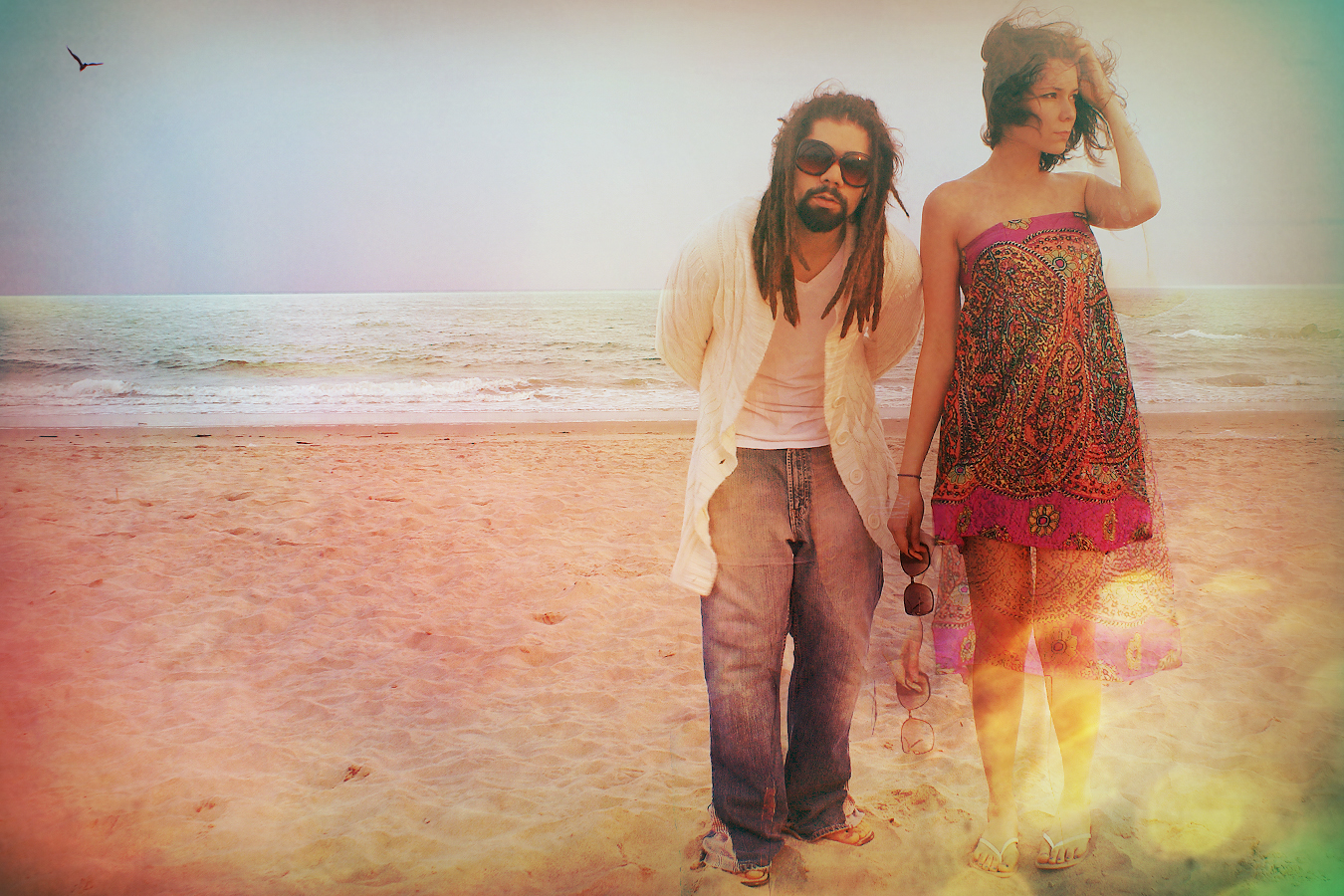
Patafunk "Playa" 2011

From 2000 until present, a lot of Venezuelan artists have made a strong movement into different underground music styles. The most significant ones are: Arca (experimental/industrial) Masseratti 2lts (downtempo), La Vida Boheme (post-punk), Lmca (Electronic/Synthpop/post-punk/experimental), Viniloversus (indie rock), KP-9000 (trip hop), Cardopusher (breakcore), Nuuro (IDM), Patafunk (Tropical/funk), FamasLoop (trip hop/electronica), Todosantos (nu rave/indietronica), Jimmy Flamante (breakbeat), Las Americas (shoegazing), Dondi (drum and bass/downtempo), Retrovértigo (post-rock), Lis (instrumental rock), Tercer Cuarto (alternative metal), Panasuyo (neo-folklore), Pacheko (dubstep), Dame Pa' Matala (reggaeton/hip hop) and Los Javelin (surf rock/rockabilly) AC/Boy (Techno)

=== Classical music ===
Venezuela has also produced classical composers such as: Reynaldo Hahn, Teresa Carreño (who was also a world-renowned pianist), Antonio Lauro, Víctor Varela, Antonio Estevez, Evencio Castellanos, Modesta Bor, Prudencio Esaa, Moisés Moleiro, Sylvia Constantinidis, Gustavo Dudamel, Ilyich Rivas, Alfredo Rugeles and Eduardo Marturet (who are primarily international conductors), Federico Ruiz (who also works with other genres) and Vicente Emilio Sojo (known for his contributions to Venezuelan musicology and music education). Roberto Ruscitti followed in their footsteps.

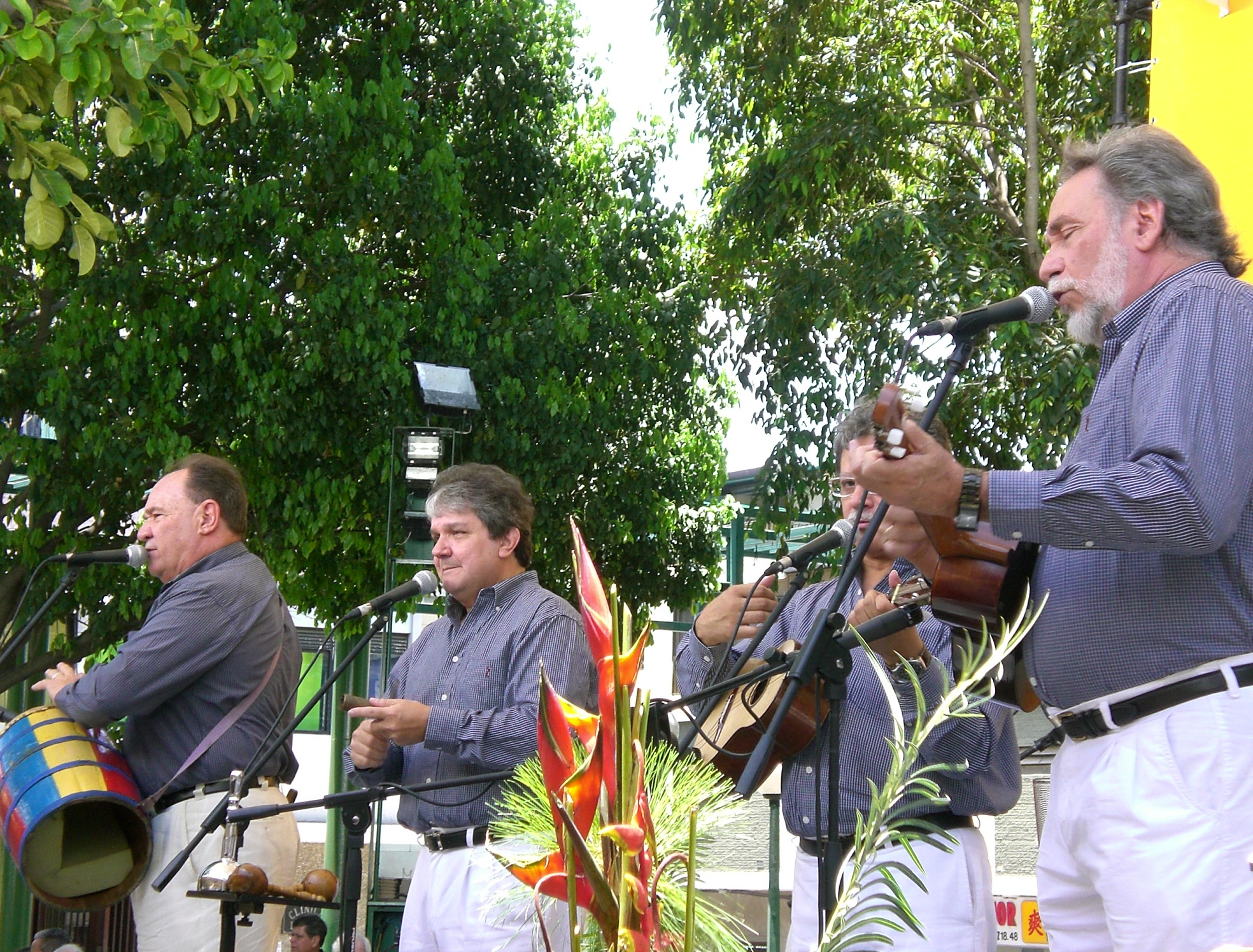
Serenata Guayanesa

Venezuela also houses a national network of public conservatories and music schools; there are also private music schools and institutions. Institutes of higher learning that specialize in music or have a music department include Universidad de las Artes, whose music department is the former Instituto Universitario de Estudios Musicales; Universidad Central de Venezuela, which gives diplomas in music performance and postgraduate degrees in musicology, including doctorates; Universidad Simón Bolívar, whose music department awards Master of Music degrees in several areas including composition, conducting, and music education; and Universidad de los Andes. Prominent composers and musicians who have taught, founded, or studied in these institutions include Alberto Grau, Isabel Aretz, María Guinand (who was one of the founders of the Master of Music program of Universidad Simón Bolívar), Diana Arismendi, Ricardo Teruel, Inocente Carreño, Adina Izarra, Marianela Arocha, Maurice Hasson, Pedro Eustache, David Ascanio, Josefina Benedetti, Alfredo del Monaco, Alfredo Rugeles, Humberto Bruni Lamanna, Abraham Abreu, Aldo Abreu, Aquiles Baez, Pablo Gil, Carlos Duarte and Sylvia Constantinidis.

Venezuela also has El Sistema, a publicly financed voluntary sector music education program for impoversished children, founded by José Antonio Abreu in 1975. Prominent musicians who have graduated from El Sistema include Gustavo Dudamel, director of Los Angeles Philharmonic, Rodolfo Saglimbeni, Principal Conductor of the National Symphony Orchestra of Chile, José Luis Gomez, director of the Tucson Symphony Orchestra, Rafael Payare, director of the San Diego Symphony, Glenn Garrido, director of the Houston Latin American Philharmonic, Diego Matheuz, Ilych Rivas, Domingo Hindoyan, and double bassist Edicson Ruiz, who, at age 17, became the youngest member of the Berlin Philharmonic Orchestra. The Simón Bolívar Symphony Orchestra runs under the auspices of El Sistema. Other Venezuelan symphony orchestras include the Venezuela Symphony Orchestra, Maracaibo Symphony Orchestra, Municipal Symphony Orchestra and Mérida State Symphony Orchestra.

== Composers ==
Juana Maria de la Concepcion, commonly referred to as Conny Méndez, born 11 April 1898 in Caracas, was a composer, singer, writer, caricaturist and actress who produced more than 40 compositions, such as: Yo soy venezolana, Chucho y Ceferina, La Negrita Marisol, Venezuela Habla Cantando, and many others.

=== Venezuelan waltz ===
Although the waltz is a rhythm originating from the great European salons of the 17th and 19th centuries, a new form of waltz emerged during the late eighteenth century in Venezuela, Ecuador and Colombia. Venezuelan waltz flourished in Venezuela from the 18th century into the early 20th century. Notable composers included Francisco de Paula Aguirre and Laudelino Mejías.

Antonio Lauro composed a large body of classical guitar works, adapting traditional Venezuelan waltz and folk songs for the instrument.

=== Venezuelan merengue ===
Despite, or perhaps because its popular origins, Merengue was embraced wholeheartedly by the vast majority of Venezuela's Nationalistic classical composers. Pianist-composer Teresa Carreño wrote several merengues, and incorporated the form as an interlude in some of her pieces (for example, in her piece entitled Un Bal en Rêve). Pianist-composer Moisés Moleiro also wrote and performed merengues in his classical repertoire, as did Evencio Castellanos. Guitarist-composer Antonio Lauro wrote what is believed to be the first piece in the form for solo classical guitar, simply entitled Merengue (1945). Rodrigo Riera composed his first merengue for solo guitar, entitled Merengue Venezolano in the 1950s. Later, he wrote many other merengues. Singer Jesús Sevillano included several merengues in his repertoire, during the height of his singing career. Other composers include Rafael Suarez, Gilberto Rebolledo, Luis Laguna, and Pablo Camacaro.

=== Modern trends ===
Rubén Cedeño, composer of folk and children's music of Venezuela, appears in the Venezuelan music encyclopedia. He is a singer, composer, investigator, painter and writer. His most recognized work is "The Aguinaldo Que Navidad" part of the Venezuelan Christmas repertoire interpreted by the mezzo-soprano Morella Muñoz.

Gustavo Matamoros is a Venezuelan composer dedicated to the experimentation with sound and its relationship with the human mind and culture. He has worked mainly with contemporary techniques such as electroacoustics, mixed media, performance, installations, radiophony and multimedia spectacles.

== Notable musicians and groups ==
Other Venezuelan performers of note include Jorge Aguilar, Linda Briceño, Chino y Nacho, Franco de Vita, Alirio Diaz, Hernán Gamboa, Gualberto Ibarreto, Enrique Hidalgo, Rudy Regalado, Jesus Sanoja, Otmaro Ruiz, Vytas Brenner, Yordano, Juan Carlos Salazar, Huáscar Barradas, Billo Frómeta, Gerry Weil, Soledad Bravo, Marlene, María Teresa Chacín, Luis Mariano Rivera, Maurice Hasson, Luis Laguna, Arca, Graciela, Cecilia Todd, Lilia Vera, Alí Primera, José Luis Rodríguez, Graciela Naranjo, Mario Carniello, Frank Quintero, Henry Martínez, Pedro Eustache and Alberto Naranjo, as well as the groups Serenata Guayanesa, Dimensión Latina, Los Cuñaos, Los Cañoneros, Guaco, Mango, Grupo Madera, Ensamble Gurrufio, Lloviznando Cantos, Los Chamos and El Trabuco Venezolano, among others.

== See also ==
- Opera in Venezuela
- Nueva canción
- Alí Primera

== Citations ==
- Brill, Mark. Music of Latin America and the Caribbean, 2nd Edition, 2018. Taylor & Francis ISBN 1138053562
- Peñín, José y Walter Guido. Enciclopedia de la Música en Venezuela, Tomo I. Caracas. Fundación Bigott. ISBN 980-642-803-X
- Rosenberg, Dan and Phil Sweeney. Salsa con Gasolina. 2000. In Broughton, Simon and Ellingham, Mark with McConnachie, James and Duane, Orla (Ed.), World Music, Vol. 2: Latin & North America, Caribbean, India, Asia and Pacific, pp 624–630. Rough Guides Ltd, Penguin Books. ISBN 1-85828-636-0
