= Flor Roffé de Estévez =

Venezuelan composer and music educator (1921–2004)

- Born: 24 October 1921; Caracas, Venezuela
- Died: 21 October 2004 (aged 82); Caracas, Venezuela
- Education: José Ángel Lamas School of Music; University of Columbia; Juilliard School of Music
- Occupations: Composer; writer; professor
- Years active: 1950s–1980s

Flor Roffé de Estévez (24 October 1921, Caracas – 21 October 2004, Caracas) was a composer, writer and professor of Venezuelan music. She came from a Jewish family who migrated to Venezuela at the beginning of the 20th century.

== Biography ==
In 1937, Roffé learned to teach music at the José Ángel Lamas School of Music, studying piano from Moisés Moleiro, music theory from Eduardo Square, harmony from Antonio Estévez and music history from Juan Bautista Square. In 1944, she studied music pedagogy at the New York Teacher's College of the University of Columbia, at the Juilliard School of Music in 1945, and finally, at the New York Dalcroze School.

She taught Dalcroze eurhythmics (developed by Émile Jaques-Dalcroze) at the Normal School Gran Colombia and the High School of Music (now called the School of Music Juan Manuel Olivares). In 1958, she developed, on behalf of the Ministry of Education, seminars and workshops on the implementation of the music education program of the Ministry. From 1959 to 1963, she acted as National Minister of Education Supervisor.

After a stay of several years in Paris, she founded in 1972, with the support of the National Council of Culture (CONAC), the Experimental School of Music Pedagogy, which she led for fifteen years. In 1988, she was professor of music education at the Central University of Venezuela.

In addition to numerous publications on music education, Roffé wrote a monograph on Vicente Emilio Sojo, as well as a series of editions with Venezuelan songs for various groups.

== Selected publications ==
- The Boy and the Music. Caracas, 1995.
- The Birthday of the Gallinita. First collection dimension: red Series. Illustrated by Laura Liberatore. 2nd edition of Mountain Ávila Latin American Editors CA, 14 pp. 1992. ISBN 9800105565, ISBN 9789800105566.
- Vicente Emilio Sojo and His Cats. Caracas, 1988.
- Vicente Emilio and His Cats: A Tale That Is Not a Tale. Collection Guarimba. With Cristina Keller. Editor Alfadil, 29 pp. 1987. ISBN 9806005201, ISBN 9789806005204.
- Fascicle of Exercise of Harmony
- You, I and the Music

== Compositions ==
- 1960: Cycle of Songs for Chorus and Piano
- 1976: 22 Childish Songs Venezuelan
- 1978: An Onion in the Pot (44 pp.)
- 1978: 10 Venezuelan Songs to Four Hands
- 1978: 15 Venezuelan Songs Even More Easy
