= Evencio Castellanos =

Venezuelan pianist, composer and director of choirs and orchestra (1915–1984)

Background information
- Born: May 3, 1915; Cúa, Miranda state, Venezuela
- Died: March 16, 1984 (aged 68) Caracas, Federal District, Venezuela
- Genres: Classical music, Venezuelan popular music
- Occupations: musician, pianist, composer, director
- Instrument: Piano

Evencio Castellanos Yumar (May 3, 1915 – March 16, 1984), was a Venezuelan pianist and classical musician. He was a talented pianist, composer and director of choirs and orchestra.

== Biography ==
His parents were Pablo Castellanos Almenar and Matilde Yumar. His musical initiation came from the hand of his father, who was an organist and chapel master. In 1938 he entered the Escuela Superior de Música de Caracas, where he studied singing with Antonio Pardo Soublette, cello with Carlos Áñez, history of music with Juan Bautista Plaza, and harmony and composition with Vicente Emilio Sojo. On July 4, 1944 he graduated as a master composer, and as such he was part of the first generation of composers who graduated from Professor Sojo's composition chair, characterized in his creations towards the Latin American nationalist tendency. Among these stand out along with Castellanos: Antonio Estévez, Ángel Sauce, Antonio Lauro, Blanca Estrella, José Clemente Laya, Raimundo Pereira, Modesta Bor and Inocente Carreño, among others and who would become the most relevant Venezuelan composers of the 20th century

In 1946 he directed the University Choir of the Central University of Venezuela (UNESCO World Heritage Site), for which he composed the University Anthem. Between August 1947 and September 1949 he lived in New York where he undertook advanced piano studies with Carlos Buhler. Upon his return to Venezuela, Evencio Castellanos embarked on a dynamic and active musical life in Caracas. In the Cathedral of Caracas he became organist and chapel master and joined the choir of the cathedral. Also, during that time, he was a member of the Lamas Choir and for fifteen years, Interpreter (Principal Pianist) of the Venezuela Symphony, an orchestra that he also conducted on multiple occasions. Parallel to his life as a musician, he has been a teacher in Caracas Superior School of Music as piano assistant (1938–1947), piano teacher, (1945–1947); organ and harpsichord teacher (1946–1972); professor of musical composition (1957–1964) and director of the school (1965–1972).

He was vice President of the Board of Directors of the Venezuelan Symphony Orchestra (1950–1951 and 1959), a member of the Superior Council Board of the same; president of the Venezuelan Association of Authors and Composers (ASOVAC, 1958–1959); director-founder of the Collegium Musicum of Caracas; director of the Student Orchestra of the Central University of Venezuela (1969) and director of the Experimental Orchestra of the Venezuelan Symphony, which he conducted in its inaugural concert on May 15, 1970. From 1979 to 1984 he served as Musical Advisor to the Latin American Institute for Research and Musical Studies Vicente Emilio Sojo.

Throughout his musical career, Evencio Castellanos obtained various awards and recognitions such as most important venezuelan decorations, the special award from the Ateneo de Caracas corresponding to the Teresa Carreño contest (1952) for his "Tribute to Teresa Carreño", the National Music Award (1954) for his symphonic composition "Santa Cruz de Pacairigua", the National Music Award (1962) for his masterpiece "El Tirano Aguirre" and the National Award for Artistic Career in 1979.

Castellanos’s compositional style can perhaps best be divided into works that are emblematic of the nationalistic influences set forth by Sojo, on the one hand, and on the other, sacred compositions influenced by his spiritual upbringing. His major orchestral works are permeated with a nationalistic aesthetic and are infused with folkloric elements, as are most of his instrumental and chamber works. His various sacred choral and organ compositions are more representative of his religious roots.

As a pianist he imposed a brilliant style that was expressed not only in more than 40 years of concerts but also in his compilations and harmonizations of the Venezuelan dances and waltzes of the nineteenth-century and the recording an important number of albums. He also performed as accompanying pianist with world-class musicians such as Mstislav Rostropovich, Henryk Szering, Maurice Hasson, Adolfo Odnoposoff, Florian Ebersberg, among others. As a performer, he also excelled as an organist, ending his career with two organ concerts at the cathedrals of Notre-Dame de Paris and Chartres Cathedral in France, in 1975

His orchestral works have been performed and recorded in countless countries around the world such as Venezuela, Brazil, Uruguay, Argentina, Mexico, United States, Spain, France, Germany, Austria, Holland, Poland, China, Korea or Japan, among others.

His brother, Gonzalo Castellanos Yumar (1926-2020), was a notable organist, composer and former chief conductor of the Venezuela Symphony Orchestra (1966–1978).

== Discography ==
- Nine Sephardic Songs (19??)
- Venezuelan Songs of the XIX Century (19??)
- Great Ballroom Waltzes (1964)
- Venezuelan Dances of the XIX Century (19??)
- Old Waltzes from Venezuela (1957)
- Venezuelan Ballroom Waltzes Vol. 1 (1997)
- Dances and Waltzes of Venezuela Vol. 2 (1997)
- Santa Cruz de Pacairigua / The river of the seven stars / Avileña Suite (Venezuela Symphony Orchestra, J. Wagner) Label: Naxos (2010)
- Deutsche Gramophon / Fiesta / Simon Bolívar Youth Orchestra of Venezuela / Conductor: Gustavo Dudamel

== See also ==
- Venezuelan music
