= Augusto Bracca =

Venezuelan folk musician

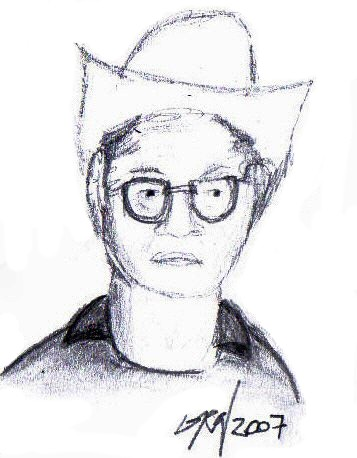
- Born: 23 April 1918; Trinidad de Orichuna, Apure
- Died: 25 December 2012 (aged 94); Guasdualito, Apure

Augusto Bracca (23 April 1918 – 25 December 2012) was a Venezuelan folk composer.

== Biography ==
Bracca was born in Trinidad de Orichuna, Apure. In addition to his activity as a composer, he became a singer, through the help of Cándido Herrera, who also helped him in the interpretation of his compositions.

Augusto Bracca recognised in the singers José Catire Carpio and Juan de los Santos Contreras (El Carrao de Palmarito) two of his best interpreters. The former recorded, among others, two of the most famous pieces in his career - "Mi llano es un paraíso" and "Mi rancho llanero", and the latter made popular the famous piece "Chaparralito llanero".

There are many other singers who have successfully interpreted works of Augusto Bracca, for instance Eneas Perdomo, and Roiman Meza with the song Traigo polvo del camino, Cristóbal Jiménez with Dios te puso en mi camino, and Edith Salcedo, who recorded Amorcito de mi vida; also the Cuarteto Pueblo, María Teresa Chacín, Quinto Criollo, Lila Moreno, Juan Galea and Lilia Madrigal. The compositions of Bracca have travelled beyond the borders of Venezuela, to become favourite pieces of singers like Javier Solis, Olimpo Cárdenas, Irma Dorante and the Mariachi México.

Some of his most famous songs are: A mi ranchito escondido, Alto Apure, Amorcito de mi vida, Chaparralito llanero, Cariño lindo, El beso que te di, El negro José, Fiesta llanera en Elorza, Lindo amanecer, Traigo polvo del camino yo no olvido mi llanura, Qué bonito es Camaguán, among others.

Bracca died in Guasdualito, Apure, on December 25, 2012, aged 94.

== See also ==
- Venezuela
- Venezuelan music
