= Dinner in Caracas II =

Studio album by Aldemaro Romero and his Salon Orchestra
- Released: 1966; 1996 CD
- Recorded: 1966, Rome, Italy
- Genre: Folk-classical
- Label: RCA
- Producer: Aldemaro Romero

Dinner in Caracas II is a 33-RPM LP album by Venezuelan composer/arranger/conductor Aldemaro Romero, released in 1966, under contract with RCA Victor.

This album is the second volume of the 1955 Dinner in Caracas, as part of the modernization of Venezuelan folk music, upgrading it from folk instrumentations to full modern orchestral versions, and making it palatable to international audiences.

== Track listing ==
Track	Song title	Composer	Time
1.	Como llora una estrella	Antonio Carrillo	3:20
2.	Rosario	Juan Vicente Torrealba	3:20
3.	Ella se fue	José Reyna	2:50
4.	El Ausente	Alfredo Escalante	3:01
5.	Vals Nº 3	Antonio Lauro	3:26
6.	Carretera	Aldemaro Romero	2:54
7.	De Conde a Principal	Aldemaro Romero	2:47
8.	No me olvides	Eduardo Martínez Plaza	2:02
9.	Miraflores	Lionel Belasco	2:08
10.	Quinta Anauco	Aldemaro Romero	3:14
11.	Doña Mentira	Aldemaro Romero	2:05
12.	Catuche	Aldemaro Romero	2:16
