= Venezuelan merengue =

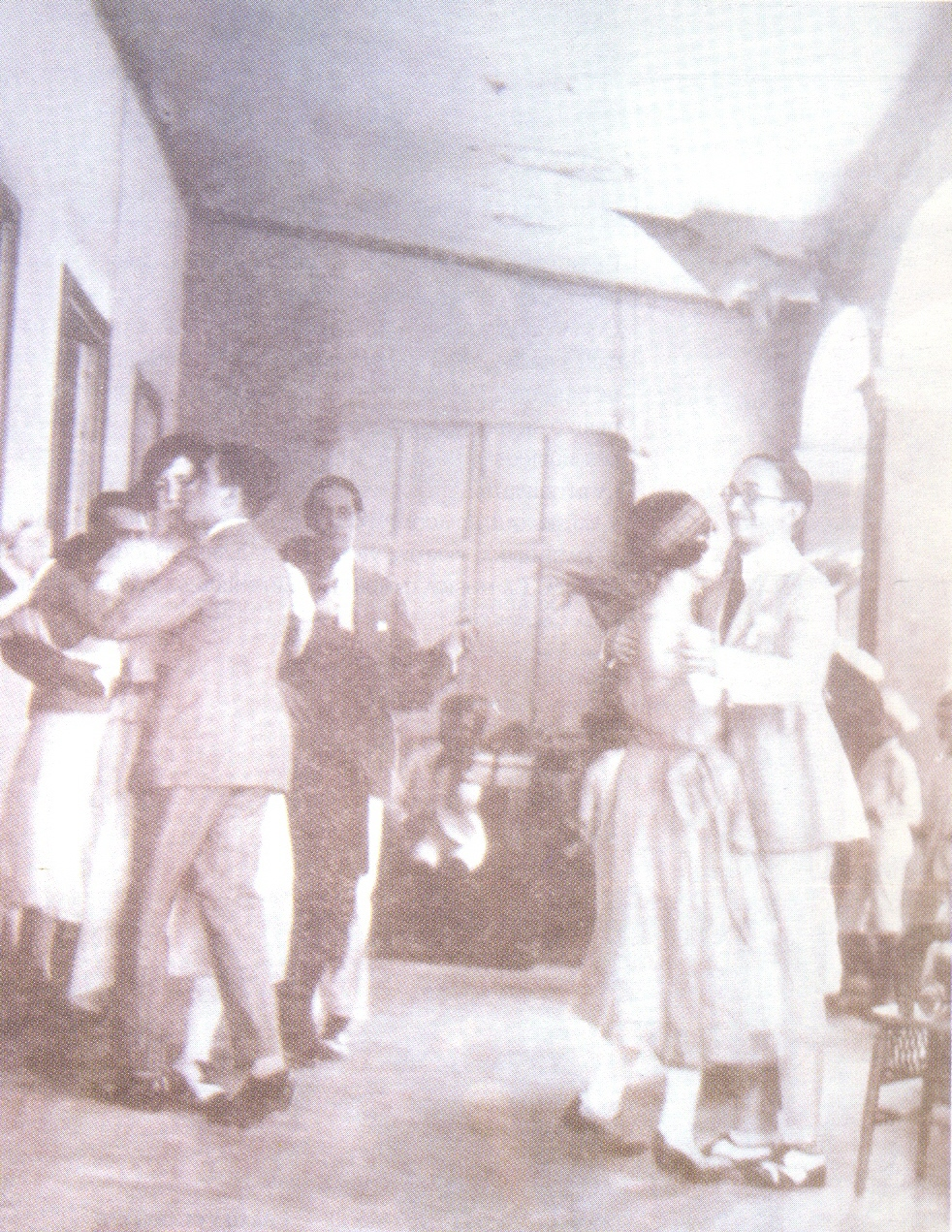
People dancing merengue rucaneao

Merengue is a musical form extended through all the Caribbean. The first occurrences of merengue in print in Venezuela are from scores of “dance merengue” of the second half of the 19th century. As a dance craze, merengue acquired popularity in Caracas during the 1920s. It is distinct from the vastly more popular Dominican merengue. Although they share the same name, the rhythms have very little in common, except that they were commonly written for partner dancing.

== History ==
The origins of the word are controversial. For some people, the word merengue comes from the French word “meringue”, a confection made from whipped egg whites. However, this concoction is called suspiro in Venezuela. There is a stronger link to a Haitian popular dance with that name. Another theory links the name to African words like “muserengue” or “tamtam mouringue”.

In Caracas, the term merengue rucaneao designated a way of dancing with couples holding and often featuring exaggerated hip movements (which added to the craze and subsequent controversy). Dances were paid affairs, with popular prices being “a locha” (12 1/2 cents) or “a medio” (25 cents) in dance halls known then as mabiles. Live accompaniment consisted of four solo instruments: trumpet, trombone, saxophone and clarinet and rhythm instruments such as the cuatro, bass and percussion (which, depending on the size of the ensemble, could be as simple as a scraper, or incorporate maracas and even a snare drum) . Travelling groups known as cañoneros walked around the neighborhoods staging impromptu performances for tips. The name "cañoneros" comes from their marketing approach, which included firing a carbide charge from a blank cannon made of a thick, hollowed-out bamboo cane.

== Rhythmic structure ==
Venezuelan Merengue in 2/4 notation

Venezuelan Merengue in 5/8 notation

There is no agreed way to properly notate the lilt of the Venezuelan Merengue. There are two main camps, or schools of thought, neither of which represents it properly:

The most frequently used option is to designate a 2/4 rhythm. The first half of the bar is written as an eighth-note triplet. The second half of the bar is written as two eighth notes. The unique swing in the second half is what gives Venezuelan merengue its lilt.

Another approach is to notate the Venezuelan merengue as 5/8. This is the way that traditional musicians used to prefer it as the notation is less busy, but it assumes familiarity with the unique swing of Venezuelan merengue.

Fredy Reyna proposed a third way in his cuatro method, Alfa Beta Cuatro, which consists of a 1/5 bar. It has not been widely adopted.

Regardless of notation, the juxtaposition of 3 against 2 is a very common theme that pervades Venezuelan music and is found in most of its forms, from joropo, to the myriad of Afro-Venezuelan drumming patterns.

== Formal musicians' contributions ==
Despite, or perhaps because its popular origins, Merengue was embraced wholeheartedly by the vast majority of Venezuela's Nationalistic classical composers. Pianist-composer Teresa Carreño wrote several merengues, and incorporated the form as an interlude in some of her pieces (for example, in her piece entitled Un Bal en Rêve). Pianist-composer Moisés Moleiro also wrote and performed merengues in his classical repertoire, as did Evencio Castellanos. Saxophonist-composer Daniel Milano Mayora penned quite a few merengues, both for popular interpretation as well as virtuoso solo piano pieces. Guitarist-composer Antonio Lauro wrote what is believed to be the first piece in the form for solo classical guitar, simply entitled Merengue (1945). Rodrigo Riera composed his first merengue for solo guitar, entitled Merengue Venezolano in the 1950s. Later, he wrote many other merengues. Singer Jesús Sevillano included several merengues in his repertoire, during the height of his singing career.

Contemporary Venezuelan formal musicians continue to cultivate and preserve the form. Jhibaro Rodriguez' (Maracay, 1971) arrangement of La Zapoara for solo guitar and León Zapata's (Caracas, 1955) composition entitled El Guaro are examples of Merengues written or arranged in the latter half of the 20th century.

== Outside of Venezuela ==
Outside of Venezuela, Merengue simply did not catch on. Even on its heyday very few composers and bandleaders dedicated any effort to this form, maybe because of the difficult rhythm. Trinidadian Lionel Belasco composed, performed and recorded some Venezuelan Merengues and Waltzes between the 1910s and the 1930s. Venezuelan composer Aldemaro Romero had a shot in the 1950s with an international release that included several merengues, but didn't go very far in the charts. More recently, Paquito D'Rivera wrote a Merengue, again, simply titled Merengue Venezolano.

Perhaps the best hope for the preservation of the form lies in the labor of active musicians that continue to compose, perform and teach merengue in other countries. Guitarist Aquiles Báez, multi-instrumentalist and educator Jackeline Rago, Canadian-based Ensemble Çavana, and the aforementioned Barradas and Gurrufío all are active practitioners of Venezuelan music worldwide.

== Examples ==
- Chupa tu Mamey
- Criollísima
- Chucho y Ceferina
- Un heladero con clase
- El Chivo
- San Juan to'lo tiene
- La Zapoara
- Barlovento
- Prestame tu máquina
- El Norte es una quimera
- Carmen la que contaba 16 años
- Negra la quiero
- La pelota de Carey
- El Cumaco De San Juan
- Compae Pancho

== See also ==
- Venezuela
- Venezuelan music
- Merengue music
