= Ángel Custodio Loyola =

Venezuelan singer & composer (1926–1985)

Background information
- Also known as: El renco Loyola; El tigre de Masaguarito
- Born: September 4, 1926; Mata Arzolera, Guárico, Venezuela
- Died: September 24, 1985 (aged 59) Cagua, Aragua, Venezuela
- Genres: Joropo
- Occupations: musician, singer, composer
- Years active: 1947–1985
- Labels: Discomoda, Cahilapo
- Formerly of: Juan Vicente Torrealba; Ignacio Figueredo

Ángel Custodio Loyola (September 4, 1926 – September 24, 1985), was a Venezuelan singer and composer, known as a pioneer in the joropo genre. He wrote many popular songs, including "El Gavilán", "Tierra Negra", "Carnaval", "Sentimiento Llanero", "Catira Marmoleña", "Faenas Llaneras", and "Puerto Miranda". He is considered to have been one of the greatest exponents of llanera music.

== Partial discography ==
- Pasaje contramarcado (Discomoda DCM-119)
- Buenos Aires llaneros (Discomoda DCM-195)
- Sentimiento llanero (Discomoda DCM-246)
- Corrío Apureño (Discomoda DCM-256)
- El guachamarón (Discomoda DCM-287)
- Travesias de Mata Larga (Discomoda DCM-298)
- El tigre de Masaguarito (Discomoda DCM-414)
- Señores, Aquí está un llanero (Discomoda DCM-462)
- Ay! Catira Marmoleña (Discomoda DCM-623)
- Sentir Venezolano (Philips 40.097)
- El Indio Modesto Laya (Palacio LPS-66.386)
- El Guariqueño si sabe (Cachilapo LPC-017)

=== Compilations ===
- El Disco de Oro de Ángel C. Loyola (Discomoda DCM-973)
- Ángel C. Loyola-El Carrao-Eneas Perdomo (Discomoda LP-TB 1402)
- Bravos del Canto Llanero (Discomoda DCM ER-20010)
- Clásicos llaneros de Ángel Custodio Loyola (Discomoda 601537)
- Loyola y El Carrao (Foca Records FD-43398673)

== See also ==
- Venezuelan music
