= Roberto Ruscitti =

Italian-Venezuelan composer (born 1941)

- Born: December 12, 1941; Cansano, L'Aquila
- Occupations: Composer, conductor

Roberto Ruscitti (Cansano, L'Aquila, December 12, 1941) was an Italian-Venezuelan composer, soloist and pianist, Nationally and internationally recognized for his compositions and for his interpretations of Venezuelan folk music. His Tango in Paradise can still be heard in Japan.

== Career ==
He studied under the tutelage of Vicente Emilio Sojo and Moises Moleiro at the Escuela Nacional de Música de Caracas, Venezuela, and graduated as Soloist and Composer for piano. Under the tutelage of Cristóbal Gornés, he graduated as Teacher of Musical Pedagogy at the Escuela de música Nacional "Sebastián Echeverría Lozano" in Valencia, Venezuela.

Ruscitti decided not to lock himself into only one musical style, causing the enrichment of music, with the tango and the tarantella, as well as the joropo, merengue, and salsa. Clips of some of his compositions and renderings can be heard at his website. He directed several orchestras and for several years produced his own radio program, in which he played requests from the listeners.

He founded the Academia Venezolana de Música Smith, as well as the Orquesta Juvenil Venezolana de acordeonistas which performed on Venezuelan television. Many of his students work professionally, developed projects for the diffusion of Venezuelan music in London (with the London Symphony Orchestra and the National Philharmonic, with the direction of Frank Barber), Madrid, Rome, United States and Canada. He has given many concerts with national and international artists like the tenors Carlos Almenar Otero, Roberto Aranguren and accordion players like, Pietro Deiro, Domingo Doglio.

Ruscitti died in 2014.

== Prizes and recognitions ==
- 1st Prize at the Certamen Nacional de Música clásica on accordion (1962)
- 1st Prize at the Certamen Nacional de Música clásica on accordion (1964)
- Gold Medal as Best Interpreter on accordion (1964), Silver and bronze medals at the World Championship of accordion, in Toronto, Canada (1964)
- Premio Nacional de la música (1985), as Director of the Orquesta Juvenil de Venezuela
- Copa Presidente de la República Dr. Raúl Leoni (1964, 1965, 1966), Best interpreter and artist on the accordion
- Andrés Bello National Order (1989), In recognition of his valuable labor promoting Venezuelan popular music and culture.
- El Sol dorado (1989), In recognition of his valuable labor promoting Venezuelan popular music and culture.

== Discography ==
- 2000 - Ensueño
- 2006 - Mi Mundo
- 2009 - Gocce d'Oro
- 2012 - Gotas de Oro

== See also ==
- Venezuela
- Venezuelan music
