= Morella Muñoz =

Venezuelan mezzo-soprano (1935–1995)

Background information
- Born: July 29, 1935; Caracas, Venezuela
- Died: July 15, 1995 (aged 59) Caracas, Venezuela
- Genres: Venezuelan folk music, classical music
- Occupations: Musician, singer
- Website: Morella Muñoz Foundation

Morella Valarino Muñoz (29 July 1935 – 15 July 1995) was a celebrated Venezuelan mezzo-soprano. She performed as a child under the pseudonym Morella Kenton, and as an adult as Morella Muñoz. She achieved national and international fame as a member of Venezuela's Counterpoint Quintet.

== Early life ==
Muñoz was born in San José Parish, in the Venezuelan capital of Caracas, to father Juan Antillano Valarino and mother Mercedes Muñoz. In 1946 she entered the Andrés Bello Lyceum, where she started singing with the choir. She attended Central University of Venezuela, where she performed with the university's choir.

== Career ==
In 1948, the adolescent Muñoz' talents led to her performing, under the pseudonym Morella Kenton, on Radiodifusora Venezuela. Her popularity soon led to her performing on television, with Víctor Saume on his variety program.

Muñoz began her formal vocal studies in 1953, at the School of Music Jose Angel Lamas. Her instructors included Inocente Carreño, Vicente Emilio Sojo and Juan Bautista Plaza.

In 1961, Muñoz made her debut at the Palazzo Forte in Verona, at the Academy of Musical Culture. That same year she was awarded the Prague Spring Prize.

In 1962, composer Rafael Suárez and Domingo Mendoza worked together to form the singing group Quinteto Contrapunto (Counterpoint Quintet). Muñoz joined fellow mezzo-soprano Aida Navarro, tenor Jesús Sevillano, Suárez singing baritone (in addition to composer, director) and Mendoza providing the bass voice. Performing traditional Venezuelan folk songs, Contrapunto achieved national and international fame, performing together until 1971, when Suárez unexpectedly died at age 41.

Muñoz continued to perform, and would later serve as advisor to the Venezuelan Minister of State for Culture, from 1989 to 1992.

== Personal life ==
Muñoz married Pedro Álvarez in 1961. She died in 1995, at age 59.

In 2007 Morella Muñoz' musical work was declared cultural heritage of the Libertador Municipality of Caracas.

Tuvo dos hijos, Gunilla Alvarez Muñoz y Diego Alvarez Muñoz. La primera dedicada a la producción de eventos musicales y promotra cultural y el segundo hijo un destacado intérprete del cajón gitano.

== Morella Muñoz Foundation ==
Shortly after her death, a group of family and friends created the Morella Muñoz Foundation. The Foundation organizes and sponsors events to keep Morella's legacy alive and also support young talents by providing a platform on which they can learn.

== Discography ==
With the Contrapunto Quintet, Muñoz recorded her first album in 1962. The group released five albums during its original nine-year existence (releasing others a few years after Muñoz' death). In 1967, Muñoz worked with Venezuelan classical guitarist and composer Alirio Díaz to create the album Alirio y Morella. In 1982 an anthological edition of 12 discs was released, accompanied by the testimonial book The Invention of Singing by Carlos González Vegas. In 1994 the album Morella Muñoz, Our Voice was released.

== Awards and decorations ==
- Venezuelan National Music Award
- Order of Andrés Bello
- Order of Francisco de Miranda
- Order of Merit at Work
- Order of Vicente Emilio Sojo
- Order of Luisa Amelia Perozo
