= Sylvia Constantinidis =

Venezuelan-American pianist, composer, and conductor

- Birth name: Maria Silvia Castillo Casanova Arismendi de Constantinidis
- Born: December 3, 1962 (age 62); Venezuela
- Genres: Classical
- Occupation(s): Pianist, Composer, Conductor, writer and music educator
- Instrument: Piano
- Website: www.sylviaconstantinidis.com

Sylvia Constantinidis (born December 3, 1962) is a Venezuelan-American pianist, composer, and conductor.

== Early life and education ==
Sylvia Constantinidis was born in Venezuela and began her study of music at an early age in Caracas. Her music teachers in Venezuela included Modesta Bor, Alberto Grau, Beatriz Bilbao and Isabel Aretz. She continued her studies in Paris at the Ecole Martenot and the Sorbonne university in Paris. She worked as a pianist in Venezuela, playing with orchestras and touring, and graduated with a Bachelor of Arts and Music from the Central University of Venezuela. In the 1990s, she graduated with a Masters in Piano Performance and later obtained a second Master in Music Theory and Composition, from the University of Miami. She also has a Diploma of Advanced Graduate Studies in Music from Boston University.

== Career ==
Constantinidis received The Music Note Award 2003 for her three children's operas Lincoln, Ponce de Leon, and The First Thanks Giving, which premiered in Florida. She was awarded the "Educator of Note Award 2003" by the Ethel and W. George Kennedy Family Foundation, and the ASCAP Plus Award for Concert Music in 2009 and 2010. She serves as artistic director of the Omorfia Contemporary Ensemble and the Southeast Composers Chamber Orchestra. Constantinidis has served as President of the Southeast Chapter of the National Association of Composers (NACUSA) in the United States.

== Awards and honors ==
Constantinidis list of grants, honors and awards include:

- "Global Music Award", Bronze Medal. Category: Protest Music. With the song and music video "Venezuela te Veremos Renacer" by Sylvia Constantinidis. March 3, 2018.
- "Artist Cultural Ambassador". "YLAI -Young Leaders of America- Professional Fellows Program Reverse Exchange" - U.S. Department of State Program. USA, Jan. 2018.
- "Artist-in-Residence". Visual Arts Multimedia & Sound Installations. Kroma Arts, USA, 2017.
- "Artist-in-Residence" -Fundacion Artistas Por La Paz -Venezuelan Foundation, 2016.
- "Urban Arts Berlin Award". Composition Visions included in International Compilation CD Synthesis, Recording Series, Vol 2. Berlin, Germany. July 2015.
- Educator of Note Honorable Mention. Young Patronesses of the Opera 20th Anniversary. South Florida, 2014.
- Fellow US Artist-Projects. United States Artist Program. Nominated by the Broward County Cultural Division. Florida, USA, 2012.
- ASCAP-PLUS AWARD –Concert Music-, ASCAP, 2010.
- 10th Latin Grammy, Nomination Best Classical Contemporary Composition for Macondo Poems on the ERM Masterworks of the New Era vol. 14. 2009.
- ASCAP-PLUS AWARD –Concert Music-, ASCAP, 2009.
- "International Award: ERM Media". Composition Macondo Poems included in International Compilation CD Masterworks of the New Era Recording Series, Volume 14, Jan 2007.
- "Featured Author", at the Miami International Book Fair. Three publications of Music Works for piano: Rubi & Stone Op.23, Suite Infantil Op.11, Impressions Op.13. Miami Dade College. Miami, 2006.
- "Grant Award", "THE EDUCATION FUND", Opera Adventure Project Disseminator Award. -Adapter Janet Duguay Kirsten at Claude Pepper Elementary School MDCPS 3. May 2006.
- "Grant Award", "THE EDUCATION FUND", Opera Adventure Project Disseminator Award.-Adapter Alina Mustelier at Claude Pepper Elementary School MDCPS
- "Educator of Note Award 2003", Music Educator of the Year Award, "Ethel and W. George Kennedy Family Foundation" and the Young Patronesses of the Opera, the Florida Grand Opera. For creatively motivating and inspiring young children in the field of music education, promoting the Opera field and the creation of Three Children Operas (original composition works), 2003.
- "Grant Award": GFWC Hialeah Womans Club. Conductor, String Youth Orchestra Program, Dec. 2002.
- Grant: "THE EDUCATION FUND" Opera Adventure Project Dissemination, May 2002.
- "Grant Award", "THE EDUCATION FUND" Opera Adventure Project, Jan 2001.

== Selected works ==
Constantinidis composes for orchestra, chamber ensemble, theater and film scores. Selected works include:

- Pierrot et Colombine, Op. 68, Concerto for violin, marimba and orchestra, 2009
- Cantos de Espanha, Concerto for harpsichord and orchestra, Op. 63, 2008-9
- Treize Études, Op. 53, for orchestra, 2006-7
- Études de Concert, Op. 52, for cello and piano, 2007
- Études de Concert, Op. 51, for piano
- Macondo Poem, Op. 41, for Piccolo, Flute, Oboe, Clarinet & Bassoon, 2005

== Publications ==
=== Books ===
- Constantinidis, MariaSilvia Castillo (2008). Treize Etudes Pour L'Orchestre (MM Thesis). University of Miami.
- Constantinidis, Sylvia (2012). Space and Time Continuity: On My 13 Etudes Pour L'Orchestre. Germany: LAP Lambert Academic Publishing AG & Co. KG. ISBN 978-3848427086.
- "Start Method", a collection of educational materials for piano, strings, voice, solfege, music theory and ear-training.

=== Articles ===
- Constantinidis, Sylvia (1 June 2016). "La Contemporaneidad en la Obra Para Piano de Antonio Estevez" (PDF). Revista Cultural Carohana. 20. Barquisimeto, Venezuela: Universidad Pedagogica Experimental Libertador: 46–49.
- Constantinidis, Sylvia (Summer 2015). "ISCM-Young Composers Award: A Commission Opportunity for Young Composers" (PDF). ComposerUSA. 1 (1). National Association of Composers of The United States NACUSA: 8.
- Constantinidis, Sylvia (January 2006). "Mozart, Cervantes and The Greek Satire". Polygon. 1 (1). Florida, USA: Liberal Arts and Sciences Department, Miami-Dade College, Hialeah Campus.

== Discography ==
- Federico S. Villena: Musica Para Piano de Salon. Pianist: Sylvia Constantinidis. UCV. Tesis La Musica Para Piano de Salon de Federico S. Villena: Una Manifestacion del Eclecticismo Musical de Venezuela en el Siglo XIX. Caracas, Venezuela. July 1987.
- Work: Macondo Poems, for Woodwind Quintet, by Sylvia Constantinidis. CD: Masterworks yof The New Era Vol.14, ERM Media Label. Jan 2007.
- Sylvia Par Elle-Même CD of Piano Music composed and performed by Sylvia Constantinidis. Coleccion Latinoamericana. Guinima Media Label. USA, 2012.
- Venezuela XIX: Danzas. Musica Para Piano de Salon. Pianist: Sylvia Constantinidis. Coleccion Latinoamericana. Guinima Media Label. USA, 2013.
- Work: Visions for Chamber Orchestra, Prepared Digital SoundTrack and Alleatory Audience Participation, by Sylvia Constantinidis. Recorded live at the Flamingo International Festival of Contemporary Music 2010 with the Secco Sinfonietta conducted by Sylvia Constantinidis. CD: Synthesis No. 2. by Urban Arts Berlin Label. Berlin, Germany. 2015.
- Song of Peace. A CD of LatinAmerican Classical Piano Music. Pianist Sylvia Constantinidis. Fundacion Artistas por La Paz. Coleccion Latinoamericana. Guinima Media Label. USA. 2016.
- Alberto Ginastera Centennial. Pianist: Sylvia Constantinidis. XIX Festival Latinoamericano de Musica Contemporanea -Sponsor-. Coleccion Latinoamericana. Guinima Media Label. USA.2016.
- Antonio Estevez: 17 Piezas Infantiles. Pianist: Sylvia Constantinidis. XIX Festival Latinoamericano de Musica Contemporanea -Sponsor-. Coleccion Latinoamericana. Guinima Media Label. USA. 2017.

== Literature ==
- "Sylvia Constantinidis: Visions (2006)" en Capitulo 4: "Uso de Referentes Culturales en la Musica Electroacustica en la Primera Decada del Siglo XXI: El Caso de Venezuela." de la Thesis Doctoral: Rojas Ramírez, Y. (2015). PhD Thesis "Mestizaje Cultural y Nacionalismo en la Musica Electroacustica Iberoamericana de la Primera Decada del Siglo XXI : El Caso Concreto de Venezuela" [Tesis doctoral no publicada. Universitat Politècnica de València. España.doi:10.4995/Thesis/10251/53566. Pp : 11, 210, 214, 250-253, 272, 321, 325, 350, 352, 360. Retrieved January 1, 2017.
- Miranda, Ricardo y Tello, Aurelio. (2011). "La Musica en Latinoamerica : La Busqueda Perpetua : lo propio y lo universal de la cultura latinoamericana." Secretaria de Relaciones Exteriores. Direccion General del Acervo Historico Diplomatico. Mexico.. Pp 279. Retrieved January 1, 2017.
- Pinto, Juan C. (2012). "Sylvia Constantinidis" in : "Art Music of Venezuela". Blog. Oct 5, 2012.. Retrieved January 10, 2017.
- "Sylvia Constantinidis". Score Magazine. University of Miami. Coral Gables, USA. May 2012..
- "NoteWorthy". Notations Magazine. Canadian Music Center. Spring 2013, Vol. 20, no. 1: pp. 8. Toronto, ON, Canada. May, 2013. Retrieved February 1, 2017.
- Pfitzinger, Scott. (2017). "A Compendium of Composers, Their Teachers, and Their Students." Rowman & Littlefield. Mar 1, 2017. Pp : 17, 52, 61, 107, 209, 299, 502. (ISBN 1442272252, 9781442272255)

== See also ==
- Fondazione Adkins Chiti: Donne in Musica
