= Punto (Venezuela) =

Music genre

- Stylistic origins: Hispanic folk music traditions
- Cultural origins: Spread from Spain to the American colonies
- Typical instruments: Mandolin; cuatro; guitar

The punto is a musical genre typical of eastern Venezuela. It is also called punto y llanto, punto cruzado, punto fuerte and punto mampó.

== See also ==
- Venezuelan music
