= Patafunk =

Venezuelan DJ and producer (born 1978)

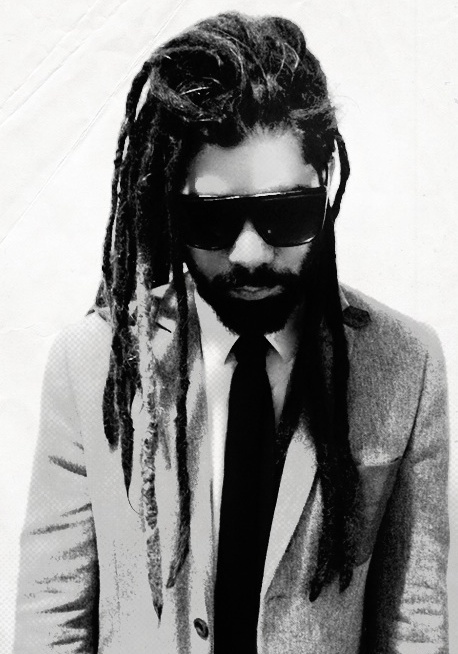
- Patafunk

Background information
- Also known as: Patafunk, Pata, Cem
- Born: Carlos Eduardo Martínez Llanos; December 5, 1978 (age 47)
- Origin: Venezuela
- Genres: Latin; Alternative
- Years active: 2007–present
- Members: Carlos Eduardo Martinez Llanos
- Website: Patafunk

Carlos Eduardo Martinez (born December 5, 1978), better known by his stage name Patafunk or Pata, is a Venezuelan DJ, producer, and musician with over 20 years of experience. He brings many musical styles and impressive technical skills to his DJ sets, having performed at numerous venues thanks to his eclectic taste.

== Career ==
=== Early career (1997-2002) ===
In 1997, Patafunk entered a recording studio for the first time, contributing to the Latin Ska song "No Es Mi Guerra" on the Venezuela Ska Vol. 1 compilation. He recorded additional tracks for compilations and performed as the opening act for prominent Latin American bands in Maracaibo City. In 2000, Patafunk began his DJ career as a guest selector for DJ Juan Badell, playing a diverse mix of Ska, Reggae, Swing, Lounge, Rock, and other genres. Inspired by House Music during a stay in San Francisco (2002), Patafunk transitioned into the genre and secured his first residency at Fuse in North Beach.

=== Patafunk events and radio shows (2003-2014) ===
Upon returning to Venezuela (2003), Patafunk collaborated with other DJs and artists to create "Patafunk" events, combining House Music, art, and fashion. These events had a significant impact on Maracaibo's music and art scene. He launched his first radio show, "Patafunk Radio," followed by "El Disco Es Cultura" on La Mega de Maracaibo. In 2007, his nationally syndicated show "Patafunk Radio" began airing on La Mega Estacion, continuing until 2014.

=== Musical success and New York City (2008-2020) ===
Between 2008 and 2011, Patafunk released two critically acclaimed albums, "Dubdelic" and "Playa," featuring a blend of Latin, Pop, and Disco-Funk influences. His songs topped Venezuelan charts and received praise from Rolling Stone, Billboard Magazine, and MTV Latin America for their unique and pleasant sound.

He became a household name in Venezuela, touring nationwide and hosting his radio show on contemporary music. In 2010, Patafunk relocated to New York City, further establishing himself as a prolific DJ and producer. He released original singles and remixes for artists like The Knocks, Goldroom, Phoenix, and others.

As a DJ, Patafunk played regularly throughout NYC at renowned venues like Hotel Hugo, Ophelia, Buddakan, Le Bain, Soho House, Zuma and many more. His music also graced international festivals like SXSW, Tribeca Film Festival, CMJ, and Miami Art Basel.

=== Recent work and Miami (2020-present) ===
Patafunk's third album, "High Life!" (2020), fused his Latin-reggae roots with New York's multicultural influences. It featured over 25 musicians and spawned six music videos, with the song "Solo" reaching the Venezuelan charts. This album was released in partnership with Greenpoint Records

In 2020, he moved to La Jolla, California, to focus on music near the West Coast. This period has resulted in his fourth album, "El Baile de la Extinción" (2024), featuring a tropical Afro-Caribbean folk sound and more mature lyrics.

Patafunk relocated to Miami Beach and became a DJ who lives and plays in the Floridian city of Miami Beach and has collaborated with Venezuelan artist Edo Ilustrado and appeared on shows like "George Harris and "Entregrados"

He also initiated the music series "Patavision," currently in progress with over 98 singles released by Oct 2024. Patafunk uses Patavision as his main studio project but is currently producing other artists, while keeping his DJ life playing in venues in Miami like Mila Lounge, Dante's HiFi, Juvia, Mad Radio, Miami Sound Bar, and the Piel de Oro Tan Parties among others.

== Discography ==
=== Albums ===
- El Baile de la Extinción - (2022)
- High Life! - (2020)
- Playa - (2011)
- Dubdelic - (2008)

=== Singles ===
- "El Pescador feat Rafaela - (2024)
- "Que Vamos a Hacer? (Oripoto Remix) - (2024)
- "Libertad - (2024)
- "Just for Fun" feat Nati Roman - (2023)
- "Baby I Love Your Way - (2023)
- "Creo e' Calle" feat DJ Damasta - (2021)
- "Hit & Run!" feat DaniBlau - (2015)
- "Free Your Feet" feat Sephira - (2014)
- "Free & Original" - (2012)
- "I Want To See You Again" feat Skip Rage - (2012)

P-A-T-A-V-I-S-I-O-N- S-E-R-I-E-S-

PATAVSION 'SEASON 06'

- "Patavision 100 (To Yourself) feat Jahzel Dotel" - (2025)
- "Patavision 98 (Elements) feat Issac Rudder" - (2024)
- "Patavision 98 (Y Sin Dinero) feat Los Navajazos de la Salsa" - (2024)
- "Patavision 97 (Sacate ese Kite) feat Pedrohernandezmusic" - (2024)
- "Patavision 96 (Make Me Feel) feat Savany" - (2024)
- "Patavision 95 (Una Aventura) feat Klau !" - (2024)
- "Patavision 94 (Bailando) feat Morella" - (2024)
- "Patavision 93 (Work It Baby) feat El Beau" - (2024)
- "Patavision 92 (The Beat) feat DD King" - (2023)
- "Patavision 91 (El Tiempo) feat Ari Blik" - (2023)

PATAVSION 'SEASON 05'

- "Patavision 90" - (2023)
- "Patavision 89" - (2023)
- "Patavision 88" - (2023)
- "Patavision 87" - (2023)
- "Patavision 86" - (2023)
- "Patavision 85" - (2023)
- "Patavision 84" - (2023)
- "Patavision 83" - (2023)
- "Patavision 82" - (2023)
- "Patavision 81" - (2023)
- "Patavision 80" - (2023)
- "Patavision 79" - (2023)
- "Patavision 78" - (2023)
- "Patavision 77" - (2023)
- "Patavision 76" - (2023)
- "Patavision 75" - (2023)
- "Patavision 74" - (2023)
- "Patavision 73" - (2023)

PATAVSION 'SEASON 04'

- "Patavision 72" - (2023)
- "Patavision 71" - (2023)
- "Patavision 70" - (2023)
- "Patavision 69" - (2023)
- "Patavision 68" - (2023)
- "Patavision 67" - (2023)
- "Patavision 66" - (2023)
- "Patavision 65" - (2023)
- "Patavision 64" - (2023)
- "Patavision 63" - (2023)
- "Patavision 62" - (2023)
- "Patavision 61" - (2023)
- "Patavision 60" - (2023)
- "Patavision 59" - (2023)
- "Patavision 58" - (2022)
- "Patavision 57" - (2022)
- "Patavision 56" - (2022)
- "Patavision 55" - (2022)

PATAVSION 'SEASON 03'

- "Patavision 54" - (2023)
- "Patavision 53" - (2023)
- "Patavision 52" - (2022)
- "Patavision 51" - (2022)
- "Patavision 50" - (2022)
- "Patavision 49" - (2022)
- "Patavision 48" - (2022)
- "Patavision 47" - (2022)
- "Patavision 46" - (2022)
- "Patavision 45" - (2022)
- "Patavision 44" - (2022)
- "Patavision 43" - (2022)
- "Patavision 42" - (2022)
- "Patavision 41" - (2022)
- "Patavision 40" - (2022)
- "Patavision 39" - (2022)
- "Patavision 38" - (2022)
- "Patavision 37" - (2022)

PATAVISION 'SEASON 02'

- "Patavision 36" - (2022)
- "Patavision 35" - (2022)
- "Patavision 34" - (2022)
- "Patavision 33" - (2022)
- "Patavision 32" - (2022)
- "Patavision 31" - (2022)
- "Patavision 30" - (2022)
- "Patavision 29" - (2022)
- "Patavision 28" - (2022)
- "Patavision 27" - (2022)
- "Patavision 26" - (2022)
- "Patavision 25" - (2022)
- "Patavision 24" - (2022)
- "Patavision 23" - (2022)
- "Patavision 22" - (2022)
- "Patavision 21" - (2022)
- "Patavision 20" - (2022)
- "Patavision 19" - (2022)

PATAVISION 'SEASON 01'

- "Patavision 18" - (2022)
- "Patavision 17" - (2022)
- "Patavision 16" - (2022)
- "Patavision 15" - (2022)
- "Patavision 14" - (2022)
- "Patavision 13" - (2022)
- "Patavision 12" - (2022)
- "Patavision 11" - (2022)
- "Patavision 10" - (2022)
- "Patavision 09" - (2022)
- "Patavision 08" - (2022)
- "Patavision 07" - (2022)
- "Patavision 06" - (2022)
- "Patavision 05" - (2022)
- "Patavision 04" - (2022)
- "Patavision 03" - (2021)
- "Patavision 02" - (2021)
- "Patavision 01" - (2021)

=== Remixes ===
- Major Lazer J Balvin El Alfa - Que Calor _ (2025)
- J. Cole - Wet Dreamz _ (2025)
- Rawayana Akapellah - Veneka _ (2025)
- Doechii - Anxiety _ (2025)
- Elena Rose Danny Ocean]] Jerry Di]] - Caracas en el 2000 _ (2025)
- Technotronic - Get Up _ (2025)
- Oswave - Hug Me _ (2021)
- Blond:ish & Rowee - Garden Of 3den _ (2021)
- Nerio's Dubwork Darryl Pandy - "Feel It" (2016)
- Minoo Javan - "Nessa Nessa" (2016)
- De La Soul feat Shaka Khan – "All Good?" (2015)
- The Wailing Wailers - "Simmer Down" (2015)
- C+ - "Who's The One" (2014)
- Pat Lok Bear Mountain – "Same Hearts" (2014)
- Eddie Amador – "House Music" (2013)
- Treasure Fingers The Knocks – "My Body" (2013)
- Goldroom – "Morgan's Bay" - (2013)
- Phoenix – "Trying To be Cool" - (2013)
- The Sandals – "The Endless Summer" - (2013)
- Willie Colón & Hector Lavoe – "Todo Tiene Su Final" - (2013)
- The B-52's – "Love Shack" - (2013)
- Stardust – "Music Sounds Better With You" - (2012)
- Sunsplash – "Interference" - (2011)
- María y José Sunsplash Ernesto Pantin - Violentao (2010)
- Mirla Castellanos – "Con El Corazon En Las Manos" - (2010)
- Aldemaro Romero – "La Caracola" - (2007)

== See also ==
- Venezuelan music
