= Aida Navarro =

Venezuelan mezzo-soprano (born 1937)

Aída Navarro Baldivián
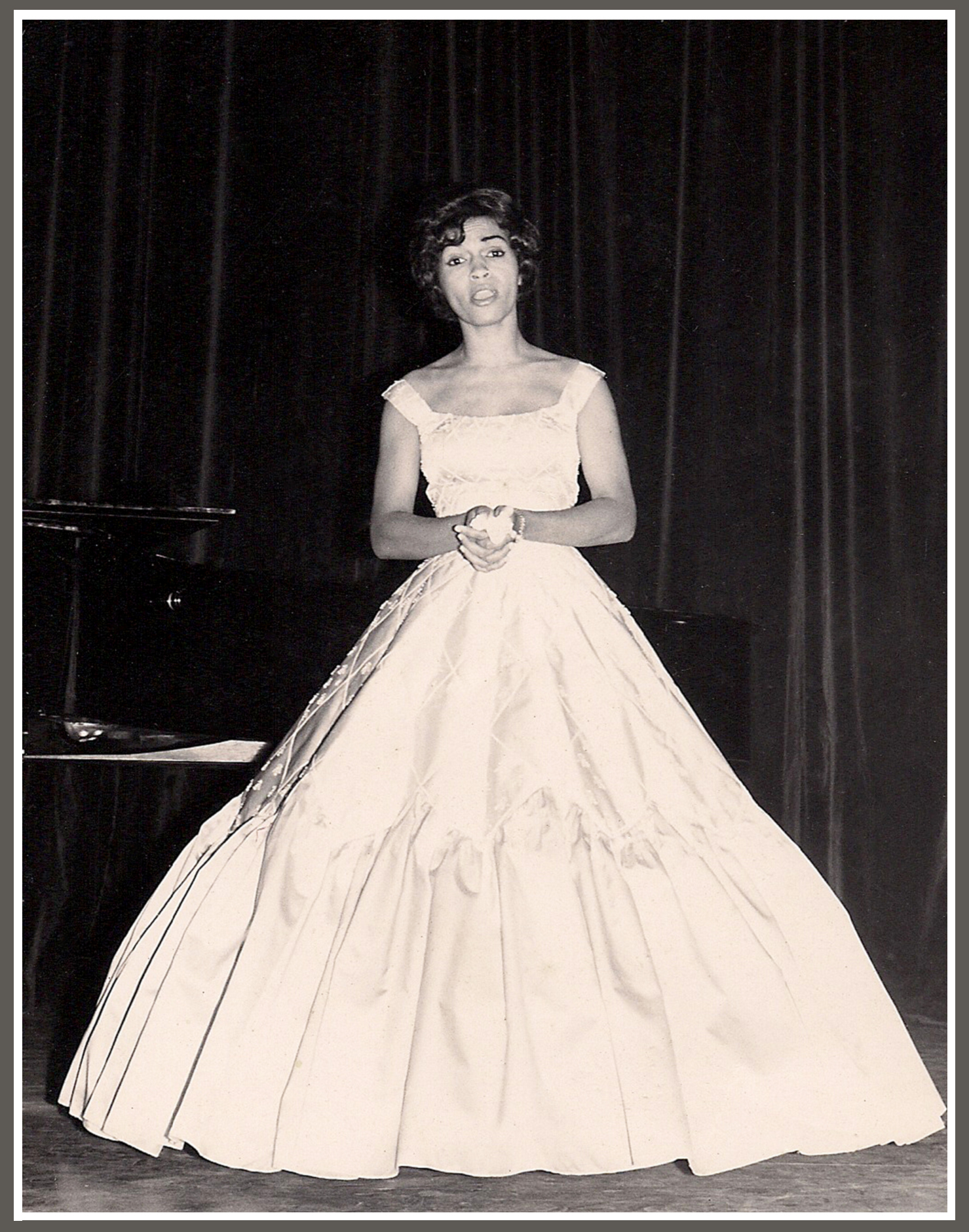
- Aída Navarro - Sala de Conciertos UCV - 1965

Background information
- Born: October 18, 1936 (age 89); Caracas, Venezuela
- Genres: Classical, opera, lied, chamber music
- Occupations: Mezzo-soprano, pedagogue
- Instrument: Vocals
- Years active: 1960s–present
- Formerly of: Quinteto Contrapunto
- Website: https://aidanavarromezzosoprano.bandcamp.com/

Aída Navarro Baldivián (born October 18, 1936) is a Venezuelan mezzo-soprano, pedagogue, and co-founder of the vocal ensemble Quinteto Contrapunto. She is recognized as one of Venezuela's most distinguished classical singers, with a career spanning performance, teaching, and arts administration across Latin America, North America, and Europe.

== Early life and education ==
Navarro was born in Caracas, Venezuela. She studied lyric singing at the Escuela de Música Juan Manuel Olivares in Caracas, at the Juilliard School of Music in New York, and at the Hochschule für Musik und darstellende Kunst in Vienna, Austria. In Vienna, she studied under the Italian mezzo-soprano Giulietta Simionato, among other distinguished teachers. During her studies abroad, she also received training in dance, fencing, and acting, which complemented her vocal and stagecraft development.

== Career ==
Navarro performed in operas and chamber music concerts across Europe, North America, and Latin America. In 1962, she co-founded Quinteto Contrapunto, a pioneering Venezuelan vocal ensemble dedicated to the interpretation of Venezuelan folk and popular music in a classical style. The group's other founding members included Morella Muñoz, Otilia Rodríguez (mezzo-sopranos), Jesús Sevillano (tenor), Rafael Suárez (baritone, director, arranger, and cuatro player), and Domingo Mendoza (bass).

Her operatic repertoire included roles such as Azucena in Verdi's Rigoletto, Mercedes in Bizet's Carmen, Rosina in Scarlatti's Il trionfo dell'onore, Carmen Gloria in Banfield's Colloquio col tango, Donna Elvira in Mozart's Don Giovanni, and Suzuki in Puccini's Madama Butterfly.

== Teaching and administrative career ==
For many years, Navarro dedicated herself to teaching lyric singing. She served as a music teacher and choral director in national schools and high schools. She held professorial positions in singing at the Escuela de Música Juan Manuel Olivares, the Conservatorio Juan José Landaeta, the Conservatorio Lino Gallardo, and the Escuela Superior de Música José Ángel Lamas. She also taught singing, Lied interpretation, oratorio, and classical opera at the Taller de Ópera de Caracas and the Taller de Capacitación Operística of the Teatro Teresa Carreño.

From 1989 to 1991, she served as Assistant Director of the Escuela de Música Juan Manuel Olivares. She was also a professor of singing at the Universidad Metropolitana in Caracas.

She continues to work as a private voice teacher.

== Awards and recognition ==
- 1967 – International Singing Competition, Rio de Janeiro, Brazil: Best Chamber Music Interpreter (sole prize)
- 1969 – International Singing Competition, Rio de Janeiro, Brazil: Third Prize (all genres)
- 1970 – International Singing Competition, Montreal, Canada: Winner

She has also received the Orden 27 de junio (First and Third Classes) and a decoration from the District 3 of the Zona Educativa in Venezuela.
