= Beatriz Bilbao =

Venezuelan composer (born 1951)

Beatriz Bilbao (born 8 December 1951) is a Venezuelan composer. She was born in Caracas, Venezuela, and studied piano with Judith James and Gerty Haas, composition with Modesta Bor, and conducting with Alberto Grau and Gonzalo Castellanos in Venezuela. She continued her studies at the Jacobs School of Music at Indiana University Bloomington with Frederick Fox, Juan Orrego Salas and John Eaton and at the New England Conservatory of Music and the Cluj Napoca Conservatory in Romania.

After completing her studies, Bilbao worked as a composer and music teacher. In 1991 she took a teaching position at the Instituto Universitario de Estudios Musicales (IUDEM) in Caracas and from 2001 to 2002 served as director of the Ministry of Culture's Prudencio Esáa Music School. Her music has been performed internationally.

== Honors and awards ==
- 1995 Ramón Delgado Palacios National Prize for her piano work Secuencias Mestizas
- 1994 Munizipal Prizes for Trilogía Aborígen and Four Color Dances
- 1989 First Symphonic Composition Contest Seguros la Previsora prize for Concierto de las Tres Esferas

== Works ==
Bilbao works with both electronic media and acoustic instruments, composing for orchestra, chamber ensembles, electroacoustics, electronics, vocal and piano performance. Selected works include:

- Madaka
- Secuencias Mestizas III
- La Saeta 1995
- La Passionaria
- La Fiesta de San Juan
- Siete Luces for synthesizers and orchestra
- Triángulo Mágico for two synthesizers and symphonic orchestra, with Ricardo Teruel
- Trilogía Aborígen, vocal work
- Four Color Dances for piano
- Concierto de las Tres Esferas for two synthesizers and orchestra

Her music has been recorded and issued on CD, including:

- Espirales de Prana Label: sin contrato discográfico
