= Magdalena Sánchez =

Venezuelan singer

Background information
- Also known as: Queen of the Venezuelan song
- Born: April 9, 1915; Puerto Cabello, Carabobo, Venezuela
- Died: August 18, 2005 (aged 90); Caracas, Venezuela
- Genres: Joropo, Venezuelan folk music
- Occupation(s): musician, singer, composer

Magdalena Sánchez (born Puerto Cabello, Carabobo, Venezuela April 9, 1915; died Caracas, August 18, 2005) was a Venezuelan singer, better known as the Queen of the Venezuelan song.

== See also ==
- Venezuelan music
