= Luis Laguna =

Venezuelan musician (1926–1984)

- Born: May 1, 1926; Guacara, Carabobo, Venezuela
- Died: August 1, 1984 (aged 58); Maracay, Aragua, Venezuela
- Occupation(s): Musician, songwriter

Luis Alfredo Laguna (lah-goo'-nah) (May 1, 1926 – August 1, 1984) was a Venezuelan musician and songwriter.

Born in the tiny city of Guacara, Carabobo, Laguna moved at an early age with his family to Maracay, Aragua, where he grew up and started his education. Largely self-taught, he excelled as a gifted guitarist and prolific songwriter, while creating a distinctive style of his own by using contemporary harmonies and rhythms as well as gorgeous melodies in his works. Author of significant Venezuelan waltzes and joropos, he also had a strong predilection for the merengue caraqueño. Some of his most popular songs are Al poeta, Criollísima, Golosinas criollas, El saltarín, El tramao, Mi merengue, Nathalia, Serenata, S.O.S. and Un heladero con clase, among others.

Laguna died in 1984 at his home of Maracay at the age of 58, following complications from diabetes.
