= Antonio Lauro =

Venezuelan musician and composer (1917–1986)

- Born: August 3, 1917; Ciudad Bolívar, Venezuela
- Died: April 18, 1986 (aged 68) Caracas, Venezuela
- Genres: Classical music, Venezuelan popular music
- Occupations: Musician, guitarist, composer, choir singer, music teacher
- Instrument: Guitar
- Formerly of: Venezuela Symphony Orchestra

María Carolina Antonio Lauro

Antonio Lauro (August 3, 1917 – April 18, 1986) was a Venezuelan musician, considered to be one of the foremost composers for the guitar in the 20th century.

== Biography ==
Antonio Lauro was born in Ciudad Bolívar, Venezuela. His father Antonio Lauro Ventura, an Italian immigrant, was a barber who could sing and play the guitar so he taught his son what he could, but died when Antonio was still a child. After the family moved to Caracas, Lauro pursued formal musical study (piano, composition) at the Academia de Música y Declamación, where the composer Vicente Emilio Sojo (1887–1974) was one of his teachers. A 1932 concert performed in Caracas by Agustín Barrios, the Paraguayan guitarist and composer, so much impressed the young Lauro (already an accomplished folk guitarist) that he was persuaded to abandon piano and violin in favor of the guitar. From 1933, Lauro studied with Raúl Borges (1888–1967), and was introduced to the classical guitar repertoire. In the next decade, Borges' pupils would also include Rodrigo Riera, José Rafael Cisneros, and Alirio Díaz. These colleagues, especially Díaz, were later responsible for unveiling Lauro's works to an international audience, introducing these unheard works to, among others, Andrés Segovia, Leo Brouwer and John Williams.

Like many South Americans of his generation, Lauro was a fervent cultural nationalist, determined to rescue and celebrate his nation's musical heritage. As a member of the Trio Cantores del Trópico in 1935–1943 (Lauro sang bass and played both guitar and cuatro), he toured nearby countries to introduce them to Venezuelan music. Lauro was particularly attracted to the myriad colonial parlour valses venezolanos (Venezuelan waltzes) created in the previous century by accomplished national composers such as Ramón Delgado Palacios (1867–1902). Unfailingly melodic and characterized by a distinctive syncopation (created by a hemiola in which two measures of 3/4 become a single measure of 3/2), such music was precisely the sort of folkloric raw material which Smetana, Bartók or Granados had elevated to the category of national art in Europe.

A concert whose programme consisted entirely of such valses venezolanos (Venezuelan waltzes) by the distinguished Venezuelan pianist Evencio Castellanos (1914–1984) convinced Lauro that the guitar, too, should have comparable pieces in its repertory. Among his first efforts in this genre were the pieces later known as Tatiana, Andreína, and Natalia, composed sometime between 1938 and 1940; their instant popularity inspired still others. In addition to his guitar pieces, Lauro composed dozens of works for orchestra, choir, piano and voice; many of which remain unpublished. He occasionally experimented with modern compositional techniques, but most of his guitar music remains essentially on the Calle Real or "main street," an expression used by musicians of Lauro's generation to refer to a straight and direct route, without distracting harmonic detours.

In 1948, the military junta of General Marcos Pérez Jiménez imprisoned Lauro for his principled belief in democracy. Lauro later shrugged off the experience, telling his friends that prison was a normal part of life for the Venezuelan man of his generation. He had continued composing even in prison, and after his release immediately returned to performing with a pioneering professional classical guitar trio, the freshly formed Trio Raúl Borges. In the following decades Lauro's compositions were published, recorded and performed throughout the world, and his contributions to his nation's musical life were recognized and acknowledged. Lauro was appointed professor of guitar at several distinguished schools including the Juan José Landaeta Conservatory, and was named president of the Venezuela Symphony Orchestra where he played the horn. In spite of his modest insistence that he was a composer rather than a performer, he was persuaded by his friends to embark upon a solo concert tour, which began in Venezuela and culminated in a triumphant 1980 performance at London's Wigmore Hall. Shortly before his death at Caracas in 1986, he was presented with the Premio Nacional de Música, his country's highest artistic award.

== Popular works ==
- Seis por derecho: Joropo
- María Carolina
- Ana Cristina
- El Marabino
- Natalia
- Suite Venezolana
- Angostura
- Maria Luisa
- Nelly
- 4 Valses venezolanos
- Mañanita Caraqueña
- El Negrito
- Triptico

== Legacy ==
The works of Antonio Lauro have long been very popular with guitarists worldwide, yet there have been few recordings devoted exclusively to him. However, several recordings by Adam Holzman, John Williams (guitarist) and David Russell have been issued. John Williams is quoted as having referred to Antonio Lauro as being the "Strauss of the guitar".

Additionally, Lauro's works have been the core of studies, workshops and masterclasses in universities all around the world.

== Recordings by Lauro ==
- Antonio Lauro y sus mejores intérpretes (Nelly Carvajal Producciones)
- Lauro interpreta a Lauro (Nelly Carvajal Producciones)

== Bibliography ==
- Frank, Elliot Paul: The Venezuelan Waltzes of Antonio Lauro – Thesis/dissertation/manuscript (1994). OCLC: 35822159
- (in Spanish) Alejandro Bruzual: Antonio Lauro – Publisher: FUNDARTE, Caracas (1998) ISBN 980-253-338-6 OCLC: 43905994
- (in Spanish) Alejandro Bruzual: Antonio Lauro, Un Músico Total: Su Época, Su Vida y Su Obra – Ensayo Biografico – Publ. CVG Siderúrgica del Orinoco, Caracas (1995). OCLC: 43468475
- Daniel Oliver Smith: Notes on graduate guitar recital 5/91 – Thesis/dissertation/manuscript (1991). OCLC: 25978521
- (in Spanish) Alirio Díaz; Vicente Emilio Sojo; Antonio Lauro; Benito Canónico; Agustín Barrios: Solos de guitarra – Publ. Grabaciones Espiral, Caracas [undated] OCLC: 48358423
- Rick Laezman: 100 Hispanic Americans who changed American history – Publ. World Almanac Library, Milwaukee, WI (2005) ISBN 0-8368-5769-0 OCLC: 57142327
- Cesar Alegre: Extraordinary Hispanic Americans – Publ. Children's Press, New York (2006) ISBN 0-516-25343-3 OCLC: 62330607

== See also ==
- Music of Venezuela
- Waltz
