= Mérida State Symphony Orchestra =

- Orchestra
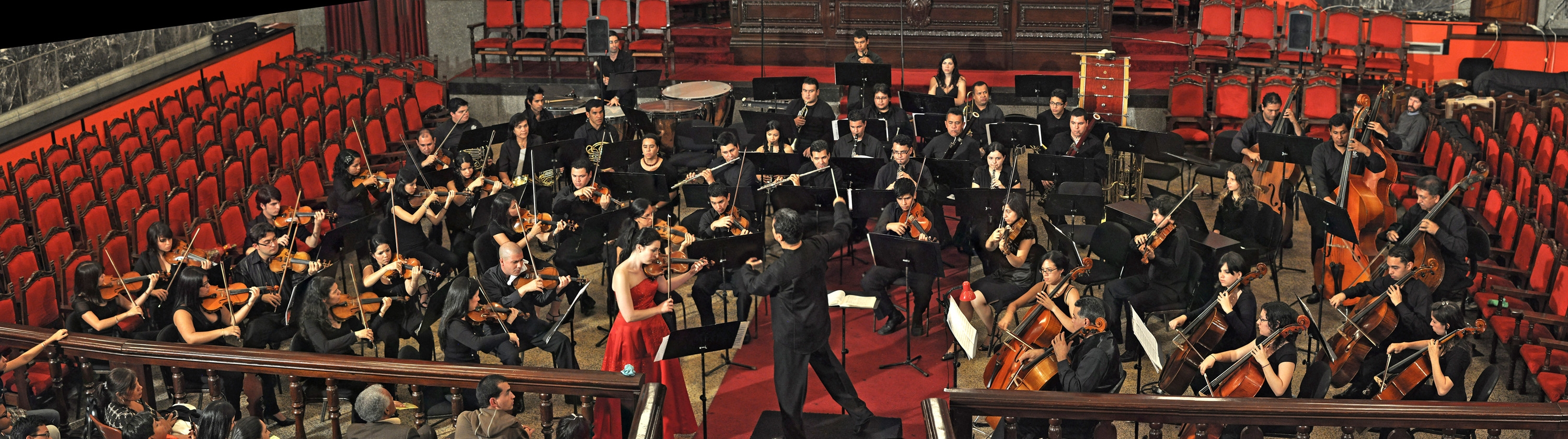
- Founded: 1991
- Principal conductor: César Iván Lara
- Website: www.osem.org.ve

The Mérida State Symphony Orchestra (Spanish: Orquesta Sinfónica del Estado Mérida or OSEM) is a symphony orchestra based in the Venezuelan city of Mérida. A non-profit organization, it was founded in 1991 by the Venezuelan pianist and educator José Antonio Abreu.

== History ==
The orchestra was established on June 21, 1991, and evolved from the Mérida State Youth Symphony Orchestra, founded in 1978 as part of the System of Youth Orchestras of Venezuela (FESNOJIV) and led by José Antonio Abreu.

Its co-founder and first artistic director was Amílcar Rivas. Between 1994 and 1997, its Music Director was Sergio Bernal who extended the orchestra's repertoire of European and Latin American symphonic music. Between 1998 and 2001, the OSEM was led by Felipe Izcaray who initiated major programs of community outreach and education which became a fundamental part of the orchestra's activities. César Iván Lara has been the orchestra's Music Director since January 2004.

In the 2006 season, the orchestra participated in many official events of the Mérida State Government, University of the Andes, the FESNOJIV, and various municipalities, giving 39 symphony concerts and 108 teaching and chamber concerts in 21 municipalities in the State of Mérida. In 1999 the OSEM was designated a Patrimonio Cultural del Estado Mérida (Cultural Patrimony of the State of Mérida).

The orchestra began its 20th anniversary year on January 15, 2011 with a performance of Tchaikovsky's Symphony No. 2 for the second annual Festival de Música de Mérida.

== See also ==
- Venezuelan music
