= Jacques Braunstein =

- Born: August 30, 1931; Bucharest, Romania
- Died: November 27, 2009 (aged 78); Caracas, Venezuela
- Citizenship: Venezuelan
- Occupations: Economist, Publicist and Jazz disc jockey

Jacques Braunstein (August 30, 1931 – November 27, 2009) was a Venezuelan musician, economist, publicist and disc jockey.

A native of Bucharest, Romania, Braunstein studied violin at age six and later, at age thirteen, took up the double bass. Raised in a Jewish home, he moved to Brazil with his family before settling in Caracas, Venezuela in the early 1950s, becoming a Venezuelan citizen in 1955. Fluent in English, French, Italian, Portuguese, and Spanish, he studied at the Harvard University and the Massachusetts Institute of Technology, where he earned two post-graduate degrees in economics and chemical industry.

In his new home Braunstein, along with his father, founded the firm Braunstein Asociados, an advertising agency which lasted for more than five decades. He was a jazz collector and a bridge whist player, and taught marketing techniques at universities throughout Venezuela. He was recognized as an international ambassador for jazz and its promotion as an art form.

Since arriving to Venezuela, Braunstein became an active participant in the local jazz community for most of his life, as founder of his radio show Idioma del Jazz in 1955 and the Caracas Jazz Club in 1956. On August 12 of this year, he promoted the first official jazz concert in Venezuela at Caracas National Theater inviting the clarinetist and saxophonist John LaPorta, who was backed by the Casablanca Orchestra, Charlie Nagy, Werner Boehm, Walter Albrecht, among others during his stay in Caracas. While a selection of the repertoire performed at the concert was released under the title South American Brothers by Fantasy Records, the first jazz recording in Venezuela.

In 1966 coined the term "Onda Nueva" after having been shown a copy of Aldemaro Romero's earliest composition called "Araguita", (originally to be used as jingle material), which Braunstein described as "something of a new wave". Onda Nueva music was heralded as the Venezuelan Bossa Nova with a very particular seal.

Since then, Braunstein gained quite a reputation over the years for coming up by organizing concerts with notables jazz groups led by Nat Adderley, Monty Alexander, Jeff Berlin, Eddie Bert, Randy Brecker, Louis Armstrong, Gary Burton, Charlie Byrd, Chick Corea, Paco de Lucía, Paquito D'Rivera, Bill Evans, Maynard Ferguson, Dizzy Gillespie, Winton Marsalis, Woody Herman, Barney Kessel, Tito Puente, Miroslav Vitouš and Paul Winter, among others.

For many years, Braunstein also worked as a foreign correspondent for magazines as Billboard, Down Beat and Paris Match. He also was honored by the U. S. Embassy in Venezuela on the 50th anniversary of his weekly jazz radio show, in virtue of his public profile, his love of jazz, and his becoming an ambassador of good will for the radio listeners during more than 2500 continuous editions from 1955 through 2005.

As Braunstein said in his own words, Paz y Jazz, he devoted a significant part of his life to studying comparative jazz styles and techniques, motivating his audiences at Idioma del Jazz, which lasted 54 years, until a few days before his death in Caracas, at the age of 78, after suffering a heart failure.

== Sources ==
- Enciclopedia de la Música en Venezuela – Directores José Peñín y Walter Guido, Tomo 1, pag. 220. Publisher: Fundación Bigott, Caracas, 1998. Language: Spanish. ISBN 980-6428-03-X
- En idioma de jazz: memorias provisorias de Jacques Braunstein – Jacqueline Goldberg. Publisher: Fundación para la Cultura Urbana, Caracas, 2004. Language: Spanish. ISBN 980-6553-15-2
- My Sax Life: A Memoir – Paquito D'Rivera, Ilan Stavans, pag. 125. Publisher: Northwestern University Press, United States, 2005. Language: English. ISBN 0-8101-2218-9
- The guitar in Venezuela: a concise history to the end of the 20th century – Alejandro Bruzual, Anna Moorby, pag. 135. Publisher: Doberman-Yppan, 2005. Language: English. ISBN 2-89503-300-5
