= Eneas Perdomo =

Venezuelan musician (1930–2011)

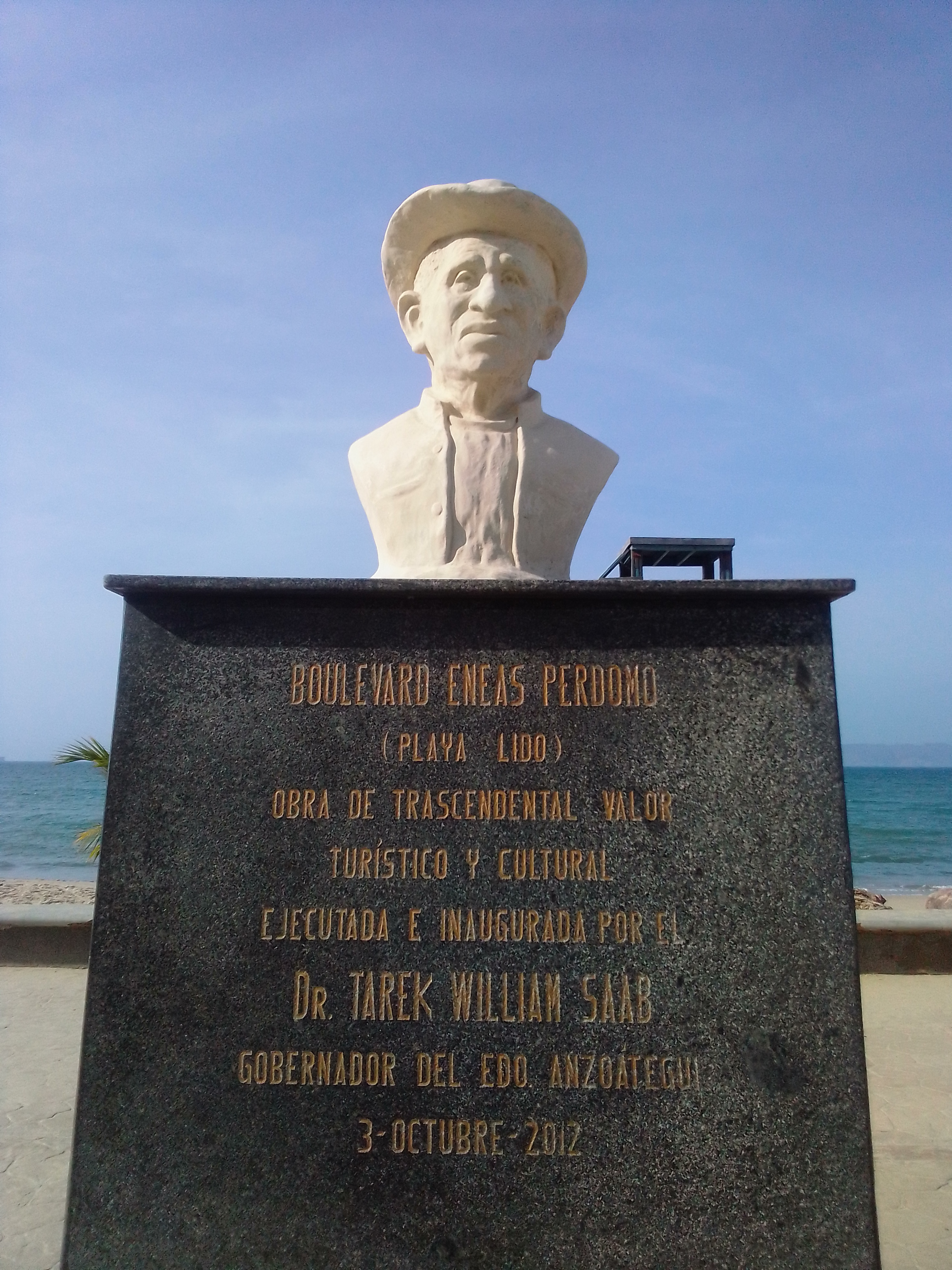
- Born: July 11, 1930; El Yagual, Apure, Venezuela
- Died: February 25, 2011 (aged 80); Caracas, Venezuela

Eneas Perdomo (July 11, 1930 – February 25, 2011) was a Venezuelan singer and composer of música llanera.

== Early years ==
Eneas Perdomo was born El Yagual, a town in the state of Apure, in Venezuela in 1930. His parents were Vicente Perdomo and Rosa Carrillo. As a youngster, he worked in the typical occupations of a man from the Venezuelan plains: cow herdsman, farm hand and truck driver.

== Main body of work ==
He got his start in radio in the state of Guárico. His first recording, made in the late 1950s, was a poem by Cesar Sánchez Olivo entitled Soga, Despecho y Alero. He went on to record more than 40 LPs and wrote many songs which have become Joropo standards. His best known song is Fiesta en Elorza a celebration of the festivities of the town of Elorza in the state of Apure.

He received a lot of honors (more than 200), among them the Orden del Libertador, Orden Ricardo Montilla, Orden Emilio Sojo, Orden Sol Del Perú. He had a plaza dedicated to him, and a street named after him by the town of Elorza, who named him Illustrious Son.

== Death ==
Eneas Perdomo died at the Military Hospital located in the city of Caracas, after a long illness.

== Selected Compositions ==
- A Barinas
- El Regional
- El Verdun
- Fiesta en Elorza
- Flor Sabanera
- La gaviota
- Lia
- Paisaje Apureño
- Periquera
- Pescador del Río Apure
- Puente Sobre Apure
- Recuerdos Llaneras
- Sabanas de Aráuca
- Sabanera
- Semana Santa en Achaguas
- Vestida de Garza Blanca / Alcaraván Compañero

== See also ==
- Music of Venezuela
