= Adilia Castillo =

Venezuelan actress, composer and singer

- Born: August 26, 1933; Apureña de El Yagual, Venezuela
- Died: March 7, 2014 (aged 80); Caracas, Venezuela
- Other name: La Novia del Llano (The Bride of the Plains)
- Occupations: Singer, actress
- Years active: 1950 — 2014

Adilia Castillo (August 26, 1933 – March 7, 2014) was a Venezuelan actress and singer, specialized in the genre of música llanera, the folk music of the plains of Venezuela.

== Discography ==
Side 1

- Mi Recuerdo - Pasaje - Adila Castillo
- Nuestro Amor - Pasaje - Adilia Castillo
- Instrumenatal - Pasaje - Foklore Venezolano
- Flora Sabanera - Pasaje - Jose Romero
- Amor Inutile - Isabelita Sanchez
- Llano Adentro - Jose Romero

Side 2

- Lejos de Tre - Pasaje - M. Adilia Castillo, L.V.Caruci
- Mi Lamento - Pasaje - Adilai Castillo
- Instrumental - M. Jose Romero
- Saucelito - Pasaje - Folklore Veneolano
- Morena Linda - Adilia Castillo
- El Lanero - M. Anonimo L. Cosme Carvajal
- Pressed for "Comercial Llanero" Palmaa Miracielos 55 - Caracas
