= Maurice Hasson =

French-Venezuelan violinist (1934–2026)

Maurice Hasson (6 July 1934 – 7 November 2026) was a French-Venezuelan violinist.

== Life and career ==
Hasson studied at the Paris Conservatoire with Line Talluel and Joseph Calvet, winning a First Prize for Violin, "Grand Prix" for chamber music, and the first "Prix d'Honneur" Prize awarded in 60 years. He was a laureate of the Thibaud Violin Competition 1953, where he met Henryk Szeryng, who would become his teacher for many years. He emigrated with his first wife, pianist Monique Duphil, and their two daughters to Venezuela from 1960 to 1973.

Upon his move to London in 1973, he made his debut at the Royal Albert Hall Promenade Concerts, playing Paganini Concerto No. 1 and his USA debut with the Cleveland Orchestra conducted by Lorin Maazel in 1978. He has since performed with virtually all the major orchestras in Europe, Israel and the United States under the baton of Sir Colin Davis, Yehudi Menuhin, Kurt Masur, Eliahu Inbal, David Zinman, Sir Simon Rattle, Sir Andrew Davis and Gustavo Dudamel to name only a few. In 1976, he recorded the Bach Double Concerto with Szeryng and the Academy of St. Martin's in the Fields, directed by Sir Neville Marriner.

The violin concerto by Castellanos Yumar was dedicated to Hasson.

He was awarded the Medaille de Vermeil from the city of Paris, and refused honours from the Venezuelan government. Hasson owned the 1727 'Benvenuti, Halphen' Stradivarius until 2005.

Hasson resided in London with his second wife, Janet Hoogesteijn, with whom he had two children and five grandchildren, and held a professorship of violin at the Royal Academy of Music from 1986 to 2015.

Hasson died on 7 November 2026, at the age of 92.
