= Lloviznando Cantos =

Venezuela-based artists collective

Lloviznando Cantos is a Venezuela-based artists collective founded in 2001. The collective is a contemporary heir to the historical traditions of the Nueva Canción movement of the 1960s and 1970s. Their stated reason for being is to consolidate and bring to the masses political and social message of solidarity as conceived in the "socialist revolution" promoted by former Venezuelan president Hugo Rafael Chávez Frías.

The collective has played in places such as Chile, Argentina, Uruguay, Bolivia, Ecuador, Panama, Nicaragua, Guatemala, El Salvador, as well as in Europe.

As heirs of the Nueva Canción movement, they are performing what they call the "Canción Socialista" (Socialist Song).
