= Ignacio Figueredo =

Background information
- Also known as: El Indio Figueredo
- Born: July 31, 1899; Algarrobito, Apure, Venezuela
- Died: September 3, 1995 (aged 96) San Fernando de Apure, Apure, Venezuela
- Genres: Joropo
- Occupations: musician, harpist, composer
- Instrument: Llanera Harp

Ignacio Ventura Figueredo (July 31, 1899, in Algarrobito, Apure – September 3, 1995, in San Fernando de Apure), was a Venezuelan folk musician and harpist.

== See also ==
- International Jose Guillermo Carrillo Foundation
- Venezuela
- Venezuelan music
