= José Catire Carpio =

Venezuelan singer

José Catire Carpio

José Catire Carpio, (born José Algimiro Carpio Velásquez; December 19, 1940 – June 26, 2006), born in Guárico State to Venezuela, was a Venezuelan llanera music singer.

== See also ==
- Joropo
- Venezuela
- Venezuelan music
