= Carota, Ñema y Tajá =

Carota, Ñema y Tajá is a Venezuelan folkloric musical group founded in 1981 in Lara state by singer and composer Adelis Fréitez. The group is recognized as a musical and cultural heritage of that state.

== History ==
The group was founded in Lara, Venezuela, on March 3, 1981, with Adelis Fréitez as its main composer and lead singer. They have recorded more than 200 songs and 17 albums.

In 2020, Adelis Fréitez died. In 2022, the group was recognized as a musical and cultural heritage of Lara; that same year, they embarked on a national and international tour, participating in the Sonamos Latinoamérica festival in Argentina. In 2023, the group made its first tour of the United States, the same year in which Luis Hernández Guareque died.

== Members ==
- Adelis Fréitez (1981–2020)
- Luis Hernández Guareque
