= Bigott Foundation =

Private institution in Caracas, Venezuela

Fundación Bigott
- Logo of the Fundación Bigott
- Company type: Cultural
- Industry: Promotion, development and encouragement of traditional Venezuelan culture in all its aspects
- Founded: 1963
- Headquarters: Caracas, Venezuela
- Products: CDs, magazines, books, promotion of the Venezuelan culture
- Revenue: non-profit
- Number of employees: non-profit
- Website: Fundación Bigott official site

Bigott Foundation (Spanish: Fundación Bigott) is a private institution in Caracas, Venezuela; it is dedicated to "preserving and making known the values of traditional culture".

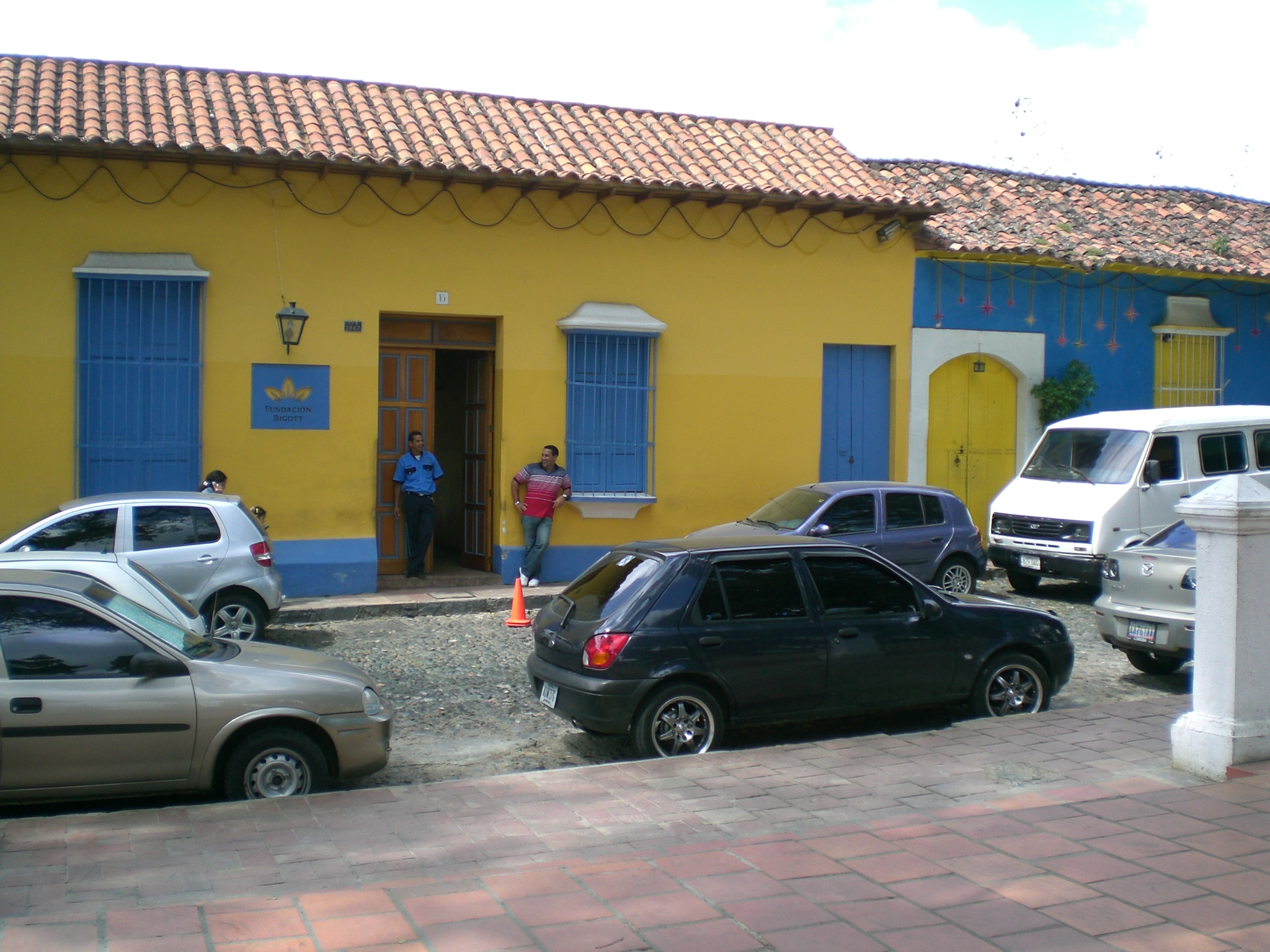
Bigott Foundation House, Petare, Caracas

== See also ==
- British American Tobacco
