= Juan Vicente Torrealba =

Venezuelan harpist and composer (1917–2019)

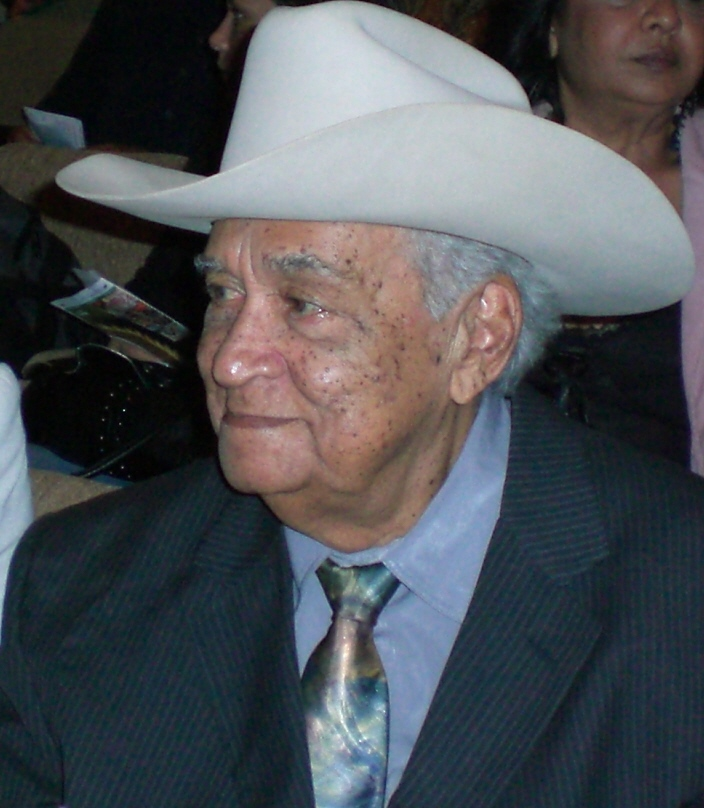

Background information
- Born: 20 February 1917; Caracas, Venezuela
- Died: 2 May 2019 (aged 102) Caracas, Venezuela
- Genre: Venezuelan popular music
- Occupations: Harpist and composer
- Instrument: Llanera harp
- Formerly of: Los Torrealberos

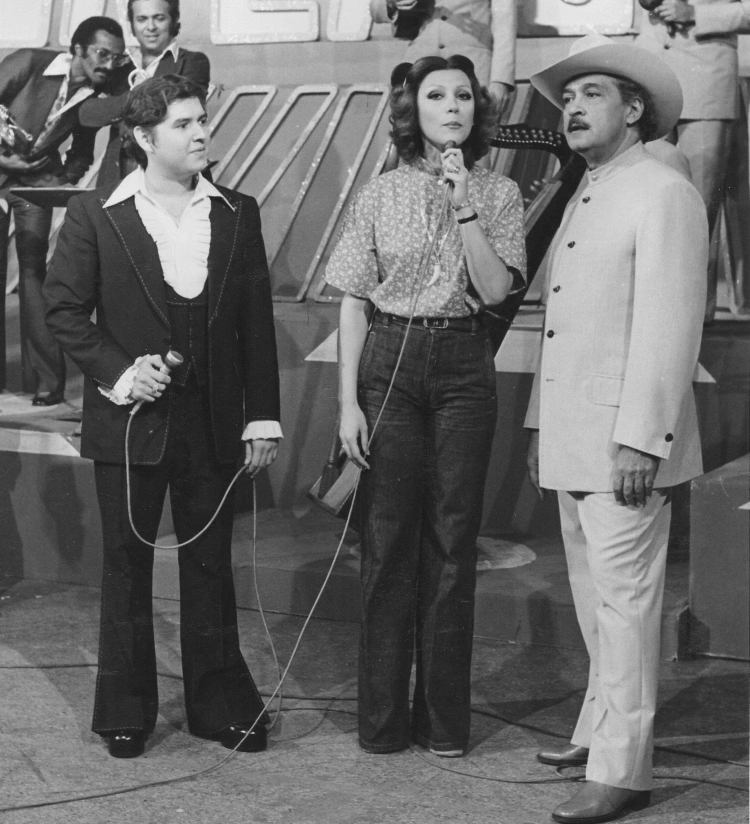
Juan Vicente Torrealba and Carmen Victoria Perez, 1975.

Juan Vicente Torrealba (20 February 1917 – 2 May 2019) was a Venezuelan harpist and composer of popular music.

== Life ==
In 1947, he founded the group Los Torrealberos with his brother Arturo and his son Santana, playing with passion and rich nuances the traditional music of the plains, which is distinguished by feeding on the experiences of the peasants, the cattle-raising tasks, the singing of the birds, the melody of the rivers and the trot of the horses. The following year he launched his solo career and performed before crowds in Latin America, Europe and the United States.

In 1971, the recording of the album "Rhapsody Llanera" was key in his career, in which his group was accompanied by a symphony orchestra. Since then the incorporation of the most varied instruments and technical elements was a constant and turned his group into a kind of chamber orchestra. "La fillo zaina" – created in honor of his wife Mirta Pantoja – inspired and gave musical framework to one of the most successful telenovelas in Colombia, in 1993, written by Bernardo Romero Pereiro and starring Aura Cristina Geithner and Miguel Varoni. Torrealba recorded 130 albums and composed more than 300 songs such as "La fillo zaina" and "Solito con the stars". A centenarian, he died in May 2019 at the age of 102.
