= Rafael Suárez (composer) =

Venezuelan composer, conductor, and arranger (1929–1971)

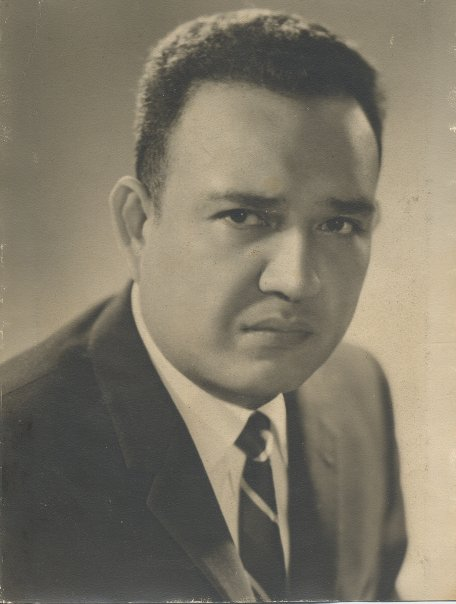
Rafael Suárez

Rafael Suárez Mujica (December 1, 1929 - September 30, 1971) was a Venezuelan composer, conductor, and arranger.

== Early life and education ==
Suárez was born in El Poblado, Isla de Margarita, Venezuela. He began his musical studies in 1945 at the Escuela Superior de Música in Caracas under the direction of Maestro Ramos and later under the direction of Maestro Vicente Emilio Sojo, until 1952. Later, he travelled to Europe to undertake advanced music studies with Maestro Dante Ullu, head of the chair of advanced score reading, composition, orchestral conducting, counterpoint, and fugue at the Academia di Santa Cecilia in Rome, Italy. He was designated as conductor of the Experimental Orchestra of the Academia di Santa Cecilia, and the "Ente Stanislao" Orchestra of Termi (Italy).

== Career ==
Returning to Venezuela, Suárez focused in choral conduction. He founded a number of choirs, including Orfeón de la Juventud Católica de la Parroquia Santa Teresa, Coral del Cuartel “Rafael Urdaneta”, Coral del Colegio de Abogados del Distrito Federal, Coral del Centro de Profesionales del Estado Aragua, and the Coral Shell, while he served as associate conductor of the Coral Venezuela.

Suárez composed a number of musical works. Many of his best known pieces were created for the Quinteto Contrapunto, a group which he founded in 1962, and for which he wrote vocal arrangements with demanding technical requirements of traditional Venezuelan folk songs. These arrangements were published by FUNVES, Instituto de Musicología. Suárez was music director and also sang in the quintet.

A summary of his work is included in the document Nine Venezuelan Composers and a Catalogue of their Choral Works, by Cristian Grases, University of Miami.

Died in Caracas, Venezuela on September 30, 1971.
