= Modesta Bor =

Venezuelan composer (1926–1998)

Modesta Bor (15 June 1926 – 7 April 1998) was a Venezuelan composer and choral arranger. Formerly a promising pianist and music interpreter, she was forced to center her career around composing and teaching after being diagnosed with Guillain-Barré syndrome in 1951.

She was a member of the Communist Party of Venezuela and the FALN.

== Life and career ==
Modesta Bor was born in Juan Griego, Margarita Island. She studied in Caracas with Elena Arrarte, Juan Bautista Plaza, Antonio Estévez, Maria de Lourdes Rotundo and Vicente Emilio Sojo, graduating with a degree in composition in 1959. She continued her studies at the Moscow Tchaikovsky Conservatory with Aram Khachaturian. In 1960 she won her first National Music Prize with Sonata for viola and piano.

After completing her studies, Bor returned to Venezuela to work as a composer, teacher and choir director, becoming head of the music department in the Central University of Venezuela Culture Department. She also served as director of the musicology section of Folklore Research of the National Service. She died in Mérida.

== Works ==
Bor composed for orchestra, chamber ensemble, piano and vocal performance, writing more than 95 choral works for mixed and 130 for equal-voice choir. Selected works include:

- Children's Suite
- Canción de cuna para dormir un negrito (in Tríptico sobre poesía cubana, for voice and piano) (Text: Nicolas Guillén)
- Coplas venezolanas (in Segundo cico de romanzas y canciones, for contralto and piano) (Text: Andrés Eloy Blanco Meaño)
- Guitarra (in Tríptico sobre poesía cubana for voice and piano) (Text: Nicolas Guillén)
- Nocturno en los muellas (in Tríptico sobre poesía cubana for voice and piano) (Text: Nicolas Guillén)
- Pregón (in Segundo ciclo de romanzas y canciones for contralto and piano) (Text: Andrés Eloy Blanco Meaño)
- Si el silencio fuera mío (in Segundo ciclo de romanzas y canciones for contralto and piano) (Text: Andrés Eloy Blanco Meaño)
- Suspiro cuando te miro (in Segundo ciclo de romanzas y canciones for contralto and piano) (Text: Andrés Eloy Blanco Meaño)
