= El Carrao de Palmarito =

Venezuelan singer (1928–2002)

- Also known as: El Carrao de Palmarito; Clarín de la Llanura
- Born: Juan de los Santos Contreras; April 7, 1928; Palmarito (Apure), Apure state, Venezuela
- Died: December 10, 2002 (aged 74) Barinas, Barinas state, Venezuela
- Genres: música llanera
- Occupations: singer, composer
- Labels: Velvet; Discomoda; Cahilapo

Juan de los Santos Contreras; April 7, 1928 – December 10, 2002), was a Venezuelan singer and composer of música llanera. He was better known by his stage name El Carrao de Palmarito which identified him as the "limpkin" (a bird with a piercing call; Spanish: Carrao, Latin: Aramus guarauna) of Palmarito, his hometown.

== Career ==
He became well known in the 1950s, making radio broadcasts and releasing his first disc on the Velvet label. His most famous songs include the duet Florentino y el Diablo (based on the poema by Alberto Arvelo Torrealba), Aquella mujer que amé, Furia, Chaparralito llanero, Cajón del Arauca apureño, Llanura yo soy tu hijo, Plegaria llanera, Travesía de San Camilo, Faenas del llano, Dulce María, Mis retoños, El morrocoy de doña Carmen, Caminito de Arichuna, Recorriendo a Barinas, Los martirios del Carrao, El sueño de Julio Verne, Villavicencio. Contreras received many awards, including Venezuela's National Prize of Popular Culture in 1998.
