= Antonio Estévez =

Background information
- Born: January 3, 1916; Calabozo, Guárico, Venezuela
- Died: November 26, 1988 (aged 72) Caracas, Venezuela
- Genres: Classical
- Occupations: conductor and composer
- Instrument: Oboe
- Formerly of: Caracas Martial Band; Venezuela Symphony Orchestra; Central University of Venezuela Choral

Antonio José Estévez Aponte (January 3, 1916 – November 26, 1988), was a Venezuelan musician, composer and conductor who was born in Calabozo and died in Caracas.

He founded the Central University of Venezuela's Chorus.

== Compositions ==
His best known work is the Cantata Criolla, released on July 25, 1954, winning the National Music Award and perhaps the most important Venezuelan nationalist work of the 20th century. Other well-known works are Mediodía en el Llano, Cromovibrafonía and Cromovibrafonía multiple that were composed for the exhibition of works of Soto in Montreal and the Museum of Modern Art of Ciudad Bolívar.

Mediodía en el Llano was born in the year 1942. While still a student in the sixth year of composition, Vicente Emilio Sojo commissioned an orchestral suite from him. Estevez responded with his Suite Llanera. It was with this composition that Estévez premiered as conductor in the same year. Originally the suite had three parts: Dawn, Noon and Sunset, taking advantage of the occasion to try to describe in an impressionistic way those three events. Later Estevez removed the outer movements leaving only the central part, which today is the symphonic poem Mediodía in the Llano.
