= Moisés Moleiro =

Venezuelan musician

- Born: March 28, 1904; Zaraza, Guárico, Venezuela
- Died: June 18, 1979 (aged 75); Caracas, Venezuela

Moisés Moleiro (28 March 1904 – 18 June 1979) was a Venezuelan pianist and composer.

== Biography ==
He was born in 1904 and studied under Salvador Llamozas. Moleiro founded the Orfeón Lamas and taught piano at the Caracas Musical Declamation Academy (today the Escuela de Música José Ángel Lamas). His works have been performed in the United States, Europe, and across Latin America. One of his most popular compositions is the Joropo, a piano take on Venezuela's folkloric music.

He died in 1979.

Moleiro had 3 children, Moises Moleiro was a historian and politician, while his other 2 children, Federico was a poet and Carmencita became a pianist.

== Selected works ==
- Danza Salvaje
- Endecha
- Estampas del Llano
- La Fuente
- Sonatina en La menor
- Tocata en Do # menor
- Tocata en Do mayor
- Joropo
- Canción De Cuna
- Rondó, de la Sonata al estilo clásico
- En El Parque
- El Bosque
- Romance
- Tonada
- Otoño
