= Venezuela Symphony Orchestra =

International Classical Orchestra

- Orchestra
- official logo
- Founded: 1930
- Location: Caracas, Venezuela
- Website: www.osv.org.ve

The Venezuela Symphony Orchestra (Spanish: Orquesta Sinfónica de Venezuela) is an orchestra in Venezuela, founded in 1930. They perform at the Ríos Reyna concert-hall in the Teresa Carreño Cultural Complex.

== See also ==
- Venezuelan music
