= Vicente Emilio Sojo =

Venezuelan musicologist, educator and composer (1887–1974)

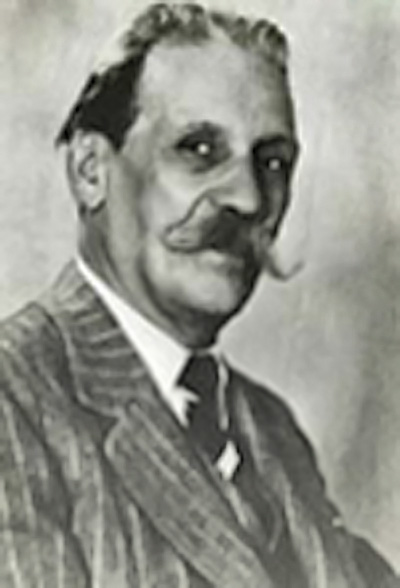

Background information
- Born: December 8, 1887; Guatire, Guzman Blanco State, Venezuela
- Died: August 11, 1974 (aged 86) Caracas, Federal District, Venezuela
- Genre: Classical
- Occupations: Musicologist, educator, conductor and composer
- Formerly of: Venezuela Symphony Orchestra, Orfeón Lamas

Vicente Emilio Sojo (December 8, 1887 – August 11, 1974) was a Venezuelan musicologist, educator and composer, born in Guatire, Miranda.

== Biography ==
Vicente Emilio Sojo was born to a musical family. Most notable was that both his great-grandfathers were Chapel Masters. In 1896 he began musical studies under professor Régulo Rico. In 1906 he moved to Caracas, where in 1910 he entered the School of Music and Declamation, while simultaneously continuing his self-taught studies in humanities; in this period he began composing his first musical works. In 1921 he was appointed Music Professor in the School of Music and Declamation. He kept on composing works of diverse sorts for different instrumental and vocal combinations. In 1928, in the occasion of the foundation of the Orfeón Lamas, he wrote his first polyphonic opus.

In 1930 he already was Conductor of the Orfeón Lamas and had founded the Venezuela Symphony Orchestra, of which he was not only conductor-founder, but a resolute and constant driving force. In 1940, together with other composers he prepared the first song book for Venezuelan children. In 1944, the first promotion of composers graduated under Sojo in the José Ángel Lamas school of music.

Maestro Sojo also involved himself in domestic politics: he was one of the founders of the Accion Democratica Party (AD) in 1941. In 1958 was elected senator of the Republic by the Miranda state and was re-elected in 1963.

Vicente Emilio Sojo can be regarded as one of the main creators of the modern school of Venezuelan music. For the Orfeón Lamas, he compiled and he harmonized more than 200 songs of popular and national folklore, achieving a significant rescue of the Venezuelan musical tradition of the last centuries. Among his most important works are: Chromatic Mass (1922–1933) and Hodie Super Nos Fulgebit Lux (1935). In 1951 was granted the National Music award as recognition for his work.

Sojo's pupils include Alba Quintanilla and Ana Rugeles.

== Works ==
Orfeón Lamas directed by Vicente Emilio Sojo

Vicente Emilio Sojo and Orfeón Lamas singing aguinaldos in the basilic of Santa Teresa, Caracas

- 1911 Himno a Bolívar
- 1912 Romanza sin palabras
- 1913 Cuarteto en Re, for strings
- 1914 Partitura para festiva
- 1914 Tres motetes para la iglesia Santa Capilla
- 1915 Misa Coral
- 1918 Salve Reina
- 1920 Obertura Treno
- 1922 Ave María
- 1923 Misa Cromática
- 1924 Ocho responsorias y un Te Deum
- 1925 Palabras de Cristo en el Calvario
- 1926–1927 27 canciones de ayer
- 1928 Por la Cabra Rubia
- 1929 Requiem Inmemorian Patris Patriae
- 1930–1933 Misa Breve
- 1935 Misa a capella en honor a Santa Efigenia y a su fallecida esposa,La Noche, La Carretera, Rondel Matinal and Hondie nos Fulgebit Lux
- 1939 Tres canciones infantiles
- 1952 Tres piezas para guitarras
- 1953 Misa para Santa Cecilia
- 1958 10 canciones infantiles venezolanas
- 1964–1969 9 Canciones infantiles

== Bibliography ==
- Oscar Mago: Sojo, un hombre y una misión histórica Type: Spanish : Book Publisher: Caracas : Ediciones de la Orquesta Sinfónica de Venezuela, 1975. OCLC: 13353468

== See also ==
- Music of Venezuela
