= List of South American folk music traditions =

This is a list of folk music traditions, with styles, dances, instruments and other related topics. The term folk music can not be easily defined in a precise manner; it is used with widely varying definitions depending on the author, intended audience and context within a work. Similarly, the term traditions in this context does not connote any strictly defined criteria. Music scholars, journalists, audiences, record industry individuals, politicians, nationalists and demagogues may often have occasion to address which fields of folk music are distinct traditions based along racial, geographic, linguistic, religious, tribal or ethnic lines, and all such peoples will likely use different criteria to decide what constitutes a "folk music tradition". This list uses the same general categories used by mainstream, primarily English-language, scholarly sources, as determined by relevant statements of fact and the internal structure of works.

These traditions may coincide entirely, partially or not at all with geographic, political, linguistic or cultural boundaries. Very few, if any, music scholars would claim that there are any folk music traditions that can be considered specific to a distinct group of people and with characteristics undiluted by contact with the music of other peoples; thus, the folk music traditions described herein overlap in varying degrees with each other.

Country	Elements	Dance	Instrumentation	Other topics
Afro-Colombian	champeta	contradanza; currulao; mazurka; polka	drum; marimba; shaker	
Argentina	baguala; chamamé; cifra; folklorica; milonga; payada; tango; tonada; tunga-tunga; vidala; zamba	bataclán; chamamé; chacarera; chaya; cuarteto; cueca; gato; malambo; milonga; tango; zamba	accordion; bandoneón; flute; guitar; guitarrón; harp; piano; violin	candombe; compadrito; lunfardo
Aymara			bombo; cajas; charango; pinkillu; pitu; qina; siku; tarka; wankara	
Bolivia	taquirari; Tinku; diablada; saya	bailecito; cueca; huayñitos		
Brazil	boi; Capoeira song; choro; frevo; literatura de cordel; maracatu; modinha; repentismo; samba	baião; batuque; bloco; Capoeira; carimbó; cururu; xote; vanerão fandango; forró; jongo; kankuku; lundu; maxixe; modinha; muñeres; samba; xango	agogô; atabaque; berimbau; cavaquinho; clarinet; cuíca; pandeiros; piano; reco-recos; sanfona; surdos; tamborim; triangle; viola; violão	Candomblé; Carnival; escolas de samba
Chile		chocolate; cueca; periconas; sirillas; tras trasera; valses chilotes zamacueca	guitar; Chilean guitarrón; harp; tambourine; hand-clapping	
Colombia	cumbia; bullerengue; cumbiamba; puya; lumbalú; mapalé; paseo; porro; tambora; son palenquero; puya vallenata; son vallenato; merengue vallenato; paseo vallenato; bambuco; pasillo; vals; danza; rajaleña; rumba campesina; guabina; sanjuanero; torbellino; currulao; juga; makerulle; porro chocoano; contradanza; andarele; aguabajo; tonada; pasaje; contrapunteo; copla; golpe; pajarillo; llanera; corrido; galerón; joropo; mento; calypso; reggae	bambuco; sanjuanero; cumbia; currulao; joropo; porro	accordion; bandola; bandolin; bass drum; bombardino; bombo; caja; capacho; carrizo; clarinet; cuatro; cymbal; flauto de millo; gaita; guacharaca; guache; guachos; harp; marimba; marimbula; pito; saxophone; snare drum; tambor hembra; tambor macho; tambora; tiple; trumpet; tuba	
Ecuador	albazo; pasillo; pasacalle; tonada; yarawi; vals; currulao; andarele; bomba del chota; capishka	currulao	bombo; marimba; panpipe; rondador; pinkillu; bomba; requinto	
Andean	wayñu; marinera; rasgueado; vals criollo; yaraví; carnavalito	punchay kashwa; ayñu; incaico; sayas	Andean harp; cajón; charango; guitarra; mandolin; panpipe; qina; tinya; vihuela; violin	Indigenismo; payadore
Kallawaya	k'antu		arca; ira; ch'inisku; wankara; zampona	
Peru		alcatraz; festejo; landó; marinera; tondero; vals	cajón; guitar; bass; bugle	
Quechua	sanjuan; vacación	ayñu; sanjuan	antara; charango; harp; qina; violin; guitar; drum	golpeador; matrimonio; misai; wawa velorio
Sirionó			None	
Suyá	akía		rattle	
Uruguay	candombe; milongón; murga; chamarrita; tango; serranera	candombe; uruguayan polka; pericón; tango; chotis; gato	piano (drum); chico; repique; uruguayan guitarrón; bass drum; snare drum; cymbals; acoustic guitar; accordion	Carnival; party; tradition; llamadas; tamboriles; rural tasks; nostalgia; romanticism
Venezuela	Calypso de El Callao; Fulía; gaita; llanera; parranda; sangeo; aguinaldo; Galerón; Malagueña; Punto; Venezuelan bambuco; Venezuelan work songs	joropo; merengue; polo; tamunangue; Venezuelan waltz; Venezuelan polka	culoepuya; cuatro; furruco; harp; mandolin; maraca; mina; quitiplas; tambor; bandola	Dancing Devils of Yare; Llanero
Paraguay	guaranía; Paraguayan polka; Chamamé	Paraguayan polka	harp; Guitar; Accordion	

== Sources ==
- Broughton, Simon; Mark Ellingham (2000). Rough Guide to World Music (First ed.). London: Rough Guides. ISBN 1-85828-636-0.
- Lankford, Ronald D. Jr. (2005). The Changing Voice Music of Protest USA. New York: Schirmer Trade Books. ISBN 0-8256-7300-3.
- Philip V. Bohlman; Bruno Nettl; Charles Capwell; Thomas Turino; Isabel K. F. Wong (1997). Excursions in World Music (Second ed.). Prentice Hall. ISBN 0-13-230632-8.
- Nettl, Bruno (1965). Folk and Traditional Music of the Western Continents. Englewood Cliffs, New Jersey: Prentice Hall.
- Fujie, Linda; James T. Koetting; David P. McAllester; David Reck; John M. Schechter; Mark Slobin; R. Anderson Sutton (1992). Jeff Todd Titan (ed.). Worlds of Music: An Introduction to the Music of the World's Peoples (Second ed.). New York: Schirmer Books. ISBN 0-02-872602-2.
- van der Merwe, Peter (1989). Origins of the Popular Style: The Antecedents of Twentieth-Century Popular Music. Oxford: Clarendon Press. ISBN 0-19-316121-4.
- "International Dance Glossary". World Music Central. Archived from the original on February 7, 2006.
