= Hacienda El Tanque =

Coordinates: 11.10670°N 63.901052°W

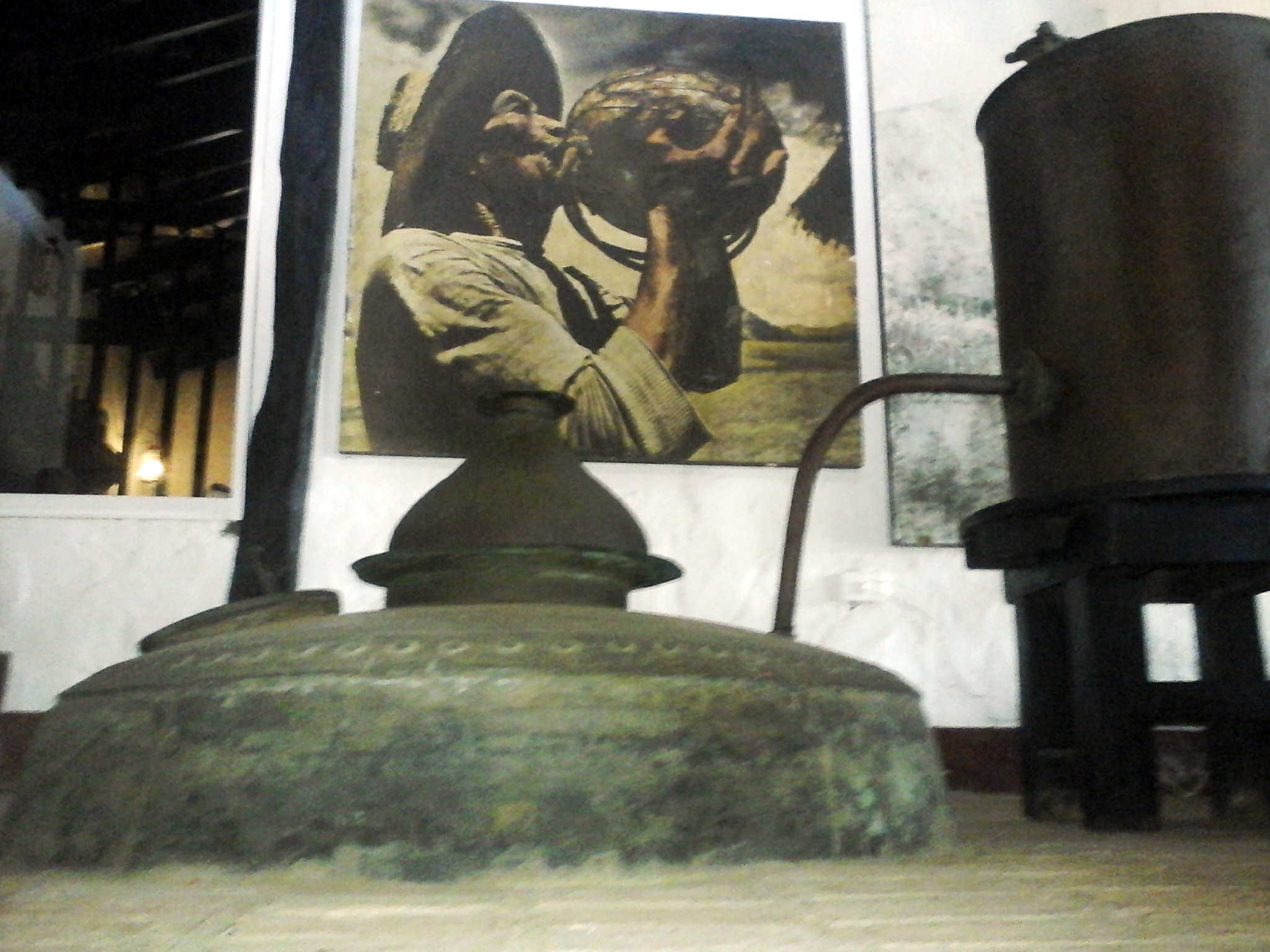
Interior of the hacienda.

The Hacienda El Tanque is an hacienda and historical alembic for the distillation of aguardiente and rum in the valley of Pedro González, Margarita Island, Venezuela. It was founded in 1880, and still conserves the covered alembic and the original architecture of the period. It's listed by the historian Luis Marcano Boada, chronicler of La Asuncion, as one of the 25 original distilleries of aguardiente in Margarita, which included the Distillery Altagracia, La Estancia, Cruz Grande, among others.

== Location ==
The hacienda is located in a highly fertile and water-rich area of the island in the Valley of Pedro González, with a clear water spring that flows from the mountain range which includes to Cerro Tragaplata, and gives rise to crops of tomato margariteño and chili margariteño, which is currently being proposed as worthy of obtaining a denomination of origin.

== Cultural tradition ==
Among others, the hacienda has been throughout the years a place of meeting for Venezuelan oriental musicians, especially in the 1990s. In it, several celebrations of galerones, velorios of Cruz de Mayo and homages to the Virgen del Valle (Virgin of the Valley), by recognised interpretes of the oriental Venezuelan music or 'música margariteña', such as one of the main composers and cuatristas of the folklore of Margarita, José Ramón Villaroel, "The Hurricane of the Caribbean".

== See also ==
- Margarita Island
- Estado Nueva Esparta
