= Alconchel de la Estrella =

Human settlement in Cuenca Province, Castile-La Mancha, Spain

- Municipality
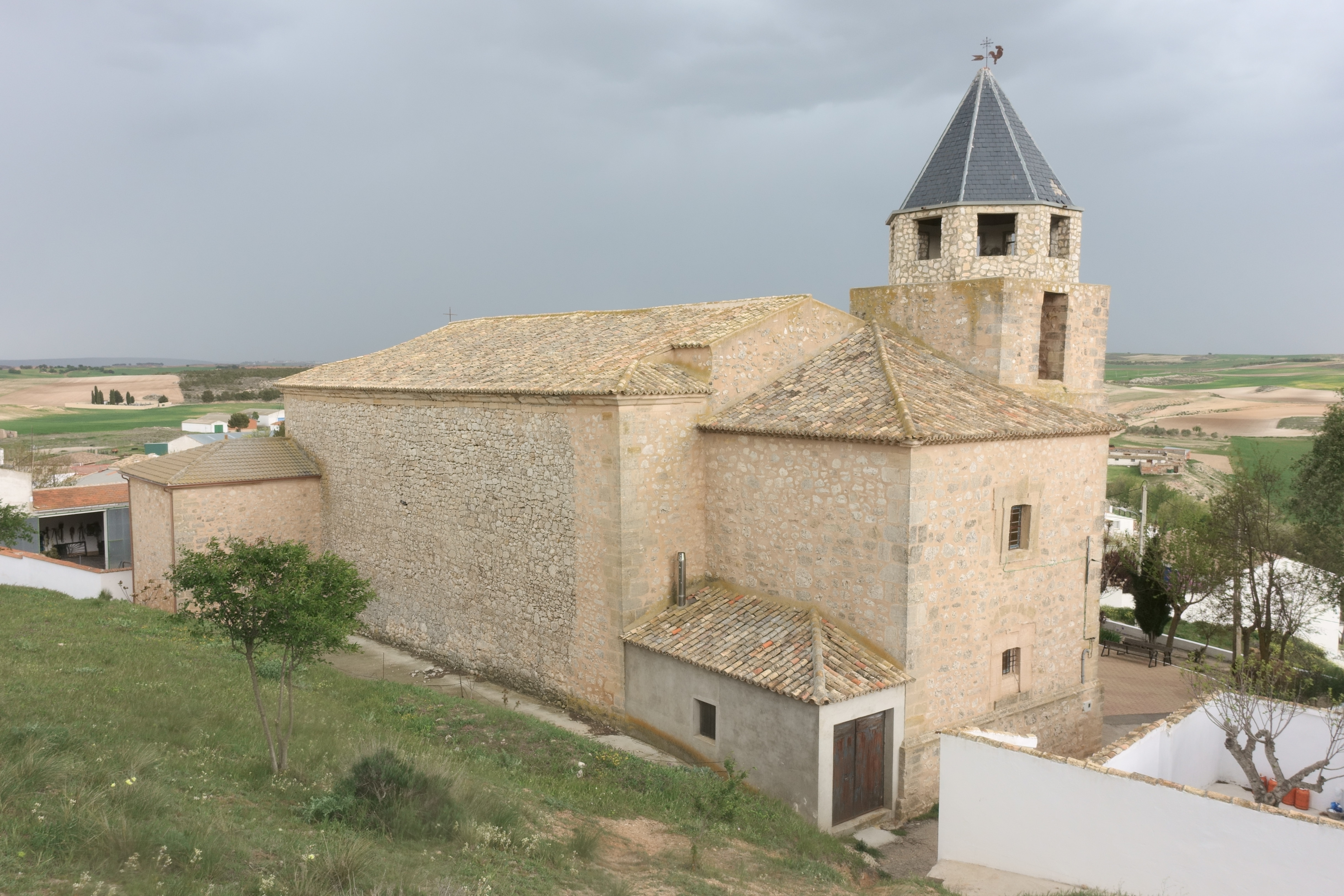

- Location within Spain Location within Castilla-La Mancha
- Coordinates: 39°43′N 2°34′W
- Country: Spain
- Autonomous community: Castile-La Mancha
- Province: Cuenca

Population (2025-01-01)
  - Total: 75
- Time zone: UTC+1 (CET)
  - Summer (DST): UTC+2 (CEST)

Alconchel de la Estrella is a municipality in Cuenca, Castile-La Mancha, Spain.

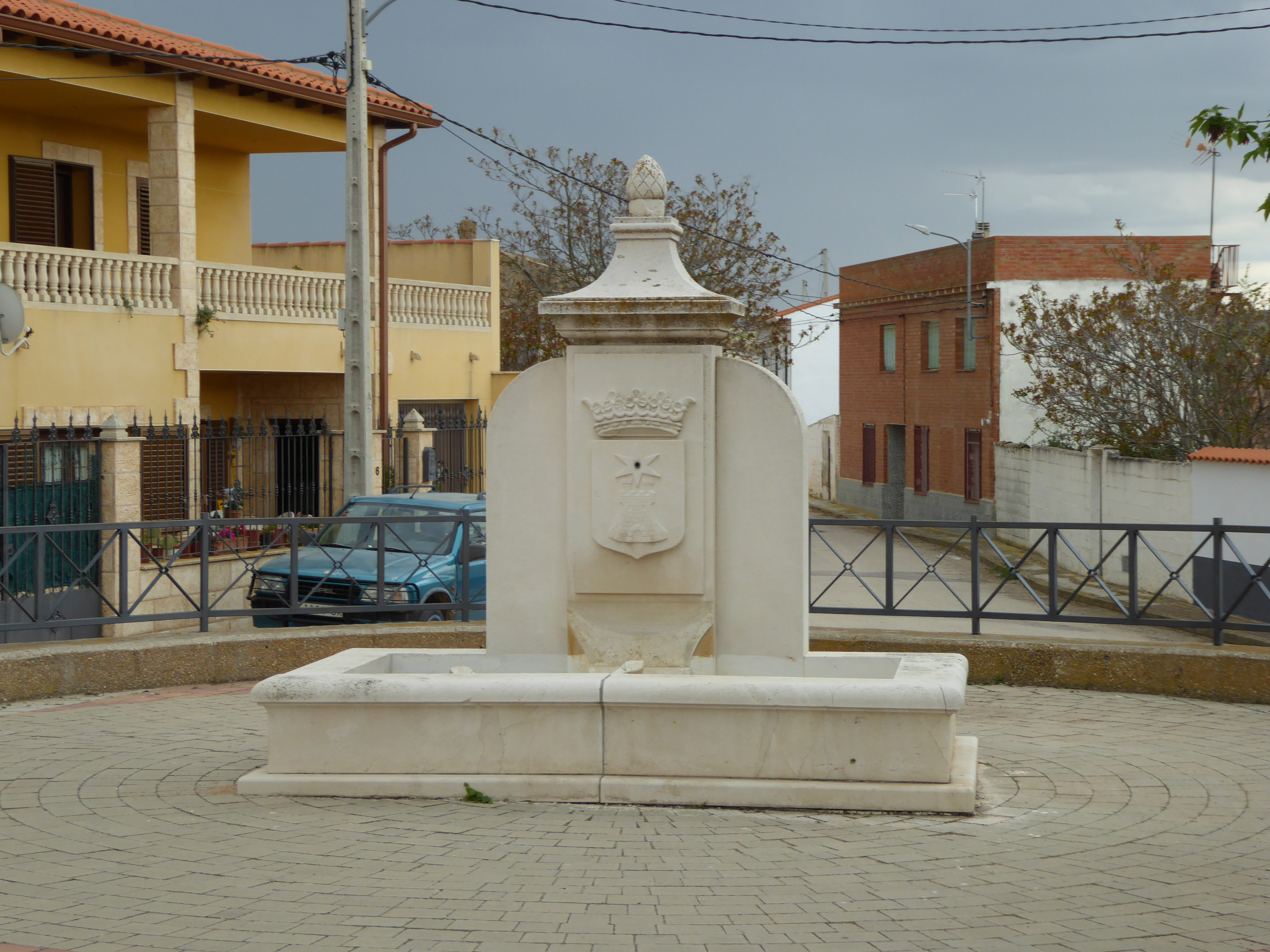

== Population ==
Alconchel de la Estrella has a population of 88 inhabitants, of which 51 are male and 37 are female.

== Geography ==
Alconchel de la Estrella is located in the province of Cuenca, which is located in the autonomous region of Castile-La Mancha. It is located 6 km (3.7 mi) from Montalbanejo, 7 (4.3) from Villalgordo del Marquesado, and 82 (51) from Cuenca proper.

== Administration ==
| Term | Name | Party |
|---|---|---|
| 1979-1983 | Manuel Castaño Saiz | UCD |
| 1983-1987 | Manuel Castaño Saiz | |
| 1987-1991 | Manuel Castaño Saiz | |
| 1991-1995 | Manuel Castaño Saiz | |
| 1995-1999 | Manuel Castaño Saiz | |
| 1999-2003 | Primitivo Rodríguez Valencia | PP |
| 2003-2007 | Primitivo Rodríguez Valencia | PP |
| 2007-2011 | Primitivo Rodríguez Valencia | PP |
| 2011-2015 | Tomás Borona Arévalo | PSOE |
| 2015-2019 | Tomás Borona Arévalo | PSOE |
| 2019- | Tomás Borona Arévalo | PSOE |
