= Fiesta de las Cruces =

Holiday celebrated on 3 May in many parts of Spain and Hispanic America

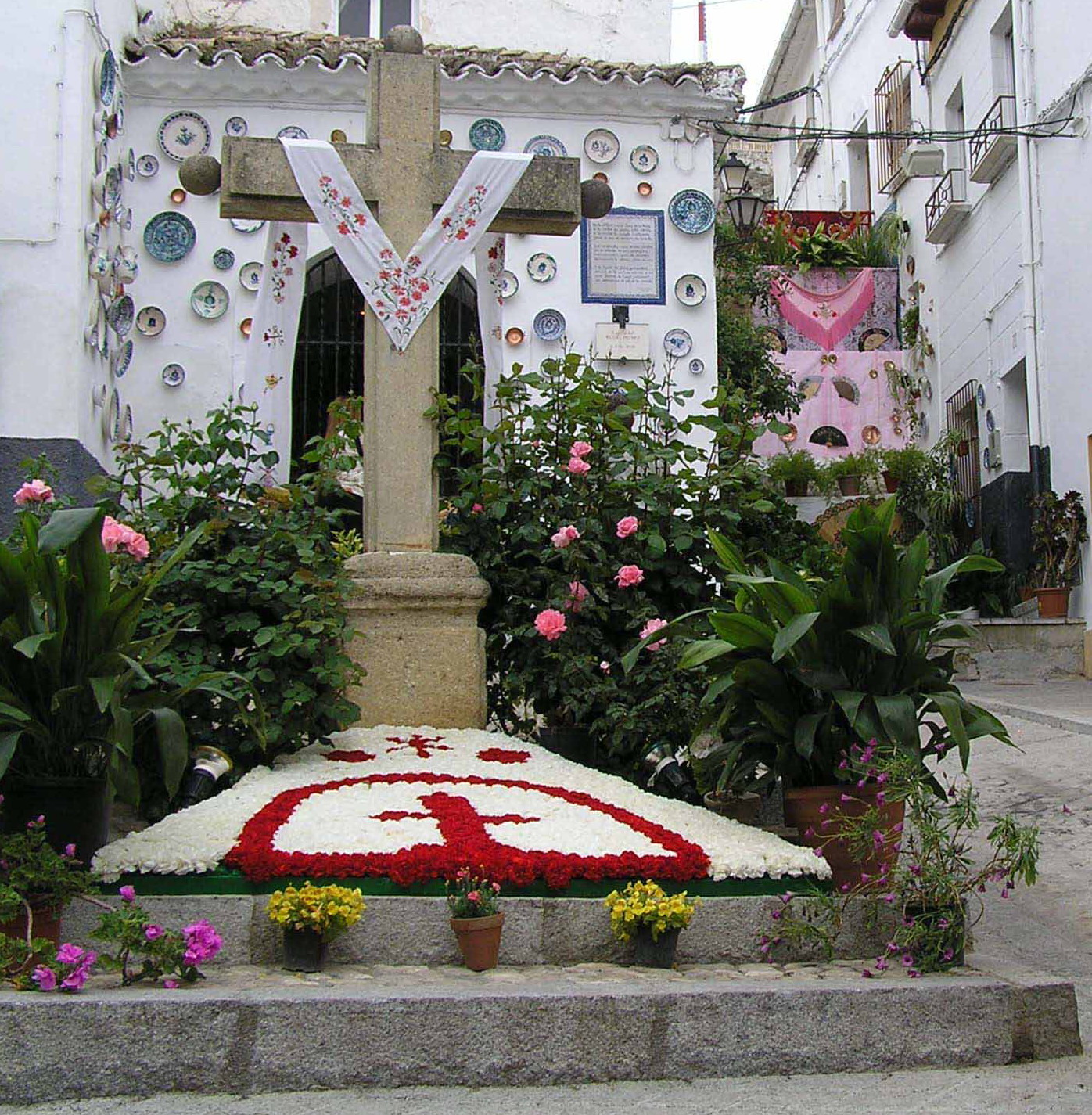
Cross decorated at Alcalá la Real, Spain.

The Fiesta de las Cruces ("Festival of the Crosses") or Cruz de Mayo ("May Cross") is a holiday celebrated on 3 May in many parts of Spain and Hispanic America.

== Origins ==
Religiously, the festival is rooted in the legendary search by the Byzantine Empress Saint Helena for the cross on which Jesus died, but the popular traditions connected to the festival certainly trace back to pagan traditions brought to Spain by the Roman Empire (see May Day).

The legend is that Emperor Constantine I, in the sixth year of his reign, confronted the barbarians on the banks of the Danube to christianity, in a battle where victory was believed to be impossible because of the great size of the enemy army. One night, Constantine had a vision of a cross in the sky, and by it the words "In hoc signo vincis" (With this sign, you shall be victorious). The emperor had a cross made and put it at the front of his army, which won an easy victory over the enemy multitude. On returning to the city and learning the significance of the cross, Constantine was baptized as a Christian and gave orders to construct Christian churches. He sent his mother, Saint Helena, to Jerusalem in search of the True Cross, the cross on which Jesus died. Once there, Helena summoned the wisest priests to aid in her attempt to find the cross. On Calvary hill, traditionally considered the site of Jesus's crucifixion, she found three bloody logs hidden. In order to discover which was the True Cross, she placed the logs one by one over sick people, and even dead people, who were cured or resuscitated at the touch of the True Cross. The veneration of the True Cross, and the use of pieces of the True Cross as relics, begins at this time. Saint Helena died praying for all believers in Christ to celebrate the commemoration of the day the Cross was found.

== Places where the holiday is celebrated ==
The "Fiesta de las Cruces" is celebrated in numerous places in Spain and Hispanoamerica.

=== Spain ===
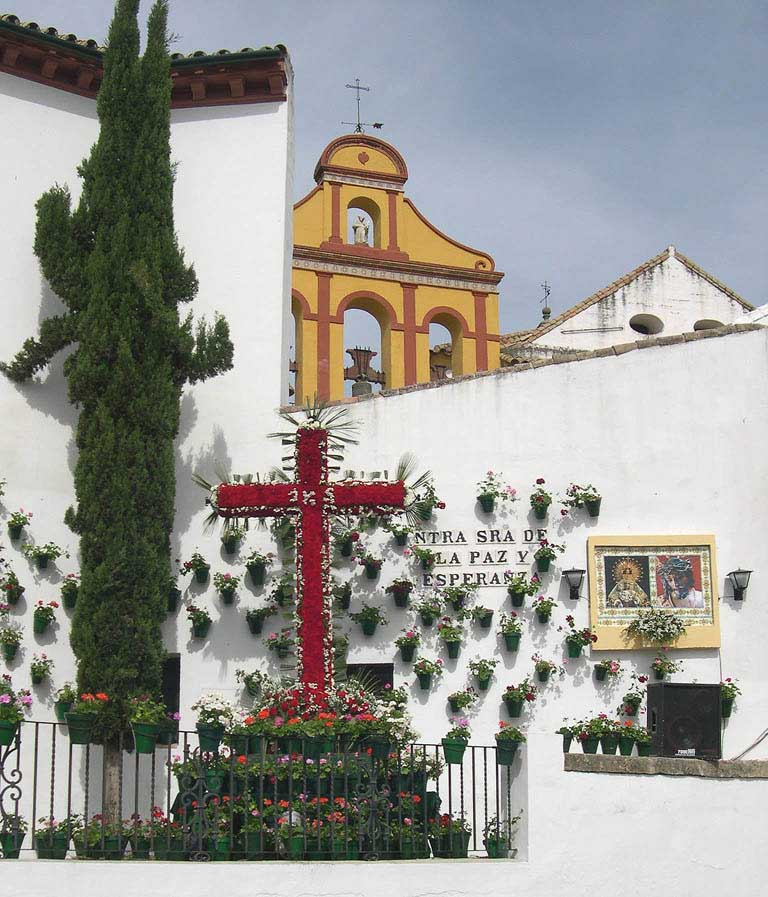
Cruz de mayo de la Cuesta del Bailío, 2005, Córdoba, Spain.

Various groups of people — usually affiliated with the Hermandades, the religious brotherhoods that organize the Easter Week processions — come together to decorate a tall cross with flowers.

They choose a picturesque square or street and decorate the area around the cross with typical and traditional items: a guitar, an embroidered shawl, old earthenware pots, and an old-fashioned sewing machine. For the cross of the Hermandad de Nuestra Señora del Carmen, Queen of the Sea, they decorate it fishing nets and tackle. For San Isidro, the Ploughman Saint, they display crops and traditional foodstuffs.

They set out these beautiful items, redolent of the past and the town's traditions, creating an artistic display that everyone comes to admire.

Although it is usually one of the Brotherhoods that decorates the crosses, it can also be a group of friends and neighbours, a youth group, or a charity who come together to create these lovely displays.

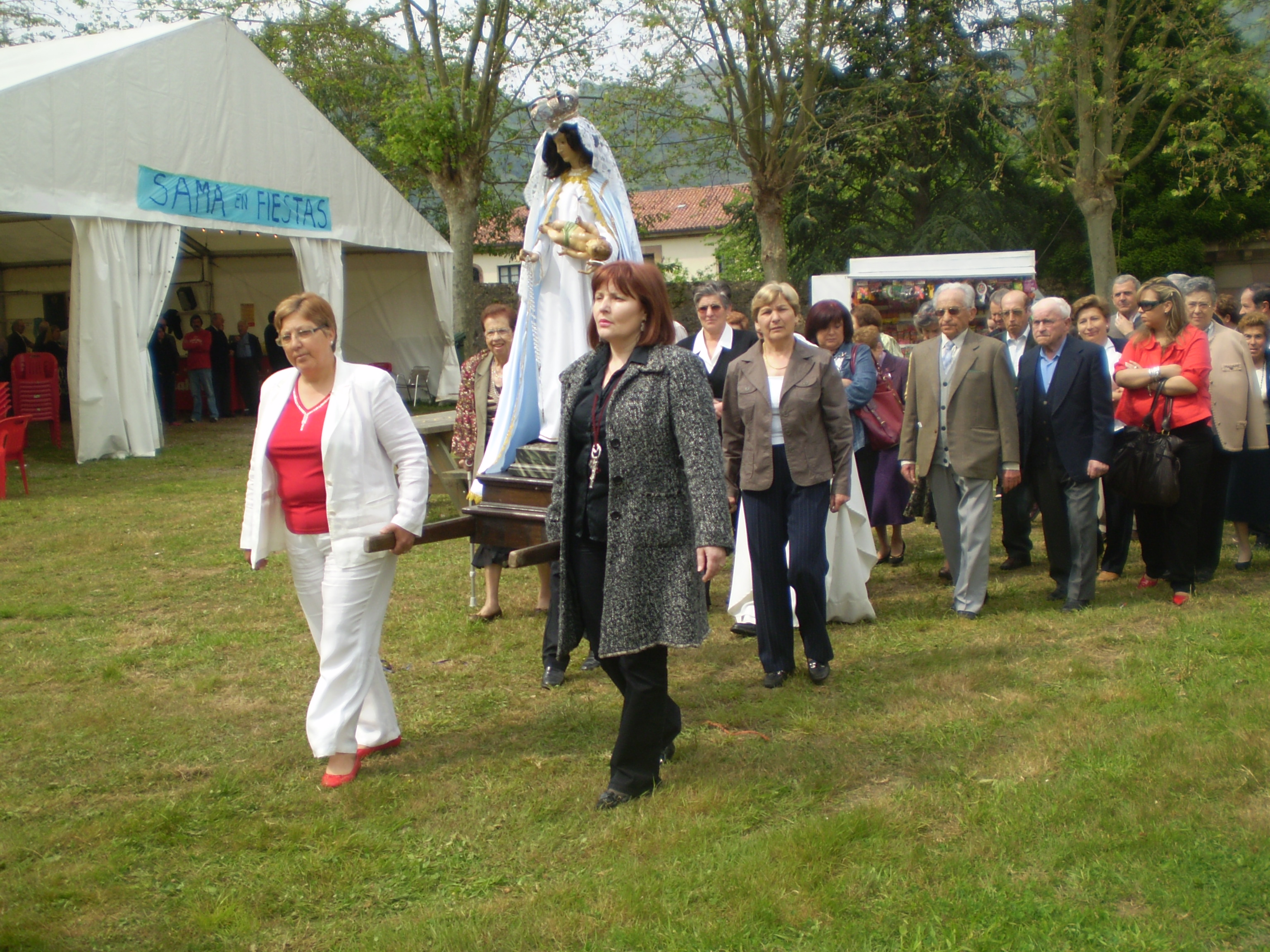
Procession of the Virgin, Cruz de Mayo, Sama de Grado, Asturias, Spain.

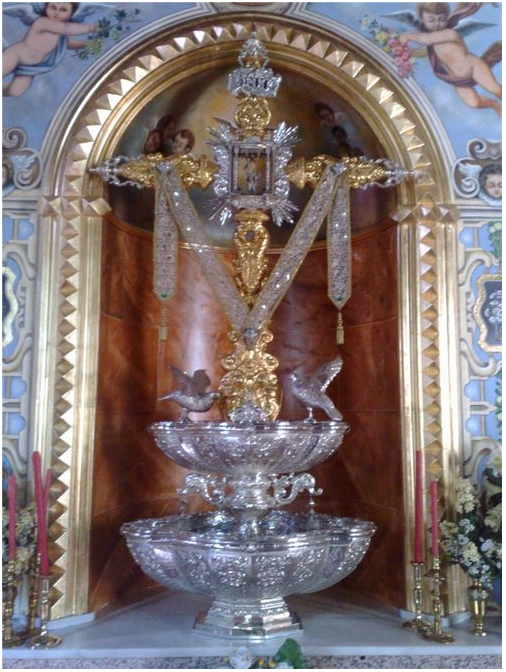
Cross of the Hermandad de la Cruz de la Calle La Fuente. Rociana del Condado, Province of Huelva.

=== Notable Celebrations ===
- Aguilar de la Frontera (Province of Córdoba). There is a procession of Nuestra Señora de los Remedios from the Iglesia de la Veracruz ("Church of the True Cross") in the Remedios neighborhood.
- Aguiama (La Rioja)
- Águilas (Region of Murcia) in the pedanía (sub-municipal district) of Calabardina
- Alboraya (Province of Valencia). Organized by the Junta Local de Hermandades de Semana Santa de Alboraya (Local Alboraya Grouping of Brotherhoods of the Holy Week)
- Alcalá la Real (Province of Jaén)
- Alhama de Murcia (Murcia)
- Alhaurín el Grande (Province of Málaga)
- Aljucer, a pedanía of the city of Murcia
- Alicante, in the Santa Cruz neighborhood
- Almería, throughout the historic center of the city
- Almonaster la Real (province of Huelva)
- Almuñécar (Province of Granada)
- Armilla (Province of Granada). The city government organizes a competition of decorated crosses on 3 May.
- Andosilla (Province of Navarre).
- Aranda de Duero (Province of Burgos). A cross is brought down from the church-museum of San Juan to the Plaza Mayor (main square), with hundreds of people dancing behind.
- Baza (Granada)
- Berrocal (Huelva)
- Bonares (Huelva)
- Breña Alta (Province of Santa Cruz de Tenerife)
- Breña Baja (Santa Cruz de Tenerife)
- Burriana (Province of Castellón)
- Cabeza la Vaca (Province of Badajoz). At different places around Cabeza la Vaca, crosses are adorned in a variety of motifs. On the night of 2 May, crosses are paraded through town, each accompanied by a musical group. On 3 May a procession goes through the streets of the city, with one primary cross representing the True Cross, but also many other crosses adorned by children with flowers.
- Cádiz. Crosses with flowers are taken in procession throughout the city. Also, folk festivals (verbenas) are held in honor of the cross, and many courtyards are decorated in floral motifs.
- Cadrete (Province of Zaragoza)
- Caminreal (Province of Teruel)
- Cieza (Murcia)
- Province of Ciudad Real. The festival is celebrated throughout the province. In particular, the celebrations at Campo de Calatrava, Piedrabuena and Villanueva de los Infantes in the comarca Campo de Montiel have been declared to be of Regional Touristic Interest.
- Coín (Málaga)
- Córdoba. The Fiesta de las Cruces is combined with a festival can competition for decorated courtyards in the Real Feria de Mayo, with 25 crosses and 50 patios (courtyards).
- Corte de Peleas (Province of Badajoz)
- Dosbarrios (Province of Toledo)
- Écija (Province of Seville). Organized by the Hermandad del Resucitado, with traditional children carrying the crosses. Celebrated on a Sunday (3 May or the first Sunday thereafter).
- El Madroño (Seville)
- El Viso del Alcor (Seville)
- Estepona (Malaga) Held on the first weekend of the month of May. There are about 10 different crosses, in different pretty squares of the town. The Ayuntamiento (Town Council) awards prizes for the best-decorated square and cross. People visit each cross to see if the agree with the judges. As well as the decoration, there is music, dancing, barbecues and general merriment all weekend long around each cross.
- Feria (Badajoz). Crosses are elaborately decorated in flowers, and altars are set up in rooms throughout the city. In 2008 there were more than 70 crosses. This celebration has been declared as of National Touristic Interest.
- Granada. One of the most beautiful of the festivals, and one of the cities most prominent for its celebrations of the holiday. Prizes are awarded in several categories: courtyards, streets and plazas, windows, and schools. The crosses are adorned with red and white carnations and are often surrounded by artisanal handicrafts and paired with a drinks stand.
- Granja de Rocamora (Alicante)
- Guadalcázar (Córdoba), in the Plaza de España
- Hellín (Province of Albacete)
- Huelva, especially for the Cruz de Mayo of San Pedro
- Jaén
- L'Alfàs del Pi (Province of Alicante)
- La Palma del Condado (Huelva)
- Lebrija (Seville)
- Linares (Jaén)
- Lucena del Puerto (Huelva)
- Málaga
- Martos (Jaén)
- Mengíbar (Jaén)
- Molinillo (Province of Salamanca)
- Montalbán de Córdoba (Córdoba)
- Montilla (Córdoba), in the Barrio de La Cruz.
- Motril (Granada). One of the most prominent of the festivals, rivaling that of Córdoba in fervor and enthusiasm. The festivities are considered of National Touristic Interest and it is considered the city's Feria Chica, that is, its second most important festival.
- Murcia (Región de Murcia)
- Mutxamel (Alicante)
- Otura (Granada)
- Piedrabuena (Ciudad Real)
- Pinos del Valle (Granada). Celebrated 1, 2, and 3 May, and dedicated to Santo Cristo del Zapato.
- Puente Genil (Córdoba)
- Paterna (Valencia), where it is celebrated 1 May
- El Puerto de Santa María (Cádiz)
- Torrelaguna (Madrid)
- Rociana del Condado (Huelva), with crosses on Calle La Fuente, Calle Las Huertas, Calle Orozco, Calle Nueva, Calle Cabreros, Calle Sevilla, Calle Candao, Calle Almonte, and Calle Arriba.
- Sagunto (Valencia), where it is celebrated 1 May
- Sama de Grado (Asturias). The origin of this celebration is uncertain, but it may go back as much as 500 years. One of its peculiarities is that instead of a procession centered on a cross, there is a procession of the Virgin of Sorrows dressed in sky blue to celebrate Christ's victory over death. The statue of the Virgin is displayed, successively in three aspects: as the mother of Jesus, as the Dolorosa accompanying Jesus to Calvary.
- Santa Cruz de La Palma (Santa Cruz de Tenerife). The festival here also celebrates the foundation of the city, on 3 May 1493.
- Santa Cruz de Tenerife. The festival here also celebrates the foundation of the city, on 3 May 1494.
- Los Realejos (Santa Cruz de Tenerife), in the Barrio de la Cruz Santa
- Seville
- Úbeda (Jaén)
- Valencia
- Valencia de Alcántara (Province of Cáceres)
- Villa de Mazo (Santa Cruz de Tenerife)
- Villabrágima (Province of Valladolid)
- Villalgordo del Marquesado (Province of Cuenca)
- Xàbia (Alicante)

=== Colombia ===
The Departments of Antioquia, Caldas, Quindío, and Risaralda, and the municipality of Funza, diocese of Facatativá, have a large population of Basque descent, who carry on the tradition of the Día de la Santa Cruz ("Day of the Holy Cross") or Día de los Mil Jesuses ("Day of the Thousand Jesuses") on 3 May. People speak the name of Jesus one thousand times, and believe this will protect them through the coming year.

=== Guatemala ===
Most of Guatemala celebrates the Fiesta de las Cruces largely in a symbolic and respectful manner, with colorful processions.

The construction equipment and materials retailer FFACSA, one of Guatemala's leading businesses, sponsors a large and less traditional celebration in Chimaltenango Department. That celebration begins at 6 p.m. on 2 May with a celebration of the eucharist in honor of the Holy Cross. On 3 May people begin to gather at 3 a.m. and parade through the streets of various municipalities of the department, after which there are various sporting activities (including mountain biking and a marathon). At noon, roughly 3,000 construction workers gather for lunch at FFACSA's various branch offices (in Quetzaltenango, Sacatepéquez, Totonicapán) and at their central site in Chimaltenango. After lunch there are raffles, with prizes such as motorcycles, bicycles, televisions, DVD players, and household appliances. At 4 p.m. there is an open-air concert at the park in the center of Chimaltenango, again with raffles and prizes, and from 7 p.m. there are fireworks competitions.

=== Mexico ===
In Mexico, the celebration of the Holy Cross began at the dawn of the 16th century, when captain Juan de Grijalva gave the name Isla de la Santa Cruz to the island now known as Cozumel, Quintana Roo. The holiday is celebrated in Mexico mainly by guilds and unions involved in construction. A cross adorned with flowers and paper is placed in a high position on a building in the process of construction. The workers then celebrate with local cuisine and alcoholic beverages such as tequila, mezcal, and local beer.

=== Peru ===
- Junín (Junín Province, Junín Region)
- Cerro de Pasco (Pasco Province, Pasco Region)
- Huancayo (Huancayo Province, Junín Region)
- Amazonas Region
- Chupaca Province (Junín Region)
- Ayacucho (Huamanga Province, Ayacucho Region)
- Puno (Puno Province, Puno Region)
- Huancavelica (Huancavelica Region)
- Ica Region
- Roman Catholic Diocese of Tacna y Moquegua, comprising the lay administrative regions Tacna Region and Moquegua region

=== Venezuela ===
- Choroní, Aragua State has a celebration of great importance and tradition. The entire village and many visitors have a large festival on the Caribbean shore and dance to drums until dawn in honor of the Cruz de Mayo.
- Guatire, Miranda State has had a cross as its patron since its foundation in the 17th century. The cross is known as Santa Cruz de Pacairigua, after the Pacairigua River, which runs through the city. The sculptured cross resides in the parish church of Guatire, and its festival is 3 May.
- In the east of Venezuela and in the Barlovento of Miranda vigils are held for the Cruz de Mayo, in which the cross is adorned and praised with fulías and décimas.

=== El Salvador ===
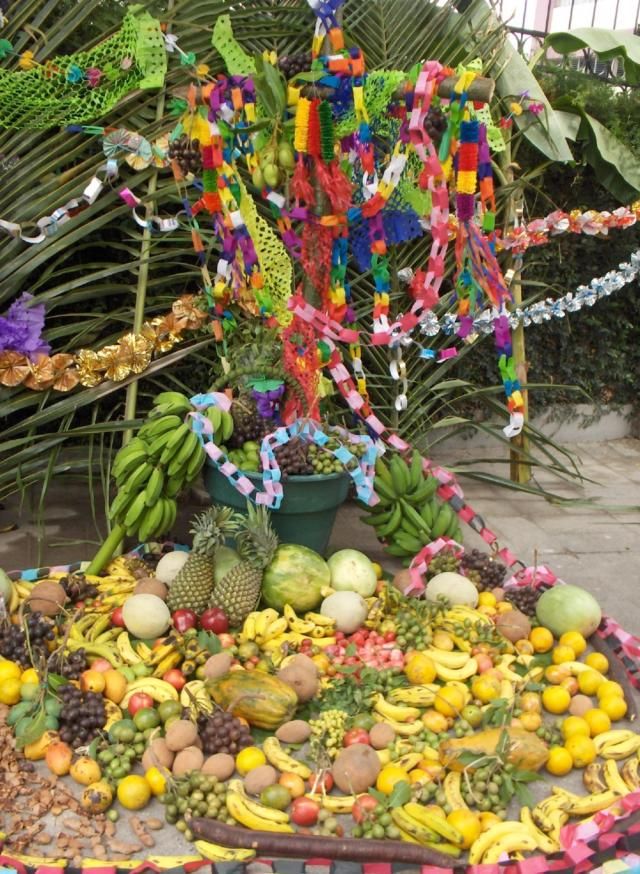
A decorated cross with offerings during the Day of the Cross in El Salvador.

In El Salvador, the Day of the Cross ("Día de la Cruz" in Spanish), as it is known, is celebrated on 3 May. This celebration is not considered an official government or church holiday; it only marks the beginning of the "wet" or rainy season in winter. It is a tradition that dates back to prehispanic times during which the indigenous people of the region (Pipiles) offered food to give thanks to the gods and Mother Earth for what they provided. The cross was added when the tradition fused with Catholicism during the colonial period. The cross is made from wood, and decorated with flowers and long chains of colorful tissue paper. Fruits, grains, vegetables, drinks, candies and sometimes money are placed at the foot of the cross as offerings. Visitors to the household are invited to take offerings with them after they kneel in front of the cross and recite a thanksgiving prayer.

=== Trinidad ===
In Lopinot, Trinidad, parang is performed at the Cruz de Mayo (May Cross) festival, a ritual whose performance strongly mirrors the contemporary Santa Rosa Festival and was likely the source of its patterning. The Cruz de Mayo celebrates the month of Mary, and is also when the maypole is performed, which has even more significance for the Caribs as it was amalgamated into their traditions of weaving the sebucán, their cassava strainer (the dance around the maypole, weaving the ribbons together, is seen as mimicking the weaving of the sebucán).
