= Piragua =

Piragua may refer to:

- Piragua (food), a Puerto Rican frozen treat shaped like a pyramid
- "Piragua" (song), a piragua vendor's song (or its reprise) from the 2008 Broadway musical In the Heights
- "La Piragua" (song), a cumbia song by José Barros
- Piragua, or pirogue, a small, fast, flat-bottomed boat
