= Pedro Rocamora y García =

Spanish bishop and senator (1832-1925)

Pedro Rocamora
- Bishop of Tortosa
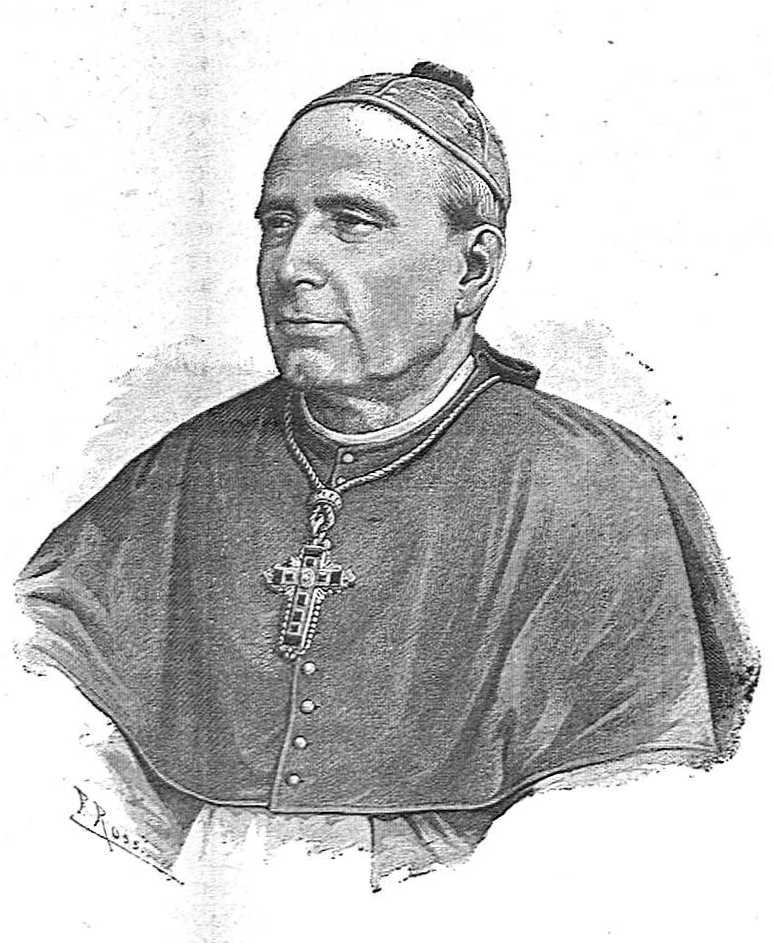
- Church: Roman Catholic
- Diocese: Diocese of Tortosa
- Installed: 26 August 1894
- Term ended: January 1925
- Predecessor: Francisco Aznar y Pueyo
- Successor: Félix Bilbao Ugarriza

Orders
- Ordination: 16 February 1856

Personal details
- Born: 11 February 1832 Granja de Rocamora, Alicante
- Died: 19 January 1925 (aged 92) Castellón de la Plana
- Motto: Tu es Domine spes mea
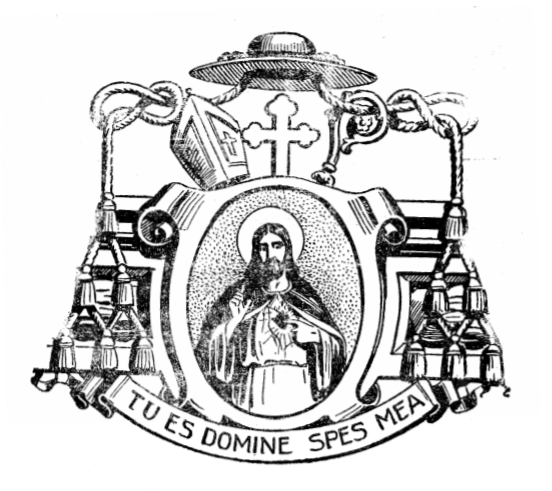
- Coat of arms

Pedro Rocamora y García (11 February 1832 – 19 January 1925) was a Spanish Roman Catholic bishop and senator.

== Biography ==
His parents were called José and Josefa. He was born at the Granja de Rocamora village in the province of Alicante, and was baptized 12 February 1832.

He passed the first three years of a philosophy degree from 1845 to 1848, at the local institute of Orihuela.

In October 1848 he entered the diocesan seminary of the municipality, where he finished his philosophy studies and was educated in Sacred Theology and Canon Law, obtaining the highest degrees of the course.

In 1855 he obtained a bachelor's degree in theology, and in July 1857 he became a doctor of Theology at Valencia.

He started teaching philosophy at the seminary in 1854, and was appointed as full professor of Dogmatic Theology and Moral Theology the following year, a position he held until 1860.

He was ordained 16 February 1856. In January 1860 he became oikonomos of the minor basilica of Santa María, at Elche. In 1864 he was examined to enter the Penitenciaría de Valencia, and in 1866 for the Cathedral of Orihuela. In 1869 he became a candidate for the Penitenciaría of Orihuela, a position he held from 5 May 1867.

On 18 December 1893 he was proposed by the Queen Regent as Bishop of Tortosa, and 21 May 1894 he was approved by papal consistory.

Rocamora carried out his pastoral work in various positions and places: he was in charge of the cemetery of Orihuela; held a directive position at the Confraternity of Our Lady of Montserrat, he served as local president of the Society of Saint Vincent de Paul and was president and director of a local confraternity for women called "Las Mónicas". Rocamora was deeply committed to the ministry of penance and served as confessor for the local religious orders. The bishop started administering confessions at dawn and remained at the confessionary most of the day.

A contemporary newspaper described his actions writing that:

Amidst his multiple works, he did not stop to frequently make use of his teaching powers, in which he made manifest his deep knowledge, his simplicity, his virtue and his evangelical spirit, as the only objective of his preaching was giving consolation to people's hearts and conquering their souls for heaven.

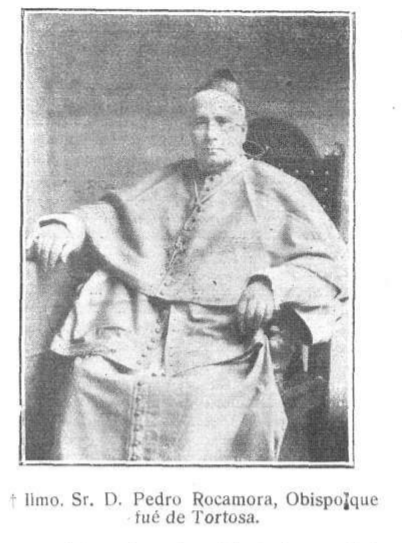
Bishop Pedro Rocamora, depicted at El Siglo Futuro.

During his leadership of the Diocese of Tortosa, he travelled around it many times and preached at all its parishes. According to the Correo de Tortosa newspaper, Rocamora would experience health problems due to his exhausting activities.

Rocamora introduced in his diocese the practise of reading religious meditations at the churches during Lent, using a series of spiritual exercises written by the bishop of Orihuela Félix Herrero Valverde which were popular at Spain by that time. On a diocesan encyclical, he stressed the importance of teaching Christian doctrine to the locals.

Rocamora was particularly noted for his preaching, and wrote numerous pastoral letters during his term.

In August 1919, there were celebrations on the whole diocese organized to commemorate his 25 years as bishop. An extraordinary edition of the local ecclesiastical bulletin was published with the occasion of the festivity, in which many members of the local clergy praised his figure. He was renowned for his deep scholarship and modesty.

He collaborated with El Siglo Futuro newspaper, of which he was also a reader and subscriber. He praised Ramón Nocedal, its director and founder of the Integrist Party, as a «distinguished confessor of Christ and ornament of Religion and the Fatherland».
