= Malagueña =

Malagueña may refer to:

- Malagueña, pertaining to the city of Málaga, Spain
- La malagueña, a painting from 1917 by Julio Romero de Torres

== Music ==
- Malagueña (genre), a Venezuelan genre of folk music
- Malagueña (song), the sixth movement of the Suite Andalucia by Ernesto Lecuona, which became a popular song
- Malagueñas (flamenco style), the flamenco palo or style
- "Malagueña Salerosa", a 1947 Mexican song by Elpidio Ramírez, Roque Ramírez and Pedro Galindo
- Malagueña, the second movement of Dmitri Shostakovich's Fourteenth Symphony
- Malagueña, the second movement of Maurice Ravel's Rapsodie espagnole
- Malagueña, a piece from Spanish composer Isaac Albéniz's famous piano composition España, Opus 165
- Malagueña, a piece from composer Pablo de Sarasate's Spanish Dances, Op. 21
