= Polo (music) =

Polo designates two forms of Venezuelan folk music. One that originates from Margarita Island and another one that is played in Coro, in the state of Falcón.

== Polo Margariteño ==
=== Lyrical form ===
The Polo from Margarita is sung in octosyllabic or hendecasyllabic verses with varying rhyme schemes. Typically the stanzas are composed of four verses, and common rhyme schemes include ABAB and ABBA. Traditionally, however, the polo, like the malagueña and galerón has been sung in décima form, that is, ten verses of eight syllables each, with an "ABBAACCDDC" rhyme scheme. It is typical for each verse in the polo to be sung twice, which has lent to it being sung as a duet on occasion.

The theme of the polo's lyrics are typically centered around life in the island of Margarita and the states of Sucre, and Anzoátegui. As a result, the imagery and habits of coastal life are frequently the subject of the polo, as evidenced by the following stanza:

Yo fui marino y que en una isla
de una culisa me enamoré
y en una noche de mucha brisa
en mi falucho me la robé.

The theme of love is also common in polos, both as isolated stanzas and as the main focus of the text. Some artists who illustrate the romantically-oriented polo include Gualberto Ibarreto and the quartet Serenata Guayanesa. An excerpt of the "Polo de la soledad" (Polo of solitude) by Serenata reads as follows:

Quiero ser la soledad
porque solo estoy contigo
Si estoy solo, eres mi abrigo
y solo te quiero más.

=== Harmony ===
The harmonic structure cycles between an initial major key and its relative minor. The basic progression can be described as III(I)-VII(V7)-i-V7 (the Roman numerals in parentheses represent chord functions in the initial major key). This basic harmonic form evidences the origins of the polo in the Spanish Renaissance, as the progression is known as the Romanesca. This basic version has been recorded by Cecilia Todd.

A more common elaboration of the harmony would be III(I)-VII7(V7)-V7-i-iv-V7-i-VII7(V7). This version has been recorded by a great many artists ranging from Soledad Bravo to Francisco Mata, among others.

== Polo Coriano ==
Pending research about Cheché Acosta Fuguet (past), and the duo of Nano Bravo and Chucho Penso (current).
