= La Piragua =

Song
- Genre: Cumbia
- Songwriter: José Barros

"La Piragua" (translation "the canoe") is a song written by the Colombian songwriter, José Barros, in the cumbia genre.

The song has been listed as one of the best Colombian songs of all time by multiple media sources:

- In its list of the ten most iconic Colombian songs, El Nuevo Siglo rated La Piragua at number eight.
- In its list of the fifty best Colombian songs of all time, El Tiempo, Colombia's most widely circulated newspaper, ranked the versions of the song by Los Black Stars and Gabriel "Rumba" Romero at number three.
- Viva Music Colombia rated the song number seven on its list of the one hundred most important Colombian songs of all time.

The song has been recorded by multiple artists, including Carlos Vives, Celso Piña, Los Black Stars, Los Corraleros de Majagual, Gabriel Romero, Trio Los Inseparables, Los Hermanos Martelo, Luisin Landaez, Dolores Vargas, Paco Navarrete, Anibal Lopez, Los Flippers, Catalina Carrasco, Lito Barrientos, La Swingbaly, Orquesta La Palanquera, Julieta Venegas and Sonora Ñiko Estrada.
