= Mina (drum) =

The Mina drum (Tambor Mina) is the largest of the drums that have origins in the Barlovento, Miranda region of Venezuela. They are used during the celebrations of St. John the Baptist and the Midsummer. It is a specialized form of the Cumaco drum. Its origins have been traced to the Mina civilization, which occupied what is now Benin in Africa.

== Organology ==
The drum is made out of the trunk of the guava tree (or other hardwood) that has been naturally hollowed out by termites. It can measure up to 2m (6 ft) in length, with a diameter varying (because it fluctuates with the available material) between 20 and 40 cm (about 10-14 inches). One end is capped with a head made of cow or deer hide held in place with a peg and rope assembly. The other end is open.

== Playing style ==
The mina is placed on a fork to elevate the drum head to the soloist's chest level. The soloist holds a pair of sticks to beat the main pattern and improvisations on the drum head. A group of accompanists stand and squat alongside and beat an ostinato pattern with sticks on the shell. A smaller drum, named curbata plays the basic pattern with little or no deviation. Unlike the pattern of the redondo drum, which is divided in multiples of 3 beats per measure, the pattern of the Mina battery is based on multiples of 2 beats per measure.

Tonada de Tambor Mina
The opening section of a Mina ensemble, featuring the main drumming patterns and the call and response format of the vocals.

== Cultural significance ==
The mina battery is an integral part of the summer celebrations in Afro-Venezuelan communities of North-Central Venezuela (the region called Barlovento). The celebrations of the Summer Solstice coincides with the day of San Juan Bautista (St. John the Baptist), which may account for the Saint's popularity in Barlovento. The mina (also called Tambor Grande or large drum) is set up on a fixed location, where people converge to hear and dance to the performance. In contrast, the smaller, lighter redondo battery (called Tambor Pequeño or small drum) is carried around by the musicians and played at different points of the procession dedicated to St. John.

== Cumaco or Mina? ==
The Mina is a specialized form of the cumaco drum. The main differences between the two terms are:

- Cumacos are widespread in many Afro-Venezuelan communities. The Mina is unique to Barlovento.
- Cumacos have the head nailed or tacked on the drum shell. Minas use a rope/wedge assembly (a method still used in Africa in the Ewe, Adowa and the Igba drum families).
- Cumaco ensembles may include more than one large drum. Mina ensembles only have one large drum and a smaller one, the aforementioned curbata.
- Cumacos are often laid on the ground and played by sitting astride (soloist) and squatting alongside. Minas are held on a diagonal with a wooden fork, so the soloist may stand in front of the drum head.

== Bibliography ==
- Max H. Brandt African Drumming from Rural Communities around Caracas and Its Impact on Venezuelan Music and Ethnic Identity - published in Music and Black Ethnicity: the Caribbean and South America edited by Gerard H. Béhague - North-South Center Press at the University of Miami, 1994.
- Jesús Chucho García Barlovento: Nuestro Patrimonio Cultural - Caracas, Fundación Afroamérica, Centro Cultural BID, IACEM n/d
