= Gerard Béhague =

French ethnomusicologist (1937–2005)

Gerard H. L. Béhague
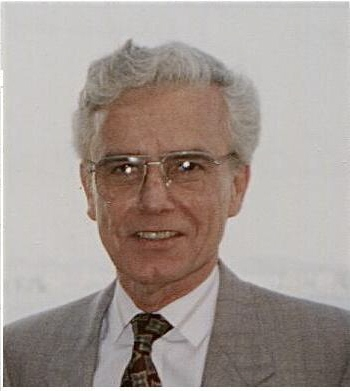
- Béhague in 1994
- Born: 2 November 1937; Montpellier, France
- Died: 13 June 2005 (aged 67); Austin, Texas, USA
- Citizenship: France, USA
- Education: Tulane University
- Known for: Latin American ethnomusicology; Primary research into candomblé music
- Scientific career
- Fields: Ethnomusicology, musicology, music history
- Workplaces: University of Illinois at Urbana-Champaign, University of Texas at Austin
- Doctoral advisor: Gilbert Chase

Gerard Henri Luc Béhague (November 2, 1937 – June 13, 2005) was a Franco-American ethnomusicologist and professor of Latin American music. His specialty was the music of Brazil and the Andean countries and the influence of West Africa on the music of the Caribbean and South America, especially candomblé music. His lifelong work earned him recognition as the leading scholar of Latin American ethnomusicology.

== Biography ==
Béhague was born in Montpellier, France and raised in Rio de Janeiro, Brazil. There he studied piano, music theory and composition at the National School of Music of the University of Brazil and the Brazilian Conservatory of Music. He earned a diploma from the latter (1959), a master's degree in musicology from the University of Paris (Sorbonne; 1962), and a Ph.D. in musicology from Tulane University (1966), where he studied under the noted music historian Gilbert Chase. In 1962, Béhague married Cecilia Pareja, a daughter of Ecuadorian writer and diplomat Alfredo Pareja Diezcanseco.

Béhague taught music history, American music, and Latin American music at the University of Illinois at Urbana-Champaign from 1966 to 1974. His scholarly interests gravitated towards ethnomusicology (a new field of interdisciplinary study of music and its complex interrelationships with the cultures that produce it). He ultimately started a program there in Latin American ethnomusicology which is currently maintained by one of his protégés, former UT Austin student Robin Moore.

Béhague joined the School of Music faculty at the University of Texas at Austin in 1974, his permanent academic position, where he was instrumental in establishing the graduate program in ethnomusicology. At UT Austin, he served as chairman of the Department of Music (1980–89), as Frank C. Erwin, Jr. Endowed Professor in Music (1985–2005) and as Virginia L. Murchison Endowed Regents Professor of Fine Arts (1995–2005). He died of lung cancer on June 13, 2005.

== Scholarship ==
Béhague was recognized during his later life as the leading scholar of Latin American ethnomusicology. He was particularly well known for his research on the music of Brazil, which he studied both as a music historian and as an ethnomusicologist. He served (1969–77) as associate editor of the Yearbook for Inter-American Musical Research, and as editor (1974–78) of the journal Ethnomusicology. In 1980 he founded, and subsequently edited, the Latin American Music Review, a journal drawing together academics from all of the Americas to publish in three languages. He was president of the Society for Ethnomusicology (1979–81) and served on the board of directors of several other professional associations.

He trained several of the well-known Latin Americanist ethnomusicologists active today both in the United States and Latin America, and he researched and published extensively on various aspects of this field. He published two edited volumes, and two books of his own, Music in Latin America: An Introduction (1979), and Heitor Villa-Lobos: The Search for Brazil's Musical Soul (1994).

== Honors and accolades ==
- Guggenheim Fellowship (1972)
- National Endowment for the Humanities grants (19??-??; As Director, Summer Seminars for College Teachers)
- Corresponding membership, Brazilian Academy of Music (1994)
- "Commander of the Order of Rio Branco" (1997; Awarded by government of Brazil)

== Works ==
- "Popular Music Currents in the Art Music of the Early Nationalistic Period in Brazil, circa 1870-1920." Ph.D. dissertation, musicology, Tulane University. 1966.
- Béhague, Gerard H., ed. (1984), "Performance Practice: Ethnomusicological Perspectives", Westport, CT.: Greenwood Press.
- Béhague, Gerard H., ed. (1994), "Music and Black Ethnicity: The Caribbean and South America", University of Miami North-South Center (publisher); New Brunswick and London: Transaction Publishers (distributor).

=== Books ===
- Béhague, Gerard H. (1971), "The Beginnings of Musical Nationalism in Brazil", Detroit: Information Coordinators, Inc.
- Béhague, Gerard H. (1979), Music in Latin America: An Introduction, Englewood Cliffs, N.J.: Prentice-Hall.
- Béhague, Gerard H. (1994), Heitor Villa-Lobos: The Search for Brazil's Musical Soul, Austin, Texas: ILAS Monographs, UT Press.

=== Articles ===
- "Biblioteca da Ajuda (Lisbon) MSS 1595/1596: Two 18th-century Anonymous Collections of Modinhas." Anuario Yearbook for Inter-American Musical Research, vol.4, edited by Gilbert Chase, pp. 44–81. New Orleans: Tulane University, 1968.
- "Luiz Cosme (1908-1965): Impulso creador versus conciencia formal." Anuario Yearbook for Inter-American Musical Research, vol.5, edited by Gilbert Chase, pp. 67–89. New Orleans: Tulane University, 1969.
- "Music." Handbook of Latin American Studies, vol.32. Ed. by Henry E. Adams, pp. 466–483. Gainesville: University of Florida, 1970.
- "Music." Handbook of Latin American Studies, vol.34. Ed. by Donald J. Stewart, pp. 568–586. Gainesville: University of Florida, 1972.
- "Bossa & Bossas: Recent Changes in Brazilian Urban Popular Music." Ethnomusicology 17, no.2 (May 1973), pp. 209–233.
- "Latin American Folk Music." In Folk and Traditional Music of the Western Continents, 2nd ed., edited by Bruno Nettl, pp. 179–206. Englewood Cliffs, N.J.: Prentice-Hall, Inc., 1973.
- "Music." Handbook of Latin American Studies, vol.36. Ed. by Donald E.J. Stewart, pp. 480–495. Gainesville: University of Florida, 1974.
- "Notes on Regional and National Trends in Afro-Brazilian Cult Music." In Tradition and Renewal: Essays on Twentieth-Century Latin American Literature and Culture, edited by Merlin H. Forster, pp. 68–80. Urbana: University of Illinois Press, 1975.
- "Some Liturgical Functions of Afro-Brazilian Religious Music in Salvador, Bahia." The World of Music 19, nos.3-4 (1977), pp. 4–23.
- "South American Masked Dances: An Overview." The World of Music 22, no.1 (1980), pp. 23–38.
- "Patterns of Candomblé Music Performance: An Afro-Brazilian Religious Setting." In Performance Practice: Ethnomusicological Perspectives, edited by Gerard Béhague, pp. 222–254. Westport, CT: Greenwood Press, 1984.
- "Popular Music." In Handbook of Latin American Culture, Ed. by Harold E. Hinds, Jr. and Charles M. Tatum, pp. 3–38. Westport, CT: Greenwood Press, 1985.
- "Popular Music in Latin America." Studies in Latin American Popular Culture 5 (1986), pp. 41–68.
- "Latin American Folk Music." In Folk and Traditional Music of the Western Continents, 3rd ed., edited by Bruno Nettl, pp. 185–228. Englewood Cliffs, N.J.: Prentice-Hall, Inc., 1990.
- "Reflections on the Ideological History of Latin American Ethnomusicology." In Comparative Musicology and Anthropology of Music: Essays on the History of Ethnomusicology, edited by Bruno Nettl and Philip V. Bohlman, pp. 56–68. Chicago and London: The University of Chicago Press, 1991.
- "Latin America." In Ethnomusicology: Historical and Regional Studies, edited by Helen Myers, pp. 472–494. New York: Norton, 1993.
- "Afro-Brazilian Traditions." In The Garland Encyclopedia of World Music, Volume 2: South America, Mexico, Central America, and the Caribbean, edited by Dale A. Olsen and Daniel E. Sheehy, pp. 340–355. New York: Garland, 1998.
- "Rap, Reggae, Rock, or Samba: The Local and the Global in Brazilian Popular Music, 1985-1995." Chapter 9 In Musical Cultures of Latin America: Global Effects, Past and Present. Selected Reports in Ethnomusicology, Volume XI, edited by Steven Loza, pp. 111–120. Los Angeles: Department of Ethnomusicology and Systematic Musicology, University of California, Los Angeles, 2003.
- Schechter, John M. "A Tribute to Gerard Béhague." Revista de Música Latinoamericana/Latin American Music Review, Fall/Winter 2005, 26:2, pp. 143–157.
- Béhague, Gerard H. (2006), "Rap, Reggae, Rock, or Samba: The Local and the Global in Brazilian Popular Music (1985-95)", Latin American Music Review, Spring/Summer issue, 27:1 pp 79–90 (doi=10.1353/lat.2006.0021).

== Legacy ==
The Gerard Béhague and Everett Helm Latin American Sheet Music Collection, 1917–1969, is housed at the Sousa Archives and Center for World Music. This collection consists of Brazilian sheet music from the period, c. 1915–1945, and popular Argentine sheet music from the same time period, as well as popular Cuban sheet music from the 1960s. The sheet music was purchased by the University of Illinois at the request of Béhague, who used it for his research.
