= Malagueña (genre) =

Genre of folk music from Venezuela

The malagueña (Spanish pronunciation: [malaˈɣeɲa]) is a genre of folk music from eastern Venezuela, most notably from the island of Margarita. It is characterized by a solo vocal performance and typical accompaniment of a mandolin, a cuatro and a guitar, with a rhythm in 3/4 time.

== History and Etymology ==
The malagueña traces its origins back to Andalusia, evidenced clearly in the name, as "malagueña" pertains to the city of Málaga in southern Andalusia. This link is further evidenced by the malagueñas palo of flamenco, which has a similar harmonic progression to the Venezuelan genre.

There is a further possibility that the malagueña entered Venezuela not directly from Andalusia but instead through settlers from the Canary Islands. Isleño folk music also includes a style of malagueña which derives from the flamenco palo. Like the Venezuelan malagueña, the isleño malagueña's timple accompaniment marks the beats of the 3/4 time, where in flamenco it is more common to perform the malagueñas in "cante libre". Furthermore, multiple verses are typically performed in the isleño and Venezuelan malagueñas, whilst in flamenco it is not uncommon to perform only one verse. Given these commonalities with the Canary Islands malagueña, coupled with Venezuela's long history of Canarian settlement and immigration, there is support to the origin of the Venezuelan malagueña in the Canary Islands as opposed to the Spanish mainland.

Margariteño musician and composer José Elías "Chelías" Villaroel proposes an alternate etymology for the malagueña, suggesting that the genre was originally entitled halagüeña (from halagar "to flatter") due to the flattering nature of the lyrics, and only later was the "m" added via conflation with the existing musical styles from Spain and Andalusia. He also attests that it originated in the Venezuelan state of Sucre.

== Text ==
=== Poetic Form ===
The verses of the malagueña are built as hendecasyllabic or octosyllabic quatrains with rhyme schemes of either ABAB or ABBA. An example of a malagueña verse is one performed by the Venezuelan ensemble Vasallos del sol, transcribed below:

Presento ante la cruz este milagro A
de haberme muerto en vida y renacer B
de haber querido mucho y olvidado A
y darme como premio otro querer. B

In practice, however, the verses of the malagueña are performed with an initial and final repetition of the first line, making it a six-line structure with a rhyme scheme of AABABA. The example above would thus be performed as follows:

Presento ante la cruz este milagro A
Presento ante la cruz este milagro A
de haberme muerto en vida y renacer B
de haber querido mucho y olvidado A
y darme como premio otro querer. B
Presento ante la cruz este milagro. A

=== Themes ===
Given the predominance of the malagueña in eastern Venezuela, it often features lyrics centered on the culture of this region. This is demonstrated in the following excerpt from a malagueña by folk singer Gualberto Ibarreto, where he references the Virgen del Valle, the patron saint of eastern Venezuela:

Una noche de encanto y poesía
tu alma amor juraba con pasión
se hincaba madre mía de rodillas
a rezarle a la Virgen del Valle una oración

Other common themes frequently featured in malagueñas involve love, heartache, physical and emotional pain and exhaustion, grief and death. Take, for example, a verse which is featured in many performances and recordings of malagueñas:

No puedo luchar mas, estoy cansado,
si dejo de luchar es cobardía.
Traigo el corazón despedazado
por conseguir tu amor, amada mía.

Here the poetic voice declares they're incapable of struggling anymore from exhaustion, but laments that ceasing this struggle is a sign of cowardice. They go on to elaborate how their heart is torn to shreds from their effort to earn the love of the poetic object. On a similar thematic note, another popular verse has the poetic voice refuse to sing more, as their soul and heart are hurting and they are out of both love and breath:

No me obliguen que cante, que no puedo,
me duele el alma, me duele el corazón.
Se me acabó el amor y el resuello,
el canto me oprime la respiración.

Many traditional malagueñas are written from a male perspective and often focus on feminine presences in the singer's life, be it lovers, young women in meadows, the Virgen del Valle, or maternal figures. The latter is featured in a malagueña composed by Aquiles Nazoa and performed by singers including Soledad Bravo and Simón Díaz. In this excerpt from Nazoa's malagueña, the poetic voice speaks on how they were absent from their mother's deathbed, but in her final moments, she raised her hand and blessed them nonetheless:

Murió mi madre y yo estaba ausente
Yo ausente estaba, yo no la vi.
Pero dice mi padre que, en su agonía de muerte,
Alzó su mano y me bendijo a mi.

== Music ==
=== Harmony ===
Owing to its Spanish origins and influence, the malagueña shares several harmonic elements with the flamenco palo of the same name. It can be interpreted as being in a Flamenco mode or, as is more often the case in Venezuela, a major mode that modulates to the relative minor at the end of the verse. Using the latter interpretation, the harmonic progression of the malagueña would proceed as follows (each chord represents one 3/4 bar of music):

- 1st line of text: I V^{7} I I
- 1st line repeat.: I^{7} I^{7} IV IV
- 2nd line of text: V^{7} V^{7} I I
- 3rd line of text: I V^{7}/V V V
- 4th line of text: V^{7} V^{7} I I^{7}
- 1st line repeat.: IV ii^{ø}/vi V^{7}/vi V^{7}/vi
- preparation for next verse: vi V^{7}

This formula at times receives basic alterations. For instance, Gualberto Ibarreto's rendition of the malagueña features a longer preparation, with the ensemble vamping on the first I chord for several bars before he begins the next verse. He also takes significant temporal liberties that are not necessarily uncommon in performances of malagueñas. Another common alteration is either the omission of the V^{7} chord in the first line altogether or its replacement with a nonenharmonic major II chord, which corresponds to a less common melodic formula of the malagueña.

=== Melody ===
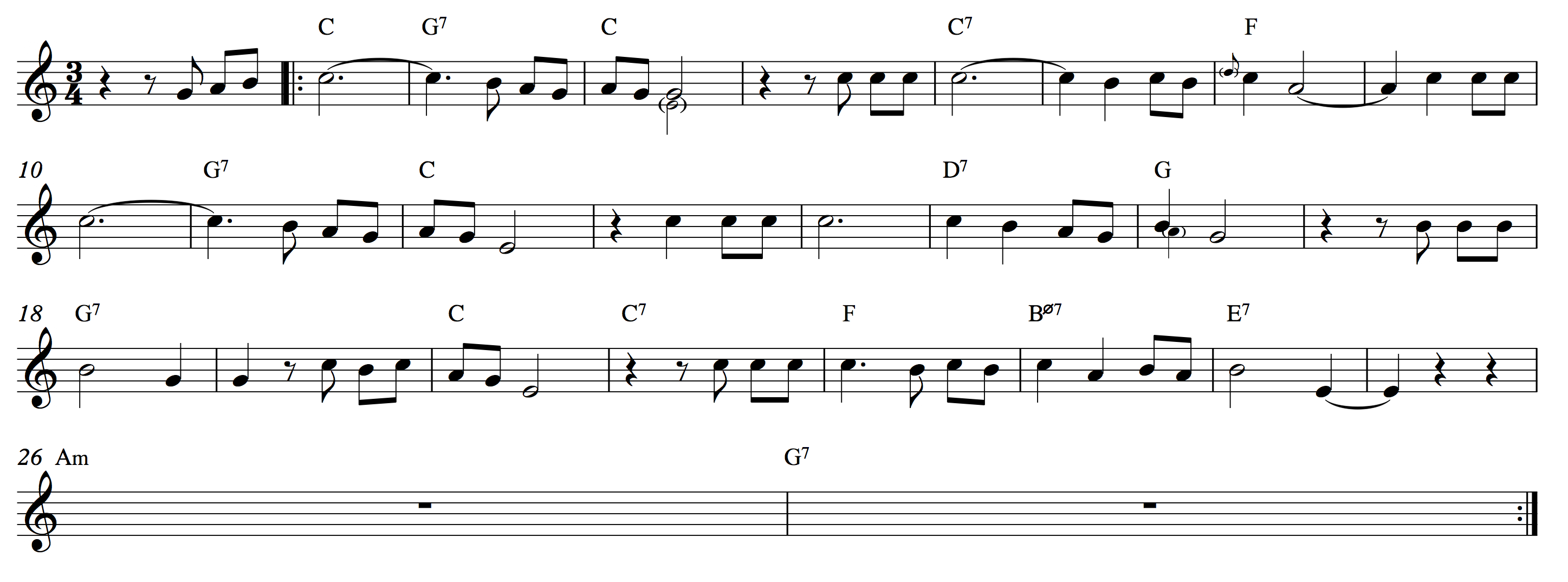
A melodic formula for singing the Venezuelan malagueña

The common melodic formula of the malagueña is largely realized in the interval between the dominant and the tonic, and features a variety of embellishments, as well as a unique melodic cadence -- at the end of phrases. The basic formula can be depicted as shown in the image.

A less common melodic variant of the malagueña involves a raised fourth scale degree when singing the first line of text and incorporates more leaps in the contour of the phrase. This variant has been used by artists such as Vasallos del sol, Soledad Bravo, and Cecilia Todd, and at times these versions of the malagueña are realized with sparser or simply no accompaniment.

=== Rhythm and Instrumentation ===
The meter of the malagueña is in 3/4 time. Unlike many other Venezuelan folk genres in 3 such as joropo and culo'e puya, the malagueña has less rhythmic ambiguity or complexity deriving from hemiolas. It is, however, lightly swung, meaning the eighth notes are not realized as completely even but in a slight "long-short" pattern. The mandolin and cuatro both perform a consistent ostinato, involving a flourish of notes starting on the first beat, a simple accented quarter note on the second beat, and two eighth notes starting on the third beat, the latter of which is accented.

== See also ==
- Venezuelan music
- Malagueñas (flamenco style)
- Polo (music)
- Fulía
