= Fulía =

The term fulía refers to a variety of folk genres in Venezuela generally performed as part of the vigils of the Cruz de Mayo. Of these genres, there are two that are especially prominent: the fulía central (spanning the coastal areas of the Capital, Central, and Central-Western regions, notably Barlovento) and the fulía oriental (Spanish:"Eastern fulía") or cumanesa (Spanish: "from Cumaná") (endemic to the states of Sucre and Nueva Esparta).

== History and Etymology ==
The name and origins of the fulía can both be traced back to the Canarian folía, which in turn is a folkloric derivation of a harmonic formula common in Renaissance and Baroque style by the same name. Though this initial classical folía bears little resemblance to its Venezuelan descendant, there are some elements that have been preserved throughout the centuries, such as the tonicization to both the relative minor and major (as in a Romanesca progression). The folía of the Canary Islands, however, begins to show more commonalities with some Venezuelan variants. In the Canarian tradition, for example, the singer begins each verse on the major section and ends on the minor, as opposed to the classical form, which begins on the minor. The start of the verses on the major mode is the common way of beginning fulía central.

Further evidence to the link between the Renaissance folia and the fulía is that "fulia" was a common Italian spelling of folia.

Though the fulía oriental is primarily influenced by these Spanish and Canarian roots, as evidenced by similarities in instrumentation, harmony, and melody, the fulía central has been greatly influenced by Afro-Venezuelan music and traditions in conjunction with the European elements, lending to the vast aesthetic differences between both genres.

== Fulía Central ==
The fulía central is native to coastal communities with significant Afro-Venezuelan demographics in the center and central-western regions of Venezuela. It is especially common in the states of Vargas and Miranda (especially the Barlovento region in the latter) and Caracas. The fulía central features a solo singer on the verses with a chorus that answers, and is accompanied by a cuatro, maracas, and percussion that varies between locations. In the region of Barlovento, the traditional percussive accompaniment to the fulía involves three cylindrical drums called the prima ("first"), the cruzao ("crossed"), and the pujao ("pushed"). these three drums are made have a body made of ceibo de lana wood or other lightweight woods, with a slightly hourglass bore and cow skin drum heads on both ends. Each is performed by one player with the drum between their legs, one hand striking the drumhead directly and the other striking with a short wooden mallet. Evidently, the materials, construction, and performance techniques of these three drums are very similar to those of the culo'e puya, another genre endemic to Barlovento, with the key difference that the fulía drums are smaller than the culo'e puya drums and that the rhythms they perform are different.

=== The Fulía and the Décima ===
The fulía central is performed specifically in vigils of the Cruz de Mayo (Spanish for "Cross of May"), at the moment of the ceremony after the cross, typically made from wood, has been decorated with flowers and colorful fabrics and has been covered by a white shroud. Then, the congregation begins singing fulías for the entire vigil, with members alternating verses. Despite the rhythmic nature of the music and similarities to folk genres that are danced, the fulía typically does not involve dance out of respect for the cross.

Occasionally, the music will be interrupted with a member from the crowd shouting ¡hasta ahí! ("Stop right there!"). This is followed by recitations of décimas, a Spanish poetic form with ten octosyllabic lines, which may or may not be improvised. These décimas, much like the text of the fulías themselves, can have varying themes. Some, such as the one performed by David Araujo (text below), involve praising the cross and have a clear religious focus:

Silencio pido, señores,
Porque voy a saludar
El engalanado altar
lucido con lindas flores.
Saludo a los trovadores
Que entonarán las fulías
Y a la santa cruz en su día
Le doy mi salutación
Con fervorosa devoción
Santa cruz devota mía

Other décimas can be completely secular in text and themes, such as the following recorded by Luis Felipe Ramón y Rivera and Isabel Aretz:

Cesa, trovador, tu canto,
que te quiero contestar,
aunque acabo de llegar
de los confines de un campo.
Ya se que causas espanto
con tu canto placentero.
Pero probarte yo quiero
que no he tenido rival:
donde canta loro real
no canta cucarachero.

In the excerpt above, the poetic voice poses a challenge to another "trovador," or poet. Furthermore, Ramón y Rivera and Aretz comment that the last two lines of the décima were recited by the entire congregation, and every décima of the group similarly ended with these exact last two lines.

The décimas continue until somebody from the crowd shouts, ¡Dijo bien! ("Well said!"), upon which the fulías resume

=== Lyrics and Form ===
The fulía central is structured as a call and response between a soloist and a choir. The soloist performs in groups of four octosyllabic lines with assonant rhyme, typically ABAB or simply with the even lines rhyming. Below is a transcription of a verse from a fulía performed by the Grupo Madera:

A este publico presente
les voy a pedir un favor.
Colaboren con nosotros, por Dios,
en esta bella labor.

To which the ensemble would respond with "santísima Cruz de Mayo" (Holiest Cross of May). The form of the fulía, however, has some important variations from the pure poetic form. The soloist, for instance, will not perform the complete quatrain at once; rather, they will perform the first two lines, be interrupted by the choir, and then perform the following two lines. Furthermore, the first and third lines of each verse are performed twice consecutively, and each is preceded by a long sustained vocalization on the tonic or dominant by the soloist. The choir also sings more than just the refrain: the fulía central is characterized by the choir performing arpeggiated vocalizations for about six bars before the refrain. As a result, the excerpt above would be realized in the following fashion:

¡Ay!
A este publico presente
A este publico presente
les voy a pedir un favor.
Ololele lelo laila
Ololele lelo laila
Santísima Cruz de Mayo
¡Ay!
Colaboren con nosotros, por Dios,
Colaboren con nosotros
en esta bella labor.
Ololele lelo laila
Ololele lelo laila
Santísima Cruz de Mayo

The themes of the text can be quite varied, but often focus on the ceremony of the Cruz de Mayo itself, on love and heartbreak, or on everyday life in the town. The excerpt below is from the fulía "Gallo Pinto" compiled by Un Solo Pueblo, whose text focuses on the culture of cockfighting:

Pido campo en la barrera
Que voy a jugar mi gallo
yo voy a mi gallo pinto
Hijo de la quinta fiera
Y quién lo juega es un rayo
yo voy a mi gallo pinto

The refrain of the fulía central can be fixed or unfixed. If it is the latter, the refrain will typically follow the second and fourth lines of each verse.

=== Harmony ===
Unlike the fulía oriental, the fulía central does not follow a fixed harmonic progression. It does, however, have three particular harmonic formulas: one in a major mode, one in a minor mode, and one that starts in a major mode and modulates to the relative minor. Below is a graph outlining the basic progression of each of these modes:

Line	Major mode	Minor mode	Major and Minor modes
1st line	I V^{7}	i V^{7}	I V^{7}
1st line (repeated)	V^{7} I	V^{7} i	V^{7} vi
2nd line	IV V^{7}	ii^{ø} V^{7}	ii^{ø}/vi V^{7}/vi
Choir vocalizations and refrain	I IV V^{7}	i ii^{ø} V^{7}	vi ii^{ø}/vi V^{7}/vi
3rd line	I V^{7}	i V^{7}	vi I V^{7}
3rd line (repeated)	V^{7} I	V^{7} i	V^{7} vi
4th line	IV V^{7}	ii^{ø} V^{7}	ii^{ø}/vi V^{7}/vi
Choir vocalizations and refrain	I IV V^{7}	i ii^{ø} V^{7}	vi ii^{ø}/vi V^{7}/vi

=== Rhythm ===
The fulía central is played in a duple meter. Though it is often written in 6/8 or 2/4, the groove is difficult to accurately notate. However, an approximation of the patterns of the prima, cruzao, and pujao can be found to the right:

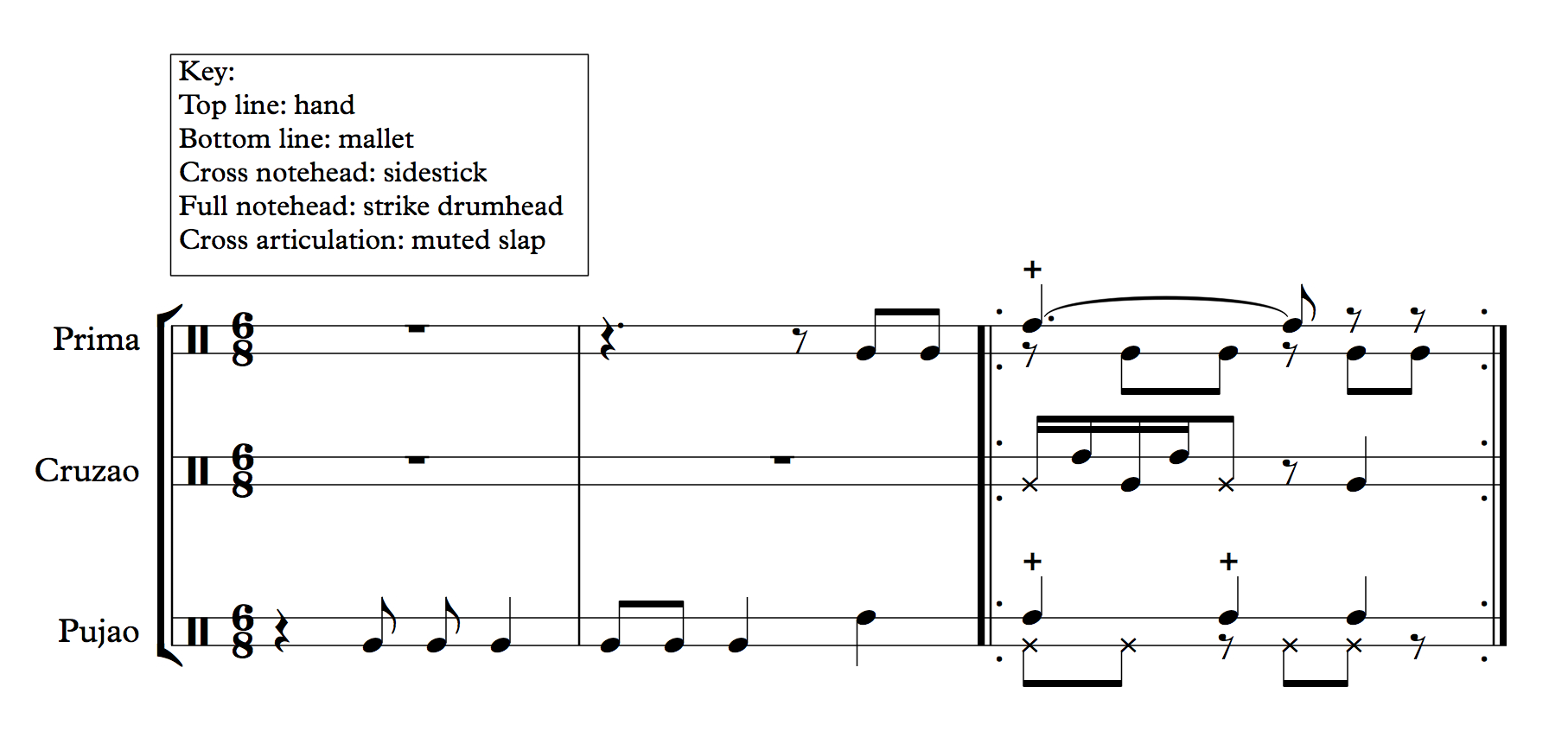

== Fulía Oriental ==
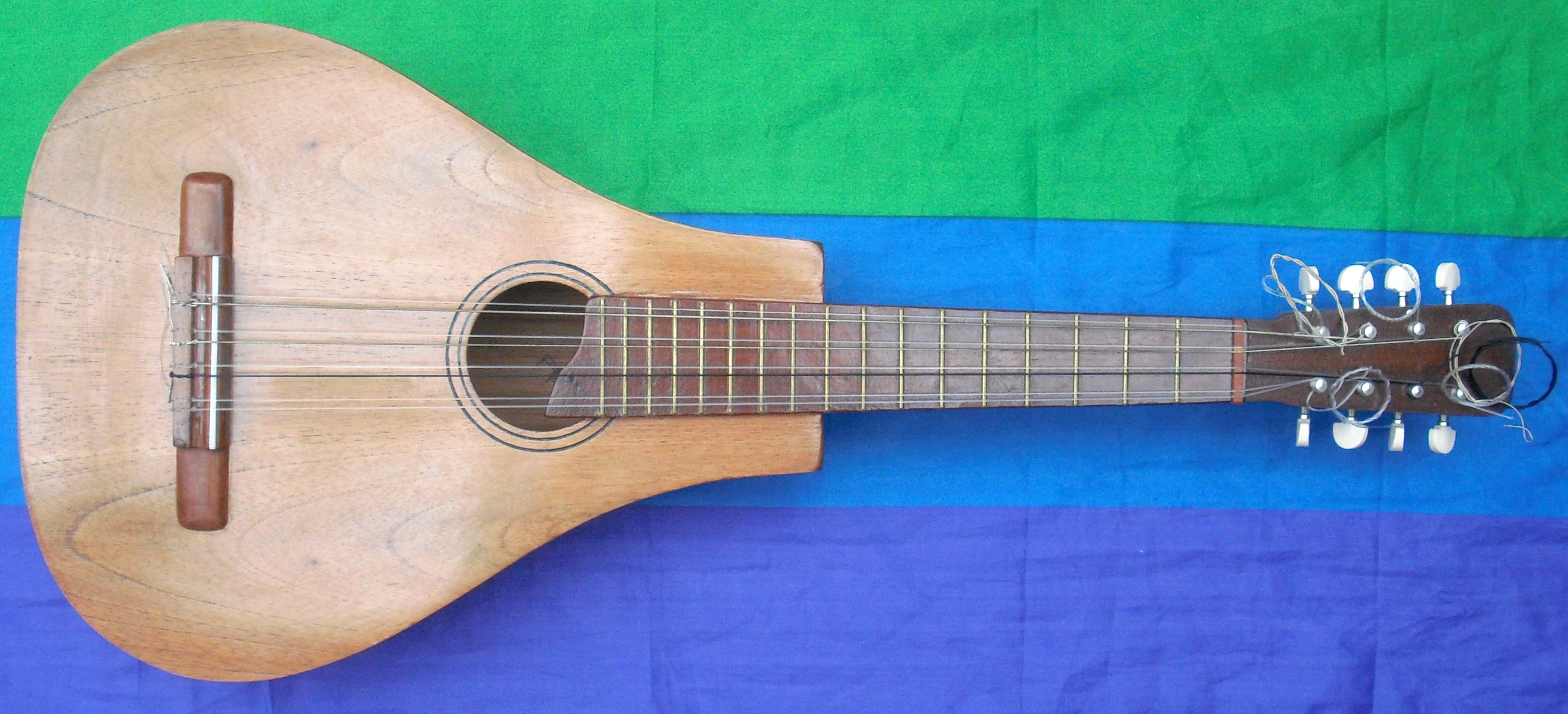
The Bandola oriental is an instrument unique to the Eastern Region and is often used to accompany fulías

The fulía oriental is a version of the fulía common in the states of Sucre and Nueva Esparta in the east of Venezuela, and it is especially prominent in the city of Cumaná and on the island of Margarita. Like the fulía central, the fulía oriental is performed as part of the ceremonies of the vigils of the Cruz de Mayo; however, it differs greatly on just about all musical parameters including instrumentation, rhythm, harmony, melody, and function in the ceremonies. In the east of Venezuela the music in the vigils is not limited to fulías, but instead includes other local styles such as the punto de velorio and the jota cumanesa. This results in the general form of the fulía oriental being more fixed than that of the fulía central.

=== Lyrics and Form ===
The fulía oriental is grouped in 4-line stanzas with 8 syllables per line, with the third line being a repetition of the second. Furthermore, each subsequent stanza begins with the final line of the previous. This poetic form can be seen in the example below of some popular stanzas of the fulía oriental, and is one of four eastern Venezuelan styles to be written in décimas:

Bendigo la santa cruz,
bendigo a quien la adornó.
Bendigo a quien la adornó,
quien en la cruz esmaltó.
Quien en la cruz esmaltó,
con ricas conchas del mar.
Con ricas conchas del mar,
Dime quien pudo esmaltar.

The themes of the lyrics to a fulía oriental are consistently focused on the adorned cross and the ceremony of the vigils, as seen in the example above, in which the singer blesses the cross and praises who adorned it.

Regarding the form, the fulía oriental traditionally commences with a brief passage featuring the mandolin or the bandola, after which the first two lines of the stanza are sung. The mandolin answers the singer in a brief passage, and the last two lines are sung. Before the next verse is sung, there is an instrumental interlude that occurs that usually follows a similar harmonic and melodic structure as in the opening.

=== Instrumentation and Rhythm ===
Owing to its Spanish origins, the fulía oriental features a solo vocalist with an accompaniment of string instruments that may include any combination of cuatro, mandolin, bandola oriental and guitar. The mandolin and bandola typically perform an arpeggiating countermelody against the singer, while the cuatro and guitar provide rhythmic and harmonic accompaniment.

The meter of the fulía oriental is in 2/4 and may be lightly swung, but is otherwise clearly defined. The rhythm of the cuatro has seen some mild controversy, given that the way it is performed by local musicians differs from the way musicians not from the east perform it. Below is an example of the rhythmic pattern eastern cuatro players follow:

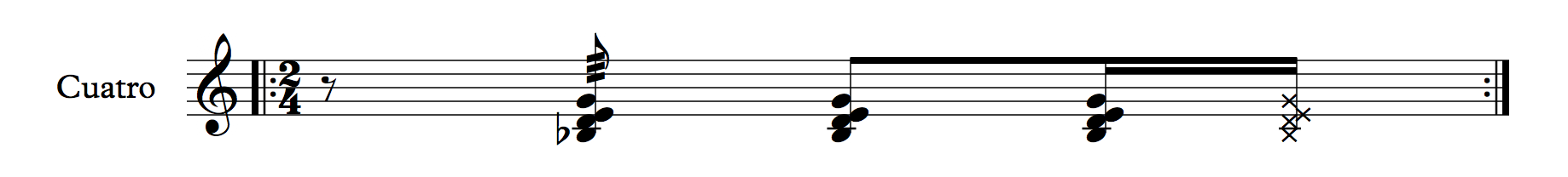

=== Harmony ===
The fulía oriental follows a fixed harmonic progression (shown below), and is frequently performed in G minor. This harmonic progression features a secondary dominant to the fourth as well as a tonicization to the relative major, and bears noticeable similarities to the progression of a classical or Canarian folia.

Line	Harmonic changes
1st	(i) V^{7}/iv iv
2nd	V^{7}/III (VII^{7}) III
Instrumental fill	V^{7}/iv iv
2nd (repeated)	V^{7}/V V
3rd	i V^{7} i

== See also ==
- Music of Venezuela
- Culo'e puya
- Cruz de Mayo
- Malagueña (genre)
