= Gilbert Chase =

American historian

Gilbert Chase (4 September 1906, Havana, Cuba – 22 February 1992, Chapel Hill, North Carolina) was an American music historian, critic and author, and a "seminal figure in the field of musicology and ethnomusicology." He was the maternal cousin of the writer and diarist Anaïs Nin.

His America's Music, from the Pilgrims to the Present was the first major work to examine the music of the entire United States and argue that folk traditions were more culturally significant than music for the concert hall. Chase's analysis of a diverse American musical identity has remained the dominant view among the academic establishment. He also "was the first to treat the music of Charles Ives and Carl Ruggles as important additions to the 20th-century repertory". Along with Robert Stevenson, he was among the first American scholars to study the music of the Americas, and his The Music of Spain and A Guide to the Music of Latin America were major works in the study of Spanish and Latin American music. The Music of Spain remains a seminal and much-used text.

Chase served as the cultural attaché in Lima (1950–53), Buenos Aires (1953–55) and Brussels (1960–63).

Chase taught at Tulane University, University of Texas, and the University of Oklahoma. After retiring in 1979, he moved to Chapel Hill, North Carolina, and died there, of pneumonia, in 1992.
