= Tamunangue =

Tamunangue is a folk dance in South America primarily Venezuela. It is celebrated in Lara State in Venezuela on the June 13 every year as festival to St. Anthony of Padua the patron saint of that state. It is usually begun with an invocation to Virgin Mary. It is combination suite of music and dance with drums. It is played with cuatro and cinco, and sung in two voices. The dances that form part of the Tamunangue are La Bella, La Juruminga, El Poco a Poco, El Yiyivamos, La Perrendenga, El Galerón, y El Seis Figureao It is a mixture representing native Indians, the Spanish and African traditions.
