= Trastrasera =

Chilean dance

The trastrasera is a dance typical of Chiloé Archipelago in southern Chile. It is thought, because of its similarity to Argentine dances, that it may have been brought to Chiloé by Argentine muleteers traversing the Andes with their cattle and goods.

The trastrasera is a simple dance that can be adapted as a rhythmic game even for young children. It can be danced by one couple alone, yet it is best performed by larger groups. The figures of the dance follow the lyrics of the song, which indicate the movements. Before the music begins, the couples enter the stage holding hands, the man slightly in front of the woman, who appears to enter timidly. Once the couple has arrived at their location, the man leads the woman in half a turn and places her in front of him. She takes her skirt with both hands, while he moves his arms freely to the beat of the music.

The dance follows a pattern of three quick steps in place, one beat per step, and on the fourth beat there is a raising of the knee. The pattern then repeats, starting with the opposite foot. All the figures are performed using this step, whether in place, advancing, or turning. The success of the dance depends on the uniformity of the dancers.

Because the dance originates in Chiloé, a region of intense cold and winds, both dancers are traditionally dressed in warm clothing. The woman dresses in a dark skirt and a brightly colored jacket. A scarf is tied around the head, with the ends knotted below the chin. She wears thick, dark-colored cotton or wool tights, and closed-toe shoes. The man wears dark pants, a striped shirt, espadrilles or boots with thick white tights that are folded over the pants. He also wears a poncho and a Chilote gorrito or beret.
