= Cuatro (Venezuela) =

Stringed musical instrument

Cuatro Venezolano
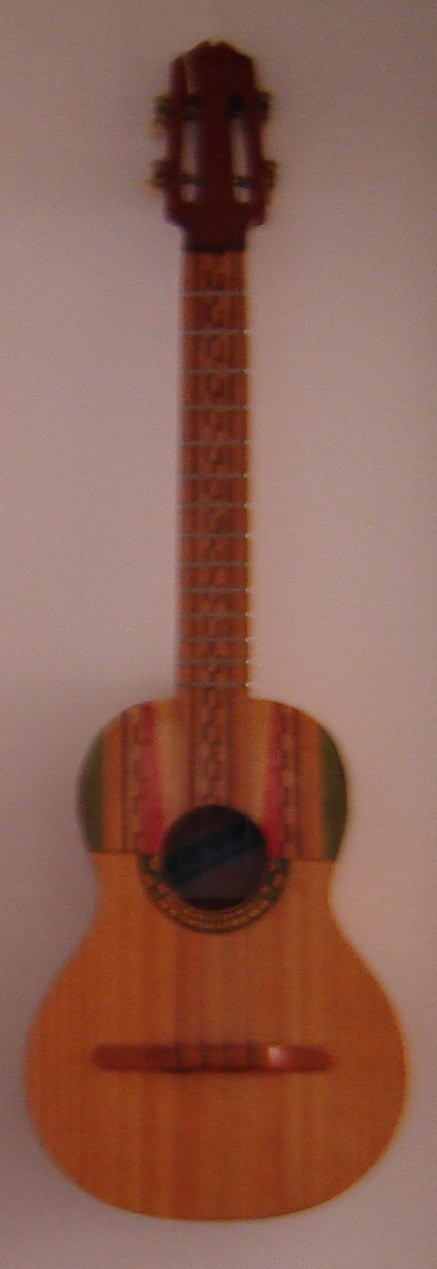
- Venezuelan Cuatro.

String instrument
- Other names: Venezuelan Cuatro
- Classification: String instrument
- Hornbostel–Sachs classification: (Composite chordophone)
- Developed: Venezuela

Related instruments
- Ukulele, Cavaquinho, Guitar, Bandola (Llanera).

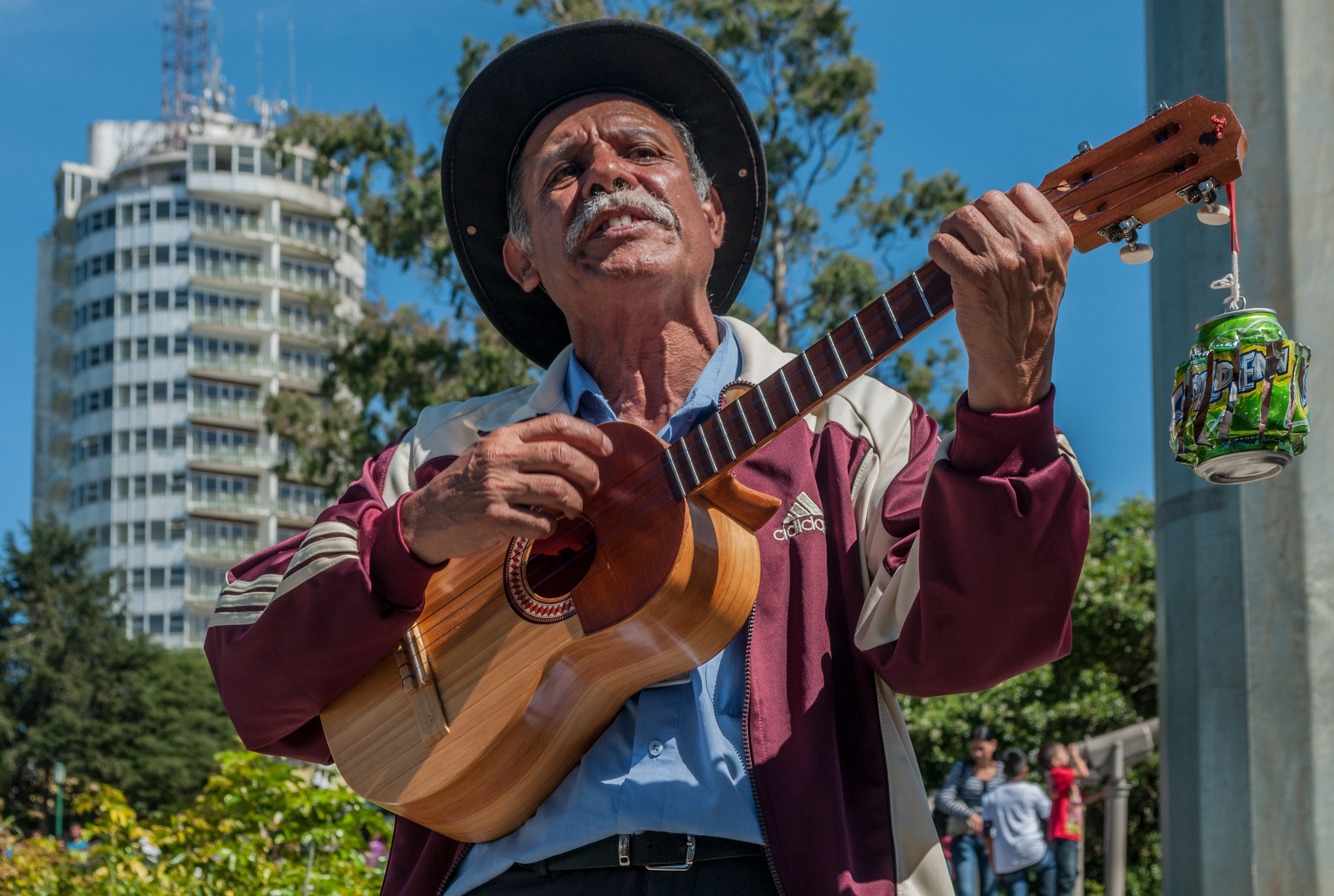
Street musician playing a cuatro

The cuatro of Venezuela has four single nylon strings, tuned (ad'f#'b). It is similar in shape and tuning to the ukulele, but their character and playing technique are vastly different. It is tuned in a similar fashion to the traditional D tuning of the ukulele, but the A and B are an octave lower. Consequently, the same fingering can be used to shape the chords, but it produces a different inversion of each chord. A cuatro player is called a cuatrista.

== History ==
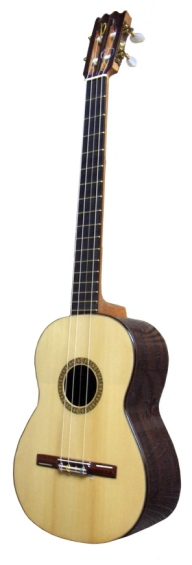
Venezuelan Concert Cuatro

The predecessor of the Venezuelan cuatro is the four-string Spanish renaissance guitar which disappeared in the 16th century after a short period of surging popularity. In the 1950s, Fredy Reyna documented the evolution of the renaissance guitar into the current Venezuelan Cuatro, and reinvented the cuatro as a solo instrument, equally capable of rendering traditional Venezuelan music as well as Renaissance pieces. The popularity of the instrument in Venezuela and elsewhere may be due to its apparent simplicity, having only four strings, as well as its compact size.

The design and quality of its construction may vary widely, from rustic, inexpensive instruments, to the custom-built Concert Cuatro, comparable to the finest Classical Guitars. The cuatro is often said to be the Caribbean version of the ukulele (although the cuatro was invented three centuries earlier), having a similar sound, looks, and tuning; and being used in Venezuela, Trinidad, and throughout various other Caribbean spots.

== Playing ==
The cuatro is particularly designed for strumming: the fingerboard finishes flush with the top of the instrument, and the upper half of the sound board is often completely covered by a scratch plate made from hardwood.

Most of Venezuelan folkloric music relies on the cuatro as its rhythmic and harmonic base. It is used in most genres of the different regions of Venezuela, such as Joropo in the Llanos, Gaita in Zulia, Galerón in the Oriente or calypso in Trinidad.

A recent evolution in playing technique has made the cuatro a versatile instrument capable of handling, on its own, solo parts including both melody and harmony. The technical and musical knowledge and expertise required to be able to play the instrument in this way is astounding. The results have made Venezuelan traditional music leap to a whole new level of complexity, many times encompassing the utilization of jazz harmonic structures and melodic phrasing to enrich many traditional tunes. The cuatro is used in waltz, joropo, parang, calypso, and soca.

== Tuning ==
Traditional Cuatro "reentrant" tuning A D F♯ B

There are several tunings possible on the cuatro, but they are mostly transpositions of the main tuning (below), which may depend on the accompanied singer's range or the tone of the harp the cuatro is playing with. The strings are tuned from top to bottom (using the numbers 1, 2, 3, and 4), to these intervals:

- strings 1 and 2 – perfect fourth
- strings 2 and 3 – major third
- strings 1 and 4 – major second

The most popular tuning for the cuatro is A D F♯ B, with the B string tuned to a major second interval from the A string (instead of the more "guitar-like" perfect fourth from the F♯).

Non-reentrant A D F♯ B cuatro tuning

In 1948, Fredy Reyna altered the way the cuatro is strung and broke with reentrant tuning. His cuatro, called "solista" (soloist), was tuned in strict ascending pitch order. After trying many tunings, Reyna settled on E A C♯ F♯ as the one he used the most. In doing this, he (inadvertently at the time) arrived at the stringing and tuning of the Renaissance guitar. His work has been meticulously documented by Reyna himself, but it has not been widely adopted.

A popular way to remember the tuning of the cuatro among Venezuelan cuatro players is to play each string individually from top to bottom, while singing the words Cam-bur pin-tón in the same expected notes of the four cuatro strings. (Cambur Pintón means Ripe Banana in Venezuela. The phrase is used mainly because its four syllables are long and because of its easy-to-remember nature). A variation is Hi-pó-cri-ta, playing the strings from bottom to top.

== The Venezuelan Cuatro in other countries ==
The cuatro is an important part of "música llanera", belonging to the Venezuelan area known as "El Llano". As such, el cuatro is widely used in eastern Colombia. El cuatro is also used in Trinidad and Tobago to accompany musical bands at Christmas time singing about the birth of Christ. This type of music is called parang, from the word "parranda," meaning "to make merry." Parang music mixed with a calypso flavor has found itself deeply rooted in the culture of the people of this Caribbean country. The language used in the songs is mostly Spanish but Patois and English are used as well. This richly adds to the rhythmic sounds of this versatile instrument. The cuatro, under the name cuarta, is also very popular on the Dutch Lesser Antilles, Aruba, Curaçao and Bonaire, where it is used for different types of music, including the traditional tumba, waltz, danza, polka, calypso, bolero, march and several others.

== Notable players ==
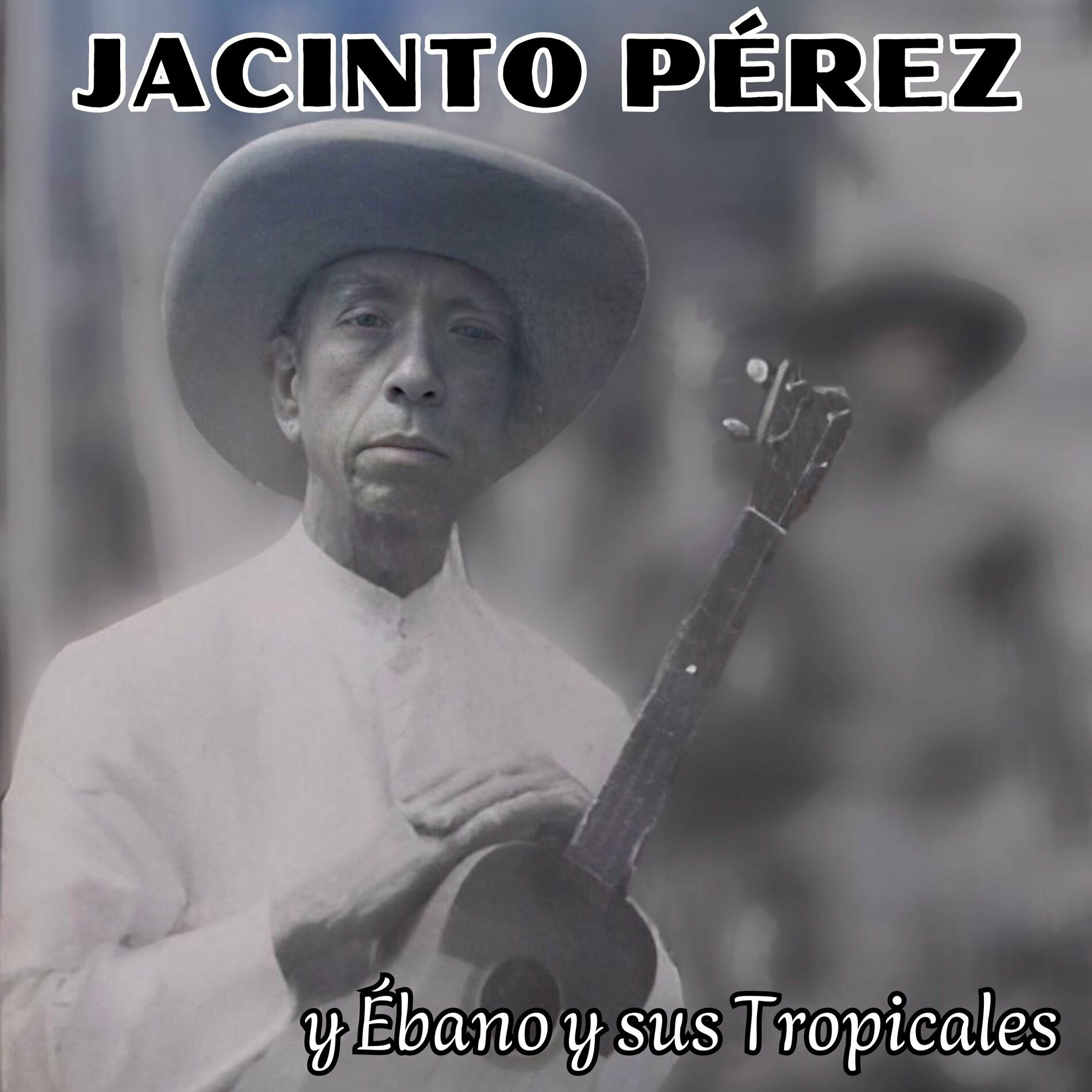
Jacinto Pérez called el Rey del Cuatro

- Simón Díaz – Venezuelan singer and cuatro player. While not a cuatro virtuoso "Uncle Simón" is the face of the llanero folksinger. His is the composer of "Caballo Viejo" and "El Becerrito"
- Hernán Gamboa – Founding member of Serenata Guayanesa. Left in the 1980s to pursue a solo career. Invented a method to play the cuatro called "rasgapunteo" (Spanish)
- Fredy Reyna – took the playing capabilities of the instrument to new heights, and created a method of teaching the cuatro. Famous soloist.
- Leonardo Lozano Escalante: Venezuelan master of soloist cuatro "cuatro solista" or concert cuatro, "cuatro de concierto". Lozano has taken this instrument to the well-deserved level of a soloist instrument composing, performing and recording outstanding works for cuatro and piano, cuatro and chamber orchestra, cuatro and symphonic orchestra.
- Roy Jelinek
- Cheo Hurtado
- Hernan Gamboa
- Jorge Polanco
- Jacinto Pérez called El Rey del Cuatro
- Jorge Glem
- Miguel Siso
- Edward Ramirez
- Luis Pino
- Hector Molina
- Proto López
- Daniel Requena
- Nil Lara
- Juan Carlos Salazar – Venezuelan singer, guitar and cuatro player.
- Henry Linarez – World renowned cuatro player from Barquisimeto that developed a fusion between Afro-American Jazz and Venezuelan Folkloric Music.
- Rafael "Pollo" Brito
- Steve Knightley and Phil Beer – Form the great British Folk duo Show Of Hands. Both can play the Cuatro with Steve writing and arranging classic British folk songs on the Cuatro.
- Dominic Thompson in Trinidad and Tobago
- Abraham Sarache in The Netherlands.
