= Margarita Island (disambiguation) =

Margarita Island, or similar spellings, may refer to:

- Isla Margarita, the main island of Nueva Esparta state, Venezuela
- Margarita Island (Colombia), an island in the Magdalena River, Colombia
- Isla Santa Margarita, Magdalena Bay, Baja California Sur, Mexico
- Margaret Island, or Margitsziget, in Budapest, Hungary
- Margeret Island (Panama)
- Margarita Island (Panama)
