= Steven Loza =

American musicologist and professor

- Born: August 9, 1952 (age 73)
- Education: California State Polytechnic; University of California, LA
- Occupation: Professor

Steven Joseph "Steve" Loza (born August 9, 1952) is professor of ethnomusicology at UCLA and Lecturer III in music at the University of New Mexico. He is an author of two books and editor of four anthologies in Latin music, including the first in-depth biography of Tito Puente.

Steven Loza has B.A. in music from California State Polytechnic University, Pomona, a Ph.D. in ethnomusicology (1985), and a master's degree in Latin American studies (1979), both from UCLA.

Taking a two-year leave of absence from the UCLA, he headed the Arts of Americas Institute in the University of New Mexico College of Fine Arts.

He has served on the national screening committee of the Grammy Awards for many years.

== Publications ==
- Loza, Steven (1993). Barrio Rhythm: Mexican American music in Los Angeles. University of Illinois Press. ISBN 0-252-06288-4.
- Loza, Steven (1999). Tito Puente and the Making of Latin Music. University of Illinois Press. ISBN 0-252-06778-9.
  - (Spanish language) (2000) Recordando a Tito Puente: el rey del timbal, ISBN 0-609-81079-0, Random House Espanol
- Musical Aesthetics and Multiculturalism in Los Angeles. 2003.
- Musical Cultures of Latin America: Global Effects, Past and Present. 2003. ISBN 0-88287-055-6.
- Hacia una musicologia global: Pensamientos sobre la etnomusicologia. 2005.
- Toward a Theory for Religion as Art: Guadalupe, Orishas, Sufi. in press.
- Loza, Steven. "Latin Caribbean". The Garland Encyclopedia of World Music. pp. 790–801.
