= José Barros =

Colombian musician (1915–2007)

- Also known as: "El compositor del río" (The river composer)
- Born: José Benito Barros Palomino; March 21, 1915; El Banco, Magdalena, Colombia
- Died: May 12, 2007 (aged 92) Santa Marta, Magdalena, Colombia
- Genres: Cumbia, porro, merengue, currulao, paseo, bolero, tango
- Occupations: Musician, composer
- Years active: 1930–2007

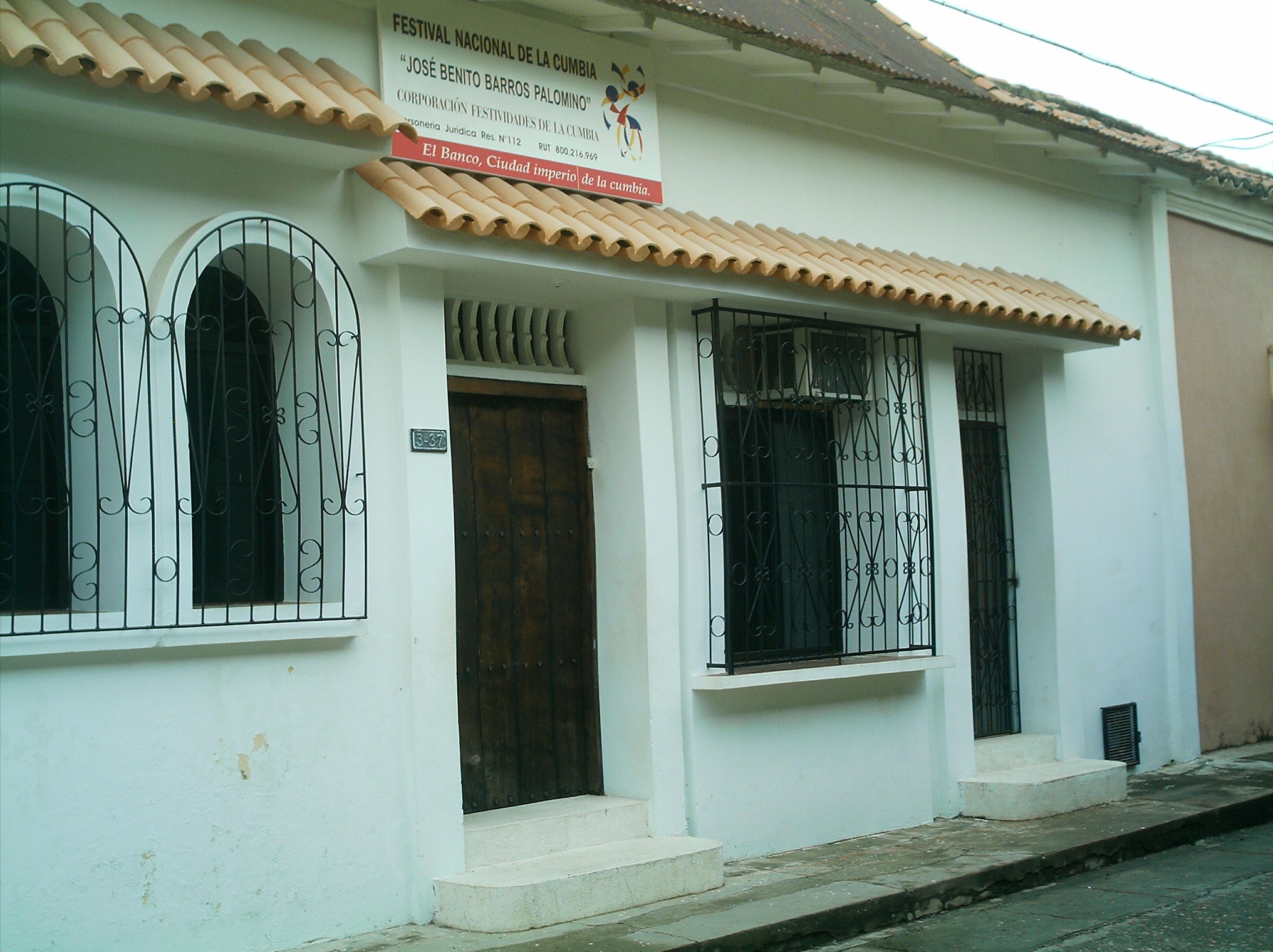
Cumbia festivities Corporation, José Barros house in El Banco.

José Benito Barros or simply José Barros (March 21, 1915 – May 12, 2007) was a Colombian musician and composer. He composed more than 800 songs in genres including cumbia, porro, merengue, currulao, paseo, bolero and tango.

== Biography ==
Barros was born on March 21, 1915 in El Banco. He was the son of Portuguese João María Barros Traveceido and Eustasia Palomino, and the youngest of five siblings. He didn't know his parents, who died in his infancy. He was raised by his aunt Clara Palomino. He lived with only one of his siblings.

To help support his household, Barros sang in his hometown central square and at homes of wealthy people. He learned to play a variety of instruments, especially the guitar.

When he was 17, he moved to Santa Marta. He planned to travel elsewhere, but was drafted for military service. After his time in the army, he returned to his hometown, but his desire to visit new places remained. He decided to stow away on the steamship Medellin, which came from Barranquilla and was bound for Honda, an important fluvial port close to Bogotá. He was discovered during the voyage, and was dropped in the city of Barrancabermeja. He met other musicians there, who had arrived in similar circumstances, and became part of various groups playing in pubs. He eventually moved to Segovia, Antioquia, to search for gold.

One year later, he arrived in Medellín, where he won a songwriting contest with a song called "El Minero" (the Miner). At the end of the 1940s he travelled to Bogotá, where he lived with drummer Jesús Lara ("Tumbelé") Pérez . He married Tulia Molano on June 12, 1943, who gave birth to a son, José, and a daughter, Sonia. He realized the music from his region was becoming increasingly popular, and devoted himself to songwriting. His first hit was his song "El Gallo Tuerto" (The One-Eyed Rooster).

His fame increased, and he was invited to countries such as Panamá, México and Argentina, which led him to write rancheras and tangos. Later, in Barranquilla, he met and engaged in a relationship with Amelia Caraballo, who gave birth to four children, Adolfo, Alberto, Alfredo and Abel Guillermo.

In the 1960s, after becoming ill, Barros returned to El Banco, and with a group of friends created and organized the Festival de la Cumbia in 1971.

In 1970, he began a relationship with Dora Manzano, with whom he had three children, Katiushka, Verushka and Boris.

Barros died on May 12, 2007 in Santa Marta.

== Compositions ==
- La piragua
- Las Pilanderas
- Momposina
- El pescador
- Arbolito de navidad
- Me voy de la vida
- Navidad negra
- El gallo tuerto
- El vaquero
- Palmira señorial
- Carnaval
- Pesares
- A la orilla del mar
- Ají picante
- El chupaflor
- El guere guere
- La llorona loca
