= Fredy Reyna =

Background information
- Born: April 3, 1917; Caracas, Venezuela
- Died: March 26, 2001 (aged 83) Caracas, Venezuela
- Genres: Venezuelan folk music
- Occupations: musician, cuatro performer, composer, arranger
- Instrument: cuatro

Fredy Reyna (April 3, 1917 - March 26, 2001) was a Venezuelan musician, arranger and performer, regarded as one of the two masters of the Venezuelan cuatro, which he elevated to the level of a concert instrument, and one of his country's most important cultural figures in the 20th century.

The young Fredy Reyna

== Discography ==
1. As a Cuatro Soloist

- Método de Cuatro - 200 fórmulas de acompañamiento - Caracas: Ediciones Fredy Reyna, 1956
- Cuatro Suites de “Cuatro” - Caracas: Ediciones Fredy Reyna, 1957,1958
- América en el Cuatro - Caracas: Ediciones Fredy Reyna, 1958
- Fredy Reyna - Solos de Cuatro - Caracas: Ediciones Fredy Reyna, 1972
- Fredy Reyna - Solos de Cuatro - Caracas: Ediciones Fredy Reyna, 1981
- Danzas y Canciones para los Niños - Caracas: Fundación Fredy Reyna, 1981
- Homenaje al Libertador Simón Bolívar - Solos de cuatro - Caracas: Ediciones Fredy Reyna, 1983
- El cuatro de Fredy Reyna - Caracas: Fundación Fredy Reyna, FUNDEF, 1994
- Homenaje a Fredy Reyna - Caracas: D'Empaire Reyna & Asociados, 1997
- Fredy Reyna, cuatro solista - Caracas: Deltaven-PDV, 1997

2. As a publisher

- Song
  - Carlos Enrique Reyna Serenata - Caracas: Ediciones Fredy Reyna, 1958
  - Morella Muñoz Canciones de América - Caracas: Ediciones Fredy Reyna, 1958
  - Conny Méndez A mi Caracas - Caracas: Ediciones Fredy Reyna, 1967
  - Paco Vera Cantos y Corridos - Caracas: Fundación Fredy Reyna, 1992
- Poetry
  - Aquiles Nazoa Poesía y humor de Aquiles Nazoa - Caracas: Ediciones Fredy Reyna, 1958
  - Miguel Otero Silva Elegía coral a Andrés Eloy Blanco - Caracas: Ediciones Fredy Reyna, 1958
- Piano music
  - Rosita Montes and Luisa Amelia Azerm (accompanied on the cuatro by Raul Borges, Ramón E. Azerm and Fredy Reyna) Piano a cuatro manos. Música instrumental del siglo pasado - Caracas: Ediciones Fredy Reyna, 1956
  - Luisa Elena Paesano - Valses de Luisa Elena Paesano - Caracas: Ediciones Fredy Reyna, 1969

3. As artistic director

- El Ultimo Cañón - Caracas: Sociedad de Amigos de la Música, 1956
- Tun tun In addition to artistic direction, Reyna played cuatro, scraper, furruco (Venezuelan friction drum), bells, pandeiro and sang background vocals. - Caracas Fundación Fredy Reyna, Dimagen, 1980.

4. As recording engineer/editor

- Alirio Díaz and Morella Muñoz Alirio y Morella: Canciones, tonadas y aguinaldos venezolanos - Caracas: Espiral, 1967
- Abraham Abreu Curso de Iniciación Musical - Caracas; Inciba 1968

5. As musical guest (solo cuatro)

- Selección de Música de Venezuela - Caracas Compañía Shell de Venezuela, 1957
- Serenata Guayanesa El canto popular venezolano - Aguinaldos - Caracas, 1976

== See also ==
- Venezuela
- Venezuelan music
