= Sama (Grado) =

- Parish
- Location within Spain
- Country: Spain
- Autonomous community: Asturias
- Province: Asturias
- Municipality: Grado

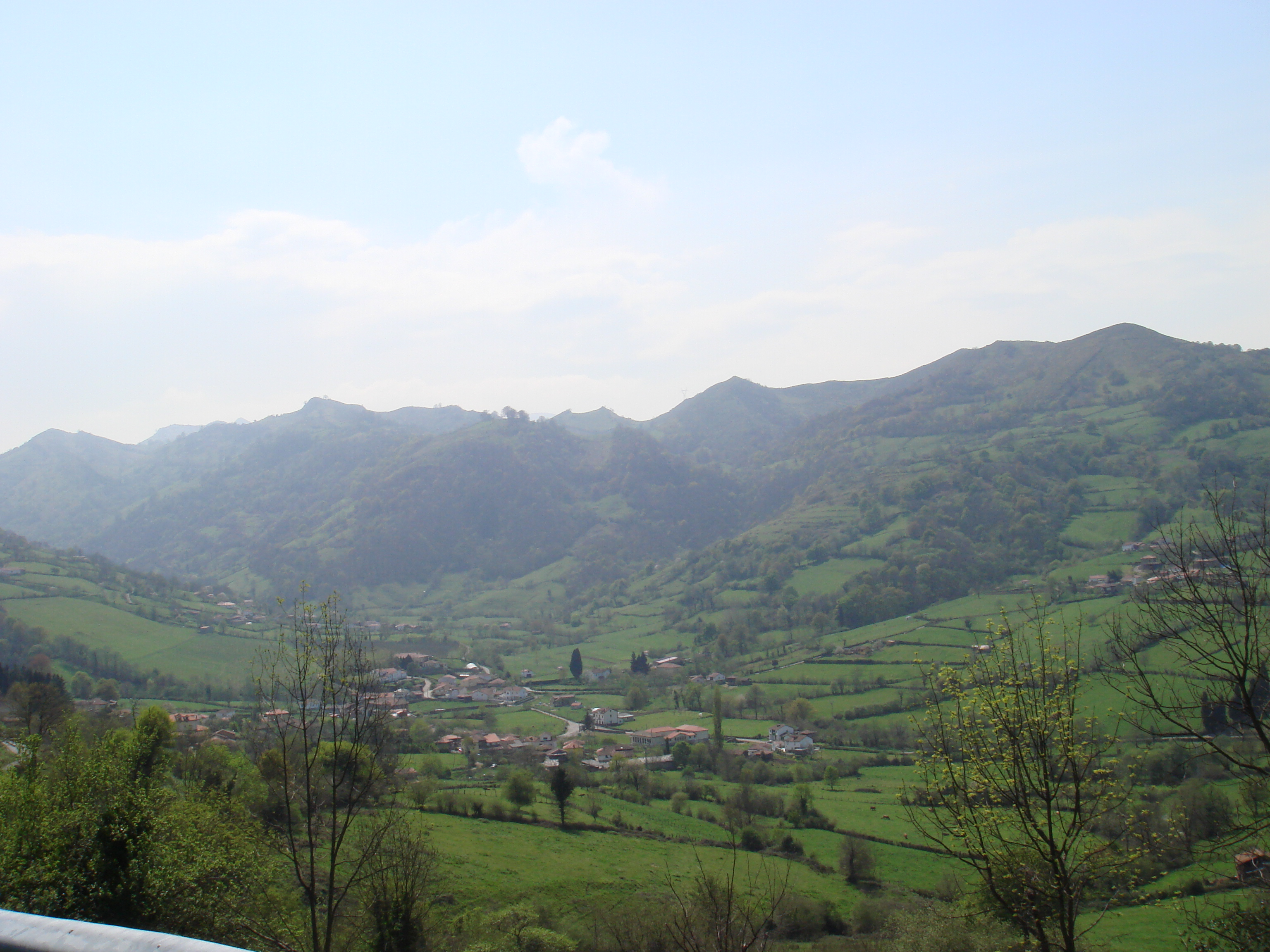
View of Sama de Grado

Sama (Asturian pronunciation: [ˈsama]) is one of 28 parishes (administrative divisions) in the municipality of Grado, within the province and autonomous community of Asturias, in northern Spain.

The population is 164 (INE 2007).

== Villages and hamlets ==
=== Villages ===
- La Corredoria
- Doróu
- La Mata
- Palaciu
- Pedréu
- Tresmuria
- La Veiga

=== Hamlets ===
- El Caleyu
- Canales
- La Casona
- La Cuchada
- La Espina
- Gadía
- La Morterona
- La Mouta
- El Pontigu
- Los Quintanales
- La Riestre
- La Rocina
- La Rotella
- Santa Llocaya
- Solacuendia
- Las Vallinas
