= Culoepuya =

Type of drum battery

The culo'e puya drums, also known as culoepuya, culo e puya, or culepuya, are a battery of small drums originally from Venezuela, with a Kongo lineage. They are used in an ensemble also known as redondo drums, after the dance motion and the circle which forms around the dancers during performance.

== Organology ==
Culo'e puya drums. From left to right: prima, cruzao, and pujao

The culo'e puya battery comprises three drums made of lightweight wood from the tree known locally as lano or ceiba de lana (Ceiba pentandra, a member of the Bombacaceae family, to which Balsa also belongs). Both ends have skin heads, which are joined with tensors made of rope (nylon rope is commonly used today). The drums are roughly 1.5 m (4 ft.) in length and between 10 and 15 cm (4-6 inches) in diameter.

The inside of the drum is carved in the shape of an hourglass, instead of a cylinder.

There are three different diameters, each corresponding to a distinct "voice" or pattern. The different diameters are known as:

- Prima - The smallest. Also called hembra (female) or quitimba or quichimba (a word of probable African origin, but whose exact meaning has been lost).
- Cruzao - The middle diameter drum. The name means "hybrid" or "crossed".
- Pujao - The largest diameter. Also called macho (male). The word pujao is a vernacular misspelling of the past participle of the verb pujar, which means to struggle, to push, or (colloquially, in South America) to moan as a result of extreme effort.

== Playing technique ==
Redondo drums are held between the player's legs and played with a stick in one hand and the fingers of the other (bare) hand. There are six basic strokes:

1. Open stroke with bare hand.
2. Closed stroke with bare hand's fingertips.
3. Bass stroke with the heel of the bare hand.
4. Open stroke with stick on drum head.
5. Closed stroke with stick on drum head.
6. Side stick.

Tonada de Culo'e Puya de Tacarigüita
The first 30 seconds of a song accompanied by a Culo'e Puya battery. From the town of Tacarigüita in Barlovento, Venezuela.

== Rhythms ==
Drum pattern from Curiepe

Culo'e Puya drums are typical of the Barlovento region of North-central Venezuela. They are most commonly used in the festivities of the Summer Solstice/St. John the Baptist (June 24) as part of the Redondo ensemble, which also includes one or two maracas, voice and hand claps. The redondo players accompany the processions dedicated to St. John and play alongside it in an ensemble often called tambor pequeño or (small drum), to distinguish it from another battery of drums used during the St. John festivities, known as tambor grande (large drum), or Mina.

The basic pattern is usually notated in 6/8 or 12/8 time signatures. Each town in Barlovento has a unique way of interpreting the basic pattern and adds its own local variation, but in general, the prima carries the base of the rhythm and it is played on the upbeats, while the pujao improvises and the cruzao marks the downbeats. This contrasts with the role of the conga drums in the Cuban rumba, where the smallest drum is the soloist.

The pujao improvisations are centered on a set pattern, but they can achieve an impressive degree of variety when the percussionist is able to tune the drum while performing. This maneuver is considerably difficult, and it is based on the bass stroke to tune the drum down and a series of side hits to the edge of the drum head with the heel of the bare hand to tune the drum back up.

The Barlovento towns of Curiepe, Tacarigüita, La Boca and Mendoza still maintain the tradition of the Culo'e Puya, but their sound and unique rhythm has influenced the rest of the native forms of Venezuelan music.

== Commercial recordings featuring the culo'e puya ==
- The American jazz composer Henry Threadgill featured two culo'e puya players on his 1993 album Too Much Sugar for a Dime.
- Cuban pianist Omar Sosa included the sound of culo'e puyas in his release entitled Sentir.

== Bibliography ==
- Max H. Brandt African Drumming from Rural Communities around Caracas and Its Impact on Venezuelan Music and Ethnic Identity - published in Music and Black Ethnicity: the Caribbean and South America edited by Gerard H. Béhague - North-South Center Press at the University of Miami, 1994.
- Jesús Chucho García Barlovento: Nuestro Patrimonio Cultural - Caracas, Fundación Afroamérica, Centro Cultural BID, IACEM n/d

== See also ==
- Venezuela
- Venezuelan music
- fulía
