= Montalbanejo =

- Municipality
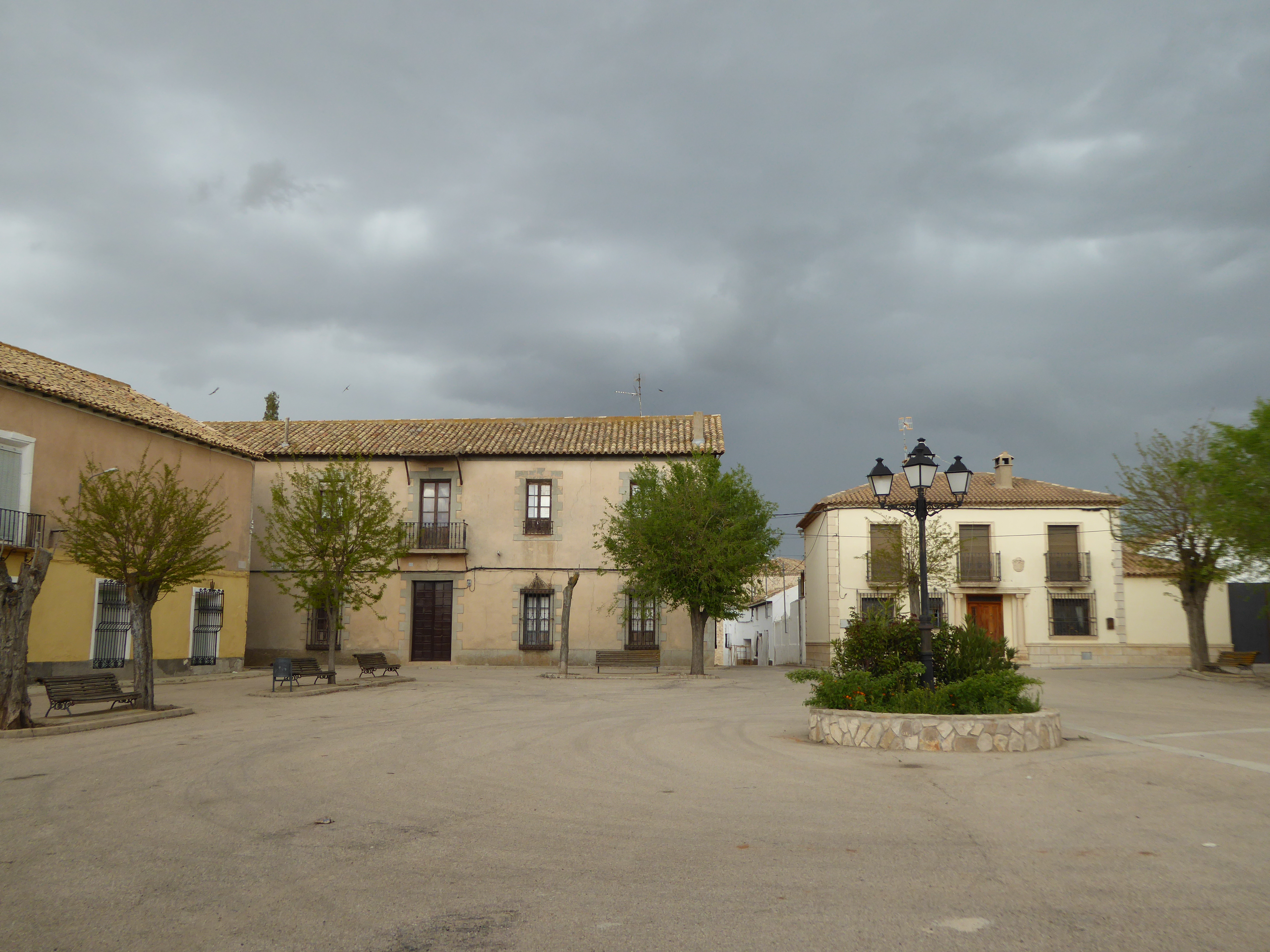

- Coat of arms

- Location within Spain Location within Castilla-La Mancha
- Coordinates: 39°44′N 2°30′W
- Country: Spain
- Autonomous community: Castile-La Mancha
- Province: Cuenca

Population (2025-01-01)
  - Total: 82
- Time zone: UTC+1 (CET)
  - Summer (DST): UTC+2 (CEST)

Montalbanejo is a municipality in Cuenca, Castile-La Mancha, Spain. It has a population of 87 as of 2023.
