= Granja de Rocamora =

Village in Spain

Coordinates: 38°09′N 0°53′W

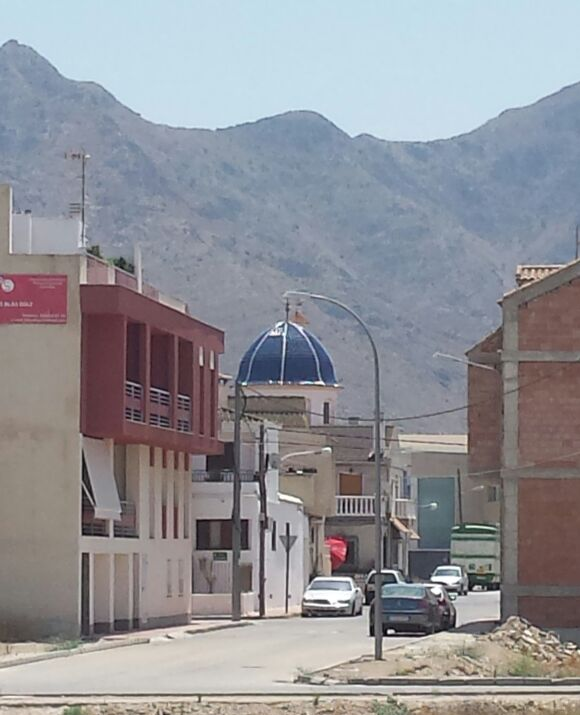
Granja de Rocamora in 2015

Granja de Rocamora's flag

Granja de Rocamora's coat of arms

Granja de Rocamora is a village in the province of Alicante and autonomous community of Valencia, Spain. The municipality covers an area of 7.2 square kilometres (2.8 sq mi) and as of 2011 had a population of 2,463 people.
