= Currulao, Antioquia =

Coordinates: 8°00′N 76°38′W

- Populated center
- Interactive map of Currulao, Antioquia
- Country: Colombia
- Department: Antioquia Department
- Time zone: UTC-5 (Colombia Standard Time)

Currulao is a populated center of Colombia of the municipality of Turbo in the Department of Antioquia. Currulao became a municipality by ordinance 13 segregating from the town of Turbo as a Special Portuary District. But some months later the Court of Antioquia said that only the Congress of Colombia could solve the lawsuit. Currulao has 21,048 people and 474 km².
