= Villalgordo del Marquesado =

Villalgordo del Marquesado, Spain
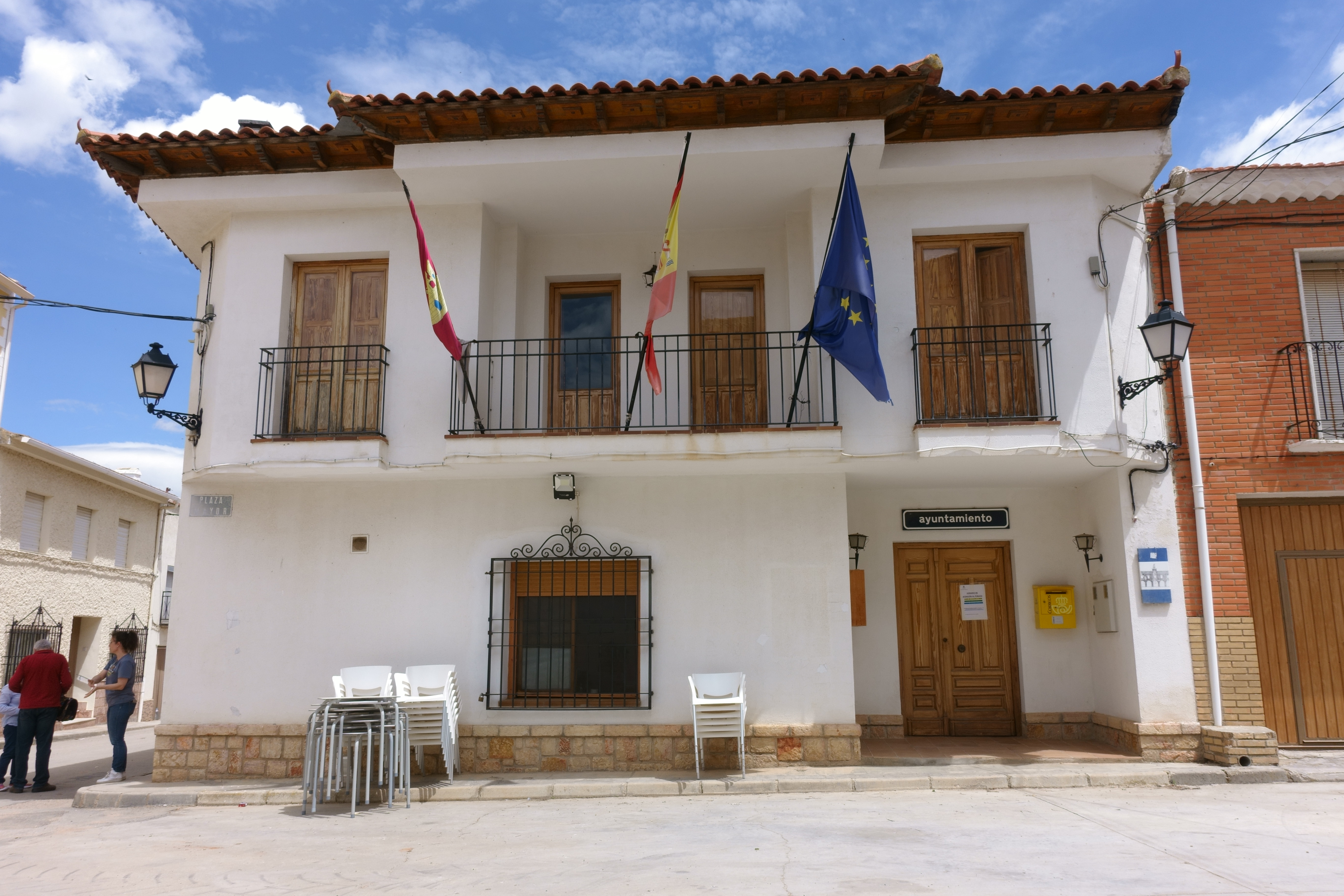
- Town hall in Villalgordo del Marquesado

- Location within Spain Location within Castilla-La Mancha
- Country: Spain
- Autonomous community: Castile-La Mancha
- Province: Cuenca
- Municipality: Villalgordo del Marquesado

Government
  - Mayor: Andrés Rubio de la Fuente ({PSOE})

Area
  - Total: 30.02 km^{2} (11.59 sq mi)
- Elevation: 800 m (2,600 ft)

Population (2025-01-01)
  - Total: 59
  - Density: 2.0/km^{2} (5.1/sq mi)
- Time zone: UTC+1 (CET)
  - Summer (DST): UTC+2 (CEST)

Villalgordo del Marquesado is a municipality located in the province of Cuenca, Castile-La Mancha, Spain. According to the 2004 census (INE), the municipality had a population of 114 inhabitants.
