= Galerón =

Is the major rhythm of the Venezuelan coasts

- Stylistic origins: Hispanic folk music traditions
- Cultural origins: Spread from Spain to the American colonies
- Typical instruments: Mandolin; cuatro; guitar

The galerón are two genres of Venezuelan typical song. The Eastern galerón is sung in improvised ten-line stanzas. Generally, it is accompanied by mandolin, cuatro, and guitar. It is normally played in the Cruz de Mayo celebrations, the improvised lyrics honoring the Cross. It is related to the guajiro (Cuba), torbellino (Colombia), and trova (Puerto Rico).

The other galerón is sung in the Center-Western region of Venezuela, more specifically in Lara State. It is part of The Tamunangue, a ritual religious celebration honoring Saint Anthony of Padua. It is one of the Sones de Negros suite, which includes La Bella, La Juruminga, El Poco a Poco, El Yiyivamos, La Perrendenga, El Galerón, y El Seis Figureao. It is played with cuatro, cinco y medio, also known as tiple venezolano, and guitar and sung in two voices.

== See also ==
- Venezuelan music

== Sources ==
- Luis Felipe Ramón y Rivera. La Música Folklórica de Venezuela. Monte Ávila, 1976.
- http://www.venezuelatuya.com/tradiciones/polos_jotas_y_galerones.htm
