= Rafael Antonio Curra =

Venezuelan ichthyologist

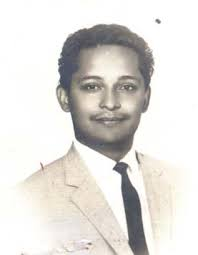
- Born: February 14, 1934; Ciudad Bolívar, Venezuela
- Died: December 12, 1968 (aged 34); Caribbean Sea, off the coast of Venezuela
- Burial place: Cementerio General del Sur, Caracas, Venezuela
- Education: Instituto Pedagogico de Caracas; University of California at Los Angeles; University of Edinburgh
- Occupation: Marine biologist
- Years active: 1957–1968
- Employer: Universidad de Oriente
- Spouse: Luisa Antonia Lava Sanchez (1961-1966)
- Children: 3

Rafael Antonio Curra (Ciudad Bolívar, Venezuela, February 14, 1934; Caribbean Sea, off the coast of Venezuela, December 12, 1968) was a Venezuelan ichthyologist and university professor. He is considered one of the pioneers of oceanographic studies in his native country.

He was an accomplished academic, administrator and scientist.

== Biography ==
Rafael Antonio Curra was born in Ciudad Bolívar, in the Venezuelan Guiana region, on February 14, 1934. A natural son and only child of a humble seamstress named Justina Antonia Curra, his mother took him to Caracas at an early age in search for a better life.

He was a disciple of teachers such as Elena Martínez, Alonso Gamero Reyes, Francisco Tamayo and Josefina Lopez Ruiz, and was part of an extraordinary generation of professionals in the sciences of the sea and other aquatic spaces that included Fernando Cervigon, Jose Celestino Flores, Francisco Mago Leccia, Pedro Roa Morales, Rafael Martínez Escarbassiere, Gilberto Rodríguez, Pablo Mandazen Soto (Brother Gines), Evelyn Zoppi, among others.

He studied at the Miguel Antonio Caro Teacher School, in the Caracas parish of Sucre, where he obtained a teacher's degree in 1952, which allowed him to obtain a job as Principal at the Cañada de la Iglesia Evening School in Caño Amarillo. He completed his college degree at the Pedagogical Institute of Caracas where he graduated with honors in Biology and Chemistry in 1957.

In addition to being widely recognized for many achievements at an early age, Rafael Antonio Curra stood out for his virtuosity with the Venezuelan cuatro.

Rafael Antonio Curra married his college sweetheart and colleague Luisa Antonia Lava Sanchez in 1961. She was the second daughter of wildlife breeder Pio Lava Boccardo, an Italian immigrant who managed zoological parks in Maracaibo and Maracay, and was the founding director of the first Caracas zoo, in 1945. He had three children: Luisa Alejandra (born in Edinburgh in 1962), Rafael Andrés (born in Caracas in 1963) and Miguel Antonio (born in Caracas in 1965).

His wife died at the Military Hospital of Caracas in 1966, as a result of acute renal failure.

== Advanced studies ==
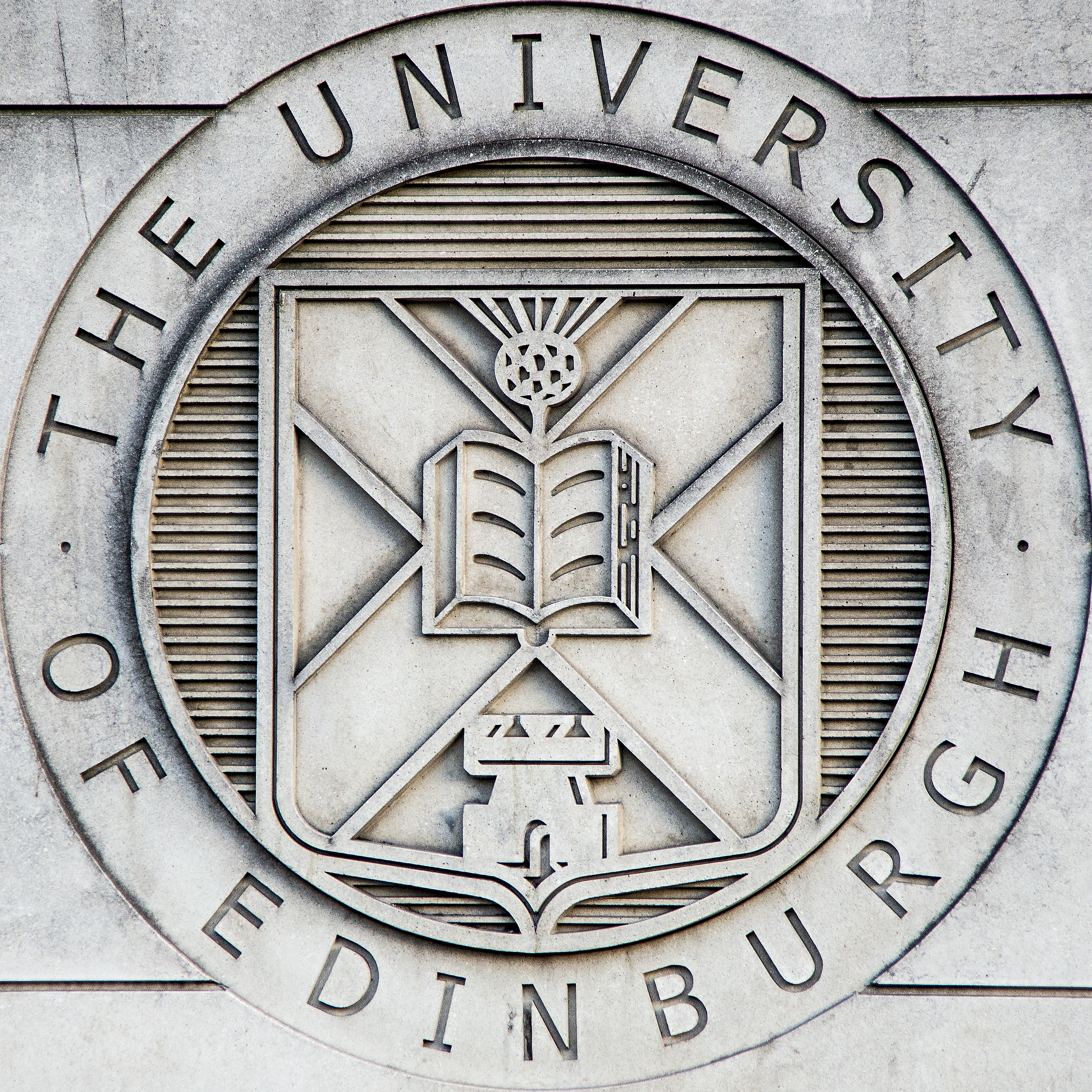
Coats of arms of the University of Edinburgh

After the Venezuelan Association for the Advancement of Science (AsoVAC) was founded in 1950 under the direction of the distinguished physician and academic Francisco De Venanzi, the concern for creating an oceanographic research center in Venezuela arose. An ambitious human resource training program allowed him to obtain a scholarship and attend first the University of Michigan in Ann Arbor in 1958, and then the University of California at Los Angeles where he received the master's degree in Marine biology in 1960.

In 1961, with the support of the doctor Luis Manuel Peñalver, founding rector of Universidad de Oriente, he began studies of ichthyology at the University of Edinburgh, in Scotland, where he obtained a PhD degree in 1963 for the doctoral thesis entitled "Ionic regulation in Austropotamobius pallipes (Lereboullet): Studies on the morphology, histochemistry and electrical properties of isolated gills" that presented the results of his research on European crayfish (Austropotamobius pallipes), a threatened endemic species of the British Isles.

== Oceanographic Institute of Venezuela ==
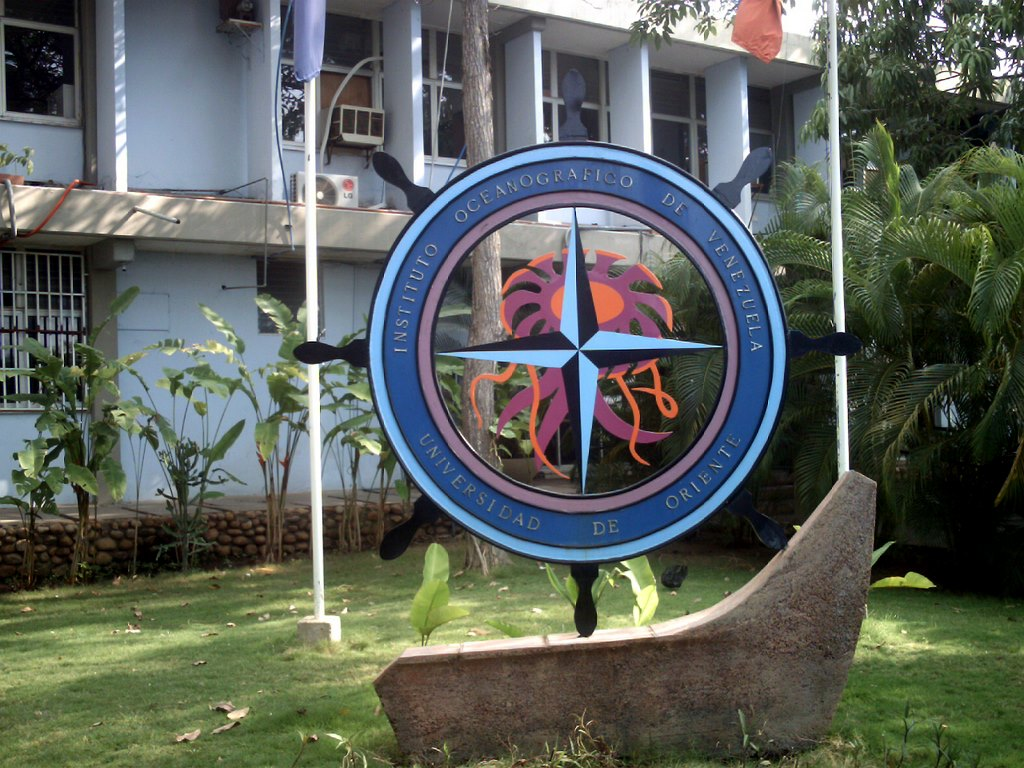
The Oceanographic Institute of Venezuela in Cumana

The Oceanographic Institute of Venezuela was created as a Branch of Universidad de Oriente by Presidential Executive Order 459 signed by interim President Edgar Sanabria on November 21, 1958. The institute began its work in the facilities of the Marine Biology Laboratory of the Ministry of Agriculture in Caigüire, Sucre state, and moved to its definitive headquarters at the Universidad de Oriente main campus in the city of Cumana, in 1963. Rafael Antonio Curra was part of the initial staff of researchers of the institute.

In mid-1963 he was appointed Head of the Department of Marine Biology of the Oceanographic Institute of Venezuela where he developed a creative work organizing seminars, expeditions, courses and workshops, and stimulating his colleagues, publications and attendance at national and international conferences. He was the editor of the Lagena scientific publication at the Oceanographic Institute since its creation in 1963.

In 1967 he was appointed Director of the Oceanographic Institute of Venezuela where he promoted relations with the main universities in the world, which allowed the arrival of foreign researchers to reinforce the faculty with a view to imparting postgraduate studies in marine sciences.

His role at the Oceanographic Institute of Venezuela, and the respect gained among colleagues and other collaborators at Universidad de Oriente, placed him as frontrunner to occupy the positions of Dean and Rector of his university.

== Intergovernmental Oceanographic Commission ==
The Intergovernmental Oceanographic Commission, IOC/UNESCO, is an organization founded by UNESCO founded in 1961 whose main function is to promote and coordinate the study of oceanography throughout the world. In 1968, cooperative investigations of the Caribbean Sea and adjacent regions were initiated with the participation of 18 countries with interest in the area, carrying out physical, chemical, geological and biological oceanography and fisheries work.

In compliance with IOC/UNESCO Resolution V-5, and by appointment of President Raul Leoni, the first Venezuelan representation to the International Coordination Group for Cooperative Investigations in the Caribbean Sea and Adjacent Regions (CICAR) was designated in 1968.

Rafael Antonio Curra, as director of the Oceanographic Institute of Venezuela, was appointed National Group Coordinator. The group was made up by the highly regarded deputy coordinators: Fernando Cervigón of the Marine Research Station of La Salle Foundation of Natural Sciences; Gilberto Rodríguez of the Venezuelan Institute for Scientific Research; Francisco Mago Leccia of the Institute of Tropical Zoology of Universidad Central de Venezuela; Captain Ramiro Perez Luciani of the Hydrography and Navigation Department of the Venezuelan Navy; and Jose Heredia Osio of the Fisheries Office of the Ministry of Agriculture.

== Death ==
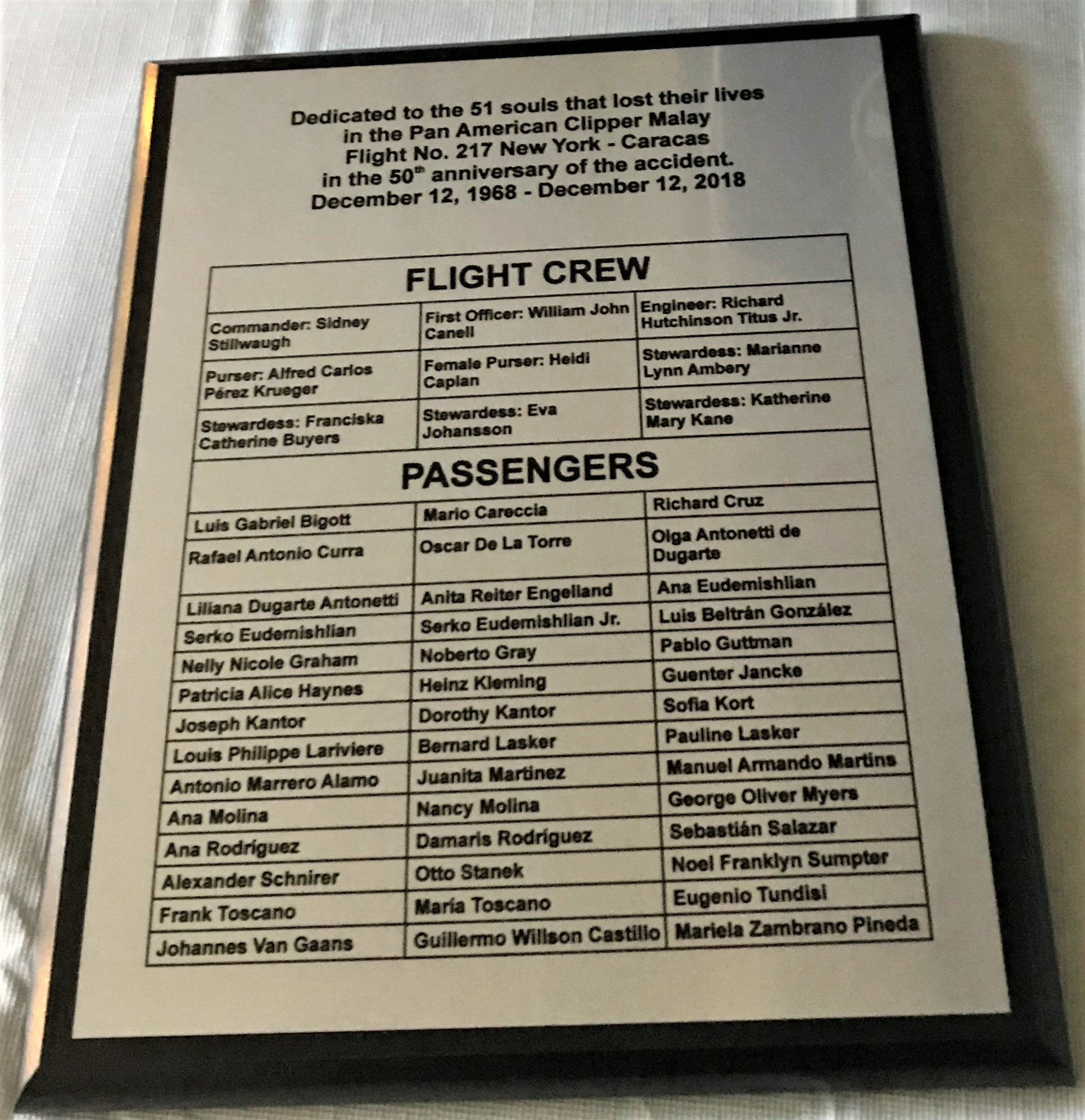
Commemorative plaque for the 50th anniversary of the Pan Am Flight 217 tragedy

On the night of Thursday, December 12, 1968, Pan Am Flight 217 from New York City to Caracas plunged into the Caribbean Sea at 10:02 at night during its final approach to the Maiquetía International Airport, causing the death of all its occupants including Curra. The Boeing 707-321B with registration N494-PA and named "Clipper Malay" was carrying 42 passengers and nine crew members.

The cause of the crash was believed to be pilot error, as a result of an optical illusion created by the lights of the city on an upslope. This caused the plane to crash into the sea and explode on impact, killing all on board.

Rafael Antonio Curra was returning to his country after establishing academic exchange agreements with authorities of the University of Rhode Island on behalf of Universidad de Oriente.

On December 12, 2018, family and friends of the victims of the Pan Am Flight 217 gathered at 301 West 57th Street in Midtown Manhattan to commemorate the 50th anniversary of the tragedy, and deposited 51 flowers onto the waters of the Hudson River in memory of the victims. A commemorative plaque with the names of all passengers and crew members was handed over to the administration of the John F. Kennedy International Airport, the former Pan Am base from where the ill-fated flight originated.

== Tributes and distinctions ==
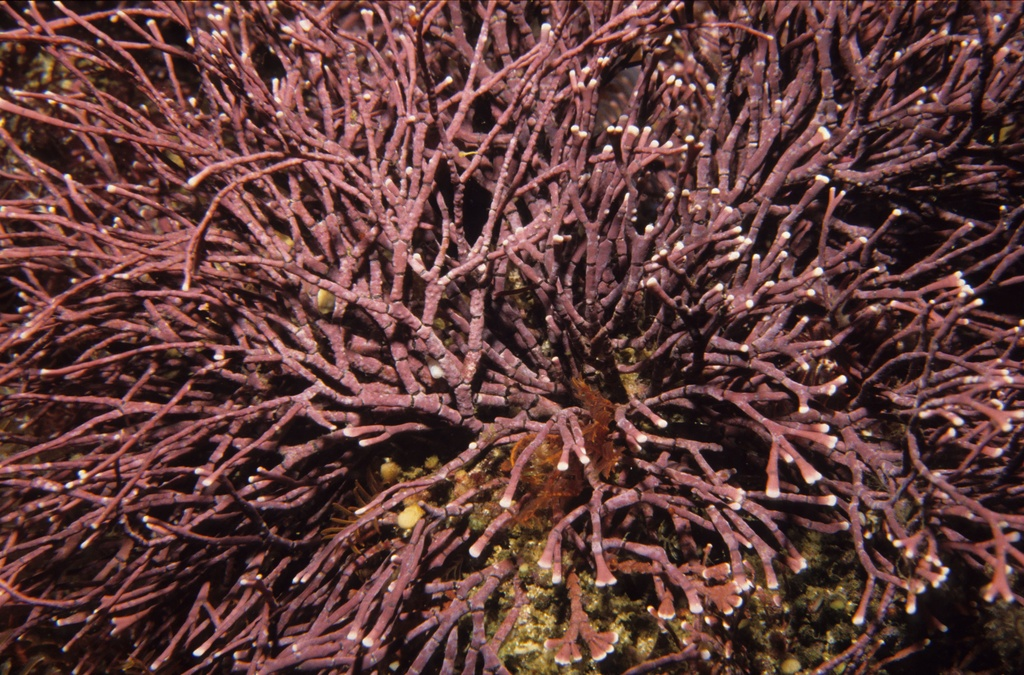
Amphiroa sp.

Upon confirmation of the death of Rafael Antonio Curra, the Board of Trustees of Universidad de Oriente declared three days of mourning, and ordered to raise the university flag at half-mast in all its university campuses.

As a posthumous tribute, the library of the Oceanographic Institute of Venezuela, located on the main campus of Universidad de Oriente in Cumana, bears his name.

The prominent Hindu philologist E. Kandaswamy Ganesan described and dedicated a kind of native benthic seaweed from the Venezuelan coast as Amphiroa currae Ganesan (1971) in posthumous tribute.

His life and work is described in the book "Lost lives of the Clipper Malay" by genealogist Lizzie Lee, published in 2020

== Publications ==
- Curra, R. A. (1961). "Notas sistemáticas sobre Urumara rondoni Miranda Ribeiro 1920 (Pisces: Gymnotoidei – Rhamphichthyidae)". Bol. Inst. Oceanogr. Universidad de Oriente, Cumaná, Venezuela: 1(2), pp. 474–482.
- Curra, R. A. (1963). Ionic regulation in Austropotamobius Pallipes (Lereboullet): studies on the morphology, histochemistry and electrical properties of the isolated gills (Thesis). hdl:1842/13526.
- Curra, R. A. (February 1964). "A Case of Negative Allometry in Austropotamobius Gill Growth". Nature. 201 (4921): 842–843. Bibcode:1964Natur.201..842C. doi:10.1038/201842b0. S2CID 4181155.
- Curra, R. A. (1964). "A brief note on the genus Rhamphichthys Mueller and Troschel 1846 (Gymnotoidei: Rhamphichthyidae)". Bol. Inst. Oceanogr., Universidad de Oriente, Cumaná, Venezuela: 3 (1/2), pp. 136–138.
- Curra, R. A. (1964). "Notes on the genera Apteronotus (Lacépéde, 1800), and Sternopygus (Mueller and Troschel, 1846) with a discussion on the zoological categories Apteronotoidea (nom. transI.), Apteronotidae Berg 1940, and Apteronotinae Berg 1940 nom. transl.)". Bol. Inst. Oceanogr., Universidad de Oriente, Cumaná, Venezuela: 3.
- Croghan, P. C.; Curra, R. A.; Lockwood, A. P. M. (1 June 1965). "The Electrical Potential Difference Across the Epithelium of Isolated Gills of the Crayfish Austropotamobius Pallipes (Lereboullet)". Journal of Experimental Biology. 42 (3): 463–474. Bibcode:1965JExpB..42..463C. doi:10.1242/jeb.42.3.463. PMID 5856538.
- Curra, R. A., Holt, D. E., & Bleiberg, R. (1965). "Experimental marine aquarium for the Instituto Oceanografico, Universidad de Oriente, Cumana, Venezuela". AMLC Proceedings. Recuperado de http://www.amlc-carib.org/meetings/procs/1965AMLC_Proceedings.pdf
- Curra, R. A. (1965). "Notes on the morphology of the branchiae of the crayfish Austropotamobius pallipes (Lereboullet)". Zool. Anz.: 174, pp. 313–323.
- Curra, Rafael Antonio (1965). "An Instrument for the Measurement of Angles in Ichthyology". Copeia. 1965 (2): 230–232. doi:10.2307/1440729. JSTOR 1440729.
- Curra, R. A., Fukuoka, J., & Okuda, T. (1967). "La oceanografía física y química en Venezuela". LAGENA. Universidad de Oriente, Cumaná, Venezuela: 15/16, pp. 51–74.
- Curra, R. A. (1967). "A Key to Genera, Species and Subspecies of Astacinae (Nephropsidea: Astacidae)". Internationale Revue der gesamten Hydrobiologie und Hydrographie. 52 (5): 793–800. Bibcode:1967IRH....52..793C. doi:10.1002/iroh.19670520508.
- Curra, R. A. (1968). "Contribución sobre los recursos pesqueros de las Lagunas de Unare y Píritu". LAGENA. Universidad de Oriente, Cumaná, Venezuela: pp. 17–18.

== Bibliography ==
- Gonzalez, Domingo (2005). "Semblanza de Rafael Antonio Curra". Boletín del Instituto Oceanográfico de Venezuela. 44 (2). Universidad de Oriente, Instituto Oceanográfico de Venezuela, Cumaná, Sucre. Venezuela: 145–146.
- Cervigón, Fernando (2009). "Mi visión del Instituto Oceanográfico de Venezuela". Boletín del Instituto Oceanográfico de Venezuela. 48 (2). Universidad de Oriente, Instituto Oceanográfico de Venezuela, Cumaná, Sucre. Venezuela: 85–88.
- Flores, José Celestino (2013). Pedro Durant: Su tránsito por el Pedagógico de Caracas (1953–1957) (PDF). Universidad de los Andes, Consejo de Desarrollo Científico, Humanístico y Tecnológico, Mérida, Venezuela. pp. 36–45.
