= Cheo =

Cheo may refer to:

== People ==
=== Given named ===
- Cheo Hodari Coker (born 1972) U.S. TV producer
- Cheo Feliciano (1935-2014) Puerto Rican singer
- Cheo Hurtado (born 1960) Venezuelan musician

=== Nicknamed ===
- Jose "Cheo" Cruz (born 1947) Puerto Rican baseball player
- "Cheo" José Marcelino Díaz Marquetti (1909-1967) Cuban singer

=== Surnamed ===
- Cheo Chai Chen, Singaporean politician

== Fictional characters ==
- Cheo (Prison Break), a character from Prison Break, see List of Prison Break minor characters

== Other ==
- Chèo, Vietnamese satirical musical theatre
- Children's Hospital of Eastern Ontario (CHEO; Ottawa Children's Hospital) Canada
