= Ensamble Gurrufío =

Venezuelan folk ensemble

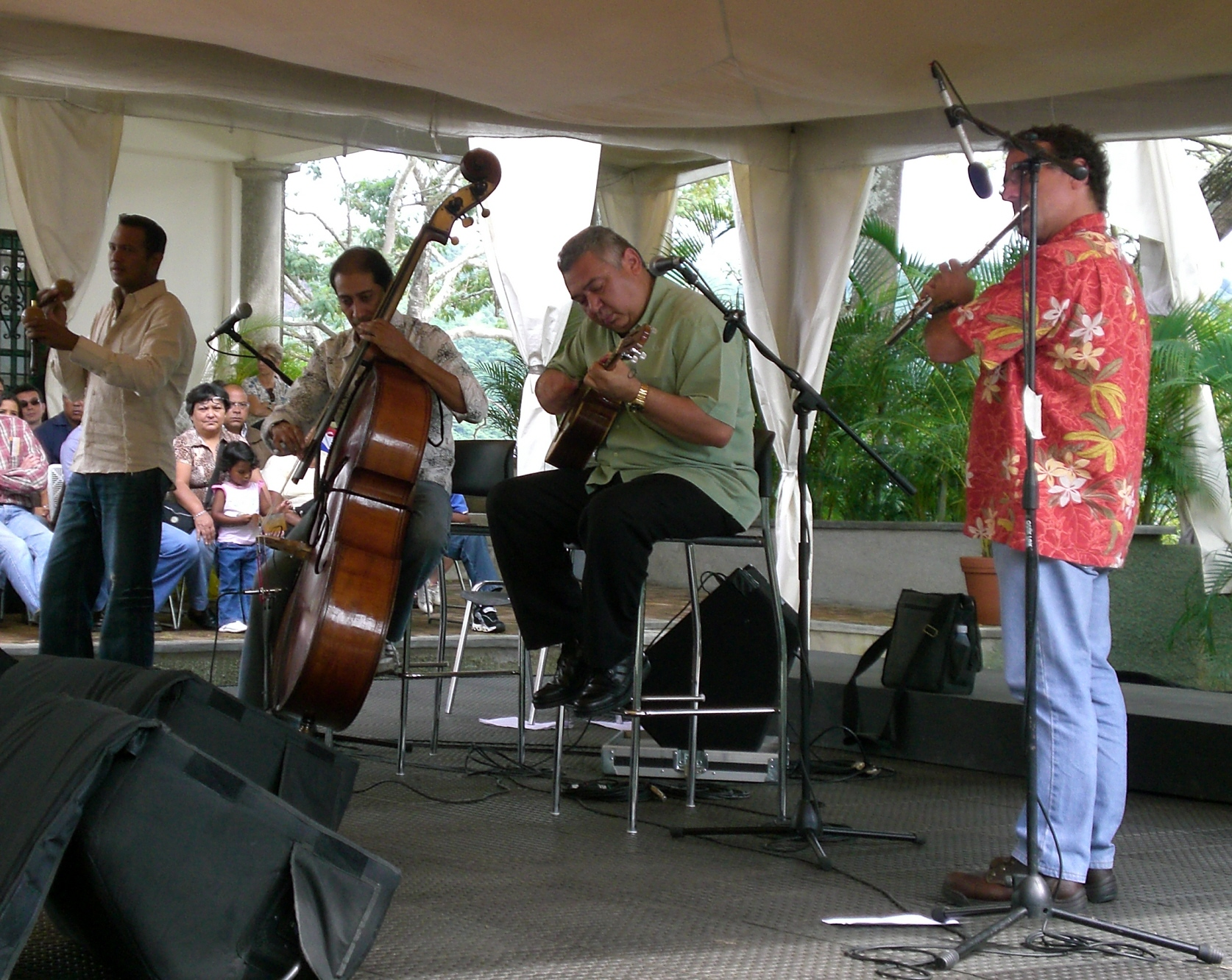
- (left-right) Juan Ernesto Laya, David Peña, Cheo Hurtado, and Luis Julio Toro.

Background information
- Origin: Caracas, Venezuela
- Genre: Venezuelan folk music
- Years active: 1984–present
- Labels: Sony Music, Independent
- Members: Cheo Hurtado; Manuel Rojas; David Peña; Juan Ernesto Laya
- Past members: Cristobal Soto; Luis Julio Toro
- Website: www.ensamblegurrufio.com.ve

The Ensamble Gurrufío is a quartet dedicated to the research, arrangement and reinterpretation of Venezuelan instrumental music. The group has won multiple awards both nationally in its native country of Venezuela and internationally.

== History ==
The Ensamble Gurrufío was founded on 1984 by three young musicians, Luis Julio Toro (flute), Cristóbal Soto (mandolin), and Cheo Hurtado (cuatro). David Peña (bass) completed the quartet in 1989. All four are academic musicians and teachers with considerable background as soloists and performers. A fifth member, Juan Ernesto Laya (maracas), joined the ensemble since 1998, when Cristóbal Soto moved to a permanent residence in France. The group has occasionally incorporated additional members, such as Jaime Martínez (oboe) and Moisés Torrealba (bandola).

The ensemble has performed in collaboration with other Venezuelan groups, such as Serenata Guayanesa, the Camerata Criolla, and the Grand Marshal of Ayacucho Symphony Orchestra. Similarly, they have recorded together with foreign musicians like Bela Fleck, among others. Ensemble Gurrufío has performed in over 50 countries and was the first Venezuelan instrumental group to have performed in Carnegie Hall in 1994.

In 2012, flutist Luis Julio Toro retired to devote time to other projects and was replaced by Manuel Rojas, a flutist who performed for multiple orchestras including the Simón Bolívar Symphony Orchestra.

== Repertoire and Style ==
Their live performances and recordings are characterized by the addition of long-forgotten pieces, rescued through research and interaction with other scholars experienced in Venezuelan music. The group also performs versions of "gaitas" or traditional Venezuelan music.

== Reception ==
Music critic Alex Ross, then working for The New York Times, attended Ensamble Gurrufío's performance at Carnegie Hall in 1994, stating that the group "illustrated the merengue, the joropo, the vals and other Venezuelan dances" and described their work as "complex pieces" that were "embroidered ... with deft improvisational touches".

== Awards and recognition ==
- 1998 Monseñor Pellín Award
- 1999 Venezuelan National Music Award
- 2016 Cacique de Oro Internacional Awards - Nominated for Best Fusion Folklore Singer or Grouping

== Discography ==
- Maroa (1993)
- Cruzao (1994)
- El Trabadeos (1997)
- Cosas del ayer (1998)
- Ensamble Gurrufío con la orquesta Sinfónica Gran Mariscal de Ayacucho (1999)
- Ensamble Gurrufío en vivo (1999)
- Sesiones con Moisés Torrealba (2002)
- El Reto (2004)
- Riqui, Riqui, Riqui Ran (2005)
- Sesiones con Hamilton de Holanda (2009)
- Sesiones con Alfredo Naranjo (2009)
