= Iván Pérez =

Iván Pérez may refer to:

- Iván Pérez Rossi (born 1943), Venezuelan singer
- Iván Pérez (water polo) (born 1971), Spanish water polo player
- Iván Pérez (footballer, born 1976), Spanish football forward
- Iván Pérez (footballer, born 1985), Spanish football midfielder
- Jorge Iván Pérez (born 1990), Argentine footballer
- Iván Pérez (footballer, born 1992), Spanish football leftback
- Iván Pérez Saavedra (born 2000), Spanish squash player
- Iván Pérez (Cuban footballer), forward for FC Camagüey
