= Oceanographic Institute of Venezuela =

Academic and research institution

Coordinates: 10°26′11″N 64°11′47″W

- Instituto Oceanográfico de Venezuela
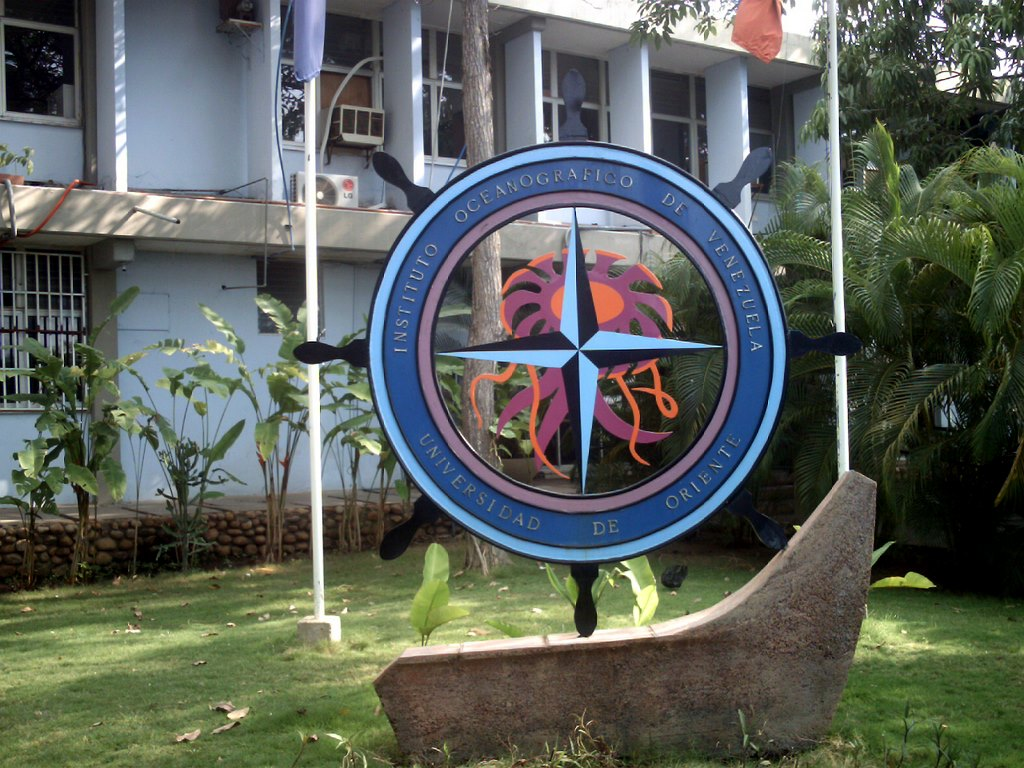
- Type: Public university and research center
- Established: 1958
- Affiliations: (Venezuela) Universidad de Oriente
- Director: Dr. Maydé Jiménez Prieto
- Location: (Venezuela) Cumana, Venezuela

The Oceanographic Institute of Venezuela (in Spanish: Instituto Oceanográfico de Venezuela, IOV) is an academic and research institution within the Universidad de Oriente which specializes in applied research and teaching in the fields of marine biology, oceanography and fisheries science.

The institute is located on the Cerro Colorado campus of Universidad de Oriente in Cumana, Sucre. Its facilities include two buildings which house administrative offices, laboratories, classrooms, and the Rafael Antonio Curra library - a specialized books and magazines depository on marine biology and oceanography bibliography.

== History ==
After the Venezuelan Association for the Advancement of Science (in Spanish: Asociación Venezolana para el Avance de la Ciencia, AsoVAC) was founded in 1950 under the direction of the distinguished physician and academic Francisco De Venanzi, the concern for creating an oceanographic research center in Venezuela arose.

The Oceanographic Institute of Venezuela was created as a branch of the Universidad de Oriente by means of the Executive Order 459 of President Edgar Sanabria signed on November 21, 1958. The institute began its work in 1959 at the Marine Biology Laboratory of the Ministry of Agriculture in Caigüire, Sucre, and moved to its definitive headquarters at the Universidad de Oriente main campus in the city of Cumana, in 1963.

It is one of the oldest and most important centers for oceanographic and marine science research and teaching in the Caribbean and Latin America regions.

The oceanographic vessel Guaiquerí II was the IOV research platform. Equipped with all the necessary adaptations of a maritime laboratory, it was the means of transportation for the researchers and technical personnel to take samples of the marine flora and fauna on the Venezuelan coasts

The first director of the institute was Pedro Roa Morales (1926-1995), a Sorbonne-graduate in marine geology and sedimentology.

== Directors of the Oceanographic Institute of Venezuela ==
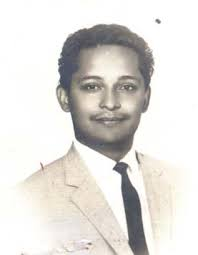
Rafael Antonio Curra, Ph.D.

- Felix Adolfo Balda Contreras
- Fernando Cervigón
- Rafael Antonio Curra
- Hugo J. Ferrando
- Fritz Gessner
- Luis Herrera
- Maydé Jiménez Prieto
- Ildefonso Liñero Arana
- Taizo Okuda
- Gregorio Reyes
- Pedro Roa Morales
- Johanna Fernández Malavé

== See also ==
- Universidad de Oriente
- IVIC
