= Pan Am Flight 217 =

1968 aviation accident

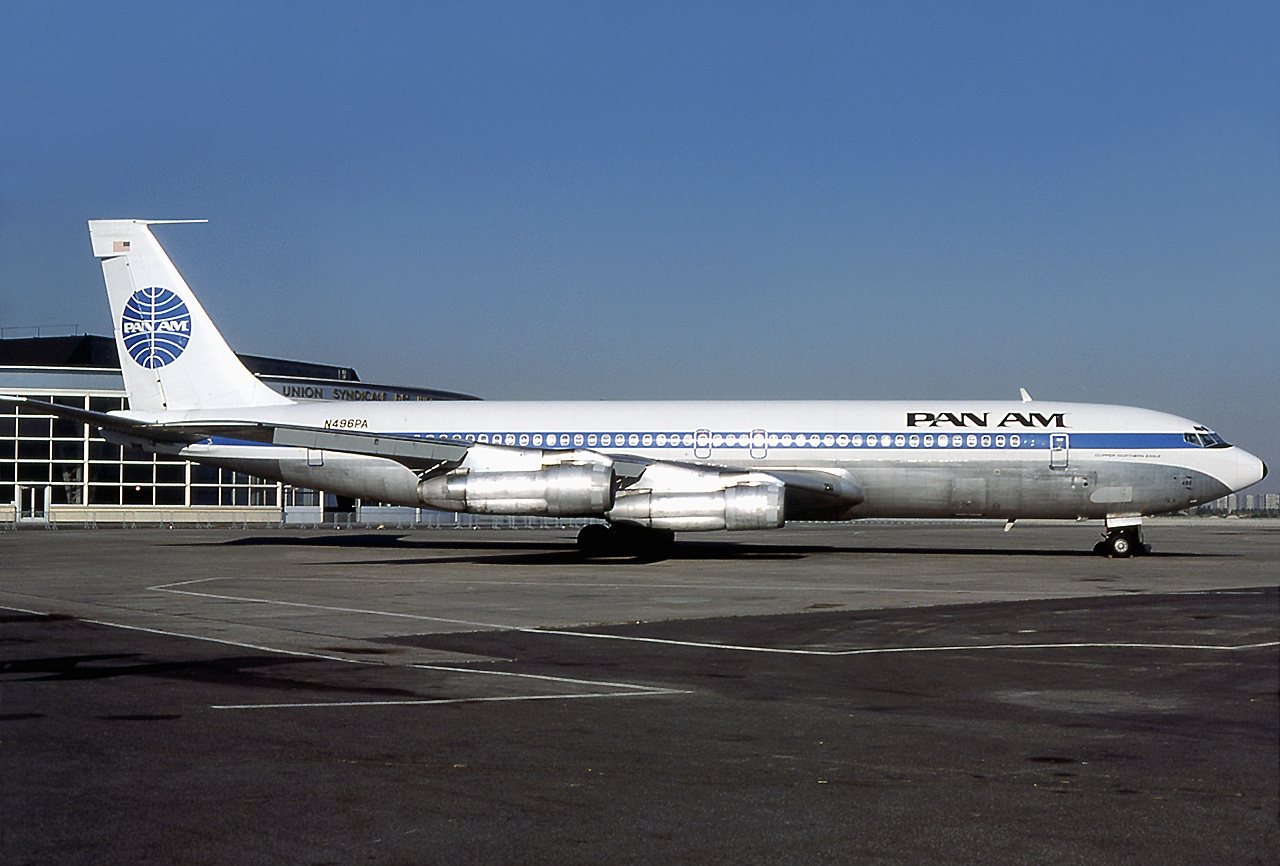
- A Pan American World Airways Boeing 707-321B, sister to the accident aircraft lost

Occurrence
- Date: December 12, 1968
- Summary: Apparent pilot error, not concluded
- Site: Near Caracas, Venezuela

Aircraft
- Aircraft type: Boeing 707-321B
- Aircraft name: Clipper Malay
- Operator: Pan American World Airways
- IATA flight No.: PA217
- ICAO flight No.: PAA217
- Call sign: CLIPPER 217
- Registration: N494PA
- Flight origin: New York John F. Kennedy Airport, United States
- Destination: Simón Bolívar International Airport, Venezuela
- Occupants: 51
- Passengers: 42
- Crew: 9
- Fatalities: 51
- Survivors: 0

Pan Am Flight 217 was a Boeing 707 that crashed near Caracas, Venezuela while on a flight from New York City on December 12, 1968. Though pilot error was to blame, the National Transportation Safety Board concluded the probable cause was undetermined. There were no survivors.

== Aircraft and crew ==
Pan Am Flight 217 was operated by a Pan American World Airways (Pan Am) Boeing 707-321B (registration N494PA, named Clipper Malay). The aircraft was less than a year old — its first flight was on March 7, 1968, and it was delivered to Pan Am on March 28.

There were nine crew members, including eight from the United States and one from Sweden. The captain was 50 years old and had 24,000 flight hours' experience, including 6,737 hours on the Boeing 707.

== Accident description ==
The aircraft took off from New York's John F. Kennedy International Airport on a scheduled flight to Caracas Simon Bolivar International Airport on December 12, 1968. As the aircraft was nearing Caracas, it disappeared from air traffic control's radar screens. At 22:05 local time, the aircraft crashed into the Caribbean Sea and exploded. At this point, a call was made to the Venezuelan Navy to search for the aircraft. Wreckage of the Boeing 707 was found 11.4 miles (9.9 nmi; 18.3 km) from Caracas. All 51 passengers and crew died in the crash.

Various aircraft and boats, both naval and civilian, were employed in the search and recovery operation. Some reports stated that many bodies were eaten by sharks. The crash was the deadliest aviation disaster to occur in Venezuela up to that point in time, but was surpassed by Viasa Flight 742 in 1969.

== Notable passengers ==
One of those who perished in the flight 217 crash was Olga Antonetti, who had been Miss Venezuela in 1962. Also killed was Rafael Antonio Curra, a Venezuelan ichthyologist and university professor.

== Accident cause ==
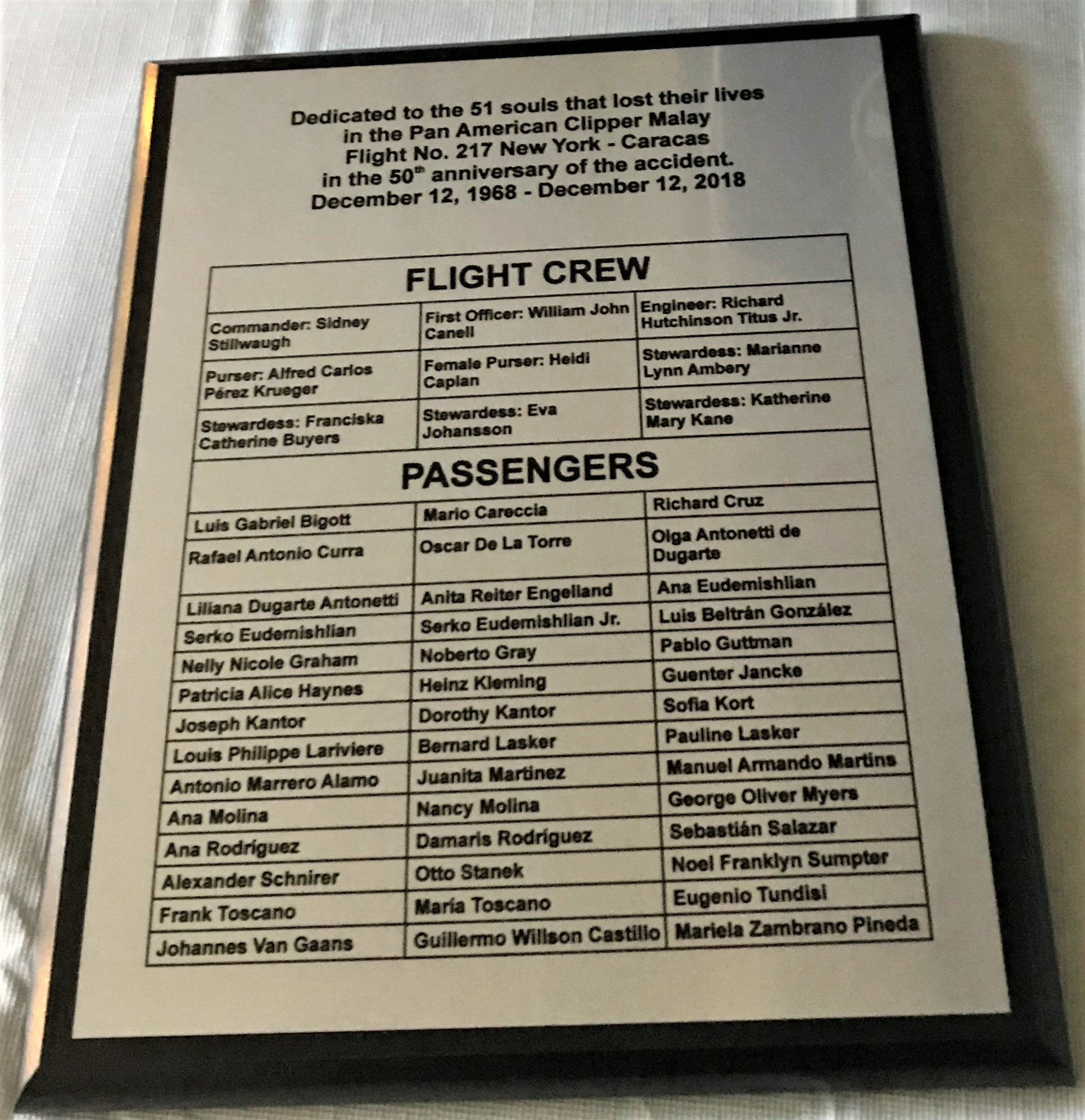
Memorial plaque, 8th Avenue, New York City

The cause of the crash was believed to be pilot error resulting from an optical illusion, created by the lights of the city of Caracas on an upslope. This may have caused the crew to descend until they crashed into the sea, with the loss of all on board. However, the National Transportation Safety Board stated the probable cause was undetermined.
