= Luis Manuel Peñalver =

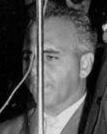
Luis Manuel Peñalver

Luis Manuel Peñalver (San Antonio de Capayacuar, Monagas, 1 February 1918 - Caracas, 28 April 2004) was a Venezuelan malariologist and politician. He was a long-time member of the Democratic Action party and was named Minister of Education of Venezuela the first presidency of Carlos Andrés Pérez (1973-1978).

== Biography ==
He received a degree in Medicine from Central University of Venezuela in 1943, and soon afterwards began working as a researcher in the area of Tropical Medicine.

After a coup d'état overthrew Isaias Medina Angarita in October 1945, he was appointed as Vice-rector of the Central University of Venezuela.

During the dictatorial regimen of Marcos Perez Jimenez (1952-1958), while in exile in Guatemala, he managed the same laboratory where Ernesto Guevara worked in 1954.

When the Universidad de Oriente was created in 1958 by executive order of Edgar Sanabria, he was appointed its first Rector. Between 1969 and 1974, he presided the National Council for Scientific and Technologycal Research. In 1974, he became a member of the cabinet of Carlos Andres Perez as Minister of Education. In the mid-1980s, he was appointed Ambassador of Venezuela to Italy.
