= Hernán Gamboa =

Venezuelan musician (1946–2016)

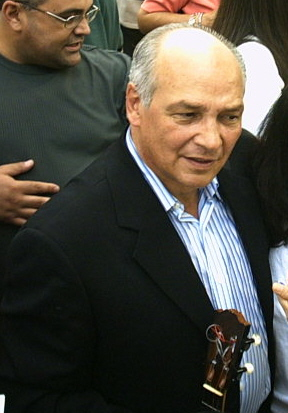

Background information
- Birth name: Hernán José Gamboa Alexis
- Also known as: El Cuatro de Venezuela
- Born: June 18, 1946; San Tomé, Anzoátegui, Venezuela
- Origin: Anzoátegui, Venezuela
- Died: January 10, 2016 (aged 69); Buenos Aires, Argentina
- Genres: Venezuelan folk music
- Occupation(s): Musician, singer, composer
- Instrument: Cuatro
- Years active: 1956–2016

Hernán Gamboa in FUNDEF, April 29, 2006

Hernan José Gamboa Alexis (June 18, 1946 – January 10, 2016) was a Venezuelan musician, composer and singer. He was a member of the Venezuelan fold music group Serenata Guayanesa, and later released separate albums.

== Biography ==
The first of seven sons between musician and composer Carmito Gamboa Almeida y Carmen Alexis de Gamboa, Gamboa grew up around music. He studied music with his father, who taught him to play the traditional Venezuelan instrument, the Cuatro, as well as the guitar and various other instruments.

In 1970, Gamboa helped found Serenata Guayanesa with his friends and colleagues Mauricio Castro Rodríguez and the brothers Iván and César Pérez Rossi. He was the cuatrista and tenor voice in the group, which from 1972 until he left the group in 1983, recorded 10 albums.

In 1977, while still a part of the Serenata Guauanesa, Gamboa launched his solo career by signing with the Venezuelan record company PROMUS. In August of that year, he released his first solo album, "El Cuatro de Venezuela." Then in 1983, he decided to focus all his attention on his solo career, and hence left the Serenata Guyanesa. He released a total of 25 solo albums in his lifetime.

Gamboa began suffering from muscular dystrophy, and in 1992 decided to move to the United States in order to get a clearer diagnosis and the help he needed. He lived in Miami for a while, before moving to Buenos Aires, Argentina in 2010, where he continued his musical career until his death.

In August 2015, Gamboa was diagnosed with lung cancer, which he would die of several months later on January 10, 2016.

== Nominations ==
He was nominated for the Latin Grammy's for three of his records: El mundo en cuatro cuerdas (1993), Serenatas en contrapuntos (2006) and La Fiesta (2007), although he never won one.
