= Diocese of Santo Tomas de Guiana =

Former diocese in Venezuela

Diocese of Saint Thomas of Guiana Dioecesis Sancti Thomae de Guiana

Location
- Country: Venezuela
- Metropolitan: Caracas
- Headquarters: Ciudad Bolívar

Information
- Established: 19 December 1791
- Cathedral: Cathedral of Ciudad Bolívar

Saint Thomas of Guiana was a Roman Catholic diocese and suffragan of Caracas.

== History ==
It was erected by Pope Pius VI on 19 December 1791, and comprised the former state of Bermúdez, districts of Nueva Esparta and Guayana, and territories of Amazonas, Colon, Colón, Orinoco and Yuruary, in the south and east of Venezuela.

The Caribs were Christianized by the early Spanish Franciscan missionaries. The episcopal city, Ciudad Bolívar, was established in 1764 by two Jesuits under the governorship of Joaquín de Mendoza, on the right bank of the Orinoco, and called San Tomás de la Nueva Guayana; but owing to a narrowing of the river was commonly known as Angostura. It played an important part in the national history, and in February 1819 Simón Bolivar was elected president there by the Congress of Colombia; in his honor the city has been renamed Ciudad Bolivar.

== Bishops ==
Colonial era

- Francisco de Ibarra, born at Guacara, Venezuela
- José Antonio Mohedano (1800), born in the Diocese of Toledo
- José de Silva y Olave (15 March 1815)

After Venezuelan independence

- Mariano Talavera, of Santa Fé, vicar Apostolic and titular Bishop of Tricala.
- Antonio Fortique (12 July 1841)
- José Emanuel Arroyo (1856)
- Antonio Maria Duran (25 Sept. 1891)
