= Serenata Guayanesa =

Venezuelan folk quartet

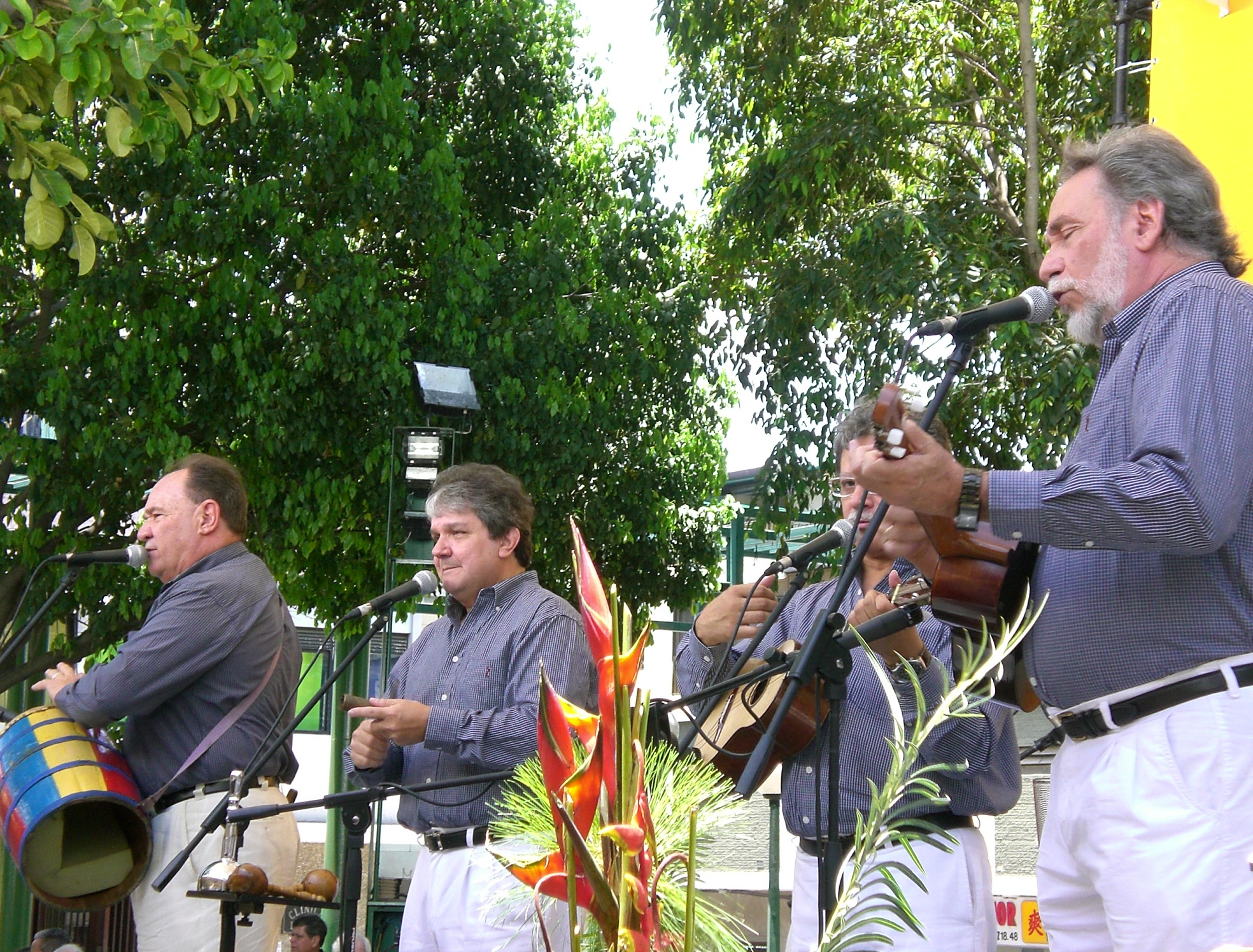
- Serenata Guayanesa performing in 2008

Background information
- Origin: Ciudad Bolívar, Bolívar state, Venezuela
- Genres: Venezuelan folk music (Calypso, Aguinaldo, Golpe Guayanés, Sangueo, Vals, Merengue Caraqueño)
- Years active: 1971–present
- Members: Iván Pérez Rossi; César Pérez Rossi; Mauricio Castro Rodríguez; Miguel Angel Bosch
- Past members: Hernán Gamboa
- Website: Official website

Serenata Guayanesa is a vocal and instrumental quartet that plays typical Venezuelan folk music. It is one of the two best known groups that play this style of music (the other being Un Solo Pueblo).

On 18 November 2016, the quartet was declared Venezuelan cultural heritage.

== See also ==
- Venezuela
- Music of Venezuela
- Iván Pérez Rossi
- Hernán Gamboa
