= Iván Pérez Rossi =

Venezuelan musician

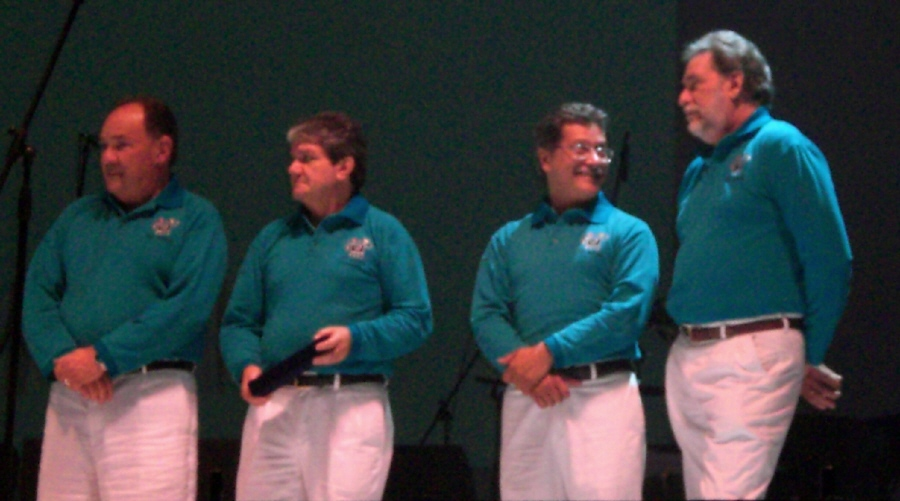
- Iván Pérez Rossi (First from right) along with Serenata Guayanesa
- Born: August 3, 1943 (age 81); Ciudad Bolívar, Venezuela

Iván Pérez Rossi is a singer and musician born in Ciudad Bolívar, Venezuela, August 3, 1943. He was a part of the musical group Serenata Guayanesa.

== See also ==
- Venezuela
- Music of Venezuela
- Serenata Guayanesa
