= Cheo Hurtado =

Venezuelan musician

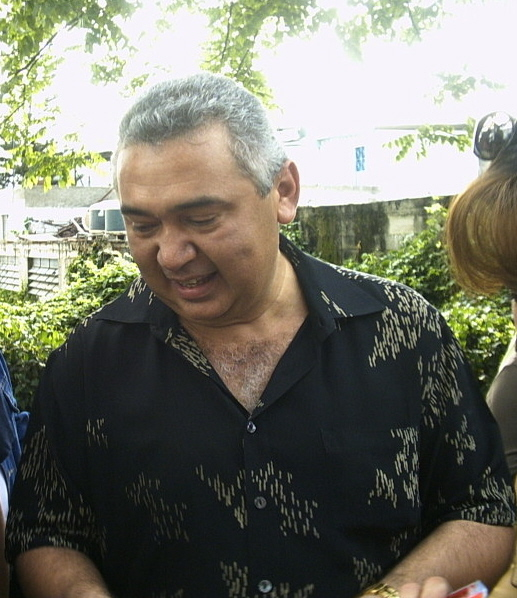

Background information
- Born: May 2, 1960 (age 64); Ciudad Bolívar, Venezuela
- Genres: Venezuelan folk music
- Occupation(s): musician, cuatro executant, composer, musical producer
- Instrument: cuatro

Cheo Hurtado (born May 2, 1960) is a Venezuelan musician, one of the most celebrated virtuoso performers of the cuatro, whose extremely agile strumming technique is currently believed to be unsurpassed. He also plays mandolin, bandola and guitar.

Cheo Hurtado was born in Ciudad Bolívar, Bolívar state, Venezuela, the son of the guitarist and composer Ramón Hurtado. He was christened Asdrúbal, but the nickname "Cheo" took hold firmly since early childhood.

Besides his native Venezuela, Hurtado has performed in Colombia, Brazil, Chile, Argentina, Ecuador, Bonaire, Aruba, Curaçao, Martinique, Dominican Republic, Mexico, Taiwan, Japan, France, Spain, England, Germany, Netherlands, and Switzerland. Between October and November 2005, Hurtado staged 21 concerts in Japan and Taiwan, showcasing the best of Venezuelan traditional music featuring the cuatro. To date, he has recorded on at least 20 albums.

== See also ==
- Venezuela
- Ensamble Gurrufio
- Venezuelan music
- Cuatro
