= Pio Lava Boccardo =

Italian-Venezuelan zootechnician and wildlife breeder (1902–1971)

Pio Lava Boccardo (also known as Pio Lava and Pio Alessandro Lava Boccardo) (Alessandria, Kingdom of Italy, 31 May 1902; Caracas, Venezuela, 16 August 1971) was an Italian-Venezuelan zootechnician and wildlife breeder.

He was director of the zoological parks of Maracaibo and Las Delicias (Maracay) and founding director of the Parque Zoológico El Pinar, the first zoological park in Caracas, in 1945.

== Life ==
He was born on May 31, 1902, in Alessandria della Paglia, Piedmont region, during the period of the Kingdom of Italy. His parents were Pietro Lava and Maria Boccardo.

As a teenager he was part of the Italian diaspora that sailed to the Americas after the First World War, promoted mainly by the economic crisis of the interwar period, the rise of Fascism in Italy with Benito Mussolini as the main leader, and the promise of great opportunities for personal growth in the New World. Upon arriving in Venezuela in 1921, he settled in Maracaibo at a time of great economic boom in the oil industry.

He contracted nuptials in Maracaibo on October 14, 1931, with Panamanian Dolores Sánchez Martín, from a distinguished family of Spanish immigrants formed by Luis Sánchez Caicedo and Elvira Martín. He procreated two daughters: María Elvira (born in Maracaibo in 1932), and Luisa Antonia (born in Maracaibo in 1935); and two sons: Antonio Pedro (born in Maracay in 1937) and Pedro Alejandro (born in Maracay in 1940).

Between 1935 and 1945 he was the director of the Maracaibo and Las Delicias (Maracay) zoos. The latter was originally built to house the personal collection of Juan Vicente Gómez in a section of the Hacienda Sabana de Paja (later called Las Delicias) in 1915.

His wife Dolores Sánchez Martín died suddenly from undetermined causes, on May 11, 1943, in Maracay.

On August 13, 1945, he participated in the inauguration of the El Pinar Zoological Park in Caracas as director of the new enclosure intended mainly for the exhibition of local wildlife specimens. The land where this new zoological garden was installed was part of the Hacienda La Vaquera, a property previously owned by Juan Vicente Gómez which had been confiscated in 1935.

On June 13, 1950, the Government of the United States of Venezuela issued the decree by which it issued a naturalization letter and granted him Venezuelan citizenship. That act determined his resignation to his Italian citizenship.

He died on August 16, 1971, at the age of 69 in the Military Hospital of Caracas as a consequence of a stroke.
