= Francisco De Venanzi =

Venezuelan academic (1917–1987)

Francisco Antonio De Venanzi
- Born: 12 March 1917; Caracas
- Died: 12 September 1987 (aged 70); Caracas
- Occupations: doctor, scientist, academic

Francisco Antonio De Venanzi (12 March 1917 – 12 September 1987) was a Venezuelan doctor, scientist and academic. He was rector of the Universidad Central de Venezuela from 1959 to 1963. His biography was published as volume 51 of the Biblioteca Biográfica Venezolana.

== Career ==
De Venanzi was born in Caracas on 12 March 1917, the son of Augusto De Venanzi and de Rosa De Novi. He qualified as a doctor at the Central University of Venezuela in 1942, and completed a master's in Biochemistry at Yale University in 1945. He became a professor in the Faculty of Medicine of the Central University of Venezuela, first in physiology, then in pathology and later in pathophysiology. Like other professors, he resigned in 1951 in protest at decree 321 of the military junta, which ended the autonomy of the university.

In 1950 De Venanzi founded the Venezuelan Association for the Advancement of Science, AsoVAC, which publishes the journal Acta Científica Venezolana. In 1951, with Marcel Roche and other scientists, he founded the Institute of Medical Research of the Luis Roche Foundation.
