= Universidad de Oriente (Venezuela) =

Public university in Venezuela

Coordinates: 10°28′19″N 64°09′16″W

University of Oriente - Venezuela
- Universidad de Oriente - Venezuela
- Type: Public - Federal
- Rector: Milena Bravo de Romero
- Students: unknown
- Location: Anzoátegui, Bolívar, Monagas. Nueva Esparta, Sucre, Venezuela
- Website: www.udo.edu.ve/

The University of Oriente (UDO), founded in 1958, is one of the main national universities in Venezuela and the main autonomous university institution dedicated to teaching, research and development in Eastern Venezuela. The main headquarters and rector's office are in Cumaná and were created as a federal, public and autonomous institution.

== History ==
The Universidad de Oriente was founded on 21 November 1958 by Decree Law No. 459 published in the Official Gazette of the Republic of Venezuela No. 25,831 by the Governing Board chaired by Edgar Sanabria, as Minister of Education on Rafael Pizani, under the leadership of its founder, Rector Luis Manuel Peñalver. It became operational on 12 February 1959, which marked the birth of the University and a year later, with 113 students and a dozen teachers, in an old mansion of Cumana Caiguire sector. On 29 March 1960, the republic's president, Rómulo Betancourt, officially opening the Universidad de Oriente, an act on the former site of the School "Pedro Arnal".

The Oceanographic Institute of Venezuela was created as a branch of the University of East by means of the Executive Order 459 of President Edgar Sanabria signed on November 21, 1958.

== Crisis ==
UDO has experienced challenges since about 2013, akin to other public institutions in the country. These challenges have raised questions about the institution's autonomy and sustainability. In the recent decade, UDO's autonomy has faced pressures, and its operational capacity has been restricted. Notably, there have been budgetary limitations, with the received funding often not meeting the university's operational requirements. As a result, there have been issues with staff remuneration, facility maintenance, and overall institutional health. Some sections of its infrastructure have also reported damage.

During this period, UDO recorded a decline in faculty and student numbers. In 2022, a portion of faculty members transitioned out of the institution, a trend observed across many institutions in Venezuela. Concurrently, there was a decrease in student enrollment, suggesting concerns about the institution's prospective trajectory. This reduction has also been reflected in the university's research contributions, which had previously held significance in the eastern region of Venezuela.

In response to these challenges, the UDO community has proposed various strategies, including exploring alternative funding mechanisms, expanding academic programs on an international scale, and fostering collaborations with other national and international institutions.
