= Third World Ideology =

1982 book by Carlos Rangel

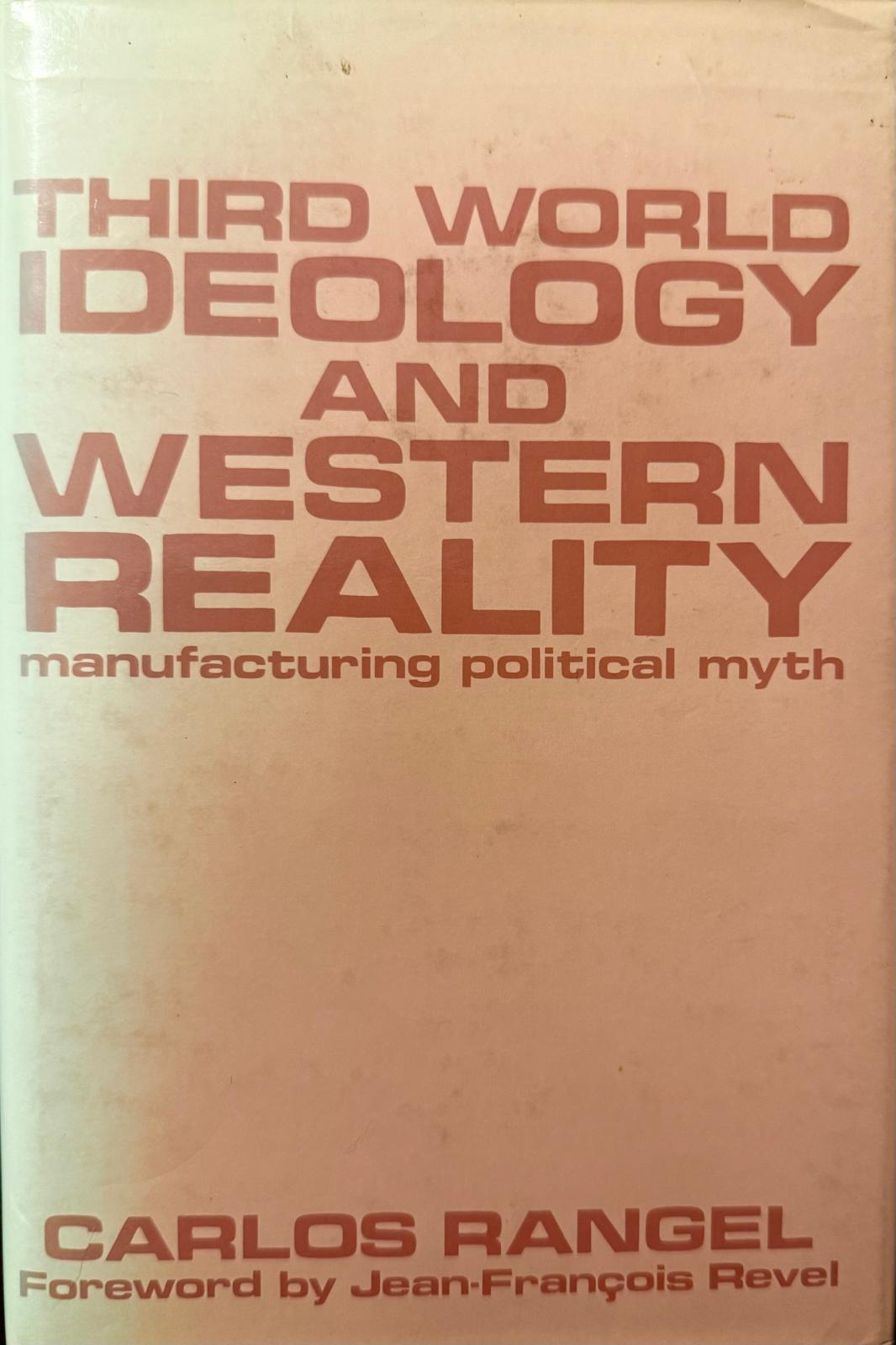
- Cover of English language first edition
- Author: Carlos Rangel
- Original title: El tercermundismo
- Translator: Carlos Rangel, with the assistance of Vladimir Tismaneanu, Ralph von Roy, and Maria Helena Contreras
- Language: Spanish
- Publication date: 1982
- Publication place: Venezuela
- English publication date: 1986
- Pages: 180
- ISBN: 0-88738-601-6
- Preceded by: The Latin Americans: Their Love-Hate Relationship with The United States
- Followed by: Marx and the Real Socialisms and Other Essays

Third World Ideology and Western Reality: Manufacturing Political Myth (Original title in Spanish: El tercermundismo) is a 1982 book by Venezuelan author and journalist Carlos Rangel, first published in Spanish by Monte Ávila Editores (Caracas) and later translated into multiple languages. The book offers a critical analysis of the ideological framework often referred to as Third-worldism.

Third World Ideology extends Rangel's critique centered on political development as essential to economic development, first presented in his book (The Latin Americans: Their Love-Hate Relationship with the United States, 1976). In this previous book he analyzed history, traditions, and cultural myths in Latin America which he considered held back the economic development of the region. In Third World Ideology, he applies this analytical framework to a global scale, focusing on a conceptual framework, which he labels "Third-Worldism", as the core reason many regions around the world remain economically stagnant. His analysis follows the transformation of the term “Third World” from a convenient postwar geopolitical concept identifying former colonies to an ideology of victimhood used by the Soviet Union as a Cold War tool. In 1976, in The Latin Americans, he first presented Third-Worldism as a conceptual proposition. This book uses that proposition and examines it through the larger lens of the Cold War clash.

Third-worldism as a concept is sometimes traced to the decolonization struggles and impacts highlighted by Marxist philosopher Frantz Fanon and his 1961 book The Wretched of the Earth. Jean Paul Sartre, and Robert J. C. Young both use Fanon’s book as referential to the trauma of the decolonization process. Sartre’s support for violent revolution (in the case of Algeria) in his introduction to Fanon’s book is also advocated in his Nobel Prize refusal letter in which he praises the Venezuelan guerrilla movement known as “The Armed Struggle,” a reference noted by Rangel in his first book, The Latin Americans. Fanon's book presents the impact of Decolonization from a Marxist perspective, but Rangel goes further back to the ideology's roots in Leninism and Stalinism and through to the Bandung Conference.

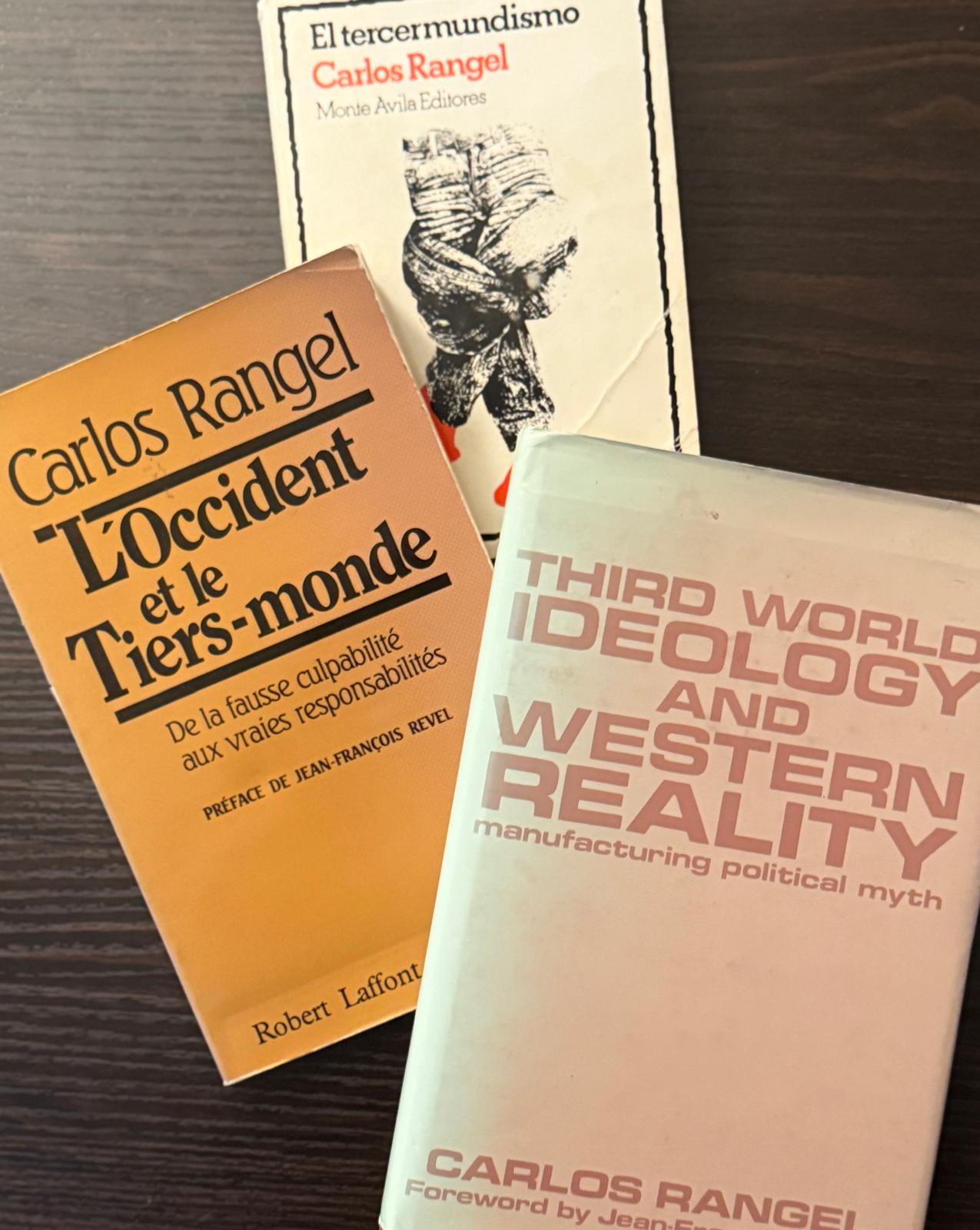
First editions of "Third World Ideology" (El tercermundismo) in Spanish, French and English, by Carlos Rangel.

In December 1982, the same month the book was published in Paris, in an editorial for Le Monde Diplomatique, (“Mausolée pour deux absents”) Claude Julien critiqued tiers-mondisme (Third-Worldism) as an ideology at once “confused and simplistic,” noting that while it mobilized moral outrage against colonialism and capitalism, it often absolved local “Third World” elites of responsibility for corruption, authoritarianism, and poor governance. Julien argued that supporting this argument fostered a sense of Western guilt, weakened liberal confidence, and relied on simplistic dualisms of “oppressors vs. oppressed,” concerns that paralleled Carlos Rangel’s own critiques of Third-World ideology. Third-Worldism as a coined term of art was a mainstream concept in the United States by 1999 by an issue from the journal Current History dedicated to The Third World.

== Key Themes ==
Rangel presents Marxism not as a scientific framework but as a modern myth, a secular religion that offers redemption stories, villains, and a millenarian vision of history. Even after what to author describes as the visible and public failures of “real socialism” in the USSR and China, Marxism persists because it satisfies enduring psychological and moral needs. He first articulated this view in his 1980 introduction to The Communist Manifesto, later expanded in his book Marx and the Real Socialisms and other Essays. Scholars such as James Petras and Leonardo Favio Osorio have noted Rangel’s rendering of Marxism as a secular religion that explains its resilience despite repeated failures of its practice in the “real” world.

Rangel situates the rise and lineage of Third-Worldism (tercermundismo). Tracing its roots from Marx and Hobson through Lenin, Stalin, Decolonization, and the Bandung Conference, Rangel argues that Third-Worldism emerged as an ideological extension of Leninist socialism, serving Soviet imperial aims. This new “-ism” blamed capitalism and colonialism for all ills while perpetuating authoritarian governance at home. By making the value of grievance a moral debt owed by the West, the ideology of Third-Worldism obscured internal institutional failures that hindered development. Reviews in academic and journalistic outlets highlighted this analysis: Edward LiPuma stressed Rangel’s tracing of Third-Worldism as an ideology, while Paul-Jean Franceschini in Le Monde described the book as a “useful blasphemy” that challenged the orthodoxies of tiers-mondisme.

Rangel further argues that Third World underdevelopment stems from institutional weakness and ideological rigidity, not capitalism or external forces. Contrasting the development and use of timepieces and timekeeping in Europe and the Far East as an example, he stresses that the capitalist revolution—not colonialism or socialism—was the true rupture, disruption, enabling prosperity. Rejecting this fact, he contends, fuels myths and misguided nationalisms, where autarky has historically led to poverty. Scott McConnell in Commentary emphasized this point in his review, highlighting Rangel’s rejection of external blame which he perceived as an obstacle to reform.

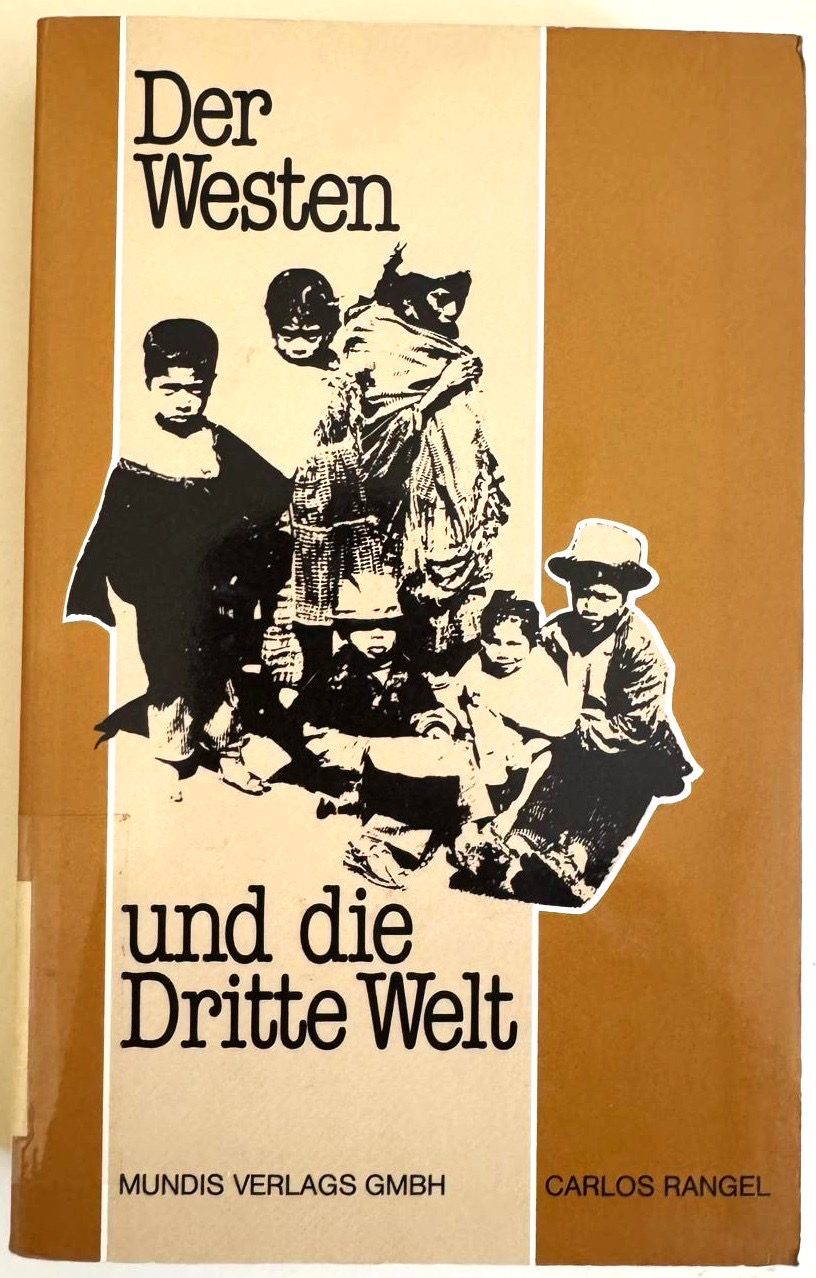
Cover of German Edition (1985)

Finally, Rangel critiques the role of Western intellectuals who he claims, misinterpreting Marx, have distorted Marx’s ideas, turning him into an anti-modern figure, contrary to his admiration for capitalist dynamism. These writers and intellectuals, that he says are driven by guilt and self-flagellation, have legitimized Third-Worldism and weakened liberal democracies. He observes that both left and right converge in their rejection of liberal capitalism when supporting the concept of Third-Worldism: the left in the name of revolutionary purity, the right in defense of tradition. Rangel uses an extensive excerpt of F. A. von Hayek’s essay “Why I am not a Conservative” to underscore this position.

While recognizing historical injustices, Rangel dismisses reparations and redistribution as substitutes for reform, insisting that progress must come from within nations themselves. He uses Japan, Israel, and South Korea as examples, albeit imperfect, of such an economic development model. For Rangel, capitalism is inseparable from liberal democracy and is best understood as a civilizational paradigm that, rooted in liberty, pluralism, and voluntary cooperation, raises living standards broadly.

== Reception and legacy ==
Upon publication, the book provoked polarized reactions: praised in liberal and conservative circles for its critique of dependency theory, but dismissed by left-leaning reviewers as polemical or pseudo-scholarly. Over time, it has been regarded as a defense of liberal democracy against Third-Worldist and anti-capitalist ideologies.

The book clashed with dominant intellectual trends in Latin America and some academic Western circles during the Cold War. Reviews in Political Science Quarterly dismissed it as “pseudo-scholarly,” suggesting Rangel’s thesis was ideologically driven. In Le Monde, Paul-Jean Franceschini offered mixed praise, calling it a “useful blasphemy” that shredded the platitudes of colonial guilt and unequal exchange, while faulting Rangel’s “willingly snarling” tone and lack of nuance regarding Western responsibility. Other reviewers, such as Edward LiPuma in the Journal of Interamerican Studies and World Affairs, questioned the causality in Rangel’s argument and criticized the style as polemical, suggesting a right-wing or reactionary agenda.

Rangel himself wrote in Commentaire Magazine presenting the principal arguments of the book: False guilt and victimhood, colonialism as insufficient explanation for the Third World’s ills, and exploitation of this Western guilt by communist ideologues. In the same issue, Jean-François Revel warned that this one-sided narrative distorted the understanding of underdevelopment and weakened liberal democracy by excusing authoritarian regimes. Revel also authored the foreword toThird World Ideology. Rangel published again in the French journal Commentaire, reiterating that Third-Worldism imposed a “false guilt” on Western democracies.

Scott McConnell’s review in Commentary praised Rangel’s moral clarity—especially his claim that socialism offers “virtue without sacrifice”—but doubted whether the book provided constructive policy advice once Third-Worldist myths were dismantled. Rangel himself rejected the notion that an analyst must propose solutions. In a 1976 television interview he explained: “I don’t believe that someone who analyzes is obliged to propose solutions; … the choice between interpreting the world and transforming it is a false dilemma: interpreting the world is a way of preparing its transformation.”

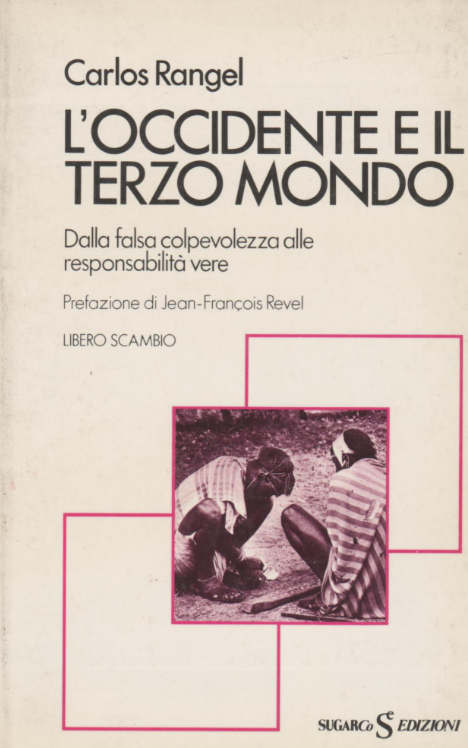
Italian Edition - Cover fist Edition (1983)

The book is generally considered a companion to Del buen salvaje al buen revolucionario (The Latin Americans: Their Love-Hate Relationship with the United States, 1976), extending Rangel’s critique beyond Latin America. Venezuelan historian Manuel Caballero, however, dismissed Rangel’s approach as polemical and reactionary, accusing him of turning “truth into dogma.”

In the decades since, the book Third World Ideology has remained influential in liberal and classical-liberal circles. The research paper by Maxime Szczepanski (L’idéologie tiers-mondiste: Constructions et usages d’une catégorie intellectuelle en «crise», 2005) examines how the concept of tiers-mondisme (Third-Worldism) was built, circulated, and later contested in French and international intellectual debates. It situates Carlos Rangel’s L’Occident et le Tiers Monde within a broader “anti-tiers-mondiste” current that gained momentum in the early 1980s, alongside works by authors such as Pascal Bruckner. Rangel is portrayed as one of the liberal critics who reframed Third-Worldism as a political myth fostering dependency and guilt, aligning him with Jean-François Revel and others in challenging the orthodoxy of decolonial romanticism. The study highlights Rangel’s impact as both a Latin American and transatlantic voice: his arguments were seen as part of the intellectual turning point when Third-Worldism entered a “crisis,” losing credibility in Europe as the Cold War advanced, and influencing later debates about development, responsibility, and postcolonial critique.

Leonardo Favio Osorio interpreted Rangel’s treatment of Marxism as portraying it less as science than as a secular religion, explaining its resilience despite repeated failures. Fernando González San Francisco, for the Spanish Liberal think tank Instituto Juan de Mariana, highlighted Rangel’s rejection of dependency theory and his defense of liberal democracy.

in 2022, Fundación Atlas in Argentina likewise celebrated the book’s ongoing relevance as a defense of individual liberty and economic freedom. Italian scholars writing in Visioni LatinoAmericane referenced the Italian edition in discussions of capitalism’s transformative role. In 2024, forty two years after its original publication, Ecuadorian economist Gabriela Calderón de Burgos, in an essay on the book, argued that Rangel had “already foreseen” the anti-growth currents of radical environmentalism, which, like earlier Third-Worldism, portrayed capitalism as a system that “produces too much.”

== Editions ==
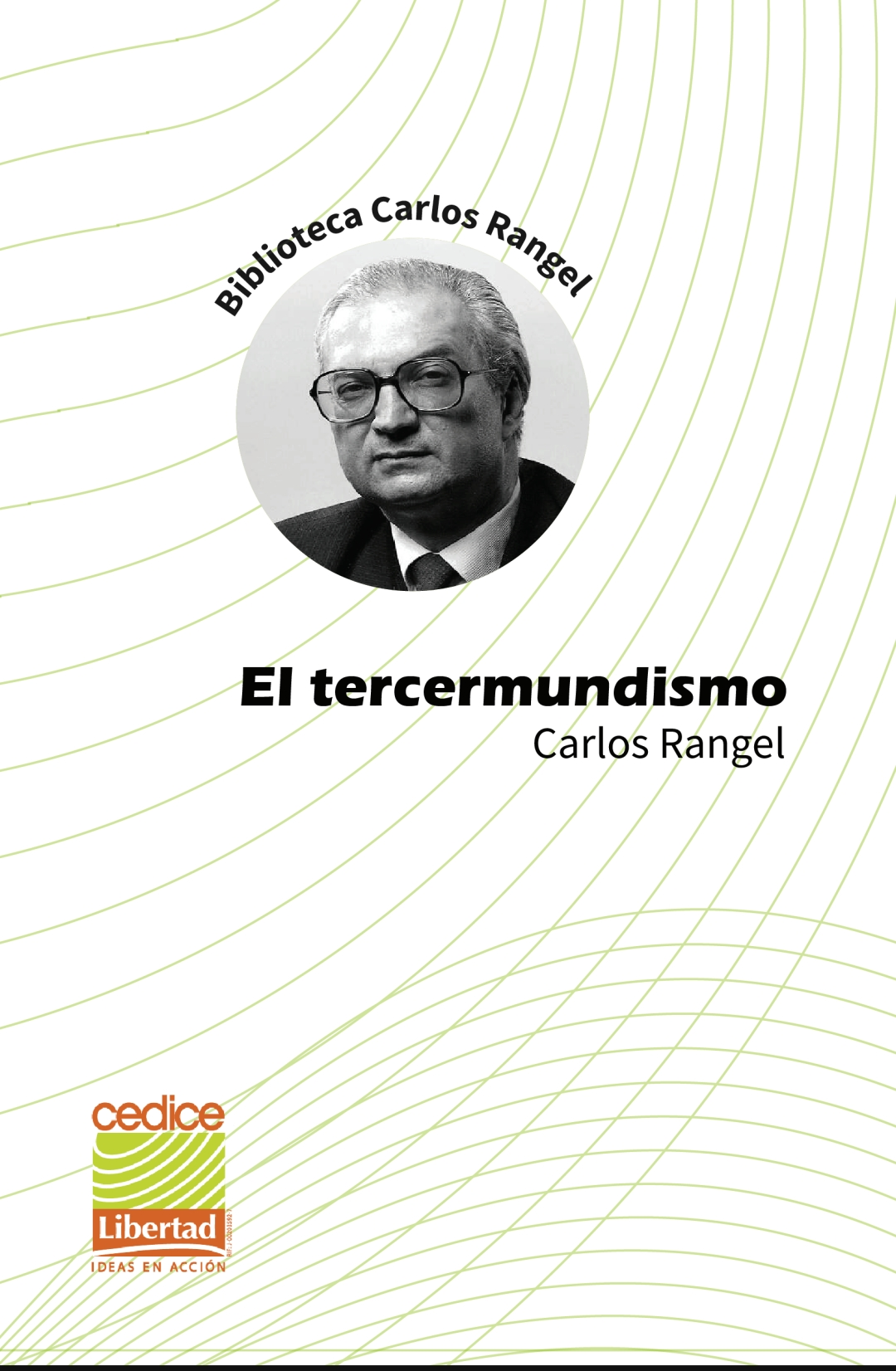
Carlos Rangel- El Tercermundismo

* 1982 – Venezuela (Spanish, Original Edition) El tercermundismo. Editorial Monte Ávila, Caracas, 1982.

- 1982 - France (French Translation) L’Occident et le Tiers Monde. Robert Laffont, Paris, 1982. ISBN 2-221-01092-2
- 1983 – Milan (Italian Translation) L’Occidente e il Terzo Mondo. SugarCo, Milan, 1983.
- 1985 – Munich (German Translation) Der Westen und die Dritte Welt: von falschen Schuldkomplexen zu echter Verantwortung. Mundis-Verlag, München, 1985. ISBN 3-89091-009-2. It is to note that this edition was Included as a reference entry in the Lexikon Dritte Welt (1989), an influential work that contributed to shaping critical development theory in the late 20th century.[10]
- 1986 - Princeton (English Translation by the author) Third World Ideology and Western Reality: Manufacturing Political Myth. Transaction Books, New Brunswick, 1986. ISBN 0-88738-601-6
- 2022 - Digital Edition (Spanish) El tercermundismo (edición digital). CEDICE Libertad, Caracas, 2022.. ISBN 978-980-434-015-4
