= Carlos Rangel =

Venezuelan writer, journalist and diplomat

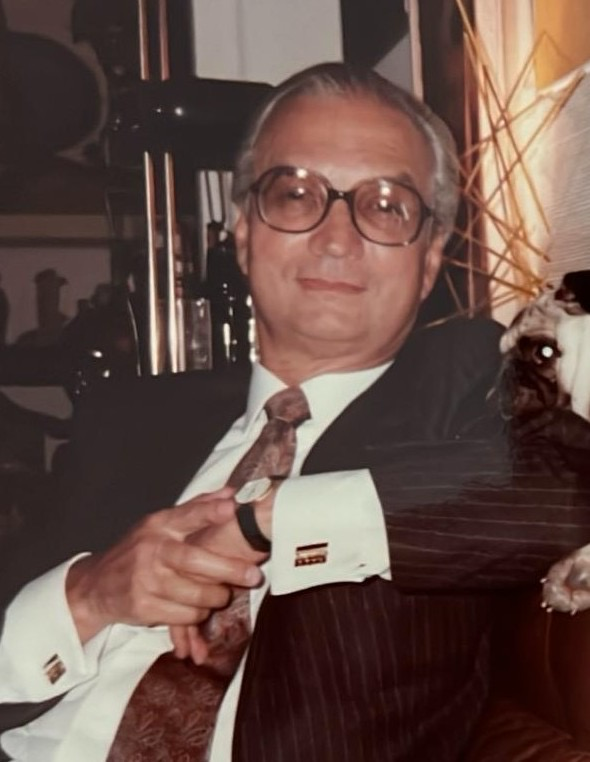
- Rangel, in about 1984
- Born: 17 September 1929; Caracas, Venezuela
- Died: 14 January 1988 (aged 58); Caracas, Venezuela
- Education: Bard College; University of Paris; New York University
- Occupations: Writer; journalist; diplomat
- Spouses: Barbara Barling (1951-1969); Sofía Ímber (1969-1988)
- Children: Four with Barbara Barling: Antonio Enrique, Magdalena Teresa, Carlos José, and Diana Cristina.

Carlos Rangel (17 September 1929 – 14 January 1988) was a Venezuelan liberal writer, journalist and diplomat.

== Background ==
Carlos Enrique Rangel Guevara was mostly known for his sharp critique of traditional Latin American political culture, of populism, and of anti-Americanism, Rangel's works sparked intense debate across ideological lines and he became a foundational figure of liberal thought in the region. His writings and speeches, as well as his television programs, helped lay the intellectual base for Latin American liberalism in the late 20th century, recognized throughout the region and beyond, from Baltimore, to Seoul, Paris, and Milan.

His influence remains significant since the publication in 1976 of his book Del buen salvaje al buen revolucionario: Mitos y realidades de América Latina (published in English as The Latin Americans: Their Love-Hate Relationship with the United States), with a foreword by Jean-François Revel, who also wrote the forewords of the first editions of Rangel's two other books, Third World Ideology, and Marx and the Real Socialisms and other Essays. His first book has become one of the most widely circulated non-fiction works in Spanish, with at least seventeen distinct editions across multiple Spanish-speaking countries. His works have been translated into French, Italian, English, Portuguese, and German. Recent editions of The Latin Americans include an updated Chilean edition (2024), a Portuguese translation in Brazil (2019), and an Italian edition (2024). The 2019 Brazilian edition includes a new biographically focused introduction by his son, Carlos J. Rangel, and which has been incorporated into subsequent editions.

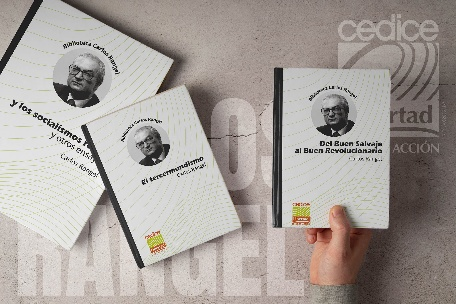
Biblioteca Carlos Rangel CEDICE Libertad (2023)

In 2023, the Venezuelan think tank CEDICE Libertad released digital editions of Rangel's three principal works. In March 2025, the Mont Pelerin Society held a roundtable discussion in Mexico City focused on Rangel's intellectual legacy.

== Early life and education ==
Carlos Rangel was born in Caracas, Venezuela, the son of José Antonio Rangel Báez, a businessman associated with Banco Caracas and Telares de Palo Grande, and Magdalena (Malala) Guevara Hermoso. He spent his early years in the then semi-rural Alta Florida neighborhood of Caracas, where he went on horseback rides through the open fields and brush of what would later become the commercial district of Sabana Grande, and the foothills of Cerro El Ávila. These early experiences fostered a lifelong connection to Venezuela's and Caracas’ landscapes.

Rangel was the grandson of Carlos Rangel Garbiras, a prominent late 19th- and early 20th-century military and political figure in Venezuela, and a direct descendant of Colonel José Antonio Rangel, a notable leader in the Venezuelan War of Independence. On his mother's side, he was the grandson of General Lorenzo Guevara Ron, a regional leader from the region of Río Chico (Barlovento, Venezuela) who earned his epaulets in the Restorative Liberal Revolution, and was named governor of Bolívar State by Cipriano Castro, a political rival of Rangel's other grandfather, Rangel Garbiras. His mother's elder half-brother was the controversial caudillo Tomás Funes, a regional strongman and governor of the Amazon territory who was executed by firing squad in 1921 by order of Juan Vicente Gómez, as part of his pacification and unification campaign of Venezuela.

Rangel received his early education in Caracas before pursuing higher studies abroad. He earned a Bachelor of Arts from Bard College in 1951, a Certificat d’Études Supérieures from the University of Paris (La Sorbonne) in Paris in 1953, and a Master of Arts from New York University in 1958. His formative years coincided with the geopolitical tensions of the Cold War. While studying in Paris, he was briefly associated with a group of Venezuelan communist exiles organizing a delegation to the 1952 Conference of the Peoples for Peace in Vienna, sponsored by the Soviet-aligned World Peace Council.

After completing his studies in France in 1953, he returned to Caracas, where the dictatorship of Marcos Pérez Jiménez had consolidated power. At that time, Rangel entered the private sector with his elder brother, José Antonio Rangel, engaging in construction projects, managing a motorcycle dealership, and buying a majority stake in the fledgling Venezuelan magazine Momento.

Together with his first wife, Barbara Barling, Rangel discreetly participated in opposition activities. Their home occasionally served as a safe house for dissidents, and they supported the resistance network connected to the Escuela de Artes Visuales Cristóbal Rojas, where Barling continued her artistic studies. By late 1955, concerned about the risks posed to his young family—then including three children under the age of three—Rangel chose to go into self-imposed exile in New York City. There, from 1955 to 1958, he pursued a master's degree in Spanish and Latin American literature at NYU, where he also served as an instructor. Fluent in English and French, he became a certified translator during this period.

The Soviet invasion of Hungary in 1956 was a pivotal moment in shaping Rangel's political outlook, reinforcing his anti-authoritarian stance and leading him to view the promises of communism as fundamentally deceptive. Nevertheless, in his first book, he also expressed concern over the domestic excesses of anti-communism on democratic institutions in the United States, particularly the influence of McCarthyism and the broader Red Scare.

In 1960, after a brief diplomatic assignment in Brussels, Rangel returned to Venezuela, where he began to consolidate his public career as a journalist, writer, and outspoken advocate for liberal democracy.

== Career ==
=== Diplomacy and political life ===
Although Carlos Rangel had a limited public service career, it played a key role in shaping his worldview. In late 1958, following the ousting of Venezuelan dictator General Marcos Pérez Jiménez by a popular uprising on January 23, Rangel entered diplomatic service through the influence of fellow exile Carlos Ramírez MacGregor. A journalist and co-owner of the newspaper Panorama with a political trajectory of his own, Ramírez MacGregor was appointed Ambassador to Belgium by the transitional government. He invited Rangel to join the Venezuelan embassy in Brussels as First Secretary and Cultural Attaché.

His diplomatic post ended with the election of Rómulo Betancourt, the first democratically elected president of Venezuela's modern democratic period. Ramírez MacGregor had earlier served under President Gen. Isaías Medina Angarita in the early 1940s and was briefly imprisoned after the 1945 coup led by Betancourt and Pérez Jiménez which replaced Medina with a civilian-military junta. Ramírez MacGregor was recalled as ambassador to Belgium in 1960 and continued his political career afterwards mostly in political opposition towards Betancourt.

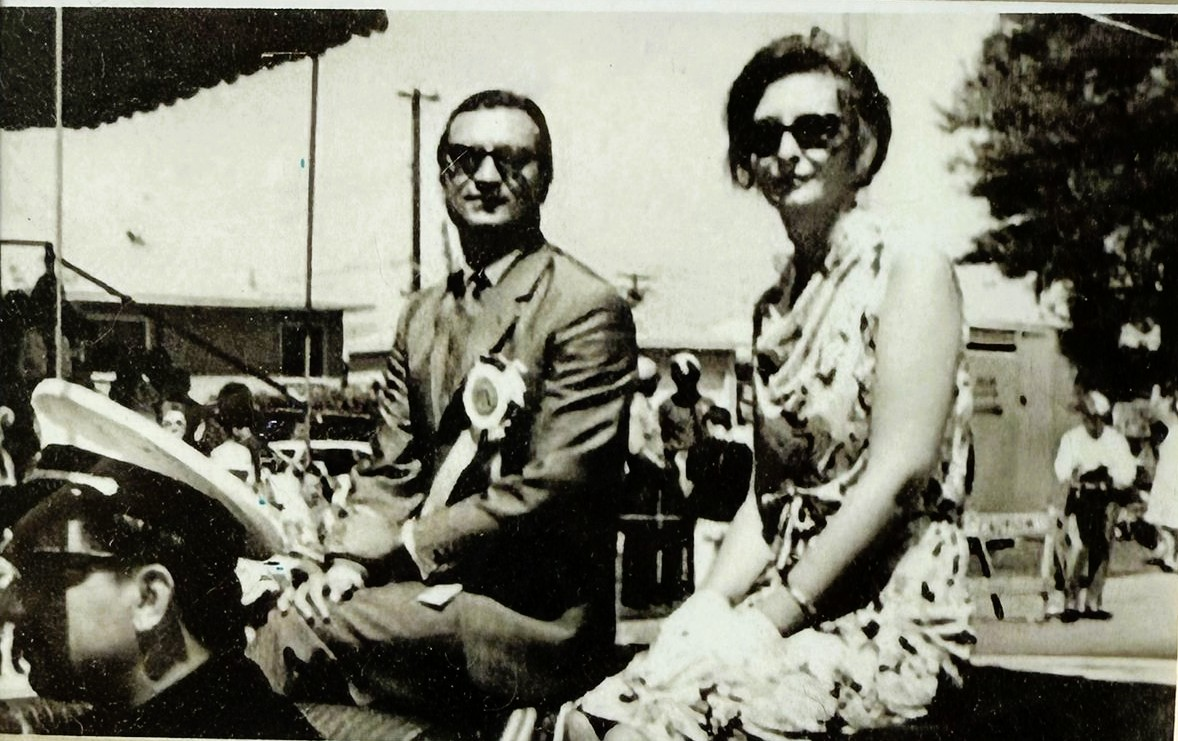
Carlos Rangel, President of the Caracas City Council, on official visit to Los Angeles with his wife, Barbara Barling

Following years of involvement in political, intellectual, and dissident circles in Paris, Caracas, and New York, Carlos Rangel became actively engaged in Venezuela's democratic transition. Having distanced himself from communist ideology, he aligned himself with the country's social democratic movement, which in Venezuela was represented best by the Acción Democrática party, the party led by Rómulo Betancourt, although he was never a party member. In 1963, Rangel ran successfully for a seat on the Caracas City Council, serving from 1964 to 1968. During his term, he was appointed President of the council, a position that at the time was effectively equivalent to that of Mayor of Caracas. His son, Carlos J. Rangel, describes this period:

"In his role as councilman, he saw up close the work of the politician and the negative effects of populism on government management. He walked neighborhoods, distributed food, inaugurated public works, discussed budgets, and drafted edicts. He was appointed as president of the Municipal Council of Caracas, and, as a result he received more needy supplicants of all kinds. Years later, in a conversation while accompanied by his second wife, Sofía Ímber, Rangel commented to me that the worst part of public political life for him was having to receive people who came to ask, ask, and ask. He told me this partly out of frustration at not being able to meet the justified needs of the citizen, partly out of frustration at having to listen to the privileged elites who feel entitled to the national treasure, and partly out of his frustration with the development of political clientelism that has trained everyone to submit to the paternalism of the state: "It is depressing to see the line of people at the door of a minister's house, waiting from the early hours of the morning, to try to give him a little piece of paper in hand, with their request, when he comes out in the morning.

In 1971–72, Carlos Rangel and his wife, Sofía Ímber, held honorary diplomatic positions at the Venezuelan Embassy in London. Rangel served as Counselor for Cultural Affairs, while Ímber was Cultural Advisor to the Centro Simón Bolívar, tasked with identifying and acquiring artworks for what would later become the Museo de Arte Contemporáneo de Caracas.

=== Public engagements and cultural involvement ===
As a well-regarded and respected public figure in Venezuela, presidents often invited Carlos Rangel to participate in executive roles within successive administrations. He consistently declined these offers, preferring to remain independent, though he occasionally accepted ceremonial roles, representing the country in international delegations. In 1976, he served as Venezuela's delegation head to the Dominican Republic at the inauguration of President Joaquín Balaguer.

He also contributed to the country's cultural institutions, serving on the board of the Fundación Teatro Teresa Carreño, Venezuela's premier performing arts center, and on the board of the Museo de Arte Contemporáneo de Caracas Sofía Ímber, one of Latin America's leading modern art museums at the time.

In the early 1980s, Rangel joined a group of intellectuals and entrepreneurs to establish a think tank devoted to classical liberal principles and economic freedom. Their efforts led to the founding of CEDICE Libertad (Centro de Divulgación del Conocimiento Económico) in 1984. The organization's stated mission was to promote the study, dissemination, and defense of individual liberty, private property, limited government, and the free market. Today, CEDICE Libertad is recognized as one of Latin America's leading libertarian think tanks.

=== Journalism and media ===
Upon his return from Belgium in 1960, Carlos Rangel and his brother José Antonio Rangel—then co-owners of the Venezuelan weekly magazine Momento with Carlos Ramírez MacGregor—named José Antonio Rangel as president, Ramírez MacGregor as its Director, and Carlos Rangel as Sub-director. During this time, Ramírez MacGregor also directed and owned the Maracaibo-based daily newspaper Panorama, making Carlos Rangel the effective managing editor of Momento.

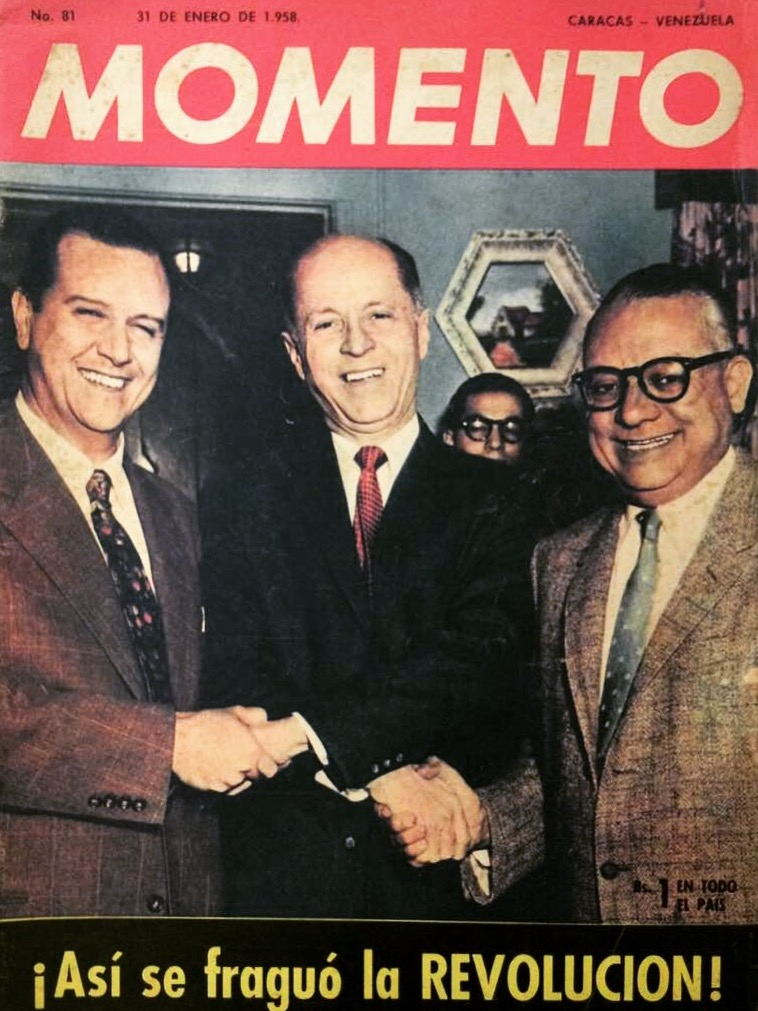
31 January 1958 cover of Momento magazine

Rangel oversaw Momento from 1960 to 1968–69, modeling it after a hybrid of Life Magazine and Newsweek. The publication provided in-depth coverage of key political and military events during the early years of Venezuela's modern democracy, including the El Porteñazo and El Carupanazo military uprisings during the Lucha Armada period. Under the Rangel brothers' leadership, Momento became a launching platform for numerous influential journalists and writers. Notable contributors included Gabriel García Márquez, Plinio Apuleyo Mendoza, and future Venezuelan president Luis Herrera Campins.

The magazine frequently featured personal and cultural content. Rangel's family appeared in several issues, such as a 1963 anniversary edition cover featuring his daughter Diana's first birthday or a photo essay of his children in the newly inaugurated Parque del Este. His then-wife, Barbara Barling, contributed a sentimental advice column, while journalist and art critic Sofía Ímber—who would later become Rangel's second wife—wrote a column titled "Yo, la intransigente", focusing on art, culture, and political commentary.

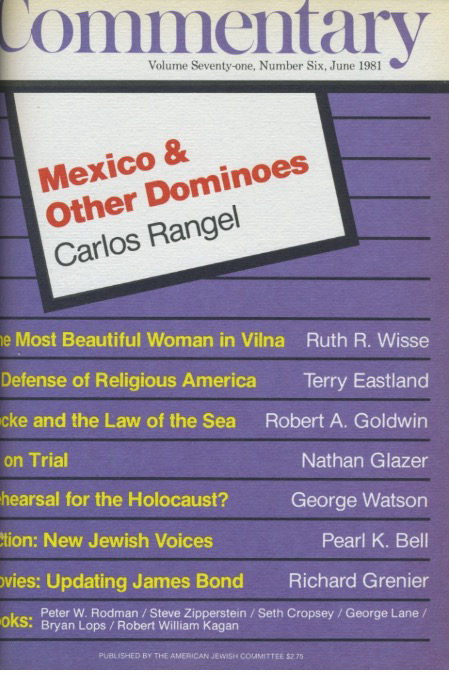
Issue of Commentary magazine highlighting article by Carlos Rangel

After stepping down from Momento in 1968, Carlos Rangel continued to write essays and conduct interviews for prominent newspapers and magazines in Venezuela and internationally. His work appeared in outlets such as El Universal (Caracas), where he contributed frequently to the "Páginas Culturales" which his wife Sofía directed, El Tiempo (Colombia), and The Wall Street Journal (New York). In Venezuela, his articles were also published in El Nacional (Venezuela), La Verdad, and 2001. Internationally, he contributed to Newsweek International, Visión (Colombia), Vuelta (Mexico – edited by Octavio Paz), Commentary (New York), Commentaire (Paris), Worldpaper (a 27-nation syndicated newspaper based in Boston and directed by Crocker Snow, Jr.), Politique Internationale (Paris), O Estado de São Paulo (Brazil), and the Spanish publications Cambio 16 and Firmas, among others.

In 1977, Rangel co-founded the Caracas-based news magazine Auténtico with his second wife, journalist and art critic Sofía Ímber. The magazine focused on current affairs and opinion with an emphasis on liberal economic perspectives. At the time Imber was asked, "Why the name?" to which she answered "Because we don't talk B.S."

=== Television ===
From the early 1960s, Carlos Rangel became a prominent voice on Venezuelan television, using it as a platform for public discussion. Beginning in 1962, he moderated Frente a la Prensa, a round-table program that brought together journalists and public figures to debate national and international affairs. His rigorous journalistic standards and willingness to challenge both official narratives and popular opinion earned him a reputation as a thought-provoking moderator. Before fully devoting himself to television, Rangel was appointed Chair of Opinion Journalism at the Universidad Central de Venezuela (UCV), serving in this academic role from 1961 to 1963.

He participated in numerous televised news specials throughout his career. In 1988, he was selected to moderate that year's Venezuelan presidential debate, although his sudden death prevented him from fulfilling the role.

==== Buenos Días ====
On 22 April 1968, Carlos Rangel and Sofía Ímber launched Buenos Días, a pioneering live morning television program that aired until 1988. Initially funded by Reinaldo Herrera and produced by Daniel Farías, the show was a risky entrepreneurial venture, purchasing time in the then unused early morning airwave slot of 7:00–8:30 AM, allowing the show to have editorial and creative independence. Commercial sponsorship was informal at first—Rangel himself made the commercial break pitches from his desk or with studio props—before the program developed fully produced commercials. Its inaugural guest was the esteemed Venezuelan writer Arturo Uslar Pietri, who remained a recurring guest every anniversary thereafter.

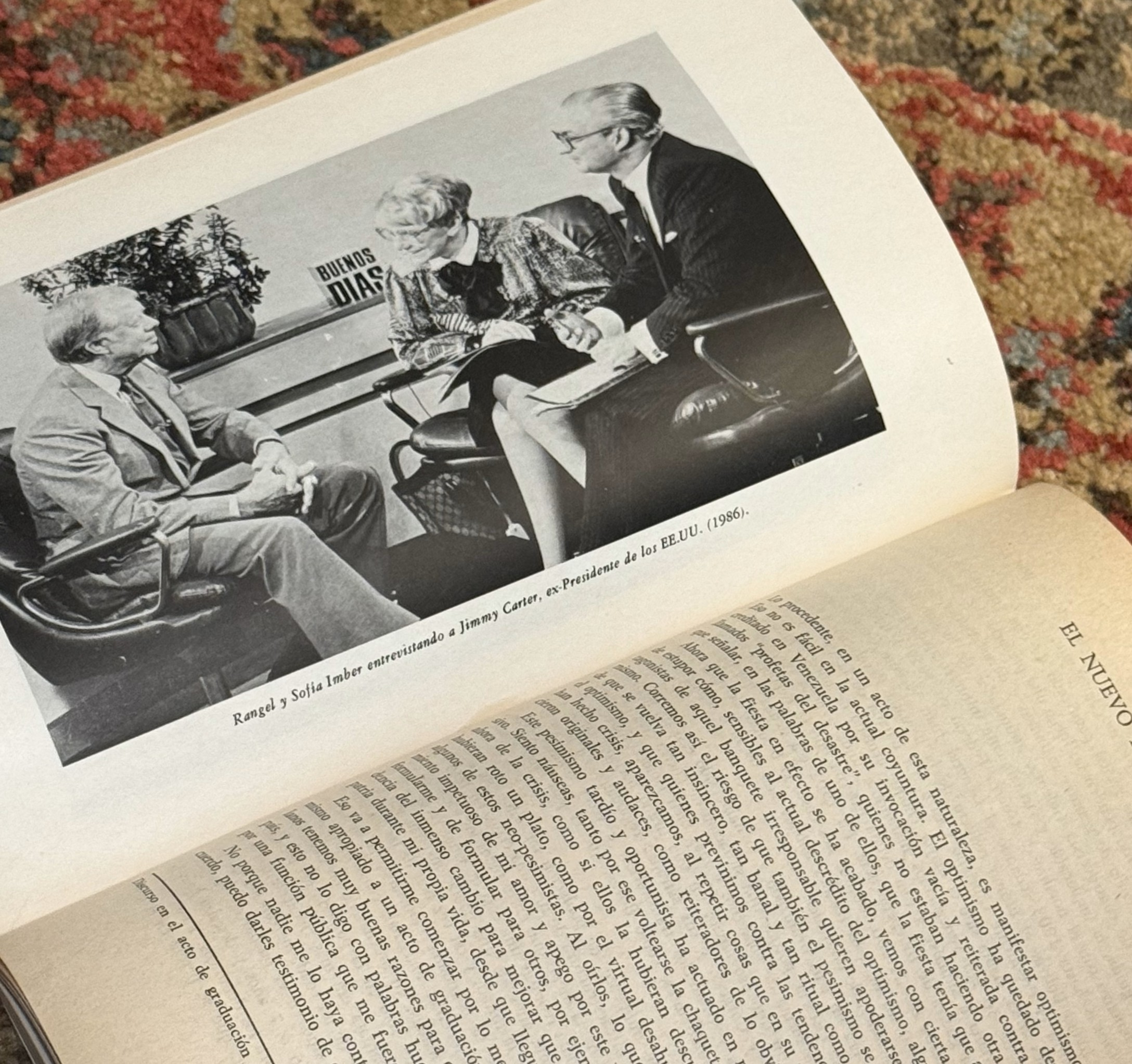
Inner illustration in Carlos Rangel's book Marx y los socialismos reales y otros ensayos (first edition) with a photo of Sofia and Carlos on the set of the show

Over twenty years, the program featured international figures such as Shimon Peres, Jimmy Carter, Felipe González, Henry Moore, Jorge Luis Borges, and Mario Vargas Llosa. Transcripts of these interviews and others are publicly available in the Centro de Investigación de la Comunicación/Sofía Imber y Carlos Rangel at the Universidad Católica Andrés Bello (UCAB). Selected clips are also available on Sofía Imber's YouTube channel. The show's impact extended beyond entertainment, making complex political debates accessible to a broad audience and setting a standard for open, idea-driven programming in Venezuelan media.

In pursuit of democratic pluralism, Rangel insisted on inviting guests from across the political spectrum, making the program a rare space for genuine dialogue in a polarized media environment. To preserve its editorial independence, the program periodically moved across networks—including Venevisión, RCTV, and VTV—as tensions with media owners arose. In one of these iterations, it aired at midday, so the name was changed temporarily to Lo de Hoy. When it changed to a different station it returned to its morning slot with its original name.

In its early iterations, Buenos Días also featured a musical segment that helped launch the careers of emerging Venezuelan artists. Among them was Soledad Bravo, who made one of her first public appearances on the program before going on to international acclaim.

== Books ==
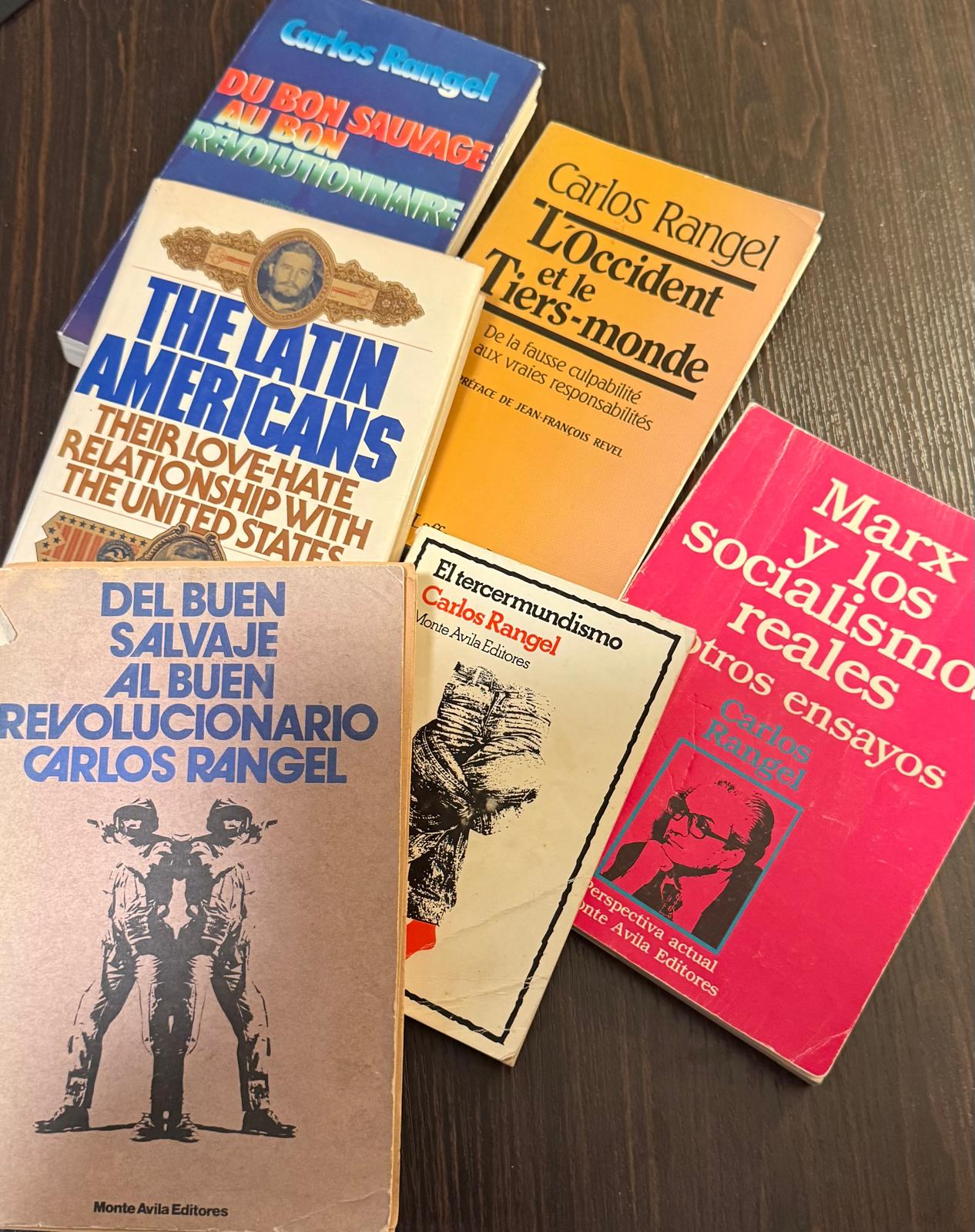
First editions of Carlos Rangel's three major books (Spanish, French, and English editions).

Carlos Rangel was a prolific author whose three major works—Del Buen salvaje al buen revolucionario (1976), El tercermundismo (1982), and Marx y los socialismos reales y otros ensayos (1988)—form an informal trilogy of liberal critique against the ideological foundations of authoritarianism and underdevelopment in Latin America and, by extension, the rest of the world. These books, widely circulated and translated, helped establish Rangel as one of the region's most influential liberal voices of the 20th century. He is a contributing author to Octavio Paz's Frustraciones de un destino: La democracia en América Latina (1985), a book focused on Mexican democracy during the times of PRI's (the Institutional Revolutionary Party) dominance.

Rangel's work often centered on exposing falsehoods, ideological myth-making, and the political evasion of truth, a core theme he articulated in a March 1976 interview. In this interview, on the occasion of the publication of his first book in Paris, he read an epigraph directly from the book, quoting Octavio Paz's The Labyrinth of Solitude: "Lying became almost constitutional in our countries. The moral damage has been incalculable and reached deep into our being; we move easily within falsehood. Therefore, the fight against official and constitutional lying must be at the root of any serious reform in Latin America." His two subsequent books elaborate on this core theme of truth: the second at a global scale, while the third one at a personal level.

All three books were edited and are available in Spanish digital format by CEDICE Libertad in 2022.

=== The Latin Americans ===
The Latin Americans: Their Love-Hate Relationship with the United States (originally published in Spanish as Del buen salvaje al buen revolucionario: Mitos y realidades de América Latina) was first released in Paris and Caracas in 1976, and subsequently in New York in 1977. The book is Rangel's polemical manifesto against the myths of the "noble savage," anti-American grievance, and ideological millenarism—particularly Marxist utopianism. He associates these narratives with Latin America's Hispanic and Roman Catholic heritage.

Structured as eleven thematic essays and a postscript, the book argues that Latin America's chronic underdevelopment stems primarily from internal cultural narratives rather than from foreign oppression. Rangel advocates for liberal democracy, the rule of law, and individual responsibility as a path to prosperity. The book provoked intense public debate. It was publicly burned at the Central University of Venezuela shortly after publication. Despite this controversy, it has remained a touchstone for classical-liberal critiques of Latin American populism.

Del buen salvaje al buen revolucionario was later translated into:

- French: Du bon sauvage au bon révolutionnaire, Éditions Jean-Claude Lattès, 1976.
- English: The Latin Americans, Harcourt Brace Jovanocich, 1977, ISBN 0-15-148795-2
- Portuguese: Do bom selvagem ao bom revolucionário, Editora Expressão e Cultura, 1980.
- Italian: Dal buon selvaggio al buon rivoluzionario, Rizzoli, 1981.

For chapter summaries, key quotes, and critical reception, see the article: The Latin Americans (book).

=== Third World Ideology ===
Third World Ideology and Western Reality (original Spanish title: El tercermundismo) was published in Caracas in 1982 by Monte Ávila Editores, and later translated into several languages. This work uses the arguments of Rangel's first book, expanding them to critique global narratives surrounding the so-called Third World.

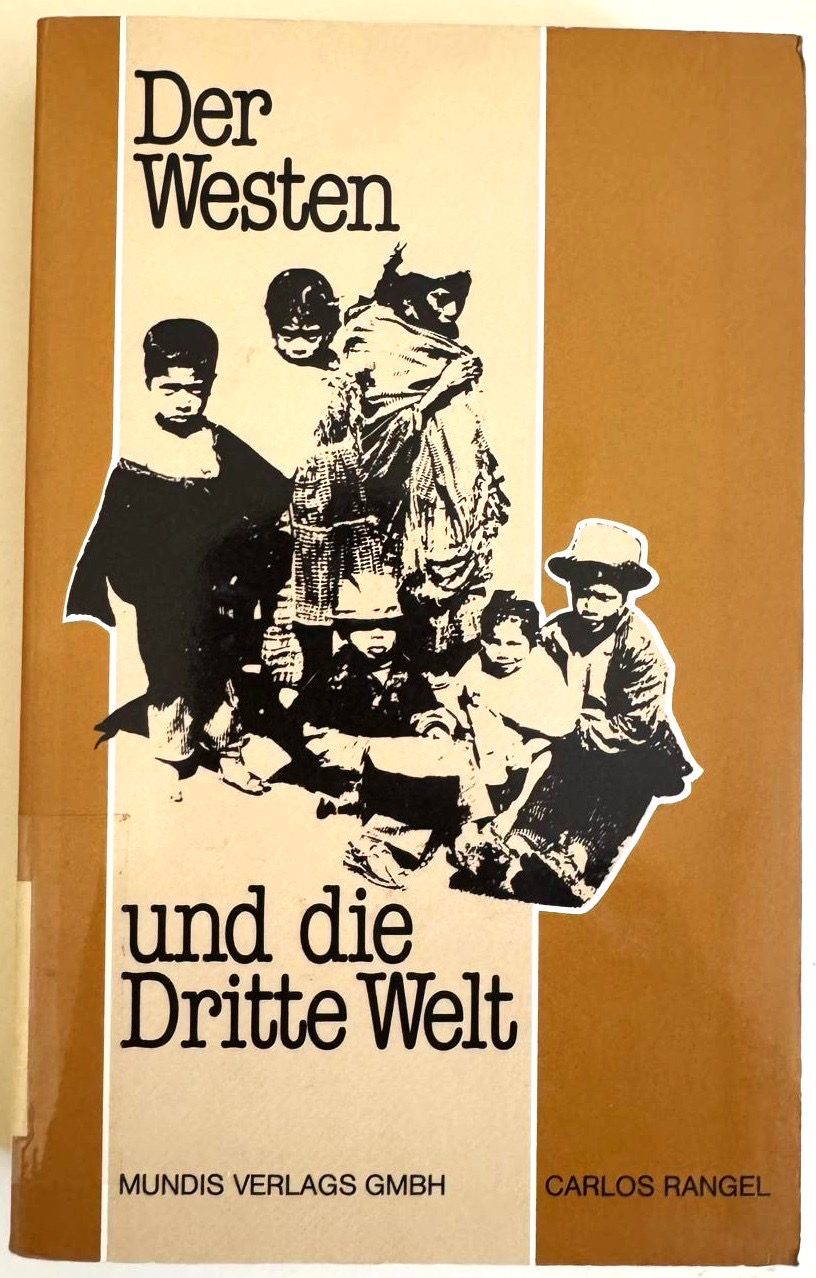
Cover of German Edition (1985)

Rangel examines how the label "Third World" transformed from a neutral postwar geopolitical designation into a powerful ideological identity defined by victimhood, grievance, and anti-Western resentment—often encouraged during the Cold War by the Soviet Union. Such usage still affects the geopolitical world of today. Rangel contends that this ideological posture obscures the real internal causes of underdevelopment, such as institutional weakness, rent-seeking, and populism, and deflects responsibility from local elites empowering authoritarian aspirations.

The book comprises nine chapters and an appendix, blending political theory and historical case studies. In the appendix, Rangel includes an interview with Austrian economist Friedrich von Hayek, in which Hayek underscores the philosophical inconsistencies of collectivist ideologies.

The work argues that liberal democracy and market institutions—not revolutionary nationalism—drive development. Rangel's thesis drew sharp criticism from Latin American leftists and dependency theorists, but it found resonance among advocates of classical liberalism. The book is considered the second volume in Rangel's informal trilogy on Latin American political culture.

El tercermundismo was translated into:

- French: L’Occident et le Tiers Monde, Robert Laffont, 1982, ISBN 2-221-01092-2
- Italian: L’Occidente e il Terzo Mondo, SugarCo, 1983
- German: Der Westen und die Dritte Welt: von falschen Schuldkomplexen zu echter Verantwortung, Mundis Verlag, 1985, ISBN 978-3-89091-009-3
- English: Third World Ideology and Western Reality, Transaction Books, 1986, ISBN 0-88738-601-6

=== Marx and the Real Socialisms and other Essays (Marx y los socialismos reales y otros ensayos) ===
Marx y los socialismos reales y otros ensayos was published posthumously in 1988 by Monte Ávila Editores in Caracas. The volume gathers thirty-two essays, lectures, and columns written by Carlos Rangel between 1975 and 1984. These writings reflect the culmination of his intellectual engagement with Marxism, authoritarianism, and liberal thought.

The essays are grouped into six thematic clusters. They include a dismantling of Marxism as a secular religion, profiles of Cuban dissidents, critiques of Venezuelan rent-based populism, and reflections on the moral and personal challenge of artists and writers facing ideological conundrums. Among the figures Rangel discusses are Jean-Paul Sartre, Albert Camus, Thomas Mann, Miguel de Unamuno, Octavio Paz, and Venezuelan painter Armando Reverón.

The book is often seen as Rangel's intellectual testament and the closing volume in an informal trilogy that began with Del buen salvaje al buen revolucionario and continued with El tercermundismo. Central to this final collection is Rangel's defense of truth, liberal democracy, and individual freedom against the pressures of collectivist ideology and political opportunism.

== Legacy and influence ==
Carlos Rangel's work offered a sharp counterpoint to the dominant currents of 20th-century Latin American political thought—particularly dependency theory, revolutionary romanticism, and Marxist ideology. Through his trilogy — Del buen salvaje al buen revolucionario (1976), El tercermundismo (1982), and Marx y los socialismos reales y otros ensayos (1988) — he mounted a systematic defense of liberal democracy, individual responsibility, and open markets. His polemics sparked fierce opposition at home, yet his post-Cold War reception has grown steadily, especially in classical-liberal and anti-populist circles.

=== Intellectual context and the "truth imperative" ===
Contemporaries such as Jean-François Revel and Manuel Caballero, as well as Sofía Ímber, emphasized Rangel's pursuit of truth and, particularly, unmasking lies and deception—a quality Rangel himself underscored by opening Del buen salvaje al buen revolucionario with an epigraph from Octavio Paz on truth, later echoed in Revel's preface to his posthumous essays and in Caballero's description of his “obsession with truth.” The latter, however, as critique, in which he accused Rangel of using “truth as rhetorical dogma,” to persuade the public as to views which Caballero considered reactionary right wing talking points.

Rangel's view on the need to find and tell the truth is a continuous theme in his public and TV appearances, in which he championed truth and freedom of expression as essential to each other. An illustrative quote on this theme is from an editorial comment in his TV show from 4 November 1976:

“At the beginning, Sofia referred to Sartre [in reference to an article appeared in this week's L'Express] and a phrase he said—among many he's said—which are very true, and that is that the intellectual's duty is to tell the truth. I just want to add that there is often an attempt to devalue and disqualify the demand for freedom of expression, saying that poets, intellectuals, and writers have no more rights than other members of society, that they have no more rights than, for example, a manual worker. And I would say that, indeed, an intellectual has no additional rights, nor does anyone who has had the privilege of acquiring an education greater than the average. They have no additional rights; what they have is a special position, because those who have had the privilege of being better informed and are able to reflect on that information have the duty to convey what they think to others. That is a duty that people who have not had this privilege do not have. So, the argument that intellectuals have no special rights to justify demanding freedom of expression is fallacious. When an intellectual demands freedom of expression and defends it for themselves and others, what they are demanding is to be allowed to fulfill their duty.”

Rangel will further explore what he called this duty and responsibilities of the intellectuals and the truth in his 1988 book Marx and the Real Socialisms and other Essays. Published posthumously, this book is widely seen as Rangel's intellectual testament—an appeal for the primacy of empirical truth and moral independence over ideological conformity. In the introduction, Jean-François Revel praised Rangel for his "rare quality among vanguard intellectuals: an interest in truth," highlighting his ethical maxim: "no escribir nunca nada más que lo que se cree verdadero" ("never write anything but what you believe to be true"). Revel describes Rangel as warning that intellectuals who abandon truth in favor of ideological fashion become "ideological opportunists, more harmful than political opportunists."

The magazine Rangel cofounded in 1977 with his wife, Sofia Imber, was called Auténtico ("Authentic"), and its motto was “The exact value of the facts” (“el exacto valor de los hechos”).

=== Critical reception ===
- Jean-François Revel (1976 preface) called Del buen salvaje "the first contemporary essay on Latin-American civilisation to sweep away false descriptions and complacent excuses," describing it as "indispensable."
- Loris Zanatta (2023 preface) dubbed Rangel "the true counter-hegemonic voice of Latin America," noting that defending liberal democracy in the 1970s was "like uttering blasphemy in church."
- Carlos Alberto Montaner (2006) highlighted Rangel's courage in assigning responsibility to Latin Americans themselves and "defending democracy and the market while condemning totalitarian barbarism of both left and right."

These endorsements help showcase Rangel's standing after years of marginalization, positioning him alongside Octavio Paz and Mario Vargas Llosa as part of a Pan-American liberal tradition.

=== Journalism and media ===
Beyond his books, Rangel had a sustained presence in Venezuelan media. He edited the weekly Momento (1960–1970) and co-hosted the daily TV program Buenos Días (1968–1988) with Sofía Ímber. Both platforms offered rare spaces for pluralist dialogue during an era of ideological polarization, reflecting Rangel's belief that journalism should confront myth with fact—a core message of Marx y los socialismos reales.

=== Posthumous revival and continuing influence ===
Rangel's death by suicide in January 1988 briefly muted his influence, even as obituaries like that in the Los Angeles Times hailed him as "one of Latin America's best-known conservative intellectuals." In the following decades, liberal think tanks such as CEDICE Libertad republished his works and commissioned memorial tributes crediting him with foresight on populism and institutional decline.

Today, Rangel's analyses are cited by scholars of populism, economists focused on institutional reform, and Venezuelan opposition figures who view Del buen salvaje as a prescient warning. Zanatta has remarked that "the good revolutionary never dies," while Montaner laments that Venezuela failed to heed Rangel's "severe warning against collectivist adventurism."

In 2013, an art exhibit in Madrid, Spain. gathered a collection of visual and conceptual art by artists from Brazil, Chile, Colombia, Sweden, and Venezuela inspired by Rangel's book, The Latin Americans: Their Love-Hate Relationship with The United States (Del buen salvaje al buen revolucionario: Mitos y realidades de América Latina)

== Criticism and controversy ==
=== Ideological backlash ===
Del buen salvaje al buen revolucionario (1976) was denounced by student and faculty groups at the Central University of Venezuela; copies were publicly burned on campus the year of publication. Detractors said Rangel's thesis—namely, that Latin America's failures stem largely from domestic governance and "myths of victimhood"—constituted an apology for U.S. imperialism and a repudiation of anti-colonial struggle. According to anecdotal accounts circulating in Venezuelan intellectual circles, José Vicente Rangel—a leading leftist politician and ideological adversary—once remarked that if he could send one person to the firing squad, it would be Carlos Rangel.

Using Revel's characterization of Rangel as a sincere intellectual in constant pursuit of truth and the unmasking of myths, in "Para una radiografía del pensamiento reaccionario" (1988), Manuel Caballero argues that Rangel's work simplifies complex realities and uses "truth" as a rhetorical weapon. Caballero posits in his essay that truth cannot be devoid of context, ideology and historical perspective, as otherwise it becomes a use of the rhetoric of certainty transformed into dogma. According to Caballero, Rangel's use of truth as dogma leads to a world view akin to Stalinism. While Del buen salvaje al buen revolucionario was dismissed by Caballero in 1988 as a "reactionary pamphlet," his later writings—such as "En la oposición, como siempre" (1998)—and his trajectory opposing Hugo Chávez reflect a shift closer to Rangel's liberal-democratic critique of ideological falsehoods.

Rangel's views are often counterposed to those of Eduardo Galeano, whose The Open Veins of Latin America argued that foreign exploitation was the principal source of the region's underdevelopment. Toward the end of his life, however, Galeano distanced himself from his own book, admitting that it was written before his intellectual development had matured—an admission some saw as tacit recognition of critics like Rangel. During the II Bienal do Livro e da Leitura in Brasília in April 2014, Eduardo Galeano stated in a press conference: "I wouldn't be able to read the book again. I'd keel over. For me, that traditional leftist prose is extremely tedious. My body couldn't take it. I'd end up in the hospital... It tried to be a work of political economy, but I lacked the necessary training."

A 2023 review in Letras Libres noted that Rangel's thesis has aged more convincingly than Galeano's, stating that "Rangel understood something that Galeano did not: myths are not ideas, but identity-producing fictions."

=== Accusations of elitism and simplification ===
Several academic reviewers argued that Rangel downplayed poverty and structural inequality by stressing individual responsibility. A capsule review in the Hispanic American Historical Review judged the book "stronger on assertion than evidence," citing a tendency to generalize complex socioeconomic patterns. Similar concerns were raised in a 1984 symposium on dependency theory, where commentators called Rangel's liberal critique "overly dismissive" of colonial legacies.

=== Media profile and partisanship ===
As editor of Momento and co-host of Buenos Días, Rangel sought to mainstream liberal ideas in Venezuela. Critics, however, contended that his broadcasts blurred reportage and advocacy, reinforcing perceptions that he was aligned with Western Cold War interests.

=== Responsibility of intellectuals ===
In his posthumous collection Marx y los socialismos reales, Rangel insisted that writers must "never write anything they do not believe to be true." Revel's prologue praised this stance, but opponents viewed it as moral absolutism that left little room for alternative perspectives.

=== Posthumous hostility ===
In a 2012 opinion piece on Aporrea, left-wing writer José Sant Roz called Rangel "un estremecedor lacayo" (a grotesque lackey) of the Venezuelan oligarchy. The article dismissed Rangel's liberalism as elitist propaganda and speculated that his suicide was due to psychological instability or an incurable illness (he suggests AIDS) rather than personal or political pressure.

== Personal life ==
Carlos Rangel's personal life reflected a cosmopolitan sensibility shaped by significant relationships and broad cultural interests. In the early 1950s, while studying in Paris, he eloped with Barbara Barling, an American artist he had met at Bard College. Despite initial resistance from their families, the couple remained married for sixteen years and kept in touch after their divorce. Together, they had four children: Antonio Enrique, Carlos José, Magdalena Teresa, and Diana Cristina.

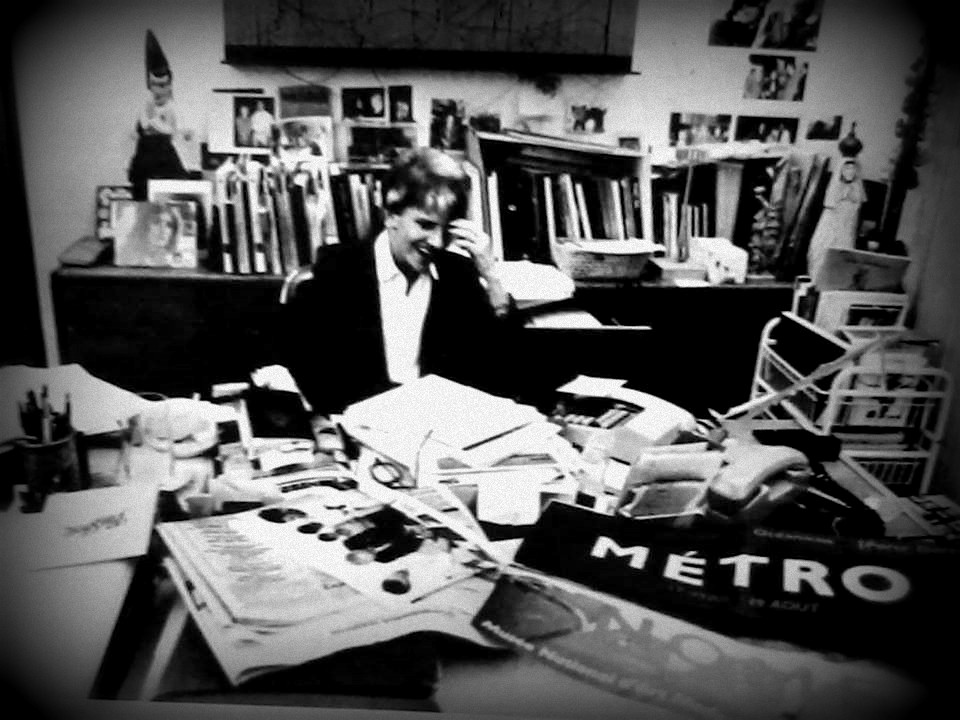
Sofía Imber

In 1969, Rangel married journalist and cultural figure Sofía Ímber, who had previously been married to Venezuelan writer Guillermo Meneses. Imber brought four children from her earlier marriage—Sara, Adriana, Daniela, and Pedro Guillermo—into their blended family. Rangel and Imber would later co-host the influential morning television program Buenos Días, which aired from 1968 to 1988.

Rangel had a deep appreciation for contemporary music, with tastes that included Venezuelan, French, and American folk music, jazz, and The Beatles. He maintained an extensive vinyl collection and a large personal library, which included rare Venezuelan first editions. Following his death, his periodicals and book collections were donated to the Universidad Metropolitana and to the Universidad Católica Andrés Bello, both in Caracas.

An enthusiastic amateur filmmaker, Rangel often recorded family events and vacations with his 8mm camera. Excerpts from these home movies were later featured in the 2015 documentary Carlos Rangel: Ésta es su vida, ésta su libertad, directed by Andrés Crema and produced by Cinesa, with distribution by Bolívar Films. The documentary offers a portrait of Rangel's personal and intellectual life.

With the exception of a brief stay in London from 1971 to 1972, Carlos Rangel spent most of his professional life in Caracas. He lived and worked primarily within a two-square-mile area at the base of the Ávila mountain, between the neighborhoods of Alta Florida, where he was born and raised, and Lomas de San Rafael, La Florida—where he died.

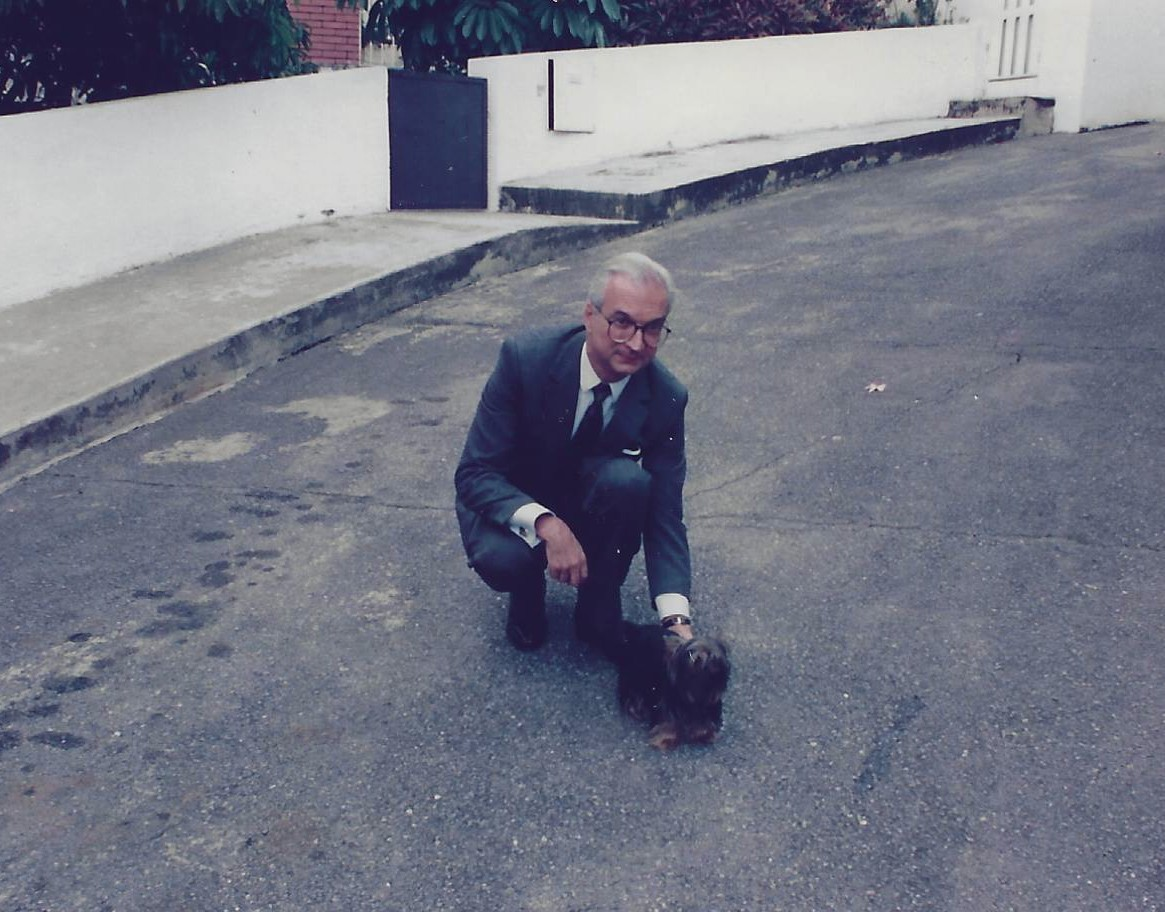
Carlos Rangel and Loni c. 1982

In later years, he often took scenic drives along the Cota Mil (Avenida Boyacá), a highway that runs along the foothills of the Ávila, accompanied by his Yorkshire Terrier, Loni. This was reminiscent of his younger days horseback riding through the open landscapes of pre-urbanized Caracas. On Sundays, he frequently joined Sofía Ímber on hikes along the Ávila's trails. These routines and personal habits were described in interviews conducted in the early 1980s, including a feature in El Nacional, Séptimo Día (c. 1982).

=== Death and funeral ===
Carlos Rangel died on 14 January 1988, at the age of 58. That morning, as part of his routine, he hosted the live broadcast of Buenos Días on Venevisión, with guest Luis Enrique Oberto, a senior figure in the Social Christian Democratic party (COPEI). The programs that week had focused on the party's 42nd anniversary and the ongoing debate within COPEI over its presidential candidate for the upcoming 1988 elections—and whether the patriarch of the party Rafael Caldera would support Eduardo Fernández in challenging the likely Acción Democrática candidate, former president Carlos Andrés Pérez. Following the live segment, as was customary, Rangel and Imber taped Friday's episode which ultimately did not air.

He then attended to professional duties, including meetings at the Museo de Arte Contemporáneo de Caracas and with Beatrice Rangel, regarding the taping of a program to mark the upcoming 30th anniversary of the 1958 popular rebellion that overthrew dictator Marcos Pérez Jiménez. Afterwards he went to his home office study where, by late afternoon, he finalized envelopes to the publisher containing the manuscripts for his last book.

In the early evening, he asked his stepson, Pedro Guillermo, if he could get him a cup of tea from the kitchen. Upon returning to the study, Pedro found that Rangel had died by suicide from a self-inflicted gunshot wound.

Arroyo Gil's biography of Sofía Ímber, describes her immediate reaction after discovering Rangel's death as telephoning her close friend, diplomat and historian Simón Alberto Consalvi. By contrast, in a column for El Nuevo País, journalist Graciela Requena reported that Ímber later recounted having called President Jaime Lusinchi at that moment. Arroyo Gil also reproduces the farewell letter that Rangel left to Ímber, in which Rangel expressed fear of illness and decline, gratitude for their life together, and asked forgiveness. His wife, Sofía, sought to protect his privacy, memory and legacy, originally intending a private burial before dawn. However, the death could not be kept from the public. At her behest, President Jaime Lusinchi, a medical doctor by training, arrived at the residence, pronounced Rangel deceased, and signed the death certificate. Minister of the Interior Simón Alberto Consalvi, as head of all internal security forces, authorized the removal of the body. The legal obligation of an autopsy led to a leak from the morgue, and the news of Carlos Rangel's death broke on the 11 PM news broadcast. Many—including his mother, brother, and children—learned of his death from the broadcast.

Public mourning followed quickly. A crowd of political leaders, intellectuals, and ordinary Venezuelans gathered at Funeraria Vallés in Caracas from well before dawn the next morning. Despite no public announcement, hundreds arrived to pay respects, including close friends, members of the government, and former collaborators. His wife, Sofia, said: "It was a Thursday, I remember. Thursday, January 14, 1988. The next day was the wake. All of Caracas came to accompany me. Some only out of curiosity. Before that dreadful crowd began to arrive, together with my children I saw Carlos's face for the last time and ordered that the coffin be closed."

By 10:30AM the throng of mourners was impenetrable. Among the crowd was Alfonso Arismendi, a young man that years earlier, when Rangel presided the City Council, had been taken in by him as his godson. Stepsisters Diana and Daniela mourned together. Magdalena, his eldest daughter, and Sara and Adriana, his other two stepdaughters, were not in attendance because they were out of the country at the time.

The pallbearers included Rangel's two sons, his stepson, his long-trusted former chauffeur, Alejandro Ponce, Luis Teófilo Núñez, the president of El Universal newspaper (where Rangel published many columns), and José Rafael Revenga, CEO of the Venevisión TV network (where "Buenos Dias" aired), all led by both President Jaime Lusinchi and the former and future president, Carlos Andrés Pérez, at the head on either side.

The procession departed towards the cemetery with a presidential escort, motorcycles stopping traffic at stoplights to allow the motorcade to pass through. It arrived at Cementerio del Este, where a small crowd of close family and friends gathered. President Pérez delivered a brief eulogy saying: "Carlos will always be for me, and surely for many of us, an open book that we will read to learn consequential lessons and lessons of love for Venezuela, lessons of Venezuelan dignity and human dignity. See you later, Carlos, on behalf of all Venezuelans." As the casket lowered, Rangel's daughter Diana tossed a small golden cross necklace in.

The account is based on interviews and recollections by Carlos J. Rangel, Sofía Ímber, Simón Alberto Consalvi, Beatrice Rangel, Pedro and Adriana Meneses, and corroborated by contemporary press coverage.

=== Suicide and mental illness ===
Though often discussed quietly, Carlos Rangel's death by suicide on 14 January 1988, prompted reflection and debate about his mental health and personal circumstances. Some attributed it to depression, or perhaps a chronic illness that created constant pain or which he believed would cause a progressive decline. Years later his wife, Sofia, said that Rangel was scheduled to meet, Dr. Manuel Kizer, a psychiatrist and psychologist, on 15 January regarding a “deep depression manifested physically as a chronic pain in the leg. His longtime physician, Dr. Rubén Coronil, has been cited in oral accounts as denying that Rangel had a chronic or life-threatening condition, but such statements have not been published in reliable sources.

In a recollection published in El País, Mario Vargas Llosa described his version of the event: Rangel shot himself while his wife, Sofía Ímber, briefly left the house to post a package. Vargas Llosa also noted that rumors circulated after his death, including suggestions of a family history of suicide—which had first appeared as a headline in the tabloid Últimas Noticias—and the idea that Rangel may have felt intellectually at peace, believing Latin America was moving toward democracy. Vargas Llosa's speculation on Rangel's motive may be supported by speeches like the ones Rangel gave to the first promotion of the executive program at IESA in 1984, or his speech at the inauguration of the think tank CEDICE in 1985. These can be interpreted as showcasing an established path towards economic freedom and progress. But this interpretation was tempered publicly by Rangel in other appearances which often appear associated to labels. memes or headlines such as “the man who Venezuela did not listen to” or labeling him as a prophet. Many of these clips have come from an extensive interview conducted by Marcel Granier in 1984 in which (min. 55 and following) Rangel talks about the political consequences of economic mismanagement leading to fierce dictatorship and tyranny. This interview, along with his speech to the Association of Venezuelan Executives in 1984, and his Postscript to the Latin Americans in 1987 indicate that Rangel was well aware of the continued fragile condition of democracy and freedom in his country and the region.

Reactions in the Venezuelan press reflected Rangel's contested legacy. Writing in El Nacional, Antonio Sánchez García remembered him as a brilliant liberal intellectual whose life ended tragically, also recalling that Rangel's father had died by suicide; his column coincided in many respects with Vargas Llosa's interpretation. By contrast, in Aporrea, José Sant Roz characterized Rangel as an "estremecedor lacayo" and speculated on medical motives, though without documentary evidence.

Although suicide was a sensitive topic in his time, and in many ways still is, it was not entirely uncommon in Rangel's circles. His father and a maternal half-aunt had both died by suicide. In political and personal spheres, he had known closely others who had taken their lives, including prominent politician Alirio Ugarte Pelayo in 1966, and his close associate and Momento director Carlos Ramírez MacGregor in 1975.

Rangel's final day was marked by routine activities and apparent normalcy, apparently including the completion and dispatch of the manuscript for his third book. He left two typewritten notes: one addressed to his wife, Sofía Ímber, written on a typewriter and signed in his usual personal style—possibly at his office at the museum, perhaps that day or days or weeks earlier—and another brief note addressed to the police, written at home on a different typewriter and signed with his formal legal signature, affirming the intentional nature of his death. Forensic analysis indicates that both notes were written on the same type of typewriter (probably an IBM Selectric), but with different settings, suggesting they were written at different times. Neither note nor his official note left for the police mention his or Sofía's children. His final manuscript, containing a comprehensive view of his intellectual legacy and interests, has been interpreted by some as a symbolic testament or a third message to the public.

=== Messages ===
In the days following his death, numerous tributes and obituaries were published in Venezuelan media outlets such as El Nacional and El Universal, as well as international publications. French intellectual Jean-François Revel, who had written forewords for Rangel's books, penned a tribute highlighting Rangel's contributions to liberal thought in Latin America.

Messages came from around the world: from the U.S., former President Jimmy Carter; from Spain, the Chief of Government Felipe González; and from Israel, England, France, and many other countries, leaders from all walks of life sent condolences.

Sofía Ímber, determined to soldier on, returned on Monday, 18 January to her TV program. The transcript for that day's program is not available, but the next day she read aloud a message from William Luers, former U.S. ambassador to Venezuela and then-director of the Metropolitan Museum of Art in New York:

I am shocked to learn of Carlos's death. Neither you nor he can fully realize how deeply his presence has shaped my life of learning. His wisdom and his intellectual and emotional commitment to the most important issues of our time place him as a man without equal in his generation. ... His passing leaves a void in my heart and in the minds of those who care about civilized society. The world will be a different and less stimulating place without him.

She also read a message from Nicomedes Zuloaga, major business leader and co-founder, along with Carlos Rangel and others, of the libertarian think tank CEDICE Libertad in Caracas:

I have no words. I only assure you that, in addition to all of us, liberty itself will mourn for Carlos.

Other notable statements included:

President Jaime Lusinchi (Venezuela): "Carlos Rangel was an exceptional man... his death is an irreparable loss for the country."

Jean-François Revel (France): "Carlos Rangel's death leaves liberal thought in Latin America orphaned."

Despite widespread coverage of his death, some historical references have inaccurately cited the date as 15 January, likely due to the swift burial. Contemporary obituaries in the New York Times and Los Angeles Times, as well as the inscription on Rangel's tombstone, confirm that he died on Thursday, 14 January 1988, at approximately 6:30 PM.

== English bibliography ==
- Rangel, Carlos (1976). From the Noble Savage to the Noble Revolutionary.
- Rangel, Carlos (1977). The Latin Americans : their love-hate relationship with the United States. New York: Harcourt Brace Jovanovich.
- Rangel, Carlos (1986). Third world ideology and Western reality : manufacturing political myth. New Brunswick: Transaction Books.

== Spanish bibliography ==
- Rangel, Carlos (1976). Del buen salvaje al buen revolucionario : mitos y realidades de América Latina. Caracas: Monte Avila Editores.
- Rangel, Carlos (1982). El tercermundismo. Caracas: Monte Avila Editores.
- Rangel, Carlos (1988). Marx y los socialismos reales y otros ensayos. Caracas: Monte Avila Editores.
