= From the Noble Savage to the Noble Revolutionary =

1976 book by Carlos Rangel

Del buen salvaje al buen revolucionario
- Cover of the book
- Author: Carlos Rangel
- Publication date: 1976
- Publication place: Venezuela
- Pages: 397
- ISBN: 8437700493
- Followed by: El tercermundismo

The Latin Americans: Their Love-Hate Relationship with the United States is the English-language title of a 1976 book by Venezuelan journalist and author Carlos Rangel, originally published in Spanish as Del buen salvaje al buen revolucionario: Mitos y realidades en América Latina (From Noble Savage to Noble Revolutionary: Myths and Realities in Latin America). The book explores what the author argues are the ideological foundations and cultural reasons for Latin American underdevelopment.

The title was changed from its original version for the English edition, published in 1977 by Harcourt Brace Jovanovich under the Kurt Wolff imprint. In a contemporary account in The New York Times, Helen Wolff did not explicitly address this retitling but, as she included Rangel's book on a list of notable publications in the forthcoming catalogue of the imprint, she remarked that its title—The Latin Americans: Their Love-Hate Relationship with the U.S.—represented a fresh and potentially appealing approach for U.S. readers, in contrast with the more accusatory tone of many contemporaneous Latin American works on the United States.

The discrepancy in titles has led to occasional confusion regarding the book's content and intent. This has been noted in retrospective commentary, including a 2016 lecture by journalist Russ Dallen marking the book's 40th anniversary at the University of Miami, and in remarks delivered by Carlos J. Rangel at the 2023 launch of the Italian edition published by the Bruno Leoni Institute in Milan. For consistency, this article refers to the book by its abbreviated English title The Latin Americans.

== Reception ==
First published in Paris (February 19, 1976) and Caracas (May 3, 1976), and in New York (1977), the work unfolds in nine thematic essays and a postscript written ten years after the first edition. The theoretical and ideological positions of the book caused great controversy at the time. In early June 1976, copies of the book were publicly burned at the Central University of Venezuela. Rangel himself, in a “Postscript” written ten years after the book was first published, refers to a reviewer (unnamed) in the U.S. that said, noting that the book was printed in recycled paper, that “at least the trees were spared.”

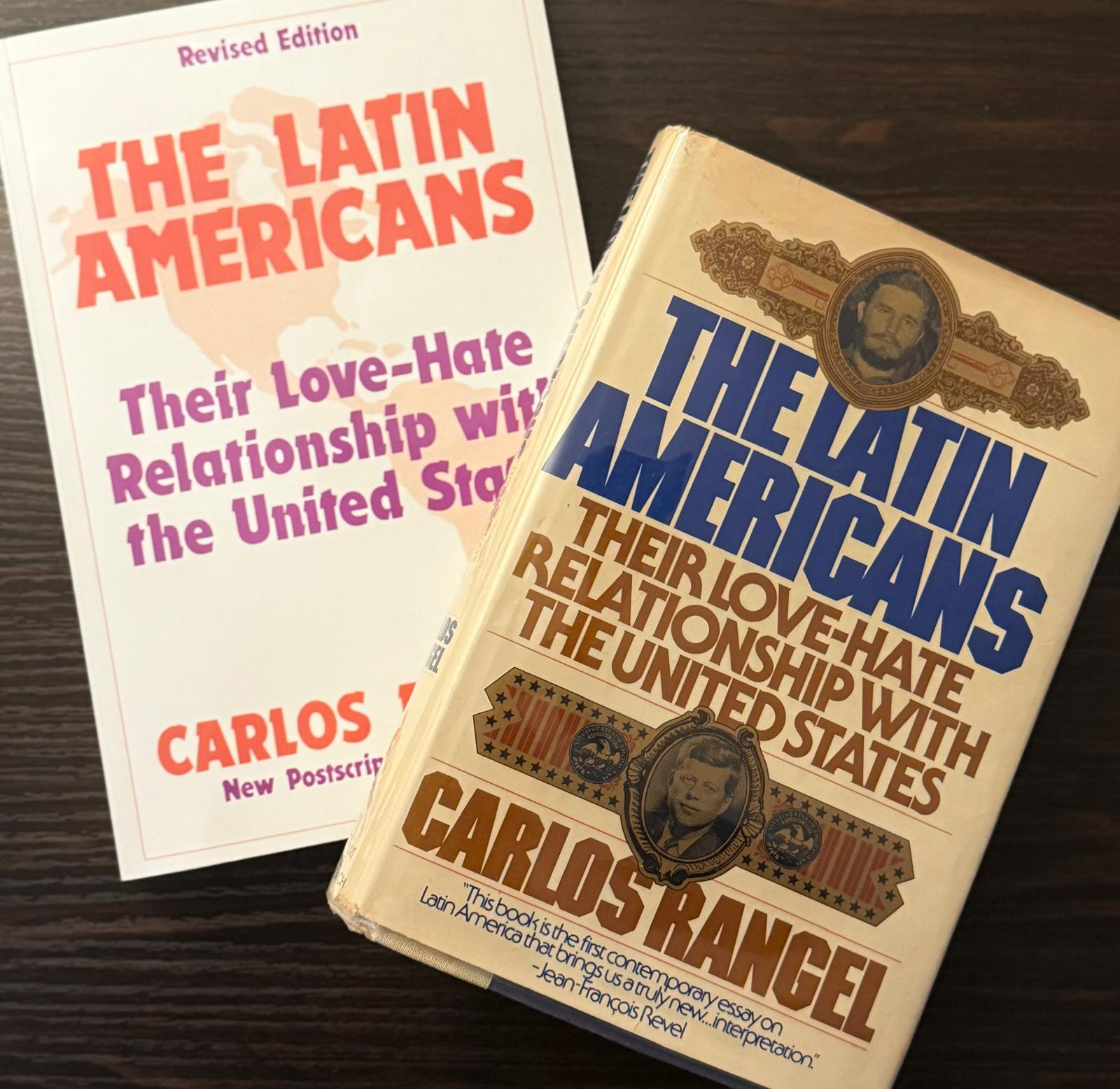
First and second edition of "The Latin Americans" by Carlos Rangel

Commenting on the book burning incident on their TV program (named Lo de hoy at the time), Rangel and his wife Sofía Ímber, while condemning it, remarked that Venezuela was a functioning democracy and that over 10,000 copies of the book had been sold in three months, dismissing the burning as an isolated incident led by one professor with a few students. Rangel said that far more distressing was the fact that a publisher in Argentina willing to launch the book could not find a printing press willing to print it for fear of assassination during the violent political instability at the time of General Jorge Rafael Videla’s dictatorship. In a later program, Carlos and Sofía were commenting about a recent interview with Manuel Fraga and how the book was in “import review,” Sofía called it “censorship,” before allowing its publication in the post Francisco Franco’s transitionary Spain. Print editions were later published in both countries. The book has had over sixteen editions in Spanish and has been translated into English, French, Italian, and Portuguese. The prologue was written by French philosopher Jean-François Revel. An epilogue, on the occasion of the book's thirtieth anniversary in 2006, was written by the Cuban political analyst Carlos Alberto Montaner.

Outside of Latin America the book has served as a reference point for debates on development and democracy. Renowned U.S. scholars such as Lawrence Harrison in 1984 have dedicated articles to the book and its relevance to the debate on Dependency theory. A 1994 Baltimore Sun column on Emiliano Zapata invoked Rangel’s critique of “the good revolutionary” to challenge romantic views of agrarian revolt, Business Vision’s retrospective in 2015 calls Rangel “an early and vocal critic of the left’s myth of the noble savage,” placing him alongside Mario Vargas Llosa and Octavio Paz in the region’s liberal lineage, while an opinion piece in South Korea’s JoongAng Daily in 2010 cited the work when urging confidence in liberal institutions over populist nationalism. The International Center for the Arts of the Americas, (ICAA) at the Museum of Fine Arts Houston’s Latin-American art archive, lists the book among foundational texts for understanding post-colonial discourse in the visual arts. The Latin Americans and Rangel’s legacy were the subject of a roundtable discussion at Mont Pelerin Society’s annual convention held in Mexico City in 2025.

Álvaro Vargas Llosa argues that Rangel's text "remains more relevant than ever" because it confronts "Latin America's tendency to cloak itself in victimhood", while Fundación Bases hails it as "one of the best essays written in the last century" for exposing the costs of anti-capitalist populism. Scholars also credit the essay with anticipating later critiques of “twenty-first-century socialism.” Brookings Institution analyses of Hugo Chávez’s Venezuela and Impunity Observer commentaries on regional authoritarianism both echo Rangel’s warning that blaming the United States or global capitalism obscures local responsibility.

The book is a controversial reference for classical-liberal critiques of populism. While praised by liberal thinkers such as Jean-François Revel, Carlos Alberto Montaner, Loris Zanatta, and Mario Vargas Llosa, it was attacked by many in the Latin American left for undermining anti-imperialist narratives, and some called it a reactionary pamphlet. To some critics, Rangel's book is the antithesis to the book Open Veins of Latin America published in 1971 by Eduardo Galeano, an icon of the Latin American left-wing.

=== Core Arguments ===
The five major introductions to the book -by J.F. Revel (1976), C. A. Montaner (2006), C.J. Rangel (2019), L. Zanatta (2023), and C. Granés (2024)- identify Rangel’s three central cultural and ideological narratives driving authoritarianism and underdevelopment: the idealization of the pre-Columbian "noble savage," the widespread rejection of Western liberalism—particularly the United States—and the belief that revolution inherently leads to justice. For Rangel these ideas, tinted with Marxist interpretations, anti-American sentiment, and moralistic discourse, have hindered the region’s progress toward liberal democracy and the rule of law.

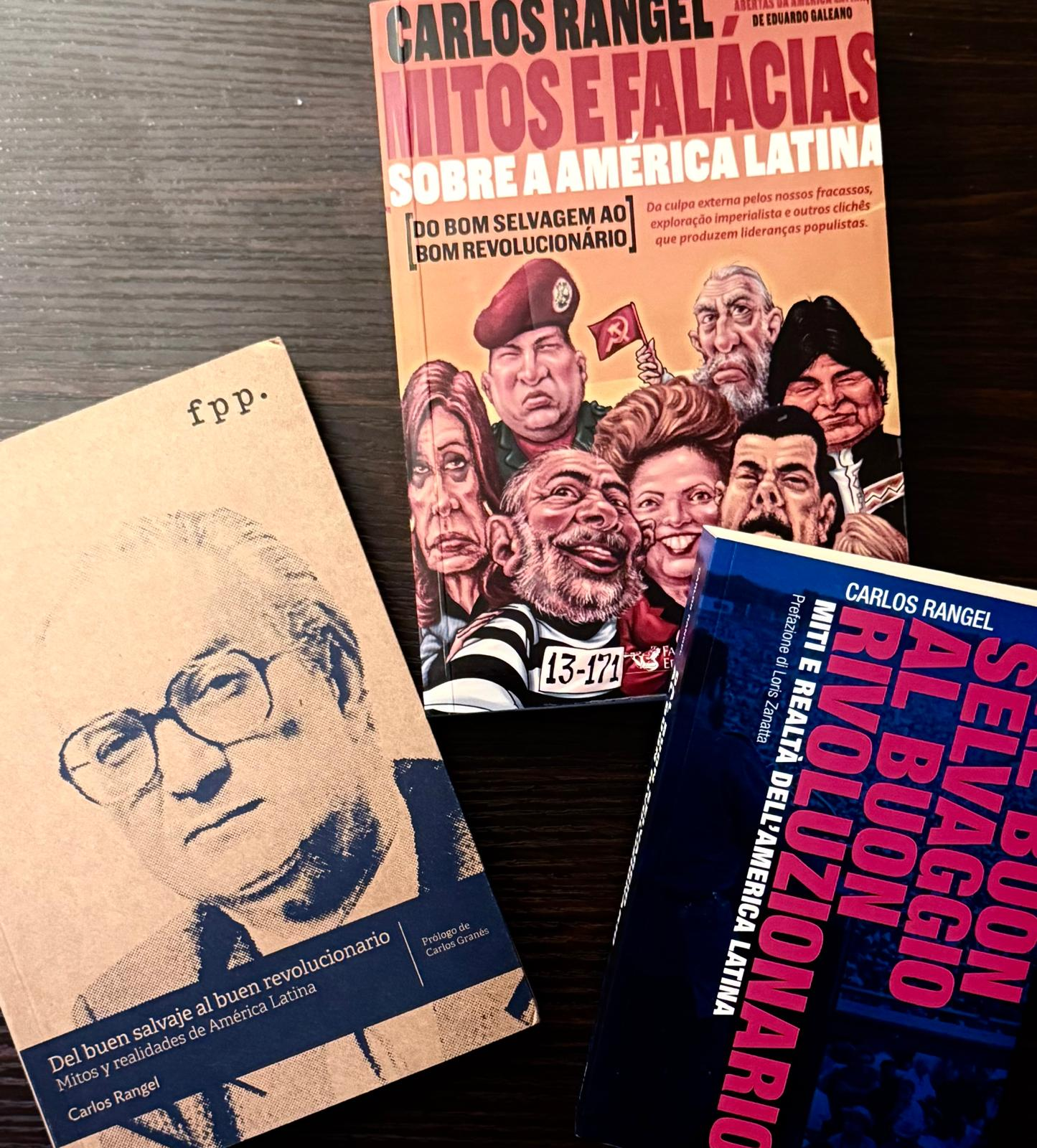
Recent print editions of "Del buen salvaje al buen revolucionario" by Carlos Rangel

Rangel’s main argument is that despite ideological differences most Latin American political regimes—left or right, civilian or military—have converged on an illiberal core resulting in a persistent authoritarian streak. However, the author also finds a strong potential for political liberalism which he argues, when it has surfaced, has resulted in (imperfect) democracies coinciding with the most prosperous times in the region. Jean-François Revel calls this the “Rangel Law,” which he expresses as “every time the people, real persons, freely vote in elections that are not manipulated, they choose moderate solutions, parties from the center-right or the center-left. The legendary Latin American extremism is an elitist phenomenon. The intellectuals, military, fascists, and revolutionaries that have fought for power during centuries, shooting rifles and fiery rhetoric against each other, are opposing oligarchies, anxious to satisfy their appetite for domination (not to mention their financial appetites)”

=== Counterarguments to the Book ===
A few months after Carlos Rangel’s death Manuel Caballero, a Venezuelan scholar and historian, penned a thoughtful critique of the book (and of Carlos Rangel’s legacy) in an essay titled “Para una radiografía del pensamiento reaccionario” in which he argues that The Latin Americans is a polemical, ideologically driven text that caricatures the Latin American left and lacks scholarly rigor. Rangel himself never qualified the book as a scholarly treatise, only as an extended opinion essay attempting to diagnose an issue, not a prescriptive solution. Perhaps in response to early critiques regarding the “unscholarly” approach to his long form essay, Rangel ensured that his English language edition, published a year after the Spanish, included a large number of sourced references. By Caballero's admission in his 1988 critique that he reread that original Spanish, 1972, edition, he was not privy to these references. More references based on mentions by Rangel identified within the book, have been incorporated in editions after 2024.

Caballero’s key challenge, to Rangel generally and to the book itself, is based on Jean Francois Revel’s assertion in the preface to Rangel’s posthumous third book Marx and the Real Socialisms and other Essays. Revel says in this prologue that Rangel was a sincere intellectual in constant pursuit of truth and the unmasking of myths. Caballero, on the other hand, argues that Rangel’s work simplifies complex realities and uses “truth” as a rhetorical weapon because, Caballero asserts, truth cannot be devoid of context, ideology and historical perspective (a Sartreian - “Billancourt” – perspective confronted directly by Rangel in his third book as part of his argument on the intellectual’s responsibility to society). According to Caballero, unless truth conforms to its context it becomes a rhetoric of certainty transformed into dogma, and Rangel’s use of truth as dogma leads to a world view akin to Stalinism, a simplistic binary world of contrasts between barbarianism vs civilization, rationalism vs. revolution, capitalism vs. communism, etc. The central tenet of Caballero's counterargument, and that of the left-wing intelligentsia at the time, was Rangel's contention, presented as an incontrovertible truth, that Latin America remains backward and underdeveloped. Caballero's question (and that of Rangel's critics) is, "Backwardness and underdevelopment in relation to what?" asserting that the United States is not a model to follow.

While The Latin Americans is dismissed by Caballero as a reactionary pamphlet using rhetorical acrobatics to make its point, Caballero’s own later writings—such as “En la oposición, como siempre” (1998)— and steadfast opposition to Hugo Chávez beginning in 1992 reflect a shift closer to Rangel’s critique of ideological falsehoods.

Over the decades liberal commentators have treated the book as a counter-canon to the dependency-theory literature that dominated the 1970s, epitomized by Eduardo Galeano’s The Open Veins of Latin America (1971). In this book Galeano argued that the underdevelopment of the region was a direct result of historic colonial exploitation, evolved into imperialist exploitation by foreign capitalist powers or local capitalist elites. Much later, however, Galeano distanced himself from his own book. During the II Bienal do Livro e da Leitura in Brasília in April 2014, stated in a press conference: "I wouldn't be able to read [Open Veins…] again. I'd keel over. For me, that traditional leftist prose is extremely tedious. My body couldn't take it. I'd end up in the hospital... It tried to be a work of political economy, but I lacked the necessary training.”

== Main Themes ==
Scholars and Think Tanks have identified the major thematic elements in the book as follows:

=== Objecting to the myth of the noble savage ===
The main myth that Rangel seeks to debunk is what he identifies as an adapted version of the myth of the noble savage and the Golden Age - Old World myths - in which indigenous Latin Americans were good people corrupted by their “encounter” with western society. This myth (as old as Montaigne’s essays, argues that western values have substituted/destroyed original “noble” values and that it will be necessary to restore these through revolutions, cleaving Latin America from the West to reestablish a lost identity different from the Western one.

According to Rangel, this mythology would be the result of a compensatory process in the face of the historical failure of the Hispano-American nations in the face of the progress of the European and North American nations, which in some cases started from the same or worse conditions. Transforming a previous society into another requires time and the Meso and South American societies have the challenge of achieving it.

=== Rejection of Latin American victimism ===
The author uses analysis in the field of history, psychology and philosophy in the book. Rangel does not deny that Latin America has suffered abuses throughout history; what he rejects is the nationalist victimism that transfers all blame for underdevelopment to other nations and the existence of a Latin American identity different from the West.

=== Criticism of the "noble revolutionary" ===
For Rangel the mistaken vision of Latin America, both from within and from external influencers, as a victim of the developed world and/or the wealthy classes has forged a stock character, the "noble revolutionary", who promotes populism, nationalism, protectionism, caudillismo and authoritarianism as a solution for the region "in revenge" for the abused received under Western hegemony. Any excesses or “temporary” outbursts must be excused in the name of his "noble cause," the revolution.

For the author, the revolution, populism and idolatry of the state of the Latin American "noble revolutionary" is nothing more than a continuation of a (flawed) heritage forged from pre-Columbian societies, the colonial period and the nineteenth-century fratricidal republics; as such, he argues, “noble revolutions” would not correct but aggravate that heritage. In his “Post Scriptum” (written 10 years after the first edition) he argues that the true revolution in Latin America would be to create liberal democracies free from the burden of that authoritarian heritage that has kept the region from fulfilling its potential.

=== Defense of the West: Spanish America ===
Carlos Rangel argues in favor of Western values hated by the "noble revolutionary" which, according to the book, are foolishly blamed for the ills of the Hispano-American nations. For the author, the solution to Latin America's stagnation - which Rangel prefers to call Spanish America - is its rapprochement with the West, of which Rangel says it is truly part, of which it is part, through liberalism and its values favorable to individual sovereignty, equality before the law, private property, and freedom without conditions, and that this path would be the one that leads to prosperity as Western society demonstrates.

== Structure and contents ==
Carlos Rangel opens with a stark thesis: Latin America, to date, has been a failure. This sweeping judgment is grounded in two emblematic sources distanced in geography and time: Simón Bolívar’s early 19th-century lament and Carlos Fuentes’s 20th-century critique of a modernity that never fully arrived. Rangel argues that Latin America has persistently misread both itself and the outside world. In its unsuccessful attempts to emulate prosperous nations, the region has clung to comforting myths to rationalize its stagnation rather than taking hard corrective action. These myths, while emotionally satisfying, serve as obstacles to genuine reform. The fundamental question driving the book, as stated in the introduction is: why is it that Latin America has not been as, or more, successful than North America within the same or greater historical time frame?

Divided into thematic chapters, the book examines:

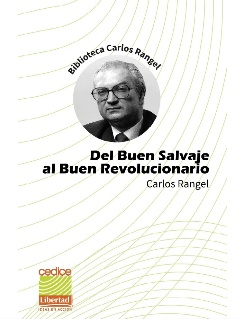
Biblioteca Carlos Rangel

=== The origins of Latin American identity myths (Chapter 1) ===
In this opening chapter, Rangel dissects the origin and political function of two influential myths in Latin America: the idealized “noble savage” and its modern offshoot, the “noble revolutionary.” He contends that both are romanticized projections born in Europe, later imported and internalized by Latin American elites to rationalize underdevelopment, reject liberal democracy, and embrace authoritarian ideologies. His thesis is that Latin America's foundational identity was shaped by Old World fantasies. Jean François Revel centers his prologue on this aspect of the book.

=== The ambivalent relationship of Latin America with the United States (Chapter 2) ===
This chapter explores the historical, cultural, and ideological dynamics between Latin America and the United States, challenging mainstreamed narratives of victimization and imperialism. While not exempting the U.S. from using abusive power to further its interests (and illustrating this with examples), Rangel traces a nuanced, often uncomfortable genealogy of mutual (mis)perceptions, arguing that Latin America’s rejection of the U.S. stems less from actual imperialist oppression than from envy, guilt, and the projection of internal failures onto an external power. Rangel emphasizes the comfortable seduction of anti-Americanism and warns against its long-term consequences for liberty and democracy in the region.

In the second edition published by Transaction Publishers (1987), Rangel added a section to this chapter, updating it to reflect events in Nicaragua and the early Reagan administration. This second edition also includes a “Potscriptum” reflecting on the book ten years after its original publication.

=== The distinction between heroic ideals and institutional norms (Chapter 3) ===
This chapter explores how Latin America glorifies rebellion and personal heroism over institutional order and the rule of law. Using Bolívar, Perón, and others as examples, Rangel critiques the cultural pattern of valuing charismatic leaders who defy legality in the name of justice. The result is a persistent mythologizing of political disruption (revolution). True liberal democracy, he argues, requires shifting from heroic narratives to constitutional normalcy. This glorification of revolutionary figures and national "heroes" undermines the creation of a rule-based society. Latin America’s political culture has historically favored personalist authority over institutional development, replacing republican ideals with emotionally charged mythologies of betrayal and redemption.

=== Romantic-nationalist and racialist ideologies (Chapter 4) ===
Rangel opens this chapter exploring the foundational dichotomy in Latin American political thought—civilization versus barbarism—as famously articulated by Sarmiento [citation note]. He criticizes the romanticization of the indigenous and rural world as morally superior, suggesting that this inversion of values underpins much of the anti-Western and anti-modern political rhetoric in the region. He warns that this mythic binary has hindered the development of liberal democracy and market institutions and is a root of what he calls “telurism” an adoption of the ancestral past of a territory by recent arrivals to it (pp. 88–91). This persistent valorization in Latin America of "barbarism" as pure and native, over "civilization" as corrupt and alien impedes the region’s progress toward liberal democratic norms. He also addresses the persistent and pernicious latent racism in Latin American society, tracing its roots from colonial times.

=== The enduring allure of Marxist revolutionary theory (Chapter 5) ===
This is the longest and densest chapter of Del buen salvaje al buen revolucionario. It explores how Marxist ideas—both classical and Leninist—were misunderstood, misapplied, or opportunistically manipulated in Latin America. Rangel’s tone is polemical but scholarly, tracing the roots of Marxist ideology in the region, and showing how its local adaptation supported a victimhood-based political culture. Montaner, in his epilogue to the 30th anniversary edition, and Granés on the 2024 Chilean edition focus their commentaries on the book on this aspect of false victimization

Rangel criticizes the “Third World ideology” narrative, portraying it as a convenient mythology that shields authoritarianism and economic mismanagement. His second book, “Third World Ideology” explores these themes as applicable to the US – USSR hegemonic rivalry worldwide manifested as the Cold War, rivalry with consequences on the geopolitical landscape to this day. In an interview on the book, Rangel argues that Marxism in a way supplanted Catholicism to fulfill the needs for a redeeming belief, so this chapter segues into the next one, on the Catholic church in Latin America.

=== The politicization of the Catholic Church (Chapter 6) ===
In this chapter, Carlos Rangel explores the complex, ambivalent role of the Catholic Church in Latin American history. Far from being a purely spiritual institution, Rangel argues, the Church was a foundational political actor in the formation of colonial and republican Latin America. It served as both ideological pillar and administrative tool of Spanish imperialism and later adapted to modern liberal and Marxist discourses, often contradicting its own traditions. Rangel traces the transformation from omnipotence to marginalization, and later to political re-engagement through Liberation Theology. He challenges the prevailing romanticism around the Church’s social role, positing instead its deep complicity with authoritarianism and its intellectual inconsistency. In the 2024 Italian edition published by Istituto Bruno Leoni, Loris Zanatta’s introduction focuses on this aspect of the book,

=== Deep-seated cultural distortions around property, labor, and history (Chapters 7–8) ===
In a two-part essay which he calls “Uncomfortable Truths,” Carlos Rangel pivots from criticizing external ideological myths to confronting the self-inflicted delusions embedded in Latin American political culture and society. In these sections the author purports to “unmask myths” that distort realities inc contemporary Latin America. He challenges the region’s romantic nationalism, anti-liberal intellectualism, and reliance on collective victimhood, arguing that these ideas have become barriers to liberty, justice, and democratic governance.

Across both chapters, Rangel debunks foundational narratives such as the glorification of the Inca socialist model, the myth of racial or moral exceptionalism, and the portrayal of the state as a benevolent landlord. He exposes how populism, indigenismo, and third-world ideology distort policy and perpetuate dependency. At the root of it all is a pervasive refusal to accept individual responsibility and the evasion of truth, both historical and institutional. His message is uncompromising: unless Latin Americans reject these myths and embrace a culture of accountability, reason, and universal liberal values, they will remain trapped in a cycle of underdevelopment, authoritarian rule, and intellectual self-sabotage.

=== The structural patterns of political power, including caudillismo and military populism ===
In the French and English language editions this section is presented in one chapter (Chapter 9: The Forms of Political Power in Latin America”). In the original Spanish edition and subsequent editions based on it, it is presented in three chapters. (Chapters 9–11).

In this three-part essay, Carlos Rangel deconstructs the prevailing models of political power in Latin America, arguing that the region’s persistent authoritarianism and anti-liberal reflexes are not the legacy of external interference, but of internal cultural and institutional continuities. From charismatic military caudillos to messianic civilian populists, the Latin American state has repeatedly been an agent of clientelism, paternalism, and centralized control. The liberal democratic experiment, though attempted in various contexts, has remained fragile and often short-lived. To breakdown its contents, the following breaks the essay into the three parts as presented in the original Spanish language edition.

Chapter 9 — Las formas del poder político latinoamericano (1) — identifies key archetypes of power: the caudillo, the consular presidency, the militarized party-state, and movements like Peronism that perpetuate dependency and political infantilism.

Chapter 10 — Las formas del poder político latinoamericano (2) — presents the exceptions to the rule: democratic efforts in Venezuela under Rómulo Betancourt and the Chilean experience under Eduardo Frei. But even these are portrayed as tenuous, often sabotaged by Marxist-Leninist dogma and populist opportunism. He further examines Salvador Allende’s failed experiment (1970–1973) and characterizes it as a paradigmatic failure of Marxist democratic socialism in Latin America, arguing that Chile's attempt to transition to socialism via legal, democratic means—hailed by many on the international left—ultimately resulted in political polarization, economic collapse, and civil conflict. Allende’s Chile serves for Rangel as a cautionary tale of what happens when ideological utopianism overrides institutional limits and economic reality.

Chapter 11 — Las formas del poder político latinoamericano (3) — analyzes the so-called "Peruvian model" of military reformism and media control, ending with a warning about the emergence of technocratic or pseudo-progressive strongmen—"the last consular caudillos"—who use modern tools to suppress dissent while retaining autocratic power.

=== Hindsight: "Postscripum" ===
And finally, a “Postscript” written ten years later, reaffirming the dangers of populist utopias and Latin America's resistance to liberal modernity. In this epilogue, Rangel reaffirms the central thesis of The Latin Americans: that the region’s dysfunction stems not from external oppression but from internalized myths that excuse authoritarianism, underdevelopment, and a rejection of liberal democracy. He argues that, despite some progress, the region remains largely trapped in the same ideological cul-de-sacs begat by what he had referred to as Octavio Paz’s “constitutional lies.” The persistence of Marxist rhetoric, the resurgence of caudillismo in new guises, and the intellectual elite’s disdain for liberal institutions continue to inhibit true political and economic modernization.

Ten years later, Rangel remains convinced that Latin America’s cultural and intellectual resistance to classical liberalism — often cloaked in nationalist, Marxist, or religious rhetoric — is the principal barrier to progress. In a 1976 interview conducted by Sofia Imber on their co-hosted program “Buenos Días,” Rangel selected to read an epigraph he had included in the book that epitomizes not only this book, but his general view on truth and falsehoods affecting political and personal rhetoric as developed in his subsequent books and career. Quoting Octavio Paz's The Labyrinth of Solitude he reads: “Lying became almost constitutional in our countries. The moral damage has been incalculable and reached deep into our being; we move easily within falsehood. Therefore, the fight against official and constitutional lying must be at the root of any serious reform in Latin America.” Twelve years later, in 1988, Jean François Revel writing the preface to Rangel’s posthumous book described Rangel as an intellectual always in pursuit of the truth.

== Publication history ==
The book was first published in French (1976) at Jean-François Revel's urging. While all other language editions kept the same title, translated, the English editions were retitled The Latin Americans: Their Love-Hate Relationship with the United States. During an event celebrating the 40th anniversary of the book, one of the speakers, Russ Dallen, former owner of the Caracas’ Daily Journal and later publisher of the Latin American Herald Tribune pointed out that this discrepancy, at first had confused him. As a Fellow in Columbia University he had come across The Latin Americans which, to him, was a career transforming book. Later in life, living in Caracas, he said he was surprised to realize that the book that all his new acquaintances were recommending to him to understand his new country of residence was the same one that he had read years ago in college. Years later Carlos J. Rangel, the author’s son, when presenting a new Italian translation of the book at the Bruno Leoni Institute, in Milan in 2023, referred to that incident, suggesting that, while it may have been an editorial decision by the American publisher Helen Wolff, the dual naming reflects the multidimensional reading of the book which Carlos Rangel, the author, seemed to have welcomed.

== Editions ==
- 1976 — France (French) Du bon sauvage au bon révolutionnaire, Robert Laffont – Libertés 2000 series, 397 pp.
- 1976 — Venezuela (Spanish) Del buen salvaje al buen revolucionario, Monte Ávila Editores, paperback – 1st Spanish edition (preface by Jean François Revel). This edition had at least eight reprints between 1976 and 1982.
- 1976 — Lisboa, Portugal – Ulisseia released the first Portuguese translation under the title Do bom selvagem ao bom revolucionário, 409 pp.
- 1977 — USA (English) The Latin Americans: Their Love Hate Relationship with the United States, Harcourt Brace Jovanovich (Helen and Kurt Wolff Books imprint) – English translation from the French text. ISBN 0-15148795-2.
- 1980 — Torino, Italy – Edizioni di Comunità published the first Italian edition, Dal buon selvaggio al buon rivoluzionario, 397 pp.
- 1981 — Brasília, Brazil – Editora Universidade de Brasília (UnB) issued a Brazilian Portuguese re-edition (276 pp., tr. B. S. Otero) that circulated widely in São Paulo and Rio.
- 1987 — New York, USA (English, print) The Latin Americans… – Transaction Publishers (Routledge), 2nd edition, 332 pp, ISBN 978-0887386923. Currently available as POD from Taylor Francis / Routledge.
- 2005 — Venezuela (Spanish) Pocket edition published by Editorial Criteria (316 pp).
- 2014 — Spain (Spanish) Gota a Gota published a paperback & Kindle edition.
- 2015 — Venezuela (Spanish) Libertaria published a paperback 30th anniversary edition distributed by El Nacional (394 pp).
- 2019 — Brazil (Portuguese) Faro Editorial published a new translation under the name Mitos e Falácias Sobre a América Latina (352 pp.). ISBN 978-85-9581-059-4.
- 2021 — Caracas, Venezuela (Spanish, digital) CEDICE Libertad – digital edition of Del buen salvaje al buen revolucionario (part of Biblioteca Carlos Rangel series). ISBN 978-980-434-013-0
- 2023 — Italy (Italian) Dal buon selvaggio al buon rivoluzionario, IBL Libri – (Kindle & paperback, 473 pp). ISBN 978-88-6440-522-3
- 2023 — Santiago, Chile (Spanish), Fundación para el Progreso, 1st Chilean edition, 461 pp. ISBN 978-956-92253-5-2.
