= Sofía Ímber =

Venezuelan journalist and cultural activist

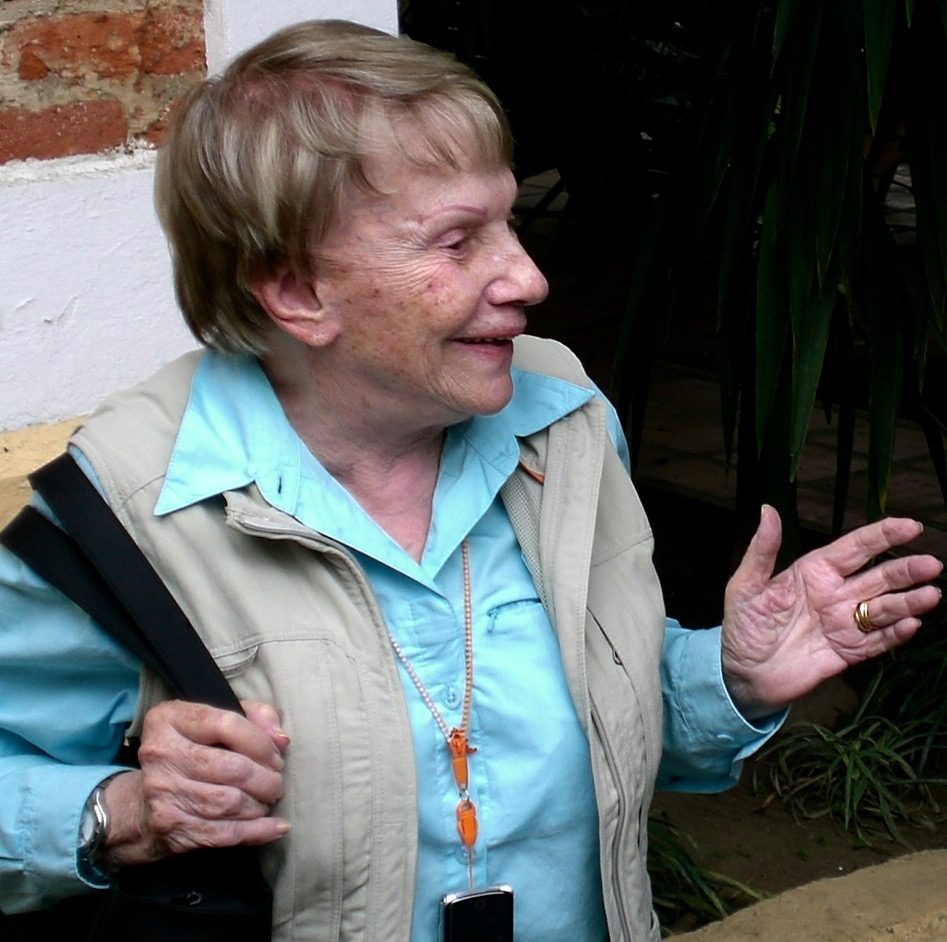
- Sofía Ímber, 2008
- Born: 8 May 1924; Soroca, Kingdom of Romania
- Died: 20 February 2017 (aged 92); Caracas, Venezuela
- Education: University of the Andes
- Occupations: Journalist, activist
- Spouse(s): Guillermo Meneses (1911-1978); Carlos Rangel (1929-1988)
- Children: Sara Meneses, Adrianna Meneses, Daniela Meneses, Pedro Meneses

Sofía Ímber (8 May 1924 – 20 February 2017) was a Romanian-born Venezuelan journalist and supporter of the arts. She was the founder of the Caracas Museum of Contemporary Art.

== Early life ==
She was born in Soroca, Kingdom of Romania (present-day Moldova) in 1924 to Jewish parents Naum Ímber and Ana Barú. She moved to Venezuela with her family when she was four years old, in 1928. Imber married Venezuelan journalist and diplomat Guillermo Meneses.

Her sister was Lya Imber, the first woman to receive a medical degree in Venezuela. Imber has three daughters Sara, Adriana, Daniela Meneses Imber and a son, Pedro Guillermo, who died in 2014.

== Career ==
During the 1940s, Imber attended the Universidad de los Andes, studying medicine for three years, after which she returned to Caracas. In Caracas she published articles in several papers and Venezuelan magazines, as well as in Mexico, Colombia and Argentina.

Imber married writer Guillermo Meneses in 1944, subsequently giving birth to Sara, Adriana, Daniela and Pedro Guillermo. As a member of Marcos Pérez Jiménez's diplomatic corps, both travelled to Europe. While stationed in Paris and Brussels, the couple made acquaintances with leftist intellectuals and Venezuelan expatriate artists grouped as "the dissidents", which included figures such as Alejandro Otero. Upon returning to Venezuela, she filed for divorce and married liberal thinker Carlos Rangel.

She created the TV political talk show titled Buenos días, airing on Venevisión. She produced and conducted Sólo con Sofía and La Venezuela Posible, a radio show. She held positions within El Nacional, El Universal, Últimas Noticias and Diario 2001. She published a collection of her articles in 1971, titled Yo la intransigente (I, the Intransigent One).

=== MACCSI ===
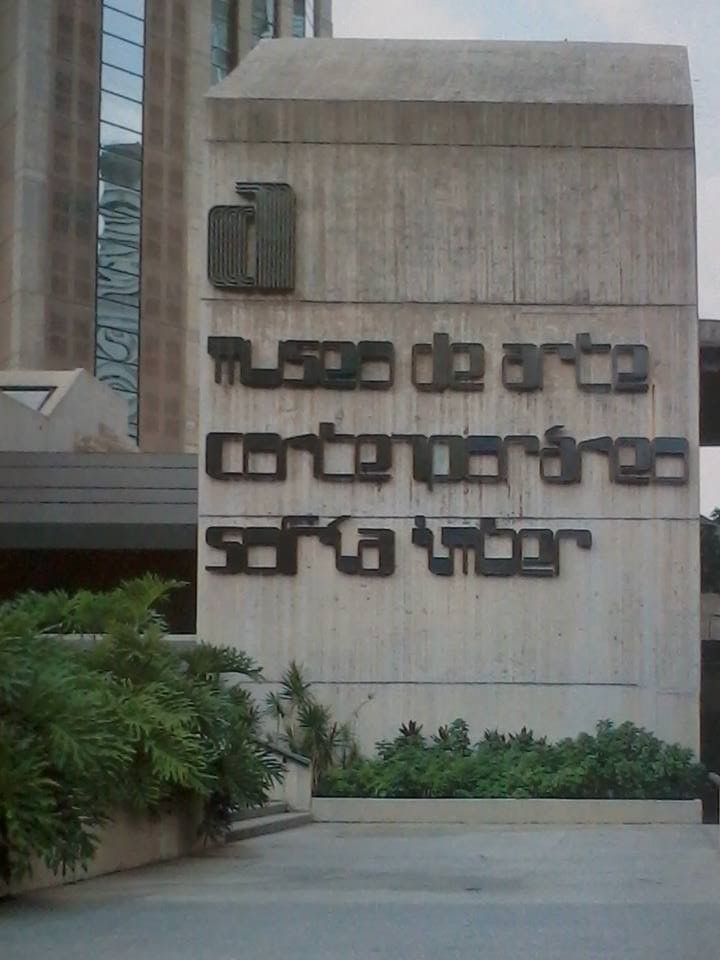
Museum entrance bearing her name

Imber founded the Contemporary Art Museum of Caracas in 1973, which possesses about four thousand pieces, the largest contemporary art collection in Latin America.

Imber headed the museum for almost thirty years until her dismissal by Hugo Chávez during one of his Aló Presidente programs. Fernando Botero was known to send protest letters to the president. Several pieces have since been reported as missing, including Odalisque with Red Pants by Henri Matisse, some of which were rumoured to be held by government officials in their private residences. The missing Matisse was replaced by a copy in its original frame.

Gallery owner Genaro Ambrosino noticed the forgery and made inquiries in Miami. FBI undercover agents recovered the stolen painting on July 17, 2012 from a hotel room. According to Marianela Balbi's account, the work disappeared during a time of "institutional instability".

== Awards ==
Imber was the only female recipient of the Premio Nacional de Periodismo de Venezuela (National Journalism Prize of Venezuela). She also received the Premio Nacional de Artes Plásticas de Venezuela for her work in advancing the creative process in Venezuela.

Imber received the Order of the Liberator General San Martín and the Picasso Medal by the Unesco, becoming the first Latin American to have been so honored. She was also decorated with, among others, the Legion of Honour (chevalier); the Order of the Aztec Eagle; Cruz de Boyacá; Order of Merit of the Italian Republic; Orden de Mayo (Argentina); Gabriela Mistral Order of Educational and Cultural Merit; Order of Rio Branco; Order of Civil Merit and the Order of Isabella the Catholic.

The Universidad Católica Andrés Bello named one of its research areas as "Sala de Investigación Sofía Imber y Carlos Rangel", as well as naming its journalism faculty after her. Arlette Machado published Mil Sofía in 2012, an edited book interview.

Ímber donated her personal book collection to the Universidad Católica Andrés Bello in June 2014. It contains approximately fourteen thousand entries.

In 2014, the Venezuelan American Endowment for the Arts (VAEA) awarded Imber the Paez Medal of Art 2014 for her work as an advocate for art throughout Latin America.
