= Marx and the Real Socialisms and other Essays =

Collection of essays by Carlos Rangel

Marx and the Real Socialisms and Other Essays
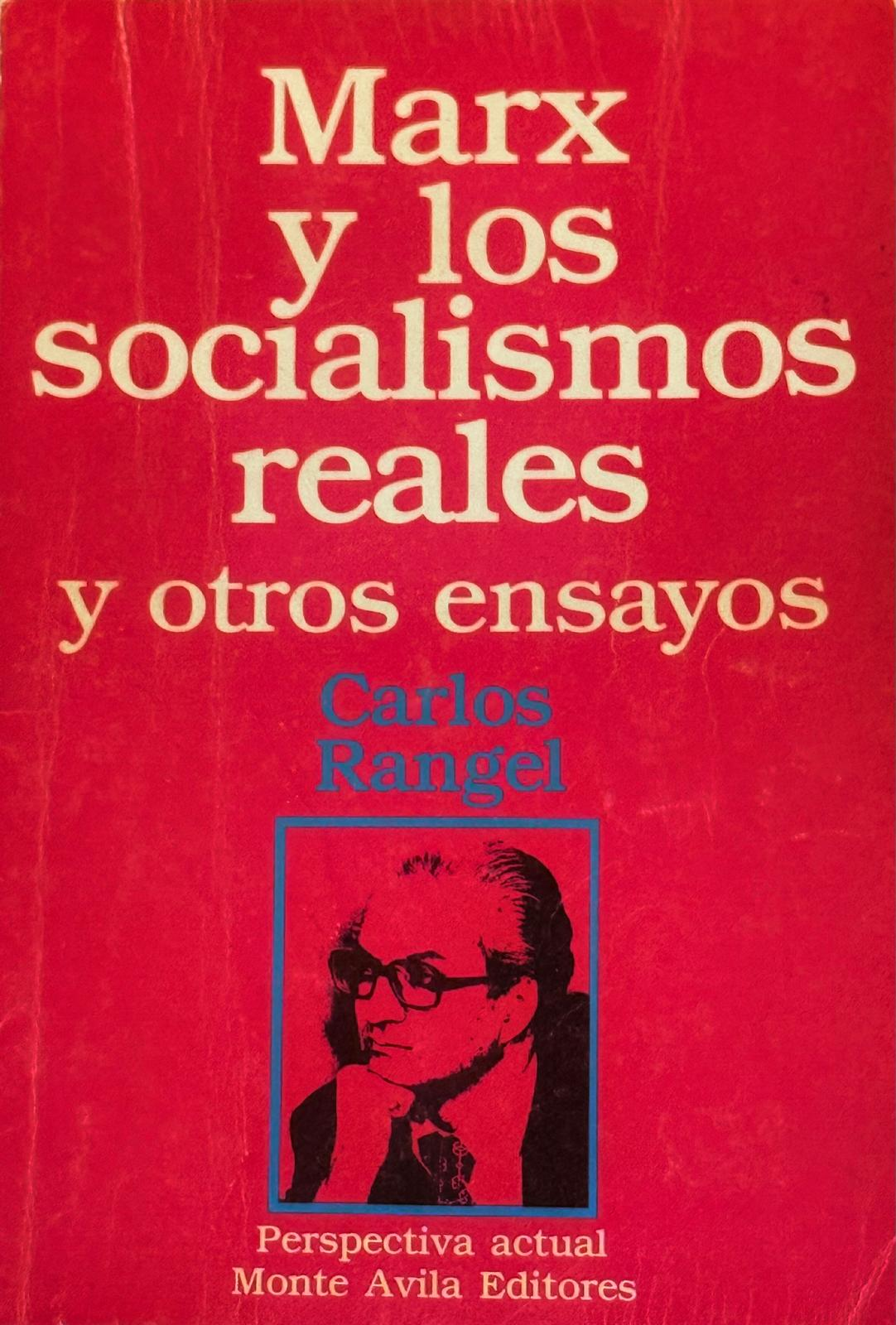
- Cover of the 1988 first edition
- Author: Carlos Rangel
- Publication date: 1988
- Publication place: Venezuela
- Pages: 290
- Preceded by: El tercermundismo (Third World Ideology and Western Reality: Manufacturing Political Myth)

Marx and the Real Socialisms and other Essays (Spanish: Marx y los socialismos reales y otros ensayos) is a collection of thirty-two essays by the Venezuelan writer and TV personality Carlos Rangel, published posthumously in 1988 by Monte Ávila Editores. The texts—original articles, newspaper columns, and public lectures written between 1975 and 1984—cover topics such as Marxist ideology, Cuban dissidence, Latin-American dependency debates, and Venezuelan politics. Critics have described the volume as the final part of an informal trilogy that also includes Del buen salvaje al buen revolucionario (1976) and El tercermundismo (1982).—on truth, individual responsibility, and the enduring threat of ideological dogma. Mario Vargas Llosa said about this book: "From his three books, I prefer the last one. The preface [Rangel] wrote for an edition of [Marx and Engels'] The Communist Manifesto, edited in 1980 by Ateneo de Caracas, is a small masterpiece". As of 2025, this book has not been translated into any other language.

== Synopsis ==
Marx y los socialismos reales y otros ensayos contains thirty-two essays.

In the first three essays, Rangel presents Marxism as a secular belief system rather than a science. This section includes one of the original essays for the book "Marx y Bolivar," used to document Marx's contempt for Simón Bolívar, the Latin American revolutionary, branded by Marx as a despicable power-hungry coward that history (in 1858) was pretending to label as a Latin American Napoleon. The next essay, "Marx y la literatura infantil" recounts the story of Pavlik Morozov, who in 1932 accused his father to the Stalin police for illegally collecting wheat. After his father was sent to Siberia, Pavlik was murdered by his uncle. The uncle was executed by firing squad, and Pavlik was exalted by the regime's children's literature as a hero in tales, ballads and operas to encourage Soviet Bloc children to also inform on their parents.

Essays four through nine profile Cuban dissident voices including Heberto Padilla, Reinaldo Arenas, and Guillermo Cabrera Infante, illustrating the personal cost of ideological conformity and the human cost of "real socialism" as exemplified by Cuba.

In essays ten through fourteen, Rangel critiques Latin-American foreign policy and victimhood narratives, particularly focusing on rhetorical duplicity. In the book's second original essay, "El tercermundismo," Rangel recaps his second book ''Third World Ideology'', in which he analyzes the notion that underdevelopment is caused solely by an imperialist zero-sum game, arguing instead that internal failures and authoritarian seductions are central obstacles to progress. Rangel also calls out nations and leaders for their duplicity when turning a blind eye on leftist authoritarianism while preaching human rights.

Essays fifteen through nineteen republish a series of speeches and essays about Venezuela's political decline, He confronts populism, rent-seeking behaviors, and the weakening of democratic institutions. His speeches at IESA, and elsewhere, lay out a vision for a "new country" grounded on liberal reform and civic responsibility.

In essays twenty through thirty, Rangel discusses the personal accountability of intellectuals in the face of authoritarian dogma. He critiques Jean-Paul Sartre, contrasted with Albert Camus, Thomas Mann, and others who, in Rangel's view, represent divergent responses to the collision between truth and dogma. Through these portraits he argues that genuine creativity and conscience require ethical and moral standing apart from both revolutionary and reactionary orthodoxies.

The final two essays provide literary meditations on Marcel Proust and Miguel de Unamuno that find freedom in personal memory and ethical self-examination. Rangel argues that art and solitude are acts of resistance—that the defense of truth often begins in personal memory, the experience of time, and introspection. He closes the book with a quote from Unamuno: "It is by listening to our essential being that we can hear the voice of all men [he quotes Unamuno]: Since I cannot hear the truth from one man when he speaks to another man, nor can I hear it when he speaks to me, I go to solitude, I take refuge in it, and there, alone, listening to my heart, I hear everyone speak the truth." (Unamuno, M. "Soledad," 1905).

== Place in Rangel's trilogy ==
Whereas Del buen salvaje al buen revolucionario critiques the "noble-savage" ideal and its pernicious legacy in Latin America, and El tercermundismo challenges dependency theory at a global level of hegemonic rivalries, the 1988 volume synthesizes both arguments and extends them to personal level questions of art, psychology, and moral courage. Enrique Krauze and other scholars view Marx y los socialismos reales y otros ensayos as completing Rangel's trilogy on Latin-American political myths. Mario Vargas Llosa describes the book—and particularly its introductory essay—as "a small masterpiece" of liberal polemic. While the first book centered on a region and the countries within it, and the second one takes the broader analytical view of the conflict between ideological hegemonic powers, this third book lands its thematic arc on the interaction of individuals within the ideology and historical context that surrounds them. As Jean-François Revel indicates in his prologue, the overarching thesis of Marx y los socialismos reales y otros ensayos asserts that political liberty ultimately rests on intellectual honesty and personal responsibility—qualities exemplified by Camus, Mann, Paz, and Unamuno, and betrayed by Sartre and other ideological partisans.

== Reception ==
Commentator Álvaro Vargas Llosa has cited these essays as an "indispensable liberal reading" of Venezuelan politics. Osorio Bohórquez also dedicates a portion of his paper on Carlos Rangel and his critique on Marxism to these essays as a significant section of the book.

In 2019, when presenting the book “La inconstitucional actividad empresarial del Estado en Venezuela,” Dr. Henrique Irribaren Monteverde (a member of the National Academy of Economic and Social Sciences of Venezuela) made extensive reference to “Marx and the Real Socialism and Other Essays.” Describing Rangel as “one of the most prestigious exponents of liberal thought in Latin America” he used the book's essay Socialismo y libre empresa as a source in discussing perspectives on the role of the state in economic enterprise.

== Editions ==
- 1988 – Caracas, Venezuela (Spanish, print), Marx y los socilsimos reales y otros ensayos, Monte Ávila Editores, 290 pp. ISBN 980-01-0250-7 (1988)
- 2021 – Caracas, Venezuela (Spanish, digital), CEDICE Libertad, Marx y los socilsimos reales y otros ensayos (part of Biblioteca Carlos Rangel series). ISBN 980-01-0250-7 (2021)

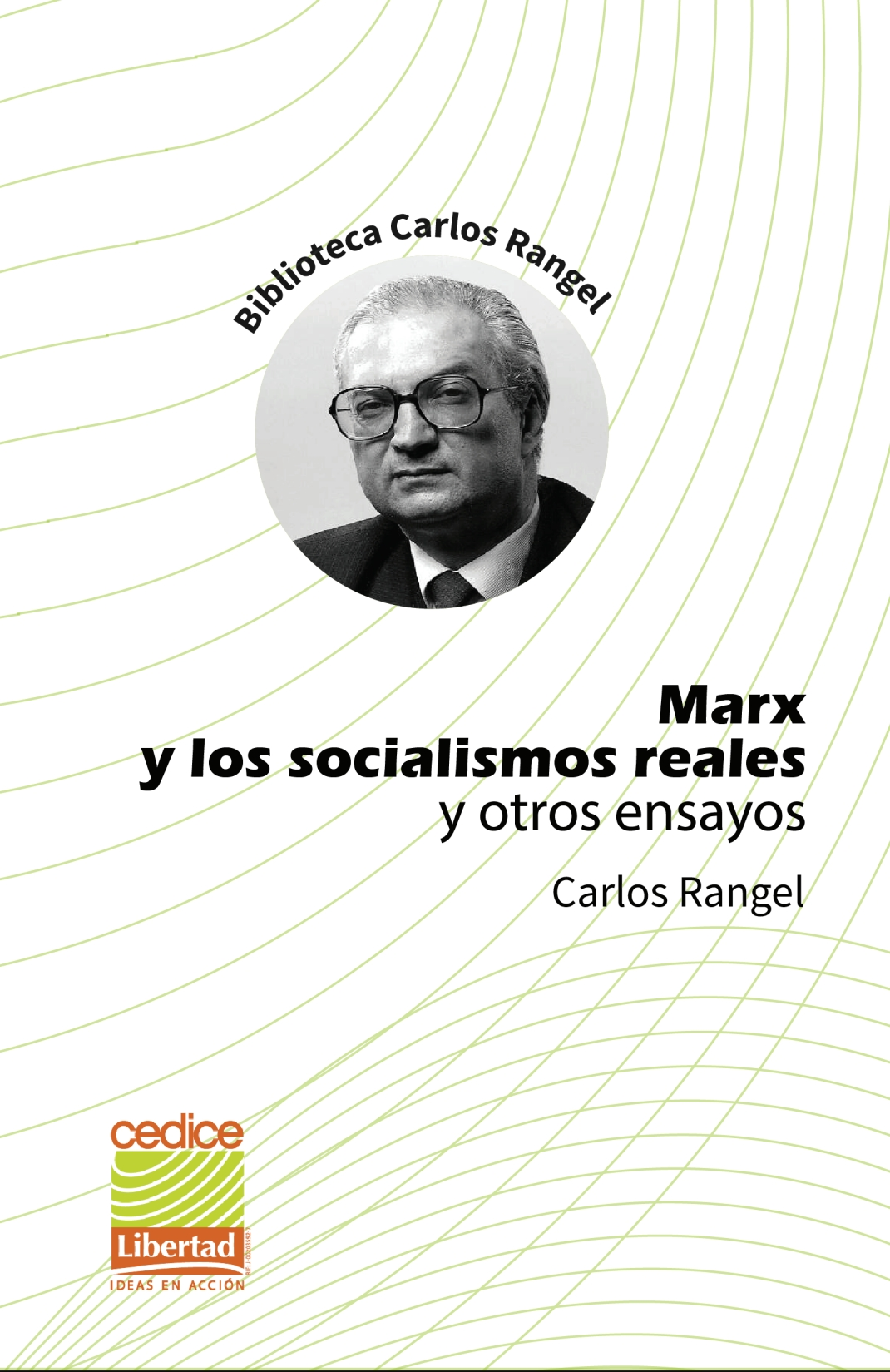
Carlos Rangel - Marx y los socialismos reales y otros ensayos
