= Monte Ávila Editores =

Monte Ávila Editores Latinoamericana CA
- Company type: State-owned company
- Industry: Publishing
- Founded: 8 April 1968
- Headquarters: Caracas, Venezuela
- Area served: Venezuela
- Products: Books
- Website: monteavila.gob.ve

Monte Ávila Editores is the largest and most important publishing house in Venezuela. Between 1980 and 2000 it published over 300 titles, largely by Venezuelan authors, producing over 1.2m copies.

Founded in 1968 on the initiative of author Simón Alberto Consalvi, as of 2009 it has published over 2000 books. Past Directors include Juan Liscano, Rafael Arráiz Lucca.
