= Guillermo Meneses =

Venezuelan writer

- Born: 15 December 1911; Caracas, Venezuela
- Died: 28 December 1978 (aged 67); Porlamar, Nueva Esparta

Signature
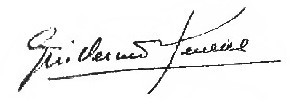

Guillermo Meneses (Caracas, 15 December 1911 - Porlamar, Nueva Esparta, 29 December 1978) was a Venezuelan writer, playwright, and journalist. He was the author of La Balandra 'Isabel' llegó esta tarde and Campeones, among other works. His awards and honors include the Venezuelan National Prize for Literature (1967), the "Order of the city of Caracas", and the "Andrés Bello Order" created by President Rafael Caldera.

== Bibliography ==
- La Balandra Isabel llegó esta tarde (Caracas, 1934)
- Canción de Negros (Caracas, 1934)
- La Nación (Caracas, 1934)
- Tres cuentos Venezolanos (Caracas, 1938)
- El Mestizo José Vargas (Caracas, 1942)
- La Mujer, el As de Oro y La Luna (Caracas, 1948)
- La Mano Junto al Muro (París, 1952)
- Antología del Cuento Venezolano (Caracas, 1955)
- Venezuela (Paris, 1956)
- Hoy en Casa Leyendo (Caracas, 1960)
- Cuento de Venezuela (Caracas, 1960)
- Cable Cifrado (Caracas, 1961)
- Discurso de Orden (Caracas, 1965)
- El Duque (Caracas, 1965, 1970)
- Espejos y Disfraces (Caracas,1967)
- Libro de Caracas (Caracas, 1967)
- Los Muros de Venezuela (Caracas, 1967)
- Diez Cuentos (Caracas, 1968)
- Cinco Novelas (Caracas, 1972)

== See also ==
- Venezuela
- Venezuelan literature
- List of Venezuelan writers
