= List of Corsican people =

This is an incomplete list of notable people from Corsica or of Corsican descent.

== Musicians ==
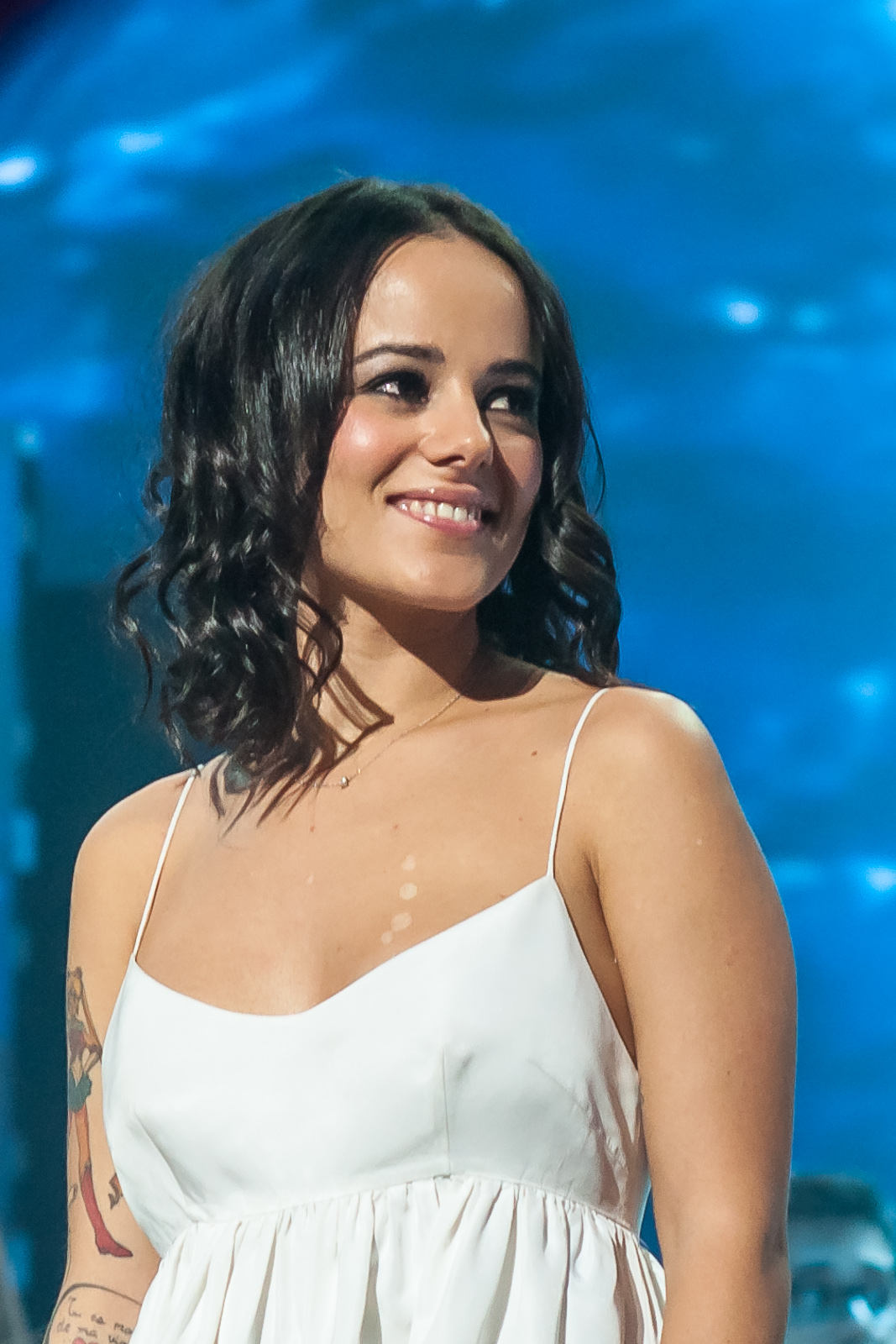
Alizée

- Alizée (born 1984), singer
- Patrick Fiori (born 1969), singer
- Michel Giacometti (1929-1990), ethnomusicologist who worked primarily in Portugal
- Jenifer (born 1982), French singer of Corsican ancestry
- Henry Padovani (born 1952), guitarist and singer, founder member of The Police
- Eddie Palmieri (1936-2025), Puerto Rican pianist and composer of Corsican ancestry
- Antonio Paoli (1871-1946), Puerto Rican opera singer of Corsican ancestry
- Tino Rossi (1907-1983), singer and actor
- César Vezzani (1888-1951), opera singer

== Politicians and leaders ==
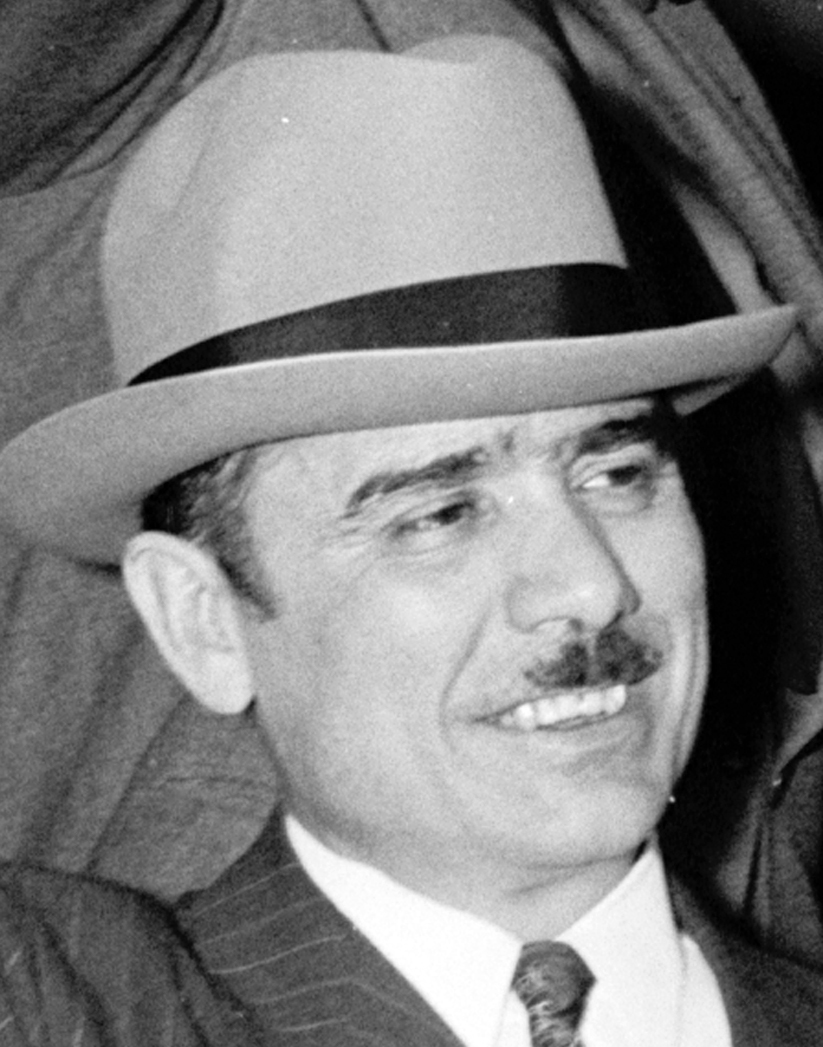
John Bernard

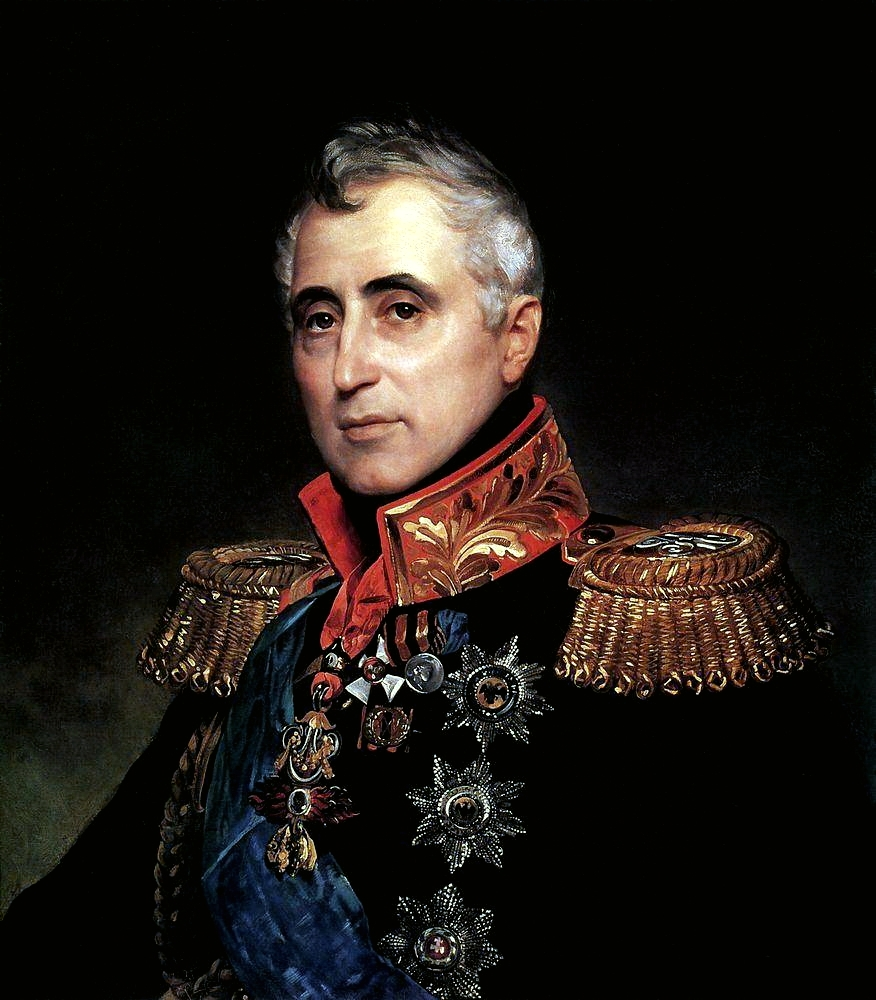
Carlo Andrea Pozzo di Borgo

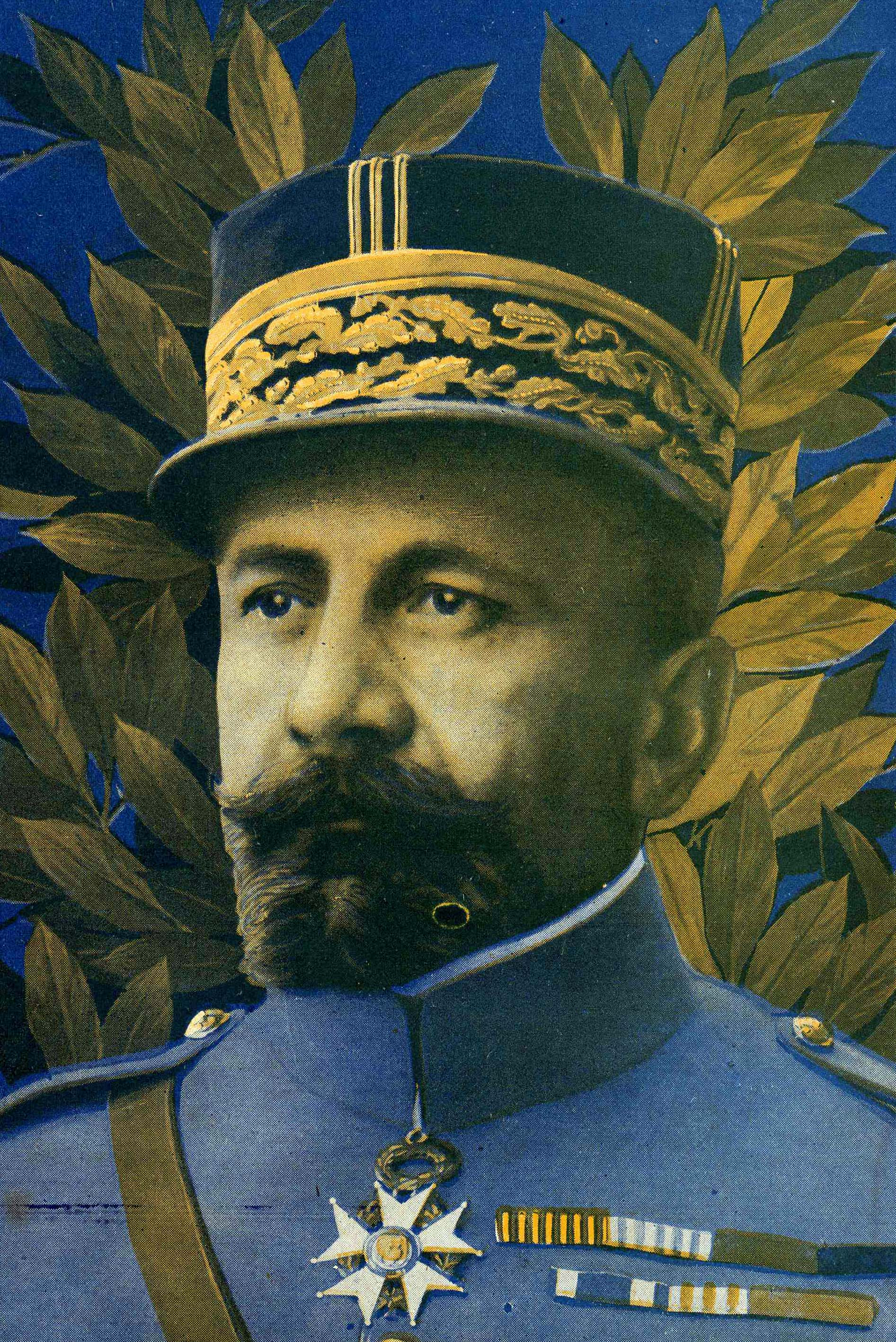
Jean César Graziani

- Germaine Ahidjo (1932-2021), former First Lady of Cameroon 1960–1982, (father of Corsican ancestry)
- Sambucuccio d'Alando (14th century), revolutionary
- Diego Arria Saliceti (born 1938), Venezuelan economist, diplomat and politician of Corsican ancestry
- John Bernard (1893-1983), Corsican-born American Congressman
- Hammuda Bey (died 1666), Bey of Tunis (Corsican parents, Murad I Bey and Yasmine)
- Murad I Bey (born Jacques Senti, died 1631), Bey of Tunis
- Mariana Bracetti, Puerto Rican independentist of Corsican ancestry
- Aristides Calvani (1918-1986), Venezuelan politician and lawyer of Corsican ancestry
- César Campinchi (1882-1941), politician and lawyer
- Arthur Andrew Cipriani (1875–1945), labour leader and politician of Trinidad and Tobago
- Aníbal Dominici (1837-1897), Venezuelan politician and lawyer of Corsican ancestry
- César Campinchi (1882-1941), politician and lawyer
- Arthur Andrew Cipriani (1875-1945), Trinidadian politician of Corsican ancestry
- Giovanni Corso (died 1685), pirate and privateer
- Hasan Corso (born Pietro Paolo Tavera, died 1556), caliph and mayor of Algiers
- Pasquino Corso (died 1532), military leader
- Sampiero Corso (1498-1567), military leader
- Juan Pablo Fernandini (1793-1842), Peruvian military leader of Corsican ancestry
- François Gaffori (1744-1796), politician and military leader
- Petru Giovacchini (1910-1955), fascist and pro-Italian collaborator in World War II
- Jean César Graziani (1859–1932), Corsican French Army general who served in World War I
- Arturo Hernandez Grisanti (1928-2008), Venezuelan writer politician of Corsican ancestry
- Raul Leoni (1905-1972), president of Venezuela 1964-1969, of Corsican ancestry
- Jaime Lusinchi (1924-2014), president of Venezuela 1984-1989, of Corsican ancestry
- Norodom Monineath (born Paule Monique Izzi, 1936), former queen consort of Cambodia (father of Corsican descent)
- Ángel Navarro (1748-1808), early Texas settler and mayor of San Antonio
- José Antonio Navarro (1795-1871), Texan politician of Corsican ancestry
- Alain Orsoni (born 1954), former guerrilla leader of the FLNC-Canal Habituel and former president of AC Ajaccio
- François-Xavier Ortoli (1925-2007), politician, former President of the European Commission
- Pasquale Paoli (1725-1807), Corsican patriot, statesman and military leader
- Charles Pasqua (1927-2015), French politician of Corsican ancestry
- Alicia Pietri (1923-2011), public figure of Corsican ancestry who twice served as First Lady of Venezuela (1969–1974 and 1994–1999)
- Juan Pietri, Venezuelan militar of Corsican ancestry
- Luis Geronimo Pietri, Venezuelan lawyer and politician of Corsican ancestry
- Luis Rafael Pimentel Agostini (1891 - 1959), Venezuelan militar of Corsican ancestry
- Carlo Andrea Pozzo di Borgo (1764-1842), French politician and Russian diplomat
- Antoine Christophe Saliceti (1757-1809), politician, member of the National Convention during the French Revolution
- François Santoni (1960-2001), guerrilla leader and co-leader of the FLNC-Canal Historique
- Norodom Sihamoni (born 1953), King of Cambodia and son of Norodom Monineath
- Leopoldo Sucre Figarella (1926-1996), Venezuelan politician of Corsican ancestry
- José Antonio Velutini (1844-1912), Venezuelan military of Corsican ancestry

=== Bonaparte family ===
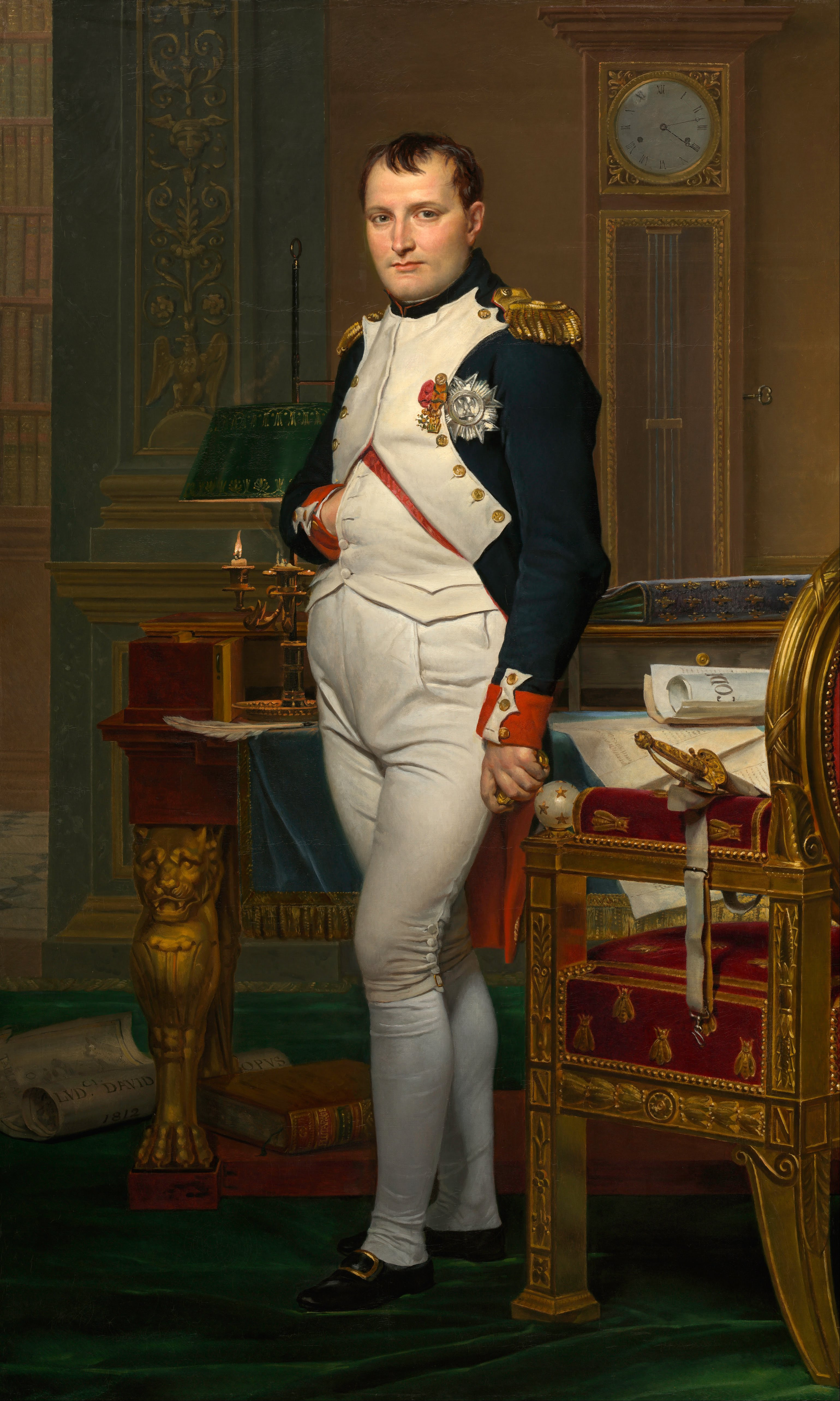
Napoléon Bonaparte

- Napoléon Bonaparte (1769-1821), Emperor of France
- Carlo Bonaparte (1746-1785), father of Napoléon Bonaparte
- Caroline Bonaparte (1782-1839), sister of Napoléon Bonaparte
- Elisa Bonaparte (1777-1820), sister of Napoléon Bonaparte
- Jérôme Bonaparte (1784-1860), brother of Napoléon Bonaparte
- Joseph Bonaparte (1768-1844), brother of Napoléon Bonaparte
- Louis Bonaparte (1778-1846), brother of Napoléon Bonaparte
- Lucien Bonaparte (1775-1840), brother of Napoléon Bonaparte
- Pauline Bonaparte (1780-1825), sister of Napoléon Bonaparte
- Joseph Fesch (1763-1839), half-uncle of Napoléon Bonaparte
- Letizia Ramolino (1749-1836), mother of Napoléon Bonaparte

== Scientists ==
- Angelo Mariani (1838-1914), chemist
- Pedro Penzini Fleury – Venezuelan pharmacist of Corsican ancestry
- Andrés Antonio Pietri (1889-1956), physician
- Cédric Villani (born 1973), French mathematician of Corsican ancestry
- Paul Vincensini (1896-1978), mathematician

== Sportspeople ==
=== Fencing ===
- Xavier Anchetti (born 1866, date of death unknown), Corsican-born French Olympic fencer
- Michel Sebastiani (born 1937), French modern pentathlete and Olympic fencing coach

=== Football ===
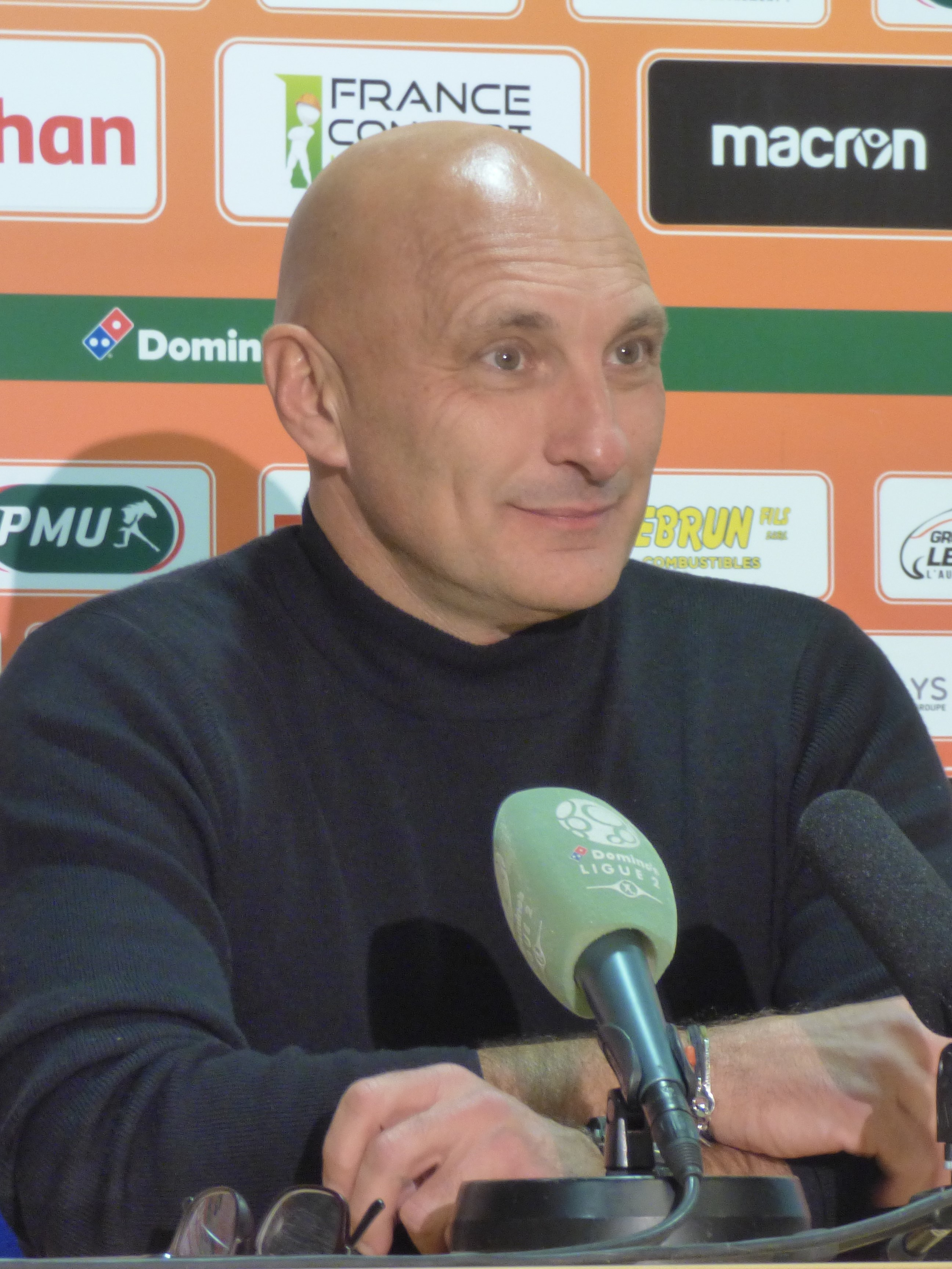
Olivier Pantaloni

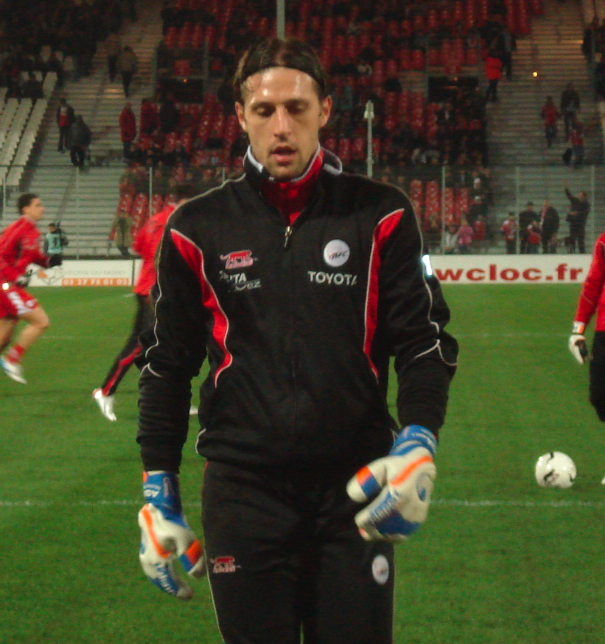
Nicolas Penneteau

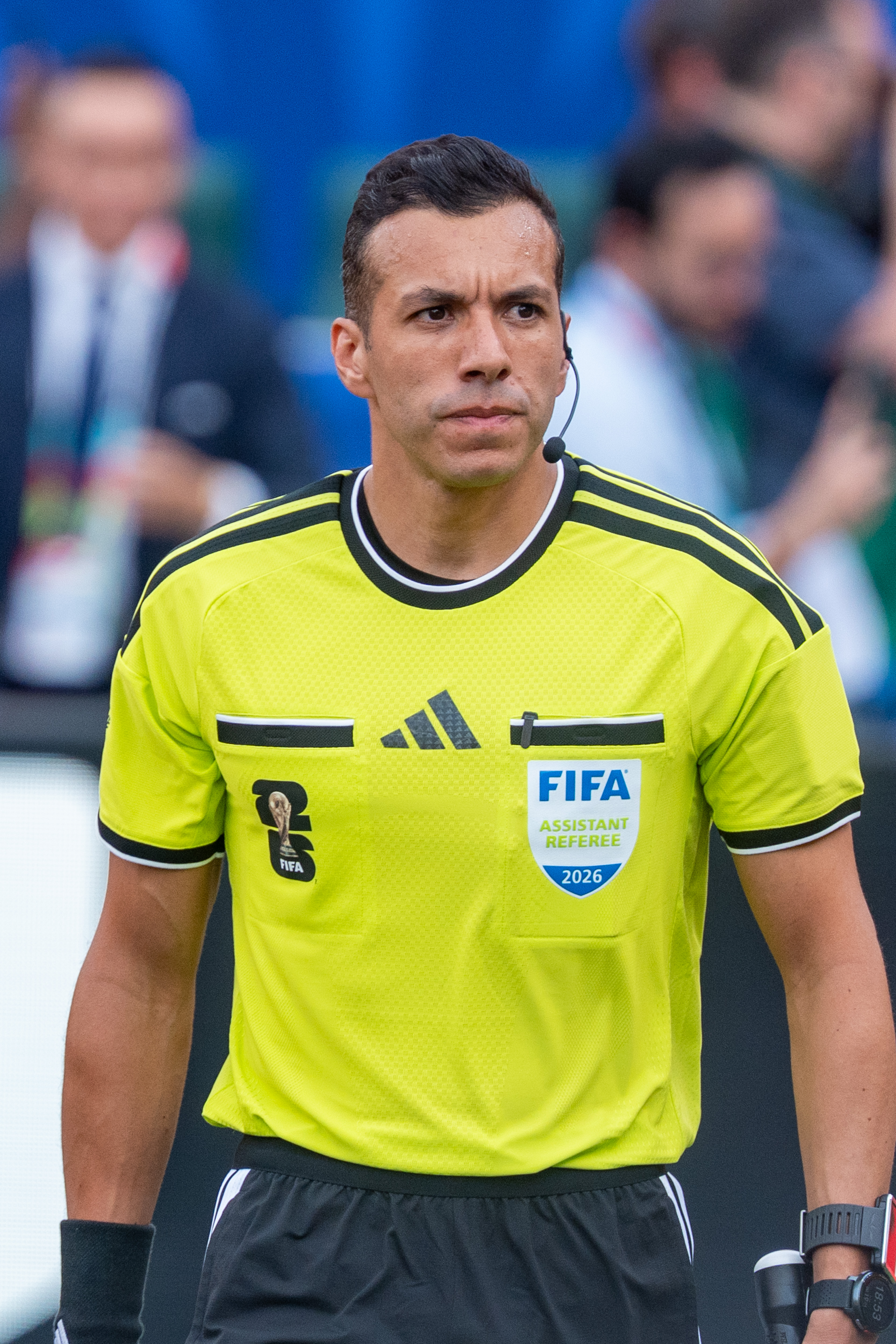
Mehdi Rahmouni

- Chahir Belghazouani (born 1986), former Moroccan international
- Chaouki Ben Saada (born 1984), Tunisian international
- Rémy Cabella (born 1990), French international
- Yanis Cimignani (born 2002)
- Dominique Colonna (born 1928), French former international
- Adama Diakhaby (born 1996), current player
- Wahbi Khazri (born 1991), Tunisian international
- François Modesto (born 1978), former player
- Pascal Olmeta (born 1961), former player
- Olivier Pantaloni, (born 1966), former player
- Charles Orlanducci (born 1951), French former international
- Julian Palmieri (born 1986), former player
- Claude Papi (1949-1983), French former international
- Nicolas Penneteau (born 1981), French player
- Mehdi Rahmouni (born 1988), French football referee
- Adil Rami (born 1985), French international, 2018 World Cup winner
- Jean-Jacques Rocchi (born 1989), French international
- Benjamin Santelli (born 1991), French international
- Albert Vanucci (born 1947), French former international

=== Track & field ===
- Cécile Lignot-Maubert (née Lignot; born 1971), Corsican-born hammer thrower
- Salim Sdiri (born 1978), long jumper

=== Other ===
- Maxime Chevalier (born 1999), cyclist
- Laurent Lokoli (born 1994), tennis player
- Robertino Pietri (born 1974), Venezuelan professional motorcycle racer

== Writers ==
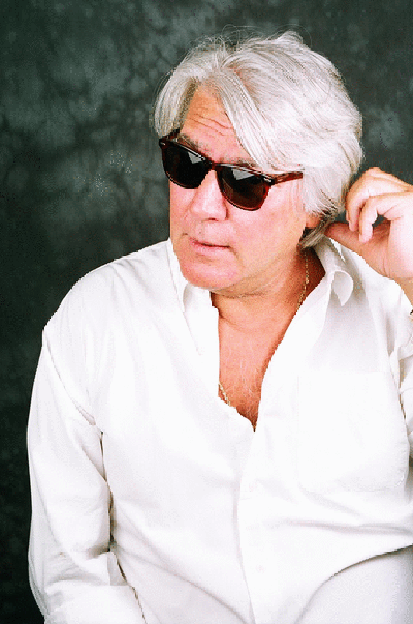
Michel Ferracci-Porri

- Marc Biancarelli (born 1968), writer
- Pedro César Dominici (1873–1954), Venezuelan writer, playwright and diplomat of Corsican ancestry
- Michel Ferracci-Porri (born 1949), writer
- Hernán Garrido Lecca (born 1960, Peruvian economist, writer of Corsican ancestry
- Juan Liscano (1915-2001), Venezuelan poet, writer, folklorist, editor of Corsican ancestry
- Francisco Massiani (1944-2019), Venezuelan writer of Corsican ancestry
- Francisco Pimentel Agostini, Venezuelan writer of Corsican ancestry
- José Rafael Pocaterra, Venezuelan writer, ambassador, politician, and lawyer of Corsican ancestry
- Arturo Uslar Pietri (1906-2001), Venezuelan writer and politician of Corsican ancestry
- Bartolomé Tavera Acosta (1865-1931), Venezuelan historian, ethnologist, linguist and journalist of Corsican ancestry
- Elisabeth Vincentelli, New York-based arts and culture journalist

== Fashion ==
- Sonia Ben Ammar (born 1999), model, singer, and actress
- Sully Bonnelly (born 1956), Dominican-American fashion designer
- Laetitia Casta (born 1978), French model and actress of Corsican ancestry
- Eva Colas (born 1996), Corsican-born French model; Miss Corsica 2017 and Miss Universe France 2018
- Garance Doré (born 1975), fashion blogger
- Baptiste Giabiconi (born 1989), French model and singer of Corsican ancestry

== Gangsters ==
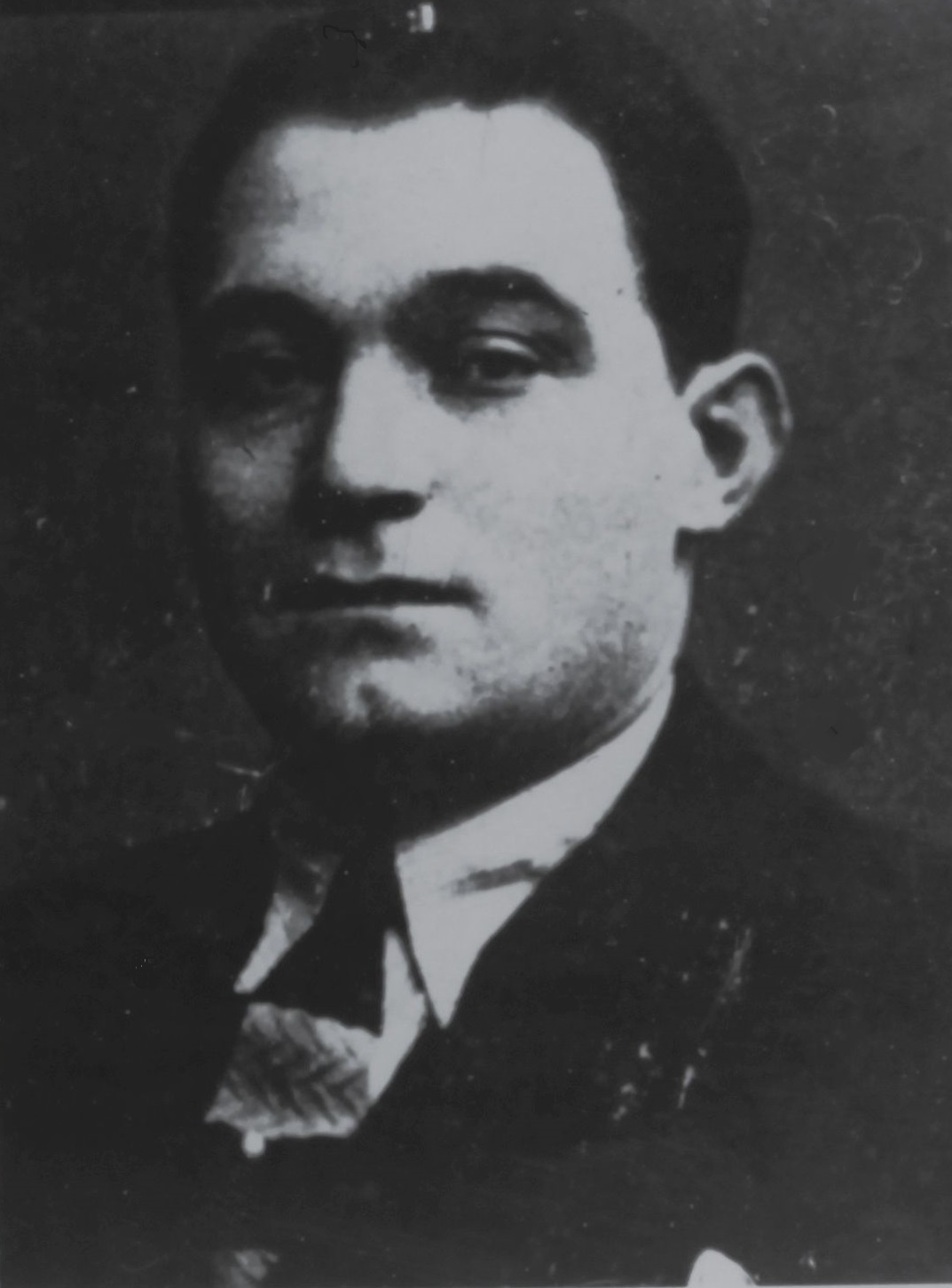
Paul Carbone

- Paul Carbone
- Marcel Francisci
- José Giovanni
- Jean-Pierre Hernandez
- François Marcantoni
- Paul Mondoloni
- Auguste Ricord
- Lucien Sarti
- François Spirito
- Jacques Voignier

== Miscellaneous ==
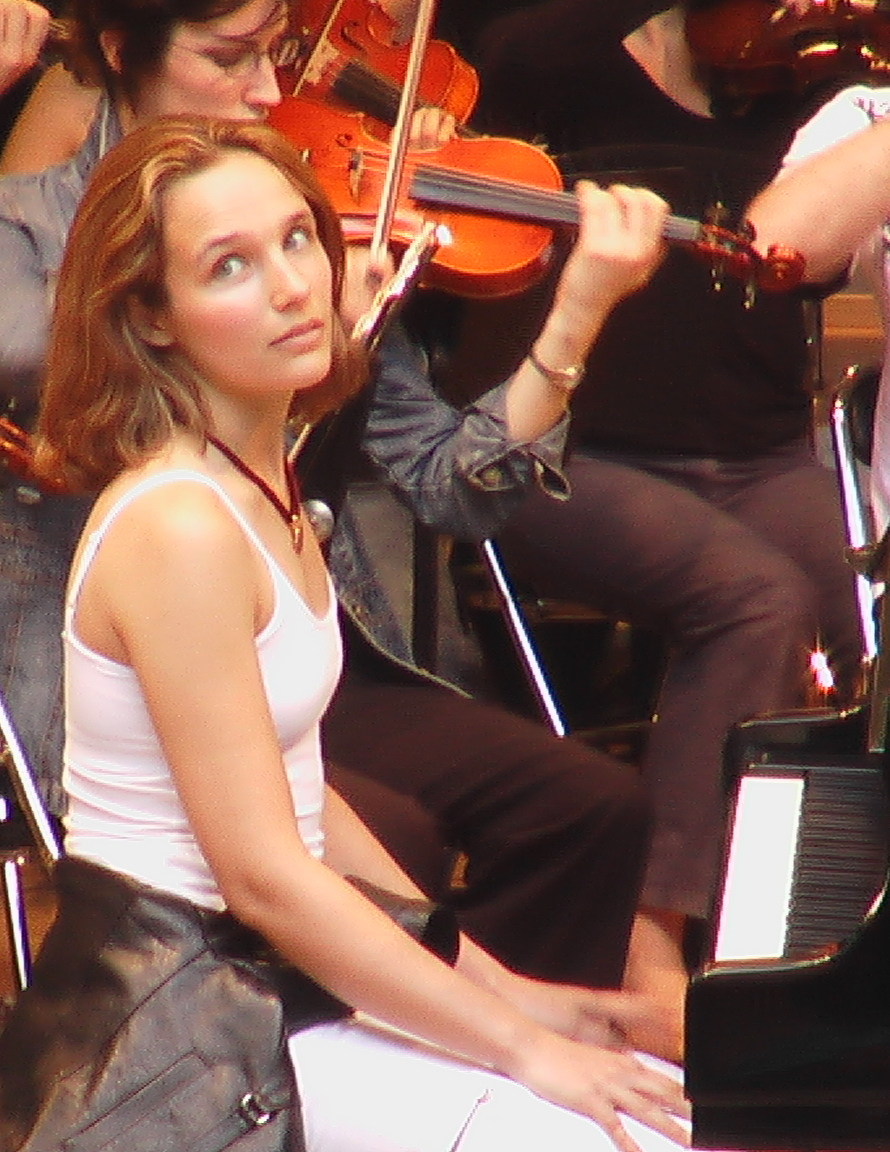
Hélène Grimaud

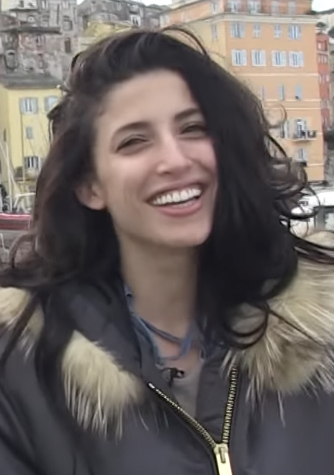
Tania Raymonde

- Gaston Acurio (born 1967), Peruvian gastronomist and writer of Corsican ancestry
- Thomas Ceccaldi Hollis (born 1997), World record holder for most continuous cracking of different joints
- Theodor W. Adorno (born Theodor Ludwig Wiesengrund; 1903–1969), German philosopher, musicologist, and social theorist; Corsican mother
- Christian Boltanski (1944–2021), French sculptor, photographer, painter, and filmmaker, Corsican mother
- Jean Cagninacci, gold miner entrepreneur of El Callao
- Danielle Casanova (1909-1943), World War II Resistance heroine
- Vincent de Moro-Giafferi (1878-1956), French lawyer and politician of Corsican ancestry
- Anita Fernandini de Naranjo (1902-1982), Peruvian heiress and politician of Corsican ancestry
- Leon Santelli Gelormini (1844-1925), Venezuelan rum master of Corsican ancestry
- Eduardo Georgetti (1866-1937), agriculturist, businessman, philanthropist, politician and sugar baron
- Hélène Grimaud (born 1969), French classical pianist of Corsican ancestry
- Antonio Liccioni, gold miner entrepreneur of El Callao
- Marie-Claude Pietragalla (born 1963), French dancer and choreographer of Corsican ancestry
- Tania Raymonde (born 1988), American actress, Corsican mother
- Alberto Roncagliolo, engineer
- Benito Roncagliolo, engineer
- Espartaco Santoni (1937-1998), Venezuelan actor of Corsican ancestry
- Bartolomé Tavera Acosta (1865-1931), Venezuelan historian, ethnologist, linguist and journalist of Corsican ancestry
- Luis Emilio Velutini (born 1953), Venezuelan businessman of Corsican ancestry

== See also ==
- List of Sardinians
- Lists of people by nationality
