= Corsican diaspora in Venezuela =

Corsicans, coming mainly from the regions of Cap Corse and La Castagniccia in the mediterranean island of Corsica, started arriving in the first third of the 19th century and settled mainly in the coastal towns of Carúpano and Rio Caribe. Known locally as Los Corsos, Corsicans played a central role in the development of the cocoa and rum industry in Venezuela. Around the 1950s many Corsican families left Paria and settled in Caracas, and have been active in politics, commerce, medicine and the arts.

== Historical background ==
The first Corsicans to settle in Venezuela were sailors and missionaries, who moved from the island when was part of the Italian Republic of Genoa, in the sixteenth and seventeenth centuries.

During the reign of Napoleon III Corsica suffered a decline in agricultural production (particularly in the wine, olive and chestnut industries) due to unfair trade practices imposed by France. That coupled with a population boom due to the eradication of malaria in coastal areas, forced many Corsican families to emigrate to the Caribbean.

The first wave of Corsicans arrived in the Venezuelan region of Paria around 1830. Antonio Oletta, Francisco and Cayetano Morandi, José Vicente Franceschi and Juan Bautista Lucca were some of the first Corsicans to settle in the town of Carúpano. Once in Paria, many Corsicans founded cocoa exporting firms, most notable being that of the Franceschi & Co, established in 1830 and still existing today, making it one of Venezuela's oldest companies.

There were two other significant waves of immigration at the end of the 19th century. While most of them went to Carúpano, where there was already a well established Corsican-Venezuelan community, others settled in the towns of Barcelona and Ciudad Bolivar. The Corsos controlled the Venezuelan cocoa bean trade and modernized many of the towns where they lived.

By 1876, four Corsican companies were responsible for the export of 90% of the year's cocoa: Franceschi & Cia., Massiani & Cia., Lucca & Cia. and Raffalli Bros.

Nearly half a century later, in 1921, five companies—Franceschi & Cia., Prosperi & Cia. (founded 1890), Antoni Hermanos, Benedetti Hermanos (founded in 1889) and Raffalli Hermanos—still represented 80% of the export trade for cocoa from Carúpano.

The port facilities, road improvements and a telegraph cable that connected Carúpano with Marseille were some of the projects put forward by the Corsicans in Carúpano.

During the turbulent dictatorship of General Cipriano Castro (1899-1908), the value of agricultural production contracted by 52%, the year of the economic blockade of the great European powers due to default on foreign debt. In 1908, accusing the opposition to his regime, General Castro massively expelled Corsican producers and traders established in and around Carúpano.

== Notable Venezuelans of Corsican Descent ==
- Rafael Agostini Hospedales (1808-1881), writer and lawyer
- Olga Antonetti (1945-1968), model, Miss Venezuela 1962
- Diego Arria Salicetti (born 1938), economist, diplomat, polítician
- Aimée Battistini (1916-1989), painter
- Josefina Benedetti (born 1955), composer
- Ángel Biaggini (1899 - 1975), lawyer and politician
- Aristides Calvani (1918-1986), politician and lawyer
- Simón Alberto Consalvi – Politician
- Aníbal Dominici (1837-1897), politician and lawyer
- Pedro César Dominici (1873-1954), writer and diplomatic
- Santos Dominici (1869-1954), physician
- Alberto Franceschi (born 1949), politician and businessman
- Arturo Hernández Grisanti (1927 – 2008) – writer, politician
- Arturo Uslar Pietri (1906 – 2001) – writer, intellectual, political thinker, winner of the Prince of Asturias Award
- Raúl Leoni (1905 -1972) – President of Venezuela, 1964–1969
- Jaime Lusinchi (May 27, 1924 – May 21, 2014) – President of Venezuela, 1984–1989
- Juan Liscano (1915-2001), poet, writer, folklorist, editor
- Francisco Massiani (1944 - 2019), writer
- Ángel Santos Palazzi (1877 - 1916), militar
- Alberto Paoli Chalbaud (1912- 1987), militar
- Alejandro Pietri Pietri, arquitecto
- Alicia Pietri (1923 - 2011), public figure who twice served as First Lady of Venezuela (1969–1974 and 1994–1999)
- Juan Pietri Pietri (1849 - 1911), physician, politician, militar
- Luis Geronimo Pietri (1892 - 1969), politician, diplomat and lawyer
- Berenice Perrone (born 1936), singer and actress
- Carlos Prosperi Mannuit, politician
- Benjamin Rausseo (born 1962), politician and comedian
- Benito Roncagliolo, engineer
- Bartolomé Tavera Acosta (1865-1931) Historian, ethnologist, linguist and journalist
- Leon Santelli, rum Master
- Espartaco Santoni (1937-1998), actor
- Leopoldo Sucre Figarella (1926-1996), politician
- Fina Torres Benedetti, film maker
- José Antonio Velutini (1844-1912), militar
- Luis Emilio Velutini (born 1953), businessman

== See also ==
- Corsican people
- Corsican immigration to Puerto Rico
- History of Venezuela
- List of Corsicans
- Italian Venezuelans
