= Velutini =

Velutini is an Italian surname that may refer to the following notable people:

- José Antonio Velutini (1844–1912), Venezuelan statesman
- Julio Herrera Velutini (born 1971), international banker
- Luis Emilio Velutini (born 1953), Venezuelan businessman and investor
