= Thor Halvorssen =

Thor Halvorssen may refer to:

- Thor Halvorssen (businessman) (1943–2014), Venezuelan businessman, special commissioner for international narcotic affairs, with the rank of ambassador
- Thor Halvorssen (human rights activist) (born 1976), his son, film producer and founder of Human Rights Foundation
