= Uslar (disambiguation) =

Uslar is a town in Germany.

Uslar may also refer to:

== People ==
- José Herrera Uslar (born 1906), Venezuelan politician
- Peter von Uslar (1816–1875), Russian general
- Arturo Uslar Pietri (1906–2001), Venezuelan intellectual

== Other uses ==
- Uslar station, railway station in Germany
