= Murders of Reinaldo José Herrera and Fabrizio Mendoza =

Reinaldo José Herrera and Fabrizio Mendoza were kidnapped and murdered in Caracas, Venezuela, on 11 May 2017, by a criminal gang. Of the five members of the group named to police, three were charged with the kidnapping and murder. As of January 2018, one of these had been convicted at trial. The attack had been planned by a friend and business partner of Mendoza.

Though violent crime was common in Venezuela at the time, the attack drew particular interest due to its uncommon means; Herrera's notable family; and "mysterious", soon dismissed, allegations that Mendoza's assassination had been ordered from the United States.

== Attack ==
Reinaldo José Herrera Sánchez (age 34) and Fabrizio Alberto Mendoza Isea (age 31) were business partners in an architecture firm. They were kidnapped together on 11 May 2017 in the business complex of La Boyera in Caracas, at close to 12:00 midday. Reports differ on exactly where in the complex they were taken from: some reports say that they were taken from the underground parking lot connected to the office building where their business was located, others say that they were taken from outside the Rey David restaurant (in an adjacent building), with others saying they were heading into the connected shopping mall. Four men ambushed the pair, who then made Mendoza ask his domestic worker to collect valuables and hand them over; the domestic worker felt the request was strange, as Mendoza had been told to say he needed emergency cash because of a traffic incident. The domestic worker handed over a bag to one of the kidnappers, with currency in US dollars, Euros, and Venezuelan bolívares, as well as personal documents and designer watches. Various unconfirmed sources say the handover may have taken place at a pet park in El Cigarral or a building in La Tahona. Despite reports that the kidnappers stole directly from the victims' homes, police ruled this out.

The kidnappers then contacted the men's families to demand a ransom. Relatives paid a ransom later reported as US$10,000, but the men were killed anyway. Herrera was a member of the House of Herrera, the son of Luis Felipe Herrera Guevara, and the nephew of Reinaldo Herrera and Carolina Herrera. Mendoza, at the time of his murder, was under investigation for receiving $11 million of government money fraudulently through shell companies.

Their bodies were found overnight or the next morning in a Toyota Hilux parked alongside the highway between Caracas and La Guaira. Both had been handcuffed and shot in the head.

== Investigation ==
A commission was opened to investigate the kidnapping and murders. Commissioner Einer Giulliani said that the families did not immediately report the kidnapping to the police upon being contacted, instead negotiating a ransom fee of cash and valuables; the investigation was initially only for kidnapping, the crime which had been reported. The families reported the kidnappings to police at around 22:00 on the same night, 11 May; the time of death for the men was estimated at 19:00. Speaking to the public, Giulliani informed that the crime was strange and "not a common kidnapping", in that it was an organized kidnapping with the perpetrators waiting at a location to take their victims, rather than pursuing them.

Mendoza's domestic worker and security personnel from his apartment building were interviewed and gave a detailed description of the man who had collected the bag of cash. With the help of CCTV from La Boyera, the first kidnapper was identified as Edwin Jesús Montilla Verdi (age 35), who was arrested on 11 June 2017. Montilla was a bodyguard for the mayor of Cristóbal Rojas Municipality and used his government motorcycle in the kidnapping. He confessed to involvement and said he had been paid US$2,500 in cash by a friend to take part, identifying the friend as Suhe González Álvarez (age 37). González was arrested the next day; he also confessed, saying he had been paid US$10,000 in cash, which he shared between himself and three others (including Montilla) he employed, each receiving US$2,500. One of these other kidnappers was Helinger Joel Tovar Araujo (age 26), who already had a criminal record for kidnapping from 2015. González told police that the attack had been ordered on Mendoza by a business partner, who claimed Mendoza owed him a significant amount of money. González said that Herrera was kidnapped and killed because he was with Mendoza at the time.

González identified his contractor as Franco José Pessarolo Salcedo (age 36; also reported as Tessarolo), who owned a vehicle modification company with Mendoza; he was considered Mendoza's right-hand man and was close to his family. González said he had met with Pessarolo in person twice, when he was given maps and detailed itineraries of Mendoza's activities. Phone records of Montilla and González connected them to Pessarolo and the attack; Pessarolo was arrested on 14 June 2017, admitting his involvement but alleging that the mastermind was a former business partner of Mendoza's, Salvador Lairet, based in Miami. Lairet and Mendoza had a major disagreement after Mendoza pulled out of buying property in Panama from Lairet in 2014, with Lairet suing Mendoza. Through document tracing and interviews, police ruled out Lairet being involved and successfully charged the suspects they had arrested – Montilla, González, and Pessarolo – with kidnapping, murder for hire, criminal conspiracy, and aggravated vehicle theft, on 28 July 2017.

As of January 2018, only Montilla had been to trial, where he pleaded guilty. The other suspects were by that point all at large, with the Public Prosecutor leaving the case open.

== Responses ==
The murder was initially considered a politically-motivated attack in the press, due to Herrera's connection to the Popular Will opposition political party and his family's outspoken opposition to the Venezuelan government, until it was reported the next day that the men had been taken as hostages for ransom. Carolina Herrera, prominent fashion designer and Reinaldo José Herrera's aunt, said she hoped the attention drawn by his murder would help to bring action to end the crisis in Venezuela. She blamed the political and social situation in the nation for causing its young people to "butcher" each other, describing the presidency of Nicolás Maduro as a dictatorship and saying it needed to end for peace to return.
