= Gustavo J. Vollmer =

World Scout Committee member

Gustavo J. Vollmer Herrera
- Born: Gustavo José Vollmer Herrera; January 5, 1923; Caracas, Venezuela
- Died: November 2, 2014 (aged 91); Caracas, Venezuela
- Education: Cornell University
- Occupation: Industrialist
- Known for: Served on the World Scout Committee of the World Organization of the Scout Movement
- Spouse: Luisa Acedo Mendoza
- Children: 8
- Parent(s): Alberto Vollmer Boulton; Luisa Herrera Uslar
- Family: Benigno Filomeno de Rojas (great-great-uncle); Jose Felix Ribas (great-great-uncle); José Herrera Uslar (uncle); Julio Herrera Velutini (second cousin); Alfredo Boulton (second cousin); Simón Bolívar (fourth cousin); Ulises Francisco Espaillat (fourth cousin); Arturo Uslar Pietri (fifth cousin)

Dr. Gustavo J. Vollmer Herrera (5 January 1923 – 2 November 2014) of Venezuela was an industrialist and prominent philanthropist.

== Background ==
He was the eldest child of Venezuelans Alberto Fernando Vollmer Boulton, of German, English, French, Dutch, Spanish and Dominican descent (descendant of Juan Manuel) and Luisa Mercedes Herrera Uslar, belonging to the House of Herrera . He married Luisa Mercedes Acedo Mendoza (great-great-granddaughter of Cristóbal Mendoza, descendant of Simón Bolívar's sister, Juana Bolívar, niece of Eugenio Mendoza and Eduardo Mendoza Goiticoa and, at the same time, second cousin of Leopoldo López and Thor Halvorssen) with whom he had eight children: María Teresa, Gustavo Julio, Inés María, Alfredo Ignacio, Luisa Mercedes, Ana Gertrudis, Federico José and María Antonia.

Vollmer, alongside his brother Alberto J. Vollmer Herrera are the patriarchs of the Vollmer clan in Venezuela, the country's oldest business dynasty. Although extremely low profile, the Vollmer family maintains an active ownership and management role in a wide variety of business operations across the agricultural, consumer goods and financial services sectors. The family leads and controls Mercantil Servicios Financieros, the country's leading financial services institution in banking and insurance, with Vollmer's eldest son currently serving as chairman and CEO. They also own and operate Venezuela's largest rum distillery and one of the worldwide leaders in premium rums, Santa Teresa Rum located in El Consejo, Aragua, as well as Central El Palmar, a vast sugarcane refinery, mill and plantation the family owns in neighboring San Mateo, Aragua.

The Vollmer family are also renowned for backing the funding and development of numerous education initiatives across Venezuela. Among the most prominent was their 1963 donation to the Jesuit order of an 80-acre portion of their Hacienda Montalban, in central Caracas, to build what is today the Universidad Católica Andrés Bello, one of the top universities in Venezuela and Latin America. The family is also active in promoting photography, art and culture through the Alberto Vollmer Foundation, and runs several award-winning initiatives in social development and inclusion through the Santa Teresa Foundation.

Vollmer graduated with a degree in Civil Engineering from Cornell University in Ithaca, New York, USA.

Vollmer also served as President of the National Council of the Asociación de Scouts de Venezuela, President of the Interamerican Regional Scout Council, and as a member of the World Scout Committee of the World Organization of the Scout Movement from 1963 to 1969 and again from 1973 to 1979.

In 1969, Vollmer was awarded the Bronze Wolf, the only distinction of the World Organization of the Scout Movement, awarded by the World Scout Committee for exceptional services to world Scouting, at the 22nd World Scout Conference. He also received the Silver Buffalo in 1965, and the highest distinction of the Scout Association of Japan, the Golden Pheasant Award, in 1968.
