= José Herrera Uslar =

Venezuelan lawyer (1906–??)

- Born: Jose Herrera Uslar; January 4, 1906; Venezuela
- Spouse: Clementina Velutini (m. 1932; died 1998)
- Children: 3
- Parent(s): José Herrera; Carolina Uslar
- Family: Julio Herrera Velutini (grandson); Gustavo J. Vollmer (nephew); Reinaldo Herrera (nephew); Roberto Antonio Picón Herrera (great nephew); Arturo Uslar Pietri (fourth cousin)

José Herrera Uslar (born January 4, 1906) was the son of José Francisco Herrera Manrique and Carolina Uslar Urbaneja, belonging to one of the founding families of the Valley of Caracas and owners of the Hacienda la Vega.

== Personal life ==
He married Clementina Velutini Pérez (great-niece of José Antonio Velutini) and they adopted three war orphans who had taken refuge in Switzerland: José Herrera Velutini, Julio José Herrera Velutini and Christina Herrera Velutini; and they had ten grandchildren: Mercedes Clementina Herrera Titeux, José Henrique Herrera Titeux, Santiago, Diego Bernardo Herrera Titeux; Julio Martin Herrera Velutini, Carlos Alberto Herrera Kolster, José Francisco Herrera Kolster; Julio José Herrera Pacheco; Cristina María Pantin Herrera and Andrés Kochen.

== Professional life ==
Uslar was a lawyer who founded, along with Juan Jose Mendoza, Martin Vegas, Manuel Antonio Matos, Francisco Pimentel, and others, the Progressive Republican Party (PRP) in 1936. Its purpose was to fight against extremism, social dissolution, relaxation, and opposing the spread of Marxist ideology in Venezuela.

In 1950, as an Ambassador of Venezuela in Sweden, Uslar organized the transfer of 1,000 war orphans from Switzerland. They arrived to the country in batches of 50 children, and were later brought to the colony of Catia La Mar, where they were adopted by Venezuelan families.

On January 14, 1930 he founded the Basketball Federation of Venezuela.
