= Reinaldo Herrera =

Venezuelan aristocrat (1933–2025)

- Herrera in 1968
- Born: Reinaldo José Patricio del Monte Carmelo y de las Mercedes Herrera y Guevara (Note: Full name: Don Reinaldo José Patricio del Monte Carmelo y de las Mercedes Herrera y Guevara. Sometimes, both of his father's surnames are included, which can be written as Herrera-Uslar y Guevara. His mother's first surname has been noted as "Ladrón de Guevara", and his surnames in that instance written as Herrera y Ladrón de Guevara. It is therefore possible that his name at its most complete was Don Reinaldo José Patricio del Monte Carmelo y de las Mercedes Herrera-Uslar y Ladrón de Guevara, Marquís de Torre Casa.); 26 July 1933; Caracas, Venezuela
- Died: 18 March 2025 (aged 91); New York City, U.S.
- Resting place: Caracas, Venezuela
- Citizenship: Venezuela; United States
- Title: 5th Marquis de Torre Casa (1975–1992)
- Spouse: Carolina Herrera (m. 1968)
- Children: 2
- Parent(s): Reinaldo Herrera Uslar; María Guevara Pietrantoni
- Family: José Herrera Uslar (uncle); Roberto Antonio Picón Herrera (nephew); Gustavo J. Vollmer (cousin); Julio Herrera Velutini (second cousin); Arturo Uslar Pietri (fifth cousin)

Reinaldo Herrera Guevara (26 July 1933 – 18 March 2025) was a Venezuelan-American socialite and journalist. Born to a noble Venezuelan family, he was the 5th Marquis de Torre Casa—a Spanish title—for seventeen years. His significant American education and decades as a jet setter ingratiating himself with the global elite positioned him for his career within media. After several years hosting early talk show Buenos días, he was employed by Vanity Fair for smooth relations with high society figures. He was married to fashion designer Carolina Herrera.

== Early life and family ==
Reinaldo Herrera Guevara was born to Don Reinaldo Herrera Uslar, 4th Marquis de Torre Casa, and María Teresa Guevara Pietrantoni de Uslar, members of Venezuelan nobility and the House of Herrera, on 26 July 1933 in Caracas. He was the eldest of four children, with siblings including Luis Felipe and Carolina. Their father was a prominent Venezuelan sugarcane plantation owner, aristocrat, and art collector. Reinaldo Herrera Guevara grew up in the Hacienda La Vega, one of the first properties owned by the Herrera dynasty in Latin America.

In 1975, Herrera inherited the title Marquis de Torre Casa, a Spanish noble title re-created in 1924 by Alfonso XIII. Cited as Don Reinaldo Herrera y Guevara, he had petitioned for succession due to his father's death in 1973, which was confirmed in 1975. He ceded the title to Alejandro Alfonzo-Larraín Recao in 1992 after the court of Madrid ruled that, since Herrera had no male heirs, it could not continue in his branch.

He did not visit Venezuela after 2013, and described what the nation became under Nicolás Maduro as "horrific". In May 2017, Herrera's nephew, also called Reinaldo Herrera, was kidnapped and murdered in Venezuela along with a business partner; another nephew, Roberto Antonio Picón Herrera, was involved in election oversight for the Democratic Unity Roundtable and in June 2017 was detained as a political prisoner.

== Education and career ==
Herrera was educated in the United States, attending prep school at St. Mark's School before Harvard University and Georgetown University. He was a television journalist in Venezuela, and one of the inaugural hosts of Buenos días on RCTV from 1966 into the 1970s. He then began working for Vanity Fair before 1980, and was made a contributing editor by Tina Brown, who had interviewed him at Tatler. Brown recognized the magazine needed "to become the hottest, slickest, most informed page-turner" and that Herrera would be invaluable.

His official role at Vanity Fair was as special projects editor, though he served as a general fixer for it, based on his extensive connections. When the magazine was threatened with closure in 1985 and decided its fortunes would rely on a Ronald Reagan cover issue, Herrera "pulled the strings" to get them access to the Reagans. He did also pitch stories while at Vanity Fair, and was one of four editors at the magazine who helped Eleanor Lambert curate the Best Dressed lists before the quartet took it over; Herrera, his wife, and both of his biological daughters would be inducted into the Best Dressed Hall of Fame by 2000. Former deputy editor Dana Brown wrote that Herrera was "maybe the most charismatic and charming man to ever exist", noting that he was known at the magazine as Reggie.

Among his other publishing roles, he worked for Town & Country magazine.

== Personal life and death ==
When he was a young man, Herrera began an affair with Tina Onassis Niarchos after meeting in Paris at a ball hosted by Marie-Hélène de Rothschild. Herrera asked Onassis to marry him and she agreed, asking her husband, Aristotle Onassis, for a divorce; Aristotle refused a divorce, but gave consent for the affair to continue, including around him and their children. The Onassises divorced in 1960, and though Herrera had been Tina's "most constant" affair, they did not have plans to wed.

He married childhood friend María Carolina Josefina Pacanins y Niño in 1968 in Caracas. Carolina and her two daughters from a previous marriage moved into the Hacienda La Vega, with the couple also maintaining a home in New York City. Together, they have two biological daughters, and six grandchildren:

- Carolina Adriana Herrera-Pacanins (b. 1969), who was married to Miguel Báez Spínola between 2004 and 2017. Their three children are: Olympia Baez, Miguel Baez V, and Atalanta Baez. As of 2025, Carolina Jr. was in a relationship with Portuguese businessman Pedro de Noronha.
- Patricia Cristina Herrera-Pacanins, who married Gerrit Livingston Lansing Jr., a son of Suydam Rosengarten Lansing and Gerrit Livingston Lansing Sr. (a descendant of Robert Livingston), in 2002. The two have three children together: Carolina Lansing-Herrera, Gerrit Lansing-Herrera, and Magnus Lansing-Herrera.

Herrera also shared his wife's other daughters, Mercedes and Ana Luisa. All six moved their primary residence to New York when Herrera became an editor at Vanity Fair, with his wife deciding to put her fledgling fashion career on hold until the children were older. Herrera died in New York on 18 March 2025, at the age of 91. His body was repatriated and interred at the family site in Caracas on 21 March.

== Notes ==
Spanish nobility
Preceded by Reinaldo Herrera Uslar	5th Marquis de Torre Casa; 1975–1992	Succeeded by Alejandro Alfonzo-Larraín Recao
