= Roberto Antonio Picón Herrera =

Venezuelan systems engineer and civil servant

Roberto Antonio Picón Herrera (b. c. 1963) is a Venezuelan systems engineer and former civil servant in the field of election management.

== Family ==
Roberto Antonio Picón Herrera was born in approximately 1963 in Venezuela to Roberto Picón Parra and Carolina Herrera Guevara. His parents had married on 3 June 1961. Through his mother, he is a member of the House of Herrera; he is a nephew of Reinaldo Herrera (his mother's brother) and Carolina Herrera (Reinaldo's wife).

== MUD and forced disappearance ==
Picón began working in the field of voting systems for the Democratic Unity Roundtable (MUD), a coalition of Venezuelan opposition parties, in 2011. In June 2017, he was detained as a political prisoner. On 22 June he had been visiting a building in Altamira, Caracas, when the Bolivarian National Intelligence Service (SEBIN) unlawfully raided it and arrested various people present, including Picón. Five days later, a search warrant for the building was issued, as a location of interest for the supposed storage of stolen SEBIN equipment used in riots. The retroactive warrant was based on anonymous information, and Picón's name was not mentioned even in the broader information. On 25 June, Nicolás Maduro made a public broadcast accusing Picón of sabotaging the then-upcoming 2017 Venezuelan Constituent Assembly election, which Maduro said was the reason for his detention. Picón was held without charge at El Helicoide for over 90 days, initially without communication as to his whereabouts. He was not given access to legal advice, and his case was put before a military court.

The lack of process in his detention – which the Venezuelan government, when questioned, did not deny – and the understanding that he was arrested in order to prevent his work for the MUD in promoting free and fair elections, caused the United Nations to issue an opinion in November 2017 (published in January 2018) that the Venezuelan government was in violation of both the Universal Declaration of Human Rights and the International Covenant on Civil and Political Rights.

== CNE ==
In 2021, Picón became one of the heads (rectors) of the government's National Electoral Council (CNE), as one of five members. The five rectors were appointed through a series of negotiations to include representation in the CNE from opposition political groups as well as those which were government-aligned. Prior to the 2021 Venezuelan regional elections, Picón posted on Twitter that the CNE knew of at least 24 people who had been arbitrarily prevented from running as candidates; Picón was the only member of the CNE to criticise the arbitrary detentions of successful opposition politicians during violence following the 2021 elections. He resigned on 19 June 2023 as the ninth CNE official to resign that week, citing irregularities and lack of transparency preventing them from managing elections.
