= Thor Halvorssen (businessman) =

Venezuelan-Norwegian businessman

Thor Halvorssen Hellum
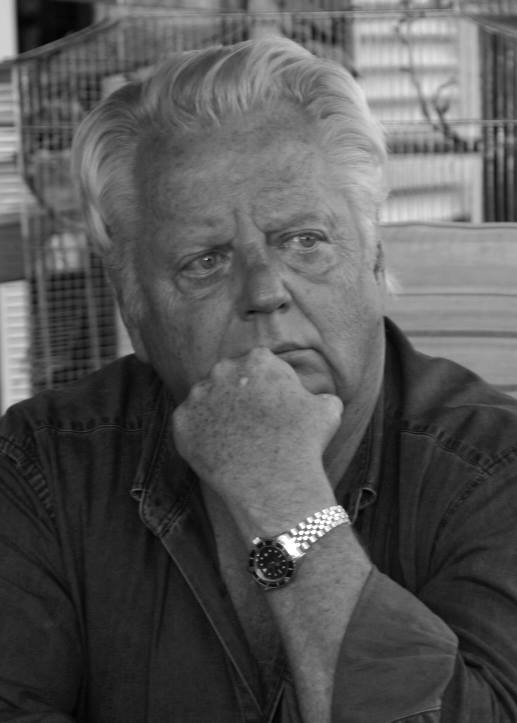
- Born: May 16, 1943; Venezuela
- Died: July 20, 2014 (aged 71); Miami, Florida, US
- Occupations: Businessman, ambassador, and special commissioner on drugs

Thor Halvorssen Hellum (Spanish: [ˈtoɾ (x)alˈβoɾsen], May 16, 1943 – July 20, 2014) was a Venezuelan-Norwegian businessman who was CEO and President of the Venezuelan state-owned telephone company CANTV, and later was "special commissioner for international narcotic affairs" in the administration of President Carlos Andrés Pérez, holding the rank of Ambassador. While investigating links to money laundering and drug trafficking, he was detained after a terrorist attack, and was later cleared of any involvement. Halvorssen's case was taken up by Amnesty International and other international human rights organizations. After his release, Halvorssen moved with his family to Miami, where he lived until his death.

== Early life and education ==
Halvorssen, of Norwegian descent, is one of the four sons of a Norwegian businessman, Øystein Halvorssen. His father became the president of GMAC (now Ally Financial) in Venezuela before he began his own business operations, and also was the Norwegian Crown's consul-general in Caracas from 1938. According to the journalist Gaeton Fonzi, who wrote an investigative story about Halvorssen's life, he led the "jet-setting life style" of a "happy-go-lucky" son of a wealthy businessman. With his twin brother Olaf, he befriended Jerry Wolman, the owner of the Philadelphia Eagles football team, with the three becoming partners in real estate transactions and night clubs. Halvorssen's father died while he attended University of Pennsylvania; Halvorssen graduated from the university in 1966 and completed a Wharton School of the University of Pennsylvania MBA in 1969.

== Business career ==
After graduating, Halvorssen returned to Caracas and inherited the family businesses, often spending time at the Caracas Country Club or traveling internationally. Halvorssen’s activities were wide-ranging; he owned of Venezuelan insurance company AXXA Corretaje de Seguros and held representation positions at international conglomerates Dunlop, Ericsson, and British Cellophane. Halvorssen was also a real estate developer, owning the company that built the 350-room Melia Caribe hotel.

== Governmental career ==
=== Head of CANTV ===
President Carlos Andres Pérez was elected in 1974 and in 1977 appointed Halvorssen, then 34, president of the Venezuelan state-owned telephone company CANTV; Halvorssen was president and CEO of CANTV from 1978 until Pérez completed his term. While the head of CANTV, Halvorssen became more involved with the National Directorate of Intelligence and Prevention Services (DISIP). Halvorssen has said that in the 1980s he had worked closely with Duane Clarridge, the chief of the CIA's Latin American operations. His son rejects that Halvorssen had a special relationship with the CIA.

=== Special commissioner on anti-narcotic affairs ===
When President Pérez was elected President again in 1989, he named Halvorssen Venezuela's "special commissioner for international narcotic affairs" with the rank of ambassador. As chief of anti-narcotics, Halvorssen was behind the extradition to Italy of the Cuntrera-Caruana Mafia clan members Pasquale, Paolo and Gaspare Cuntrera. Gaeton Fonzi, former U.S. Senate investigator, wrote that "the remaining Mafia in Venezuela do not remember Halvorssen fondly for that". Halvorssen worked closely with Manhattan District Attorney Robert M. Morgenthau investigating the financial affairs of Venezuelan government officials. Halvorssen discovered the secret bank accounts of Venezuelan president Carlos Andrés Pérez, the man who had appointed Halvorssen. The evidence revealed $19 million that Perez and his mistress, Cecilia Matos, had deposited into numbered accounts. This discovery and the airing of the evidence in Venezuela led to the impeachment of President Perez in May 1993.

When Pérez offered him the position of "drug czar", Halvorssen says he accepted because, "I went to a detoxification clinic in the US and I was so appalled by what I saw there that I resolved that I would do anything I could to fight drug trafficking." According to Isabel Hilton, writing in the British edition of Gentleman's Quarterly (GQ), observers say that Pérez may even have offered Halvorssen the job as a necessary matching gesture when US president George H. W. Bush appointed William Bennett as his Director of National Drug Control Policy, thinking that Halvorssen was still drinking and would not raise issues. Halvorssen performed his duties well, deciding to use his worldwide contacts and intelligence connections to detail the extent of Venezuela's role in the drug world. Halvorssen believed that Pérez was not responding to his reports on drug trafficking and money laundering, so Halvorssen approached his ally, Venezuelan Senator Cristobal Fernandez Daló. In 1992, he was appointed special overseas investigator of an Anti-Money-Laundering Commission by the Venezuelan Senate. He was a liaison between law enforcement agencies around the world, working on drug and money-laundering cases.

==== Notable investigations ====
During his time as commissioner, Halvorssen began an investigation with the assistance of New York District Attorney Robert Morgenthau, uncovering that President Pérez had a secret $19 million account with his mistress Cecilia Matos.

After Cuban-Venezuelan Orlando Castro Llanes–one of Venezuela's wealthiest individuals–attempted a takeover of the Venezuelan elite's Banco de Venezuela in 1990, the bank paid Halvorssen $1.7 million to investigate Castro. The investigations by Halvorssen revealed that Castro was a business associate of Pablo Escobar, head of the Medellin drug cartel. Evidence included business letters between Escobar and his lawyer making reference to Castro's banking and insurance companies.

== Arrest and imprisonment ==
In 1993, while Halvorssen was investigating the now defunct Banco Latino and the Grupo Progreso, he was arrested on charges of terrorism, which an anonymous Venezuelan congressman described at the time as a "set up because he was investigating Medellín Cartel finances and links to Venezuelan businessmen and officials." Halvorssen was one of 12 people arrested after a series of six bomb attacks in Caracas in July and August 1993. Police said the motive was profit—to capitalize on stock market fluctuations caused by the bombs. Halvorssen denied the charges and stated that he had made no stock or bond transactions in the Venezuelan stock market for two decades. One of the alleged members of the group of bombers, Ramiro Helmeyer, told police that Halvorssen was the leader of the conspiracy. Helmeyer later recanted his confession, telling journalists that the police "tortured me so that I would accuse Thor Halvorssen". Halvorssen was ultimately released with no charges ever being filed. And the judge admonished the police for having ever detained Halvorssen when there was no evidence provided to hold Halvorssen. Helmeyer, who had admitted his own involvement in the bombings, was ultimately convicted of murder and sentenced to 30 years in prison.

Halvorssen was initially held without an order of arrest for eight days and was later moved to the Retén de Catia prison, a maximum security prison home to Venezuela's most notorious criminals. Havlorssen's son, Thor Halvorssen, led an international movement calling for his father's release. International organizations, including Amnesty International, a Nicaraguan cardinal, and members of the British Parliament, protested Halvorssen case. Halvorssen was exonerated and his order of arrest rescinded. No charges were ever filed against him. After his release, the United Nations-affiliated International Society for Human Rights appointed him director of their Pan-American Committee. During his time in prison, when there was an all out media campaign against him, Halvorssen was supported by the New York District Attorney Robert Morgenthau who praised his efforts as someone who provided assistance to his office in the fight against the international narcotics business, as well as to federal law enforcement officials of the United States. He was released from prison after 74 days and moved to the Jockey Club luxury condominium two days later.

In March 1994, Halvorssen wrote a Wall Street Journal editorial recounting his ordeal and explained that prior to his arrest he had been investigating Banco Latino for money laundering and for being a Ponzi scheme. Halvorssen explained that he was arrested in Caracas one day after a Banco Latino official asked him to come to Venezuela from New York for a meeting with the bank's chairman. Halvorssen was warned by a U.S. Treasury Department agent that the meeting with Banco Latino was a trap. Halvorssen went anyway and was arrested.

In GQ magazine, Isabel Hilton also covers Halvorssen's investigation of Orlando Castro Llanes. Hilton states that Castro was involved in arranging the false arrest of Halvorssen and the media campaign to destroy his reputation. According to Halvorssen, Castro was linked as a money laundering partner to drug kingpin Pablo Escobar in a letter written by Escobar to his attorney; the authenticity of the letter remains questioned.

Castro had visited Halvorssen in prison with his son who beat Halvorssen while he was handcuffed to a chair. Wire reports and newspaper articles written during his time in prison portrayed Halvorssen as guilty and corrupt. A framework of opinion was created to destroy any credibility Halvorssen could have when testifying in a court of law in the United States. Regarding the charges of terrorism she writes: "In reality, the police case against Halvorssen was non-existent…He was completely exonerated." Armando Valladares describes Halvorssen's decision to serve as anti-Drug Czar as "quixotic" for having "simultaneously took on the entire banking sector without a budget or structural support in the government."

=== Aftermath ===
Three weeks after Halvorssen's release, Banco Latino folded and its directors were charged with numerous crimes. They are still fugitives. Depositors lost billions of dollars. Orlando Castro Llanes fled Venezuela and was ultimately extradited from Miami to New York to face charges of grand larceny and theft.

Castro's own banks also collapsed leaving depositors unable to recuperate their savings. On April 4, 1996, Castro was indicted in New York by District Attorney Robert Morgenthau. Castro's son and grandson were also arrested on charges of a scheme to defraud in the first degree. They were also under investigation by the US Federal Reserve for laundering more than US$3 billion. The three Castros were convicted on grand larceny charges on February 19, 1997, and in April of that year sentenced to various prison terms. The larceny charges involved defrauding depositors of the Banco Progreso International de Puerto Rico of as much as US$55 million while it was reported that some of his actions cost the government of Venezuela more than US$8 million.

Charles Intriago—attorney for Orlando Castro and former federal prosecutor, as well as editor of Money Laundering Alert, the newsletter financed by Orlando Castro, and the well-known host of a biennial national money-laundering conference that attracts justice and law enforcement authorities, came to Castro Llanes’ defense and countered that Halvorssen ran a "smear campaign" and fed lies to US officials. It was later disclosed that Money Laundering Alert had received its seed money from Castro. Intriago's activities came under investigation of the House Government Reform Committee where he repeatedly plead the Fifth Amendment when asked about his involvement with Castro and his own illegal campaign contributions to the re-election campaign of President Bill Clinton. Despite Intriago's claims that Castro was an honest businessman being smeared by Halvorssen, Castro was convicted and sentenced to prison in 1997. After completing his prison sentence Castro was extradited to Venezuela to stand trial for bank fraud. He was convicted and sent to El Junquito prison.

== Movie rights ==
New York film producer Marla Shelton purchased the rights to Halvorssen's life story while working for Academy-Award winning director James Ivory of Merchant Ivory Productions. The script titled "Smoke and Mirrors" was written for the screen by Venezuelan architect and author Alex Ceppi. Bestselling British investigative author David Yallop wrote a novel, Unholy Alliance, that included the story of his own involvement in Halvorssen's case.

== Personal life ==
Thor Halvorssen married Hilda Margarita Mendoza (daughter of Eduardo Mendoza Goiticoa and aunt of Leopoldo López) for the first time, with whom he had three children: Eduardo Leonard, Thor Halvorssen (human rights activist) and Randi. He remarried Nelly Yánez. Halvorssen had three brothers: Stein, Erik, and Olaf.

Halvorssen was involved in charitable programs later in his life. At 36, Halvorssen became involved in community service, working at Venezuela's largest grant-giving charitable foundation, the Dividendo Voluntario Para La Comunidad for six years and serving as its President from 1976–1979. He assisted with building sports facilities in the poorest barrios with a focus on baseball.

He became interested in human rights work in the 1980s, providing financial support for victims of human rights violations in Central America that had been ignored during the proxy conflicts of the Cold War by co-founding the Caracas-based Romulo Gallegos human rights organization from where he took up the causes of Nicaragua’s Miskito and focused on violations of human rights by Marxist rebel groups throughout Central American and Colombia. Halvorssen participated in the creation and financing of the “alternative human right forums” that began in Geneva in the early 1990s. Halvorssen served on the boards of the Andrei Sakharov Institute and headed the Pan-American committee of the International Society for Human Rights.

== Death ==
Halvorssen Hellum died on July 20, 2014, due to a head injury suffered after a fall at his Miami home.

== Notes ==
^{a} Halvorssen Hellum is known commonly as Thor Halvorssen. Per Venezuelan naming conventions, his full legal name includes both his father's (Halvorssen) and mother's (Hellum) surnames. His full, legal, Venezuelan name distinguishes him from his son, Thor Halvorssen Mendoza. (See Thor Halvorssen - Presidente. The Human Rights Foundation. Retrieved on July 21, 2007. (in Spanish) Also see re: Francisco Usón—Political Prisoner and Prisoner of Conscience. Human Rights Foundation. Retrieved on July 21, 2007.)
