= Michel Ferracci-Porri =

French writer (born 1949)

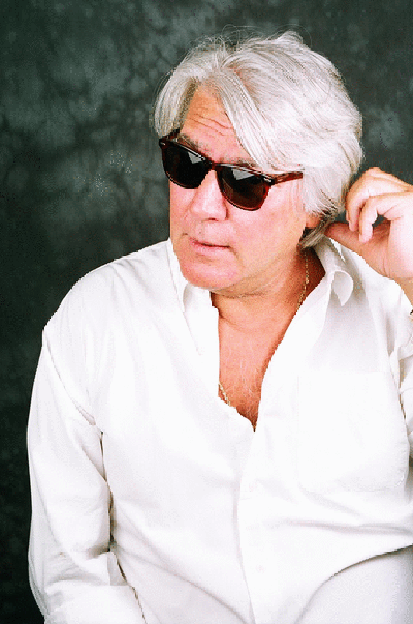
- French writer
- Born: 24 September 1949 (age 76); Ajaccio, Corsica, France
- Occupation: Writer
- Writing career
- Genre: True crime

Michel Ferracci-Porri (born 24 September 1949) is a French writer.

== Bibliography ==
- La Môme Moineau (Normant Ed. France 2006) (ISBN 978-2-915685-28-2)
- Beaux Ténèbres, la pulsion du mal d'Eugène Weidman (Normant Ed. France 2008) (ISBN 978-2-915685-34-3)
- The Affair of the Phantom of Heilbronn/ L'Affaire du Fantôme de Heilbronn Ed. Normant. France 2009) (ISBN 978-2-915685-42-8)
- Joyeuse Encyclopédie Anecdotique de la Gastronomie with Maryline Paoli. Preface by Christian Millau (Normant Ed. France 2012) (ISBN 978-2-915685-55-8)
- L'Affaire Brian Blackwell ou La Rage de Narcisse/The Brian Blackwell Case or The Rage of Narcissus.(Normant Ed. France, April 2015) (ISBN 978-2-915685-62-6)
