= François Gaffori =

François Antoine Gaffori (14 August 1744, in Corte – February 1796, in Corte) was a Corsican politician and soldier. He was the son of Ghjuvan Petru Gaffori, leader of the Corsican resistance to Genoese rule.

== Life ==
When his father was assassinated by Roméi at the instigation of the Genoese government, François Gaffori was only nine years old. As a teenager he became a partner-in-arms with his father's successor Pasquale Paoli, who made him one of the main leaders of his army's militia components. François Gaffori and Buttafuoco by a stratagem sought and favoured French intervention on Corsica, which strongly displeased Paoli.

When Corsica became French, François Gaffori joined the French royal army on 1 September 1769 and was attached to the Corsican legion. The king made him a captain of dragoons, the legion having non-Corsican infantrymen but Corsican infantry officers. Trained at the military school at Tarascon, he was transferred to the garrison at Libourne, then Strasbourg, then back to the garrison at Libourne. François Gaffori was promoted to major on 16 April 1771. He was put in command of the regiment with the rank of colonel on 23 August 1772 – this new corps was based on Corsica and he took over the duties of the local gendarmerie

In 1788 he was made maréchal de camp and deputy to the island's commander in chief, replacing Armand Charles de la Galissonnière vicomte de Barrin. Bastia was then in turmoil and colonel de Rully (commander of the régiment du Maine) was assassinated on 18 April 1790. The proclamation of the Civil Constitution of the Clergy also aroused an uprising among the highly religious islanders.

François Gaffori was promoted to general and ordered to suppress the new ideas espoused by the young Bonaparte. However, he was greeted with disdain and forced to stay away from his friend Bacciocchi, the future prince of Lucca and Piombino and husband of Napoleon's sister Elisa. Betrayed by Gaffori some years before, Paoli returned to Corsica in 1790 as a result of an amnesty and on seeing him said "So, Gaffori, still just as small" (referring to his small-mindness as well as his small physical stature). Paoli forced Gaffori to leave Corsica with his family to spend some years in Tuscany before returning to the island in 1794 in secret, dying at Corte in February 1796.

== Marriage and issue ==
Around 1767 François Gaffori married Maria Apollonia Sansonetta, with whom he had 12 children, including:

- Marie-Anne Gaffori, known as la Gafforina, who married Mathieu Buttafuoco, François's old comrade in the Paolist resistance
- François-Louis Gaffori, born around 1770, lawyer, then colonel in the National Guard, then procureur impérial to the tribunal of Vico.
- Gian Pietro Gaffori, father of François-Xavier Gaffori (1811)1877), bishop of Ajaccio,
- Anne Félicie Gaffori (1784–1807), who in 1799 married Stéphane Tertian (1774–1802), son of Denys Tertian (1745–1818), a doctor who had come to Corsica as surgeon-major to the army

== Corsican context ==
The island had four députés :

- Charles-Antoine Peretti della Rocca: Canon and grand vicar of the diocese of Aléria, for the clergy
- Mathieu Buttafuoco: maréchal de camp and knight of the order of Saint Louis, for the nobility
- Christophe Saliceti: lawyer, for the third estate
- Pierre-Paul Colonna de Cesari-Rocca (1748–1829), captain of the régiment provincial, député for the third estate on Corsica

François Gaffori was elected by the nobility, as a supplementary député.

The first two députés opposed the revolution and the two others favoured it, dividing the island in two, with Bastia favouring the clergy and Ajaccio (supported by Gaffori's troops) which stirred up the people and high-ranking young people like the Bonaparte brothers and Charles-André Pozzo di Borgo (1764–1842).

== Honours ==
- 1780: Order of Saint Louis
- 1784: Brigadier des armées du roi – honorary peacetime title
