= Juan Liscano =

Venezuelan writer (1915–2001)

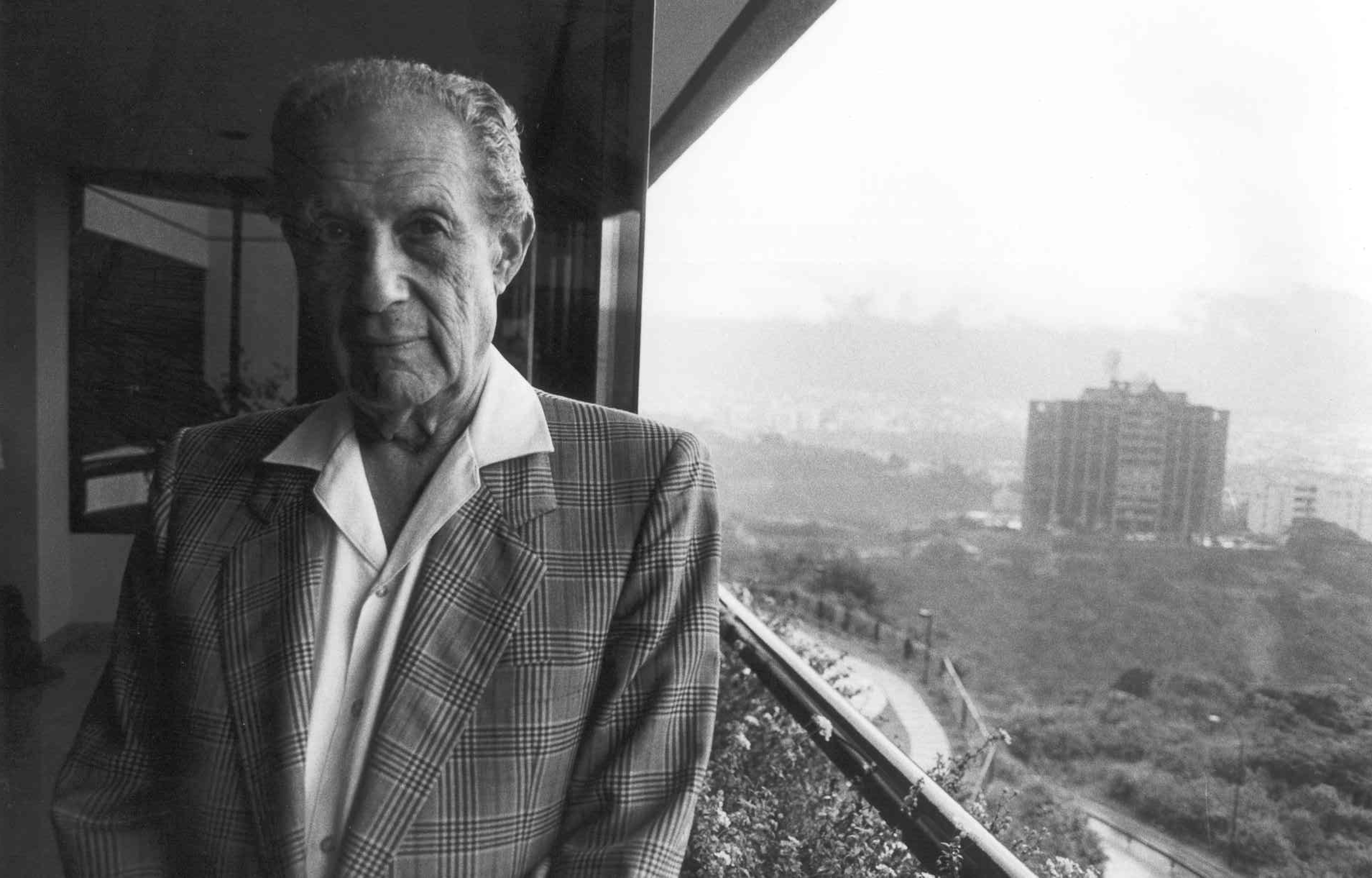
- Juan Liscano in 1994
- Born: Juan Liscano Velutini; 7 July 1915; Caracas, Venezuela
- Died: 17 February 2001 (aged 85); Caracas, Venezuela
- Occupations: poet, folklorist, writer, critic
- Spouse: Josefina Soto
- Children: 3
- Parent(s): Juan Liscano; Clementina Velutini
- Family: José Antonio Velutini (grandfather); Luis Emilio Velutini (third cousin); Julio Herrera Velutini (fifth cousin); Leopoldo López (fifth cousin); Thor Halvorssen (fifth cousin)

Signature
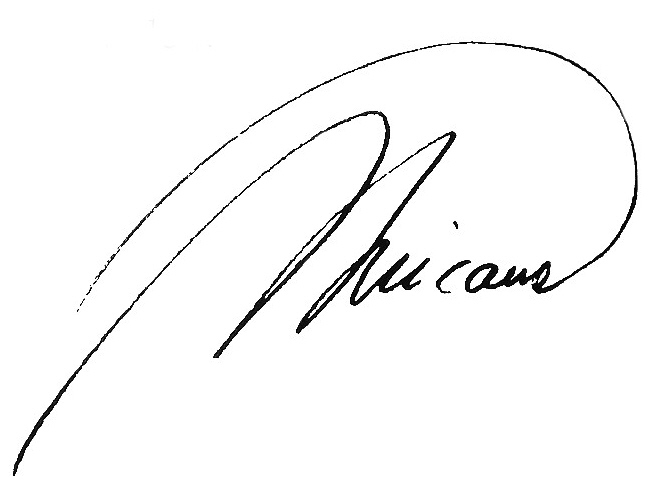

Juan Liscano Velutini (7 July 1915 – 17 February 2001) was a Venezuelan poet, folklorist, writer and critic. He was director of Monte Ávila Editores. Major examples of his poetic work are: Nuevo mundo Orinoco (1959), Cármenes (1966) and Fundaciones (1981). Also wrote: Panorama de la literatura venezolana actual (1973) Espiritualidad y literatura: una relación tormentosa (1976), Los fuegos apagados (1990) and El origen sigue siendo (1991). In 1990, Liscano published a personal anthology, a route for his poetic trajectory. He won the Venezuelan National Prize for Literature in 1951.

== Life and career ==
Liscano was born in Caracas in 1915. He was the editor of the journal Zona franca from 1964 to 1983. He was interested in the pre-colonization folk culture of the coastal regions of Venezuela, reflected in his early works. As a supporter of President Rómulo Gallegos, he was exiled from Venezuela for ten years after Gallegos' presidency ended in a military coup.

== See also ==
- Venezuelan literature
