= Marcu Biancarelli =

Corsican writer

Marcu Biancarelli (French pronunciation: [maʁk bjɑ̃kaʁɛli], Corsican pronunciation: [ˈmarku bjaŋkaˈrelli]; born 1968) is a Corsican novelist and writer. Born in 1968, he teaches the Corsican language in a high school in southern Corsica. He is the author of several books in Corsican, one of which Murtoriu has been translated into French by Jérôme Ferrari, Marc-Olivier Ferrari et Jean-François Rosecchi and published by Actes Sud and into Dutch by Marilena Verheus, published by Zirimiri Press.
