= Thor Halvorssen (human rights activist) =

Venezuelan-Norwegian human rights activist (born 1976)

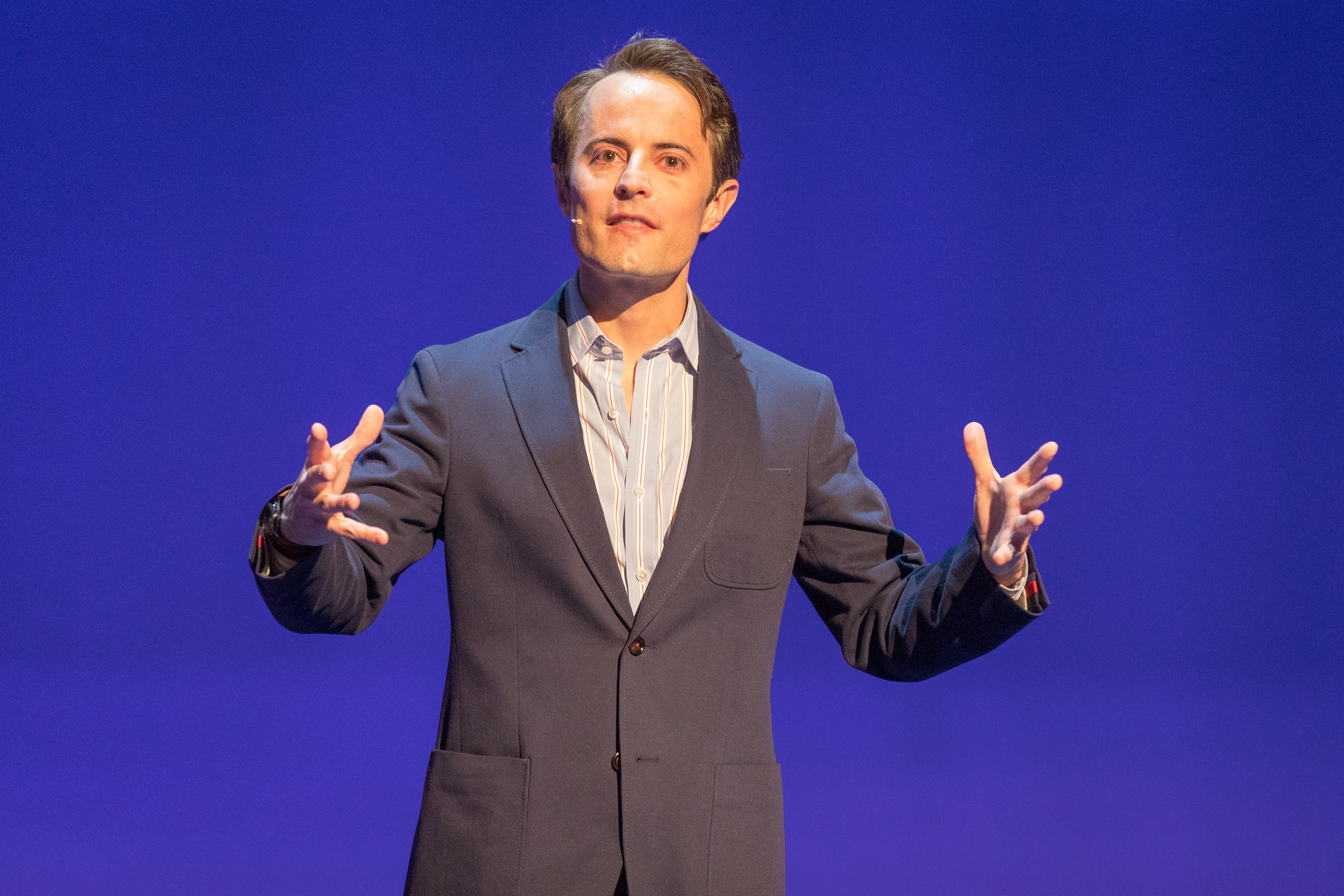
- Halvorssen in 2018
- Born: Thor Leonardo Halvorssen Mendoza; March 9, 1976 (age 50); Caracas, Venezuela
- Citizenship: Venezuela; Norway; United States
- Education: University of Pennsylvania (BA, MA)
- Organization(s): Human Rights Foundation (Founder and CEO); Oslo Freedom Forum (Founder)
- Parent(s): Thor Halvorssen Hellum; Hilda Mendoza Coburn
- Family: Eduardo Mendoza Goiticoa (grandfather); Eugenio Mendoza (great uncle); José Antonio Velutini (great-great-uncle); Leopoldo López (cousin); Luis Emilio Velutini (third half cousin); Juan Liscano (fifth cousin)

Thor Leonardo Halvorssen Mendoza (born 1976; Spanish pronunciation: [ˈtoɾ (x)alˈβoɾsen])^{[a]} is a Venezuelan-born Norwegian human rights activist and film producer with contributions in the field of public policy.

Halvorssen is founder of the annual Oslo Freedom Forum and president of the Human Rights Foundation, an organization that states their mission is to promote freedom in authoritarian regimes. Halvorssen bought the Norwegian news magazine Ny Tid in 2010.

Halvorssen has appeared on television outlets such as Fox News Channel, MSNBC, and CNN. He was a speaker at TEDx at the University of Pennsylvania in 2010.

== Background ==
Halvorssen was born in Venezuela to Hilda Mendoza, a descendant and a relative, respectively, of Venezuela's first president Cristóbal Mendoza and liberator Simón Bolívar. His father is Thor Halvorssen Hellum, who served as a Venezuelan Ambassador for anti-Narcotic Affairs in the administration of Carlos Andrés Pérez and as special overseas investigator of a Venezuelan Senate Commission. His family was prosperous and on his father's side he is the grandson of Øystein Halvorssen, who served as Norway's honorary consul-general in Caracas and who "built a family dynasty as the Venezuelan representative for corporations including Dunlop, Alfa Laval and Ericsson." His cousin is the Venezuelan politician Leopoldo Lopez. Halvorssen attended the University of Pennsylvania in Philadelphia, where he graduated Phi Beta Kappa and magna cum laude with concurrent undergraduate and graduate degrees in political science and history.

Halvorssen's father, also named Thor Halvorssen, was a wealthy businessman who was named the CEO of Venezuela's state-owned telephone company CANTV. In 1989, then-President Carlos Andrés Pérez appointed Halvorssen Sr. as Venezuela's "anti-drug ambassador". When Halvorssen was a freshman at the University of Pennsylvania, in 1993, his father was arrested after a series of bombings around the capital city Caracas. His father had been working on money laundering investigations into the Medellin cartel and had been framed to stop his investigations. His father was beaten during his 74-day incarceration in a Caracas jail. Halvorssen helped organize the campaign with Amnesty International and other organizations to pressure the Venezuelan authorities to free his father. Halvorssen was never charged and ultimately freed after 74 days of detainment. After his release, the International Society for Human Rights appointed him director of their Pan-American Committee.

While attending a peaceful protest of the Venezuelan recall referendum of 2004, Halvorssen's mother, Hilda Mendoza Denham, a British subject, was wounded by a gunshot. Images of government supporters firing upon the demonstrators were captured by a live television broadcast. The gunmen were later apprehended, tried, had their sentences revoked, tried again, found guilty, and received 3-year sentences for murder and for bodily harm. They were released after serving six months in prison.

== Activism ==
Halvorssen has lectured on the subject of human rights including at Harvard Law School, the New York City Junto, the United Nations Association in New York, and the American Enterprise Institute. Halvorssen has also spoken at the British parliament for the Henry Jackson Society.

Halvorssen testified to the U.S. Congress that he was the target of a smear campaign by Fusion GPS, a private company that also targeted Sir William Browder and, later Donald Trump. Halvorssen provided testimony about Fusion GPS to the U.S. Senate Judiciary Committee in July 2017.

=== Foundation for Individual Rights in Education ===
In 1999, Halvorssen became the first executive director and chief executive officer of the Foundation for Individual Rights Expression (FIRE).

In 2001, Halvorssen stated that, "Liberty of opinion, speech, and expression is indispensable to a free and, in the deepest sense, progressive society. Deny it to one, and you deny it effectively to all. These truths long have been ignored and betrayed on our campuses, to the peril of a free society." In a 2003 moderated chat, he said, "History has taught us that a society that does not respect individual rights, freedom of conscience, and freedom of speech will not long survive as a free society in any form."

=== Human Rights Foundation ===
Halvorssen stepped down as head of FIRE in March 2004 to join its Board of Advisors and announced the creation of the international group Human Rights Foundation. HRF was incorporated in 2005, opening its headquarters in New York City in August 2006. The chair is Yulia Navalnaya. He also founded the Moving Picture Institute.

At the helm of HRF Halvorssen repeatedly lobbied and advocated for the release of Chinese political prisoner Liu Xiaobo. In 2010 Halvorssen was special guest of Liu Xiaobo at the Nobel Prize ceremony awarding the prize to Liu Xiaobo in absentia. Halvorssen is identified as a supporter of Chinese Uyghur leader Rebiya Kadeer and has sharply criticized the Taiwanese Kuomintang government for its banning visits by Kadeer.

Halvorssen was part of a symposium by the American conservative magazine National Review to praise Augusto Pinochet, where Halvorssen was the only one also pointing out his human rights abuses. Halvorssen has criticised several celebrities like Jennifer Lopez, Erykah Baduh and Mariah Carey for accepting payments for their performances in countries governed by authoritarian leaders like Russia.

Halvorssen appears as a frequent critic of Uganda’s president Yoweri Museveni and, in particular, the legislative efforts in Uganda to punish homosexuality with the death penalty.

Halvorssen is a critic of Hugo Chávez. In 2005, he wrote about what he believed was Venezuela’s anti-Semitism and the assault on democracy and individual rights in Latin America. Halvorssen's criticisms have also been directed at U.S. Republicans such as Jack Kemp as well as Democrats including John Conyers and Jose Serrano. Halvorssen led a campaign to expose Chechen president Ramzan Kadyrov’s human rights violations and ultimately created a firestorm for Hollywood actress Hilary Swank after she accepted a cash payment to celebrate Kadyrov’s birthday. In the same manner Halvorssen has exposed payments from dictators to Jennifer Lopez, Erykah Baduh, Mariah Carey, Nelly Furtado, and 50 Cent.

=== Oslo Freedom Forum ===
In 2009, Halvorssen founded a gathering of human-rights campaigners and policymakers called the Oslo Freedom Forum. It has taken place in Oslo annually since then. Wired Magazine blogger David Rowan praised the event for its sessions "if the global human-rights movement were to create its own unified representative body, it would look something like this."

=== Children's Peace Movement ===
Since 2009, Halvorssen is listed as "Patron" of the Children's Peace Movement, On Own Feet. Known as the "Centipede Movement" it is a Czech-based group that facilitates bilateral relations between children and adolescents in Poland, the Czech Republic, Slovakia, Canada, and Norway with children in war-torn countries such as Afghanistan and Iraq. The previous Patron was former Czech president Václav Havel.

== Film ==
In 2006, Halvorssen executive produced Hammer & Tickle, a film about the power of humor, ridicule, and satire as the language of truth in the Soviet Union. The film won Best New Documentary Film at the Zurich Film Festival.

Halvorssen co-produced the film Freedom's Fury which was executive produced by Lucy Liu, Quentin Tarantino, and Andrew Vajna. It premiered at the Tribeca Film Festival. The film relates the story of the uprising against the government that occurred in Hungary in 1956.

Halvorssen is a producer of the film The Singing Revolution, a film about Estonia's peaceful struggle for political independence from Soviet occupation. It has with 18.000 viewers become the most successful documentary film in Estonian box-office history.

Halvorssen produced The Dissident in 2020, a film about the murder of Saudi journalist Jamal Khashoggi, directed by Bryan Fogel.

Filmography

Title	Year	Role
Hammer & Tickle	2006	executive producer
Freedom's Fury	2006	producer
The Singing Revolution	2006	producer
The Sugar Babies	2007	producer
Indoctrinate U	2007	producer
2081	2009	producer
Pups of Liberty	2009	executive producer
U.N. Me	2009	executive producer
State of Control	2016	producer
The Dissident	2020	producer

== Awards and recognition ==
John Strausbaugh described Halvorssen as a "conservative operating in fields more often associated with liberals .. who champions the underdog". Neoconservative columnist James Kirchick described Halvorssen as having a "burning desire to right the countless injustices of this world".

The magazine The Economist pointed out that the Oslo Freedom Forum struck a different tone than organisations like Amnestry International or Human Rights Watch. "Given his conservative ideas, Mr Halvorssen's list of heroes and rogues might differ from that of say, Claudio Cordone, the acting head of Amnesty". It praised their event as being spectacular, competition and "on its way to becoming a human-rights equivalent of the Davos economic forum".

University of Pennsylvania president Judith Rodin honored Halvorssen's achievements by awarding him the Sol Feinstone Award for protecting student speech. In 2018, Halvorssen was awarded the Millennium Candler Justice Prize, honoring leadership in effecting positive social change, presented at the Millennium Gate Museum.

== Publications ==
- Halvorssen, Thor L (1996). Simón Bolívar and the Enlightenment, University of Pennsylvania.

== Notes ==
^{a} Halvorssen Mendoza is known commonly as Thor Halvorssen. Per Venezuelan naming conventions, his full legal name includes both his father's (Halvorssen) and mother's (Mendoza) surnames. His full, legal, Venezuelan name distinguishes him from his father, Thor Halvorssen Hellum. (See Thor Halvorssen - Presidente. The Human Rights Foundation. Retrieved on July 21, 2007. (in Spanish) Also see re: Francisco Usón—Political Prisoner and Prisoner of Conscience. Human Rights Foundation. Retrieved on July 21, 2007.)
