= Bartolomé Tavera Acosta =

Venezuelan journalist and historian

Bartolomé Tavera Acosta (1865–1931) was a Venezuelan journalist and historian. He is considered a pioneer of ethnology and linguistics in modern Venezuela.
