= Carolina Herrera =

Venezuelan fashion designer (born 1939)

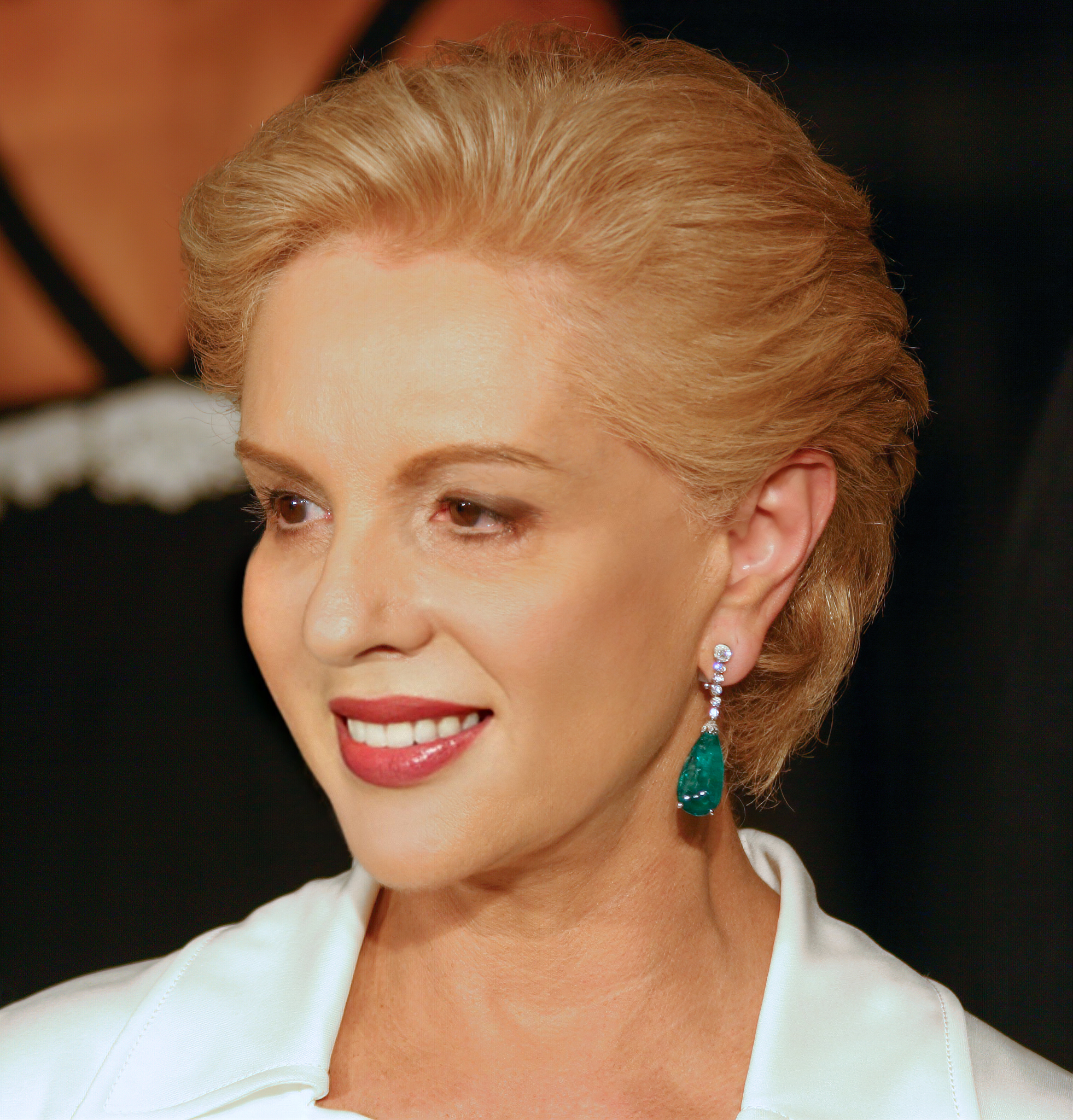
- Herrera in 2007
- Born: María Carolina Josefina Pacanins y Niño; 8 January 1939 (age 87); Caracas, Venezuela
- Citizenship: Venezuela; United States
- Labels: Carolina Herrera New York; CH Carolina Herrera
- Title: Marquise consort of Torre Casa (1975-1992)
- Spouses: Guillermo Behrens (m. 1957; div. 1964); Reinaldo Herrera (m. 1968; died 2025)
- Children: 4
- Parent(s): Guillermo Pacanins Acevedo; María Niño Passios

Carolina Herrera (born María Carolina Josefina Pacanins y Niño, 8 January 1939) is a Venezuelan fashion designer. Known for her personal style, she founded her namesake brand in 1980. Herrera has designed for various First Ladies of the United States, including Jacqueline Onassis, Laura Bush, Michelle Obama, and Melania Trump.

== Early life ==
María Carolina Josefina Pacanins y Niño was born on 8 January 1939 in Caracas, Venezuela. Her father, Guillermo Pacanins Acevedo, was an Air Force officer and her mother, María Cristina Niño Passios, was a former governor of Caracas. Her socialite grandmother introduced her to the world of fashion, taking young Carolina to shows by Balenciaga and buying her outfits at Lanvin and Dior. She has said, "My eye was accustomed to seeing pretty things."

== Early career ==
In 1965, Herrera began her career working as a for Emilio Pucci, a Florentine Marquis and a close family friend. She began working at Pucci's Caracas boutique and moved to New York in 1980. Frequently associating with the New York glitterati such as Andy Warhol, Halston, Diana Vreeland, and Bianca Jagger, she became well known for her dramatic style. She first appeared on the International Best Dressed List in 1972, then was elected to its Hall of Fame in 1980.

== Carolina Herrera ==
Carolina Herrera New York
- Type: Private
- Industry: Luxury Clothing
- Founded: 1980
- Headquarters: New York City; Ourense, Spain
- Key people: Carolina Herrera
- Products: Clothes, perfume
- Website: carolinaherrera.com

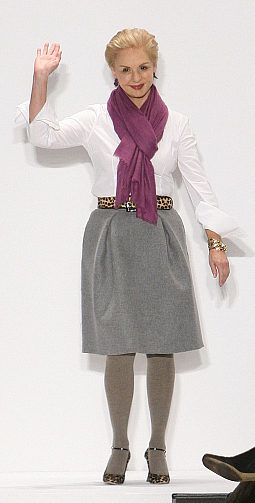
Herrera at a fashion show in 2008

=== First collection ===
Herrera's mentor Diana Vreeland, then Editor-in-Chief of Vogue suggested that she design a clothing line. Herrera founded her clothing line in 1980, and had samples made in Caracas. She debuted her collection at Manhattan's Metropolitan Club to critical acclaim. A well known Park Avenue boutique, Martha's, agreed to showcase her clothing in their prominent windows. Upon this initial success, she returned to Caracas and raised capital to fund a more formal launch. She debuted her first full collection at the Metropolitan Club in April 1981. The show included supermodel Iman and was the first time the venue permitted a fashion show within its walls.

In 1981, her brand received recognition from several key publications, including Women's Wear Daily and Tatler, with particular early attention to her well-designed sleeves. Herrera presents her Ready-to-Wear Collection semiannually at New York Fashion Week.

A few of her most notable clients have included Jacqueline Kennedy Onassis, who asked her to design the dress for her daughter Caroline's wedding, Diana, Duchess of Cadaval, who asked her to design the dress for her marriage with Prince Charles-Philippe of Orléans, Duke of Anjou, and actress Renée Zellweger.

=== Takeover by Puig ===
From 1988, Spanish fragrance company Puig licensed the Carolina Herrera name to develop and market a line of perfumes. In 1995, the firm acquired the Carolina Herrera fashion business, retaining her as Creative Director.

CH, Herrera's bridge line, was discontinued in 1993 before being replaced in 1994 by the Studio line, which in turn was discontinued in 1996. In 2008, the company launched a ready-to-wear brand called CH Carolina Herrera, a lifestyle line that offers a range of products for women, men and children, with a strong emphasis on accessories and leather goods handcrafted in Spain. The brand is licensed by Sociedad Textil Lonia, a privately owned company from Galicia, Spain. Each label is run as a separate company and has separate offices.

As of 2011, her daughters Carolina Jr. and Patricia Lansing participated in the creative direction and design. As of 2012, there were 18 Carolina Herrera and CH Carolina Herrera boutiques in the world, and her lines were carried in 280 stores in 104 countries. In February 2016, it was reported by WWD that the fragrance side of the business had more than 25,000 points of sale across the globe while the CH brand included 129 freestanding stores.

For their advertising campaigns, the Carolina Herrera and CH Carolina Herrera brands have been working with photographers including Miles Aldridge (1997), Arthur Elgort (1997), Patrick Demarchelier (1997, 2011), Terry Richardson (2004), Mario Sorrenti (2007), Greg Kadel (2014), Mario Testino (2015–2018), Brigitte Lacombe (2023) and François Halard (2024).

In late 2016, the company filed a lawsuit in the New York Supreme Court seeking to block designer Laura Kim – a consultant who had been offered to succeed Carolina Herrera as creative director – from joining Oscar de la Renta. By early 2017, the two brands and Kim reached a settlement, allowing Kim to take up her role as co-creative director with Fernando Garcia.

In 2018, Herrera showed her last line for her eponymous brand and handed creative directorship of the brand over to Wes Gordon.

=== Fragrances ===
By 2014, there were 15 core fragrances under the Carolina Herrera, CH and 212 Carolina Herrera brands. In 2016, Herrera released Good Girl, her new women's fragrance and her biggest fragrance launch in 14 years; Karlie Kloss was named the face of the fragrance.

=== Accessories ===
From 1994 to 1996, Herrera had a licensed leather goods and scarf line with Swoboda International. The line was subsequently produced in-house.

=== Eyewear ===
For the design, production and global distribution of sunglasses and optical frames, Carolina Herrera has been working with licensing partners Indo (1997), De Rigo Vision (2011–2021) and Safilo (since 2022).

== Other activities ==
Since 2004, Herrera has been a member of the board of directors of jewelry designer Mimi So, and since 1999 on the board of the CFDA.

== Recognition ==
In 2008, Herrera was awarded the Geoffrey Beene Lifetime Achievement Award from the Council of Fashion Designers of America, and "Womenswear Designer of the Year" in 2004. Herrera is a recipient of The International Center in New York's Award of Excellence as well as Spain's Gold Medal for Merit in the Fine Arts, which was presented to her in 2002 by King Juan Carlos I. She was awarded the Gold Medal of the Queen Sofía Spanish Institute in 1997.

She received the Fashion Group International Superstar Award, the Style Awards Designer of the Year in 2012 and the "Mercedes-Benz Presents" title for her 2011 collection. She has been on the cover of Vogue seven times.

In 2005, she received the Golden Plate Award of the American Academy of Achievement during the International Achievement Summit in New York City.

In 2014, she earned the 2014 Couture Council Award for Artistry of Fashion.

CH Designs

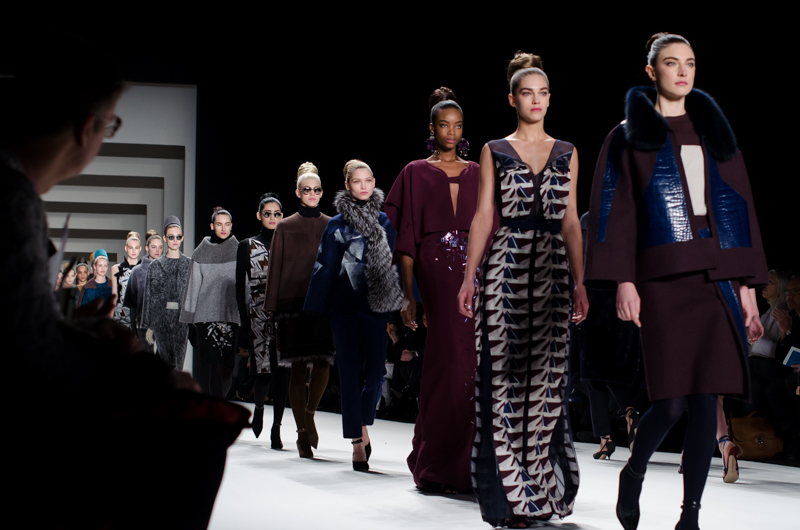

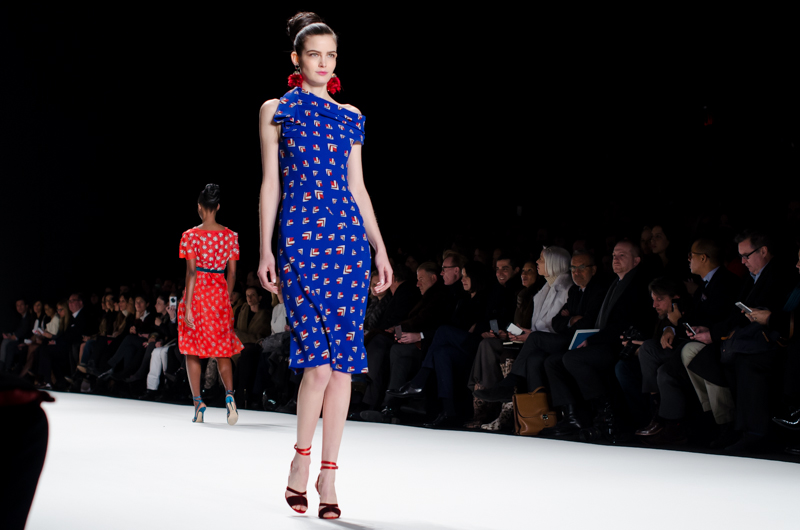

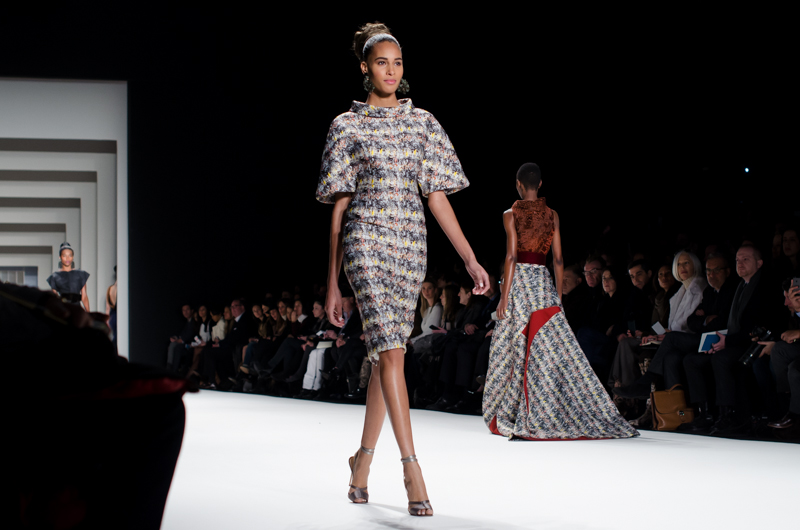

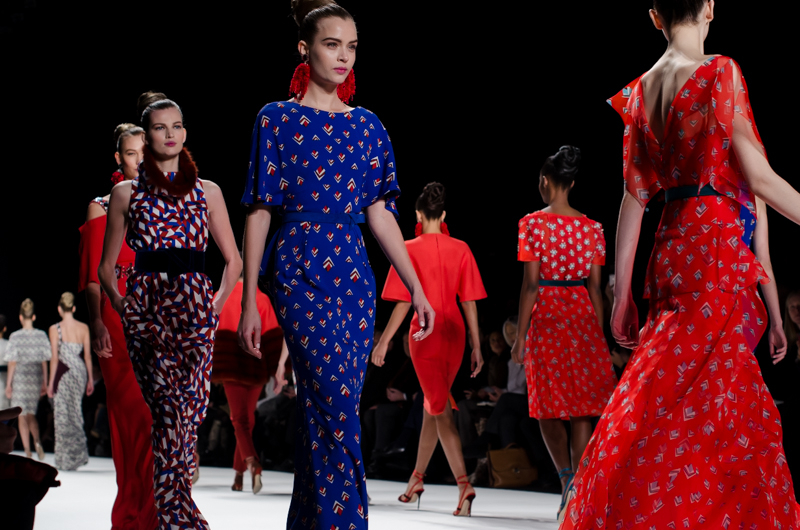

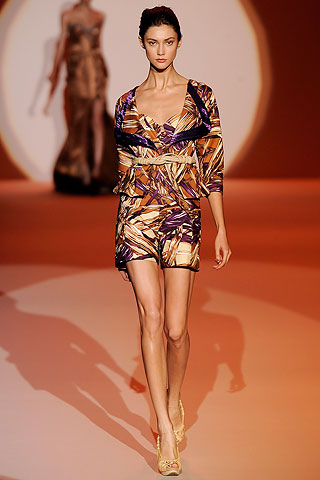

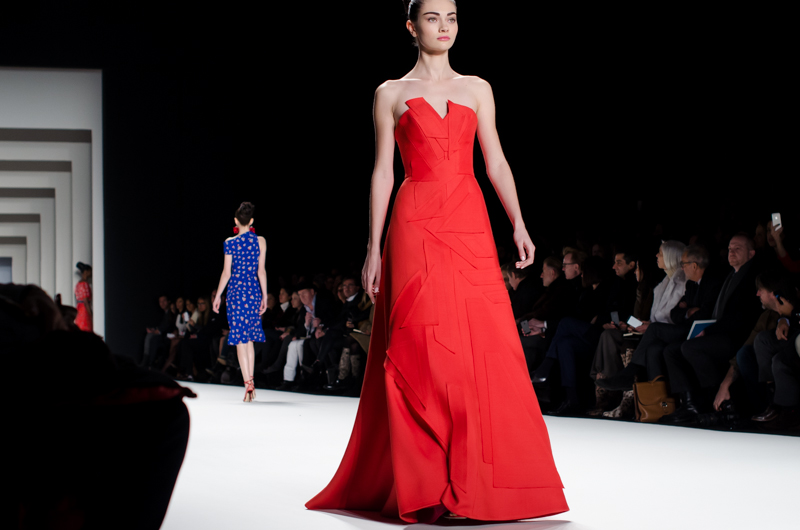

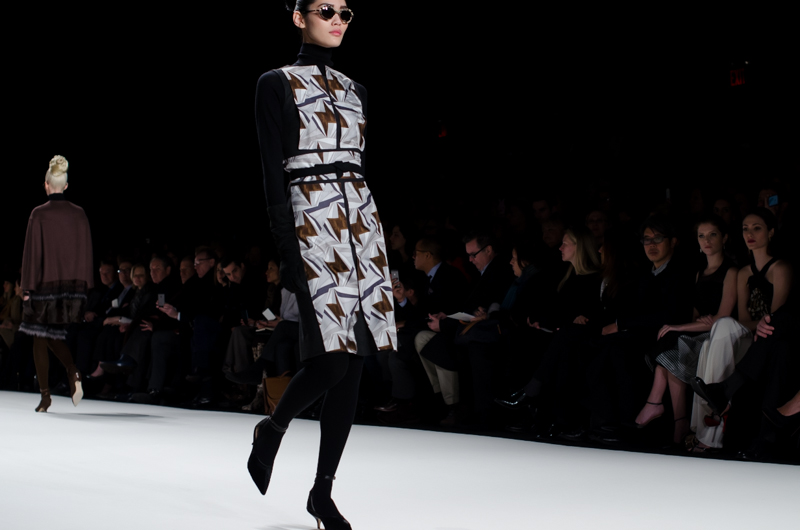

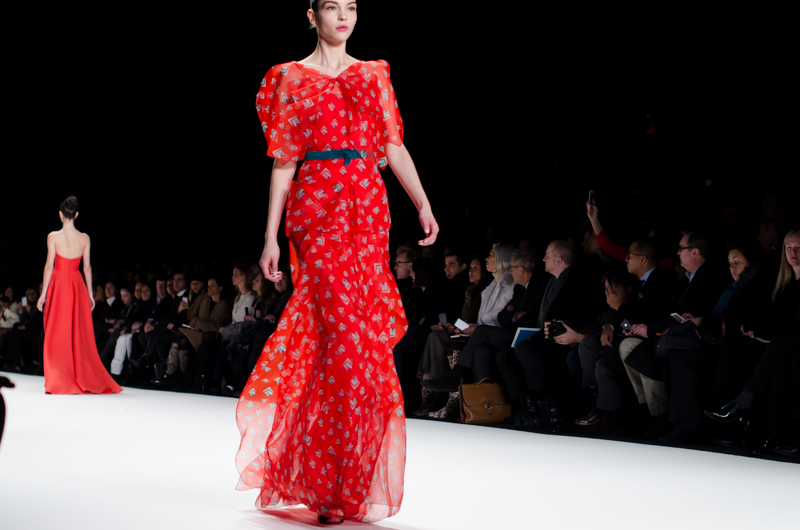

== Personal life ==
In 1957, at the age of 18, Herrera married Guillermo Behrens Tello, a Venezuelan landowner and fifth cousin of Gustavo J. Vollmer. Before their eventual divorce in 1964, they became the parents of two daughters:

- Mercedes Carolina Behrens Pacanins
- Ana Luisa Behrens Pacanins, who married developer Luis Paraud Carpena, the son of Maj. Gen. Fernando Paraud of Madrid, in 1989.

In 1968, in Caracas, she married Reinaldo Herrera Guevara (1933-2025), who had inherited the Spanish title The 5th Marquis of Torre Casa in 1962 upon his father's death. Reinaldo was the host of Buenos Días, a Venezuelan morning-television news program. By marriage, Carolina held the title The Marquise consort of Torre Casa, until it was retracted in 1992, as an official statement from the Spanish court stated that another claimant had been located. Her husband is a special-projects editor for Vanity Fair magazine. Together, they have two daughters, and six grandchildren, including:

- Carolina Adriana Herrera Pacanins (b. 1969), who married Miguel Báez. Their offspring are Olympia de la Concepción Báez Herrera, who's studying fashion in Paris, Miguel Báez Herrera, and Atalanta Báez Herrera. Carolina Adriana. is currently dating Pedro de Noronha.
- Patricia Cristina Herrera Pacanins, who married Gerrit Livingston Lansing Jr., a son of Suydam Rosengarten Lansing and Gerrit Livingston Lansing Sr. (a descendant of Robert Livingston), in 2002. The two have three children together:
  - Carolina B Lansing Herrera, a student at Chapman University and a debutante in the 2025 Le Bal des Débutantes, Gerrit Lansing Herrera, and Magnus Lansing Herrera.

In 2009, Herrera became a naturalized United States citizen.

== See also ==
- List of fashion designers
