= Francisco Massiani =

Venezuelan writer and painter (1944–2019)

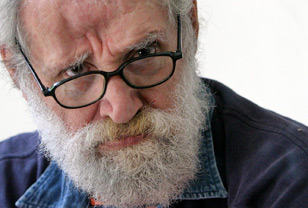
- Born: 2 April 1944; Caracas, Venezuela
- Died: 1 April 2019 (aged 74); Caracas, Venezuela
- Occupations: writer, painter
- Writing career
- Notable work: Piedra de mar (1968)
- Notable awards: National Prize for Literature (2012)

Francisco Massiani (2 April 1944 – 1 April 2019) was a Venezuelan writer and painter.

His first novel, Piedra de mar has been a bestseller since its publication. It's a Bildungsroman of a middle class teenager in Caracas.

Massiani, won the Municipal Prize of Prose in 1998, and in 2005, the V annual contest of the Fundación para la Cultura Urbana (Foundation for the Urban Culture), for the storybook Florencio y los pajaritos de Angelina, su mujer.

In 2006, he published his first book of poetry.

In 2012 he won the National Prize for Literature, as a recognition to his entire body of work.

== List of works ==
Novel

- Piedra de mar (1968)
- Los tres mandamientos de Misterdoc Fonegal (1976)

Short Story

- Fiesta de campo/Renate o la vida siempre como en un comienzo (1965; published in 2008)
- Las primeras hojas de la noche (1970)
- El llanero solitario tiene la cabeza pelada como un cepillo de dientes (1975)
- Relatos (1990)
- Con agua en la piel (1998)
- Florencio y los pajaritos de Angelina, su mujer (2006)

Poetry

- 2006 Antología
- 2007 Señor de la ternura
- 2011 Corsarios

Anthologies

- 16 cuentos latinoamericanos : antología para jóvenes, Coedición Latinoamericana, 1992, ISBN 978-968-494-064-2
