= Julio Herrera Velutini =

Venezuelan banker (born 1971)

Julio Martín Herrera Velutini
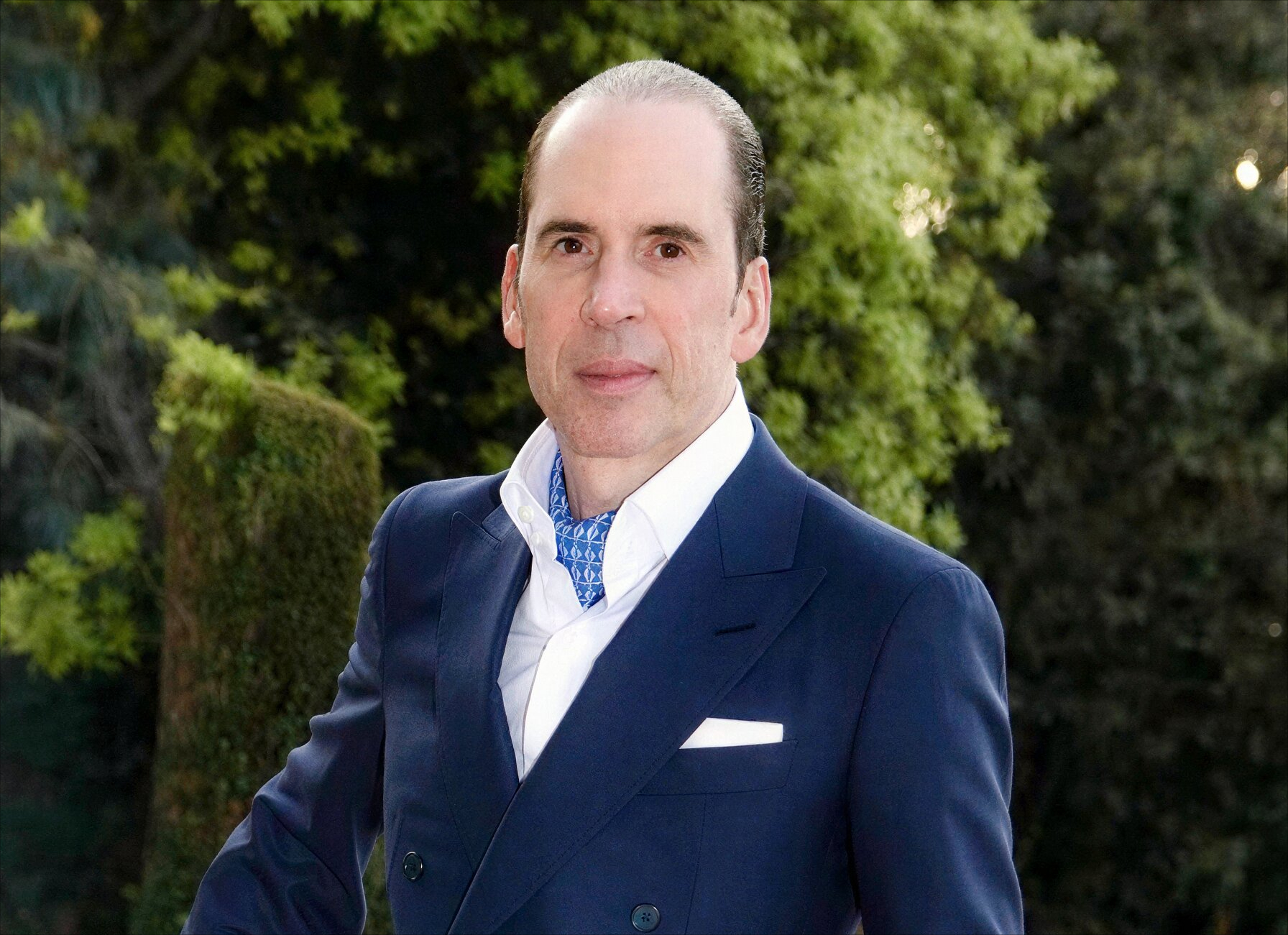
- Born: December 15, 1971 (age 54); Caracas, Venezuela
- Education: The American School in London; The American School In Switzerland; Central University of Venezuela
- Occupation: Banker
- Family: José Antonio Velutini (great-great-grandfather); José Herrera Uslar (grandfather); Reinaldo Herrera (second cousin)
- Website: https://www.houseofherrera.com/

Julio Martín Herrera Velutini (born 15 December 1971) is a Venezuelan billionaire businessman and founder of Britannia Financial Group.

== Early life and family ==
Velutini was educated at The American School in England (UK), La Scuola Americana in Svizzera (Switzerland), and at the Central University of Venezuela (graduated in 1990). With more than 30 years of experience in the world of banking and finance, Julio Herrera Velutini represents the seventh generation of bankers in his family.

The Herrera Velutini family is one of the largest landowners in Venezuela. Its history dates back to 14th century Spain in the Kingdom of Castile, where it began with Pedro de Herrera y Rojas, Lord of Ampudia and the House of Herrera, to consolidate a dynasty of landowners, conquerors, merchants and later, bankers with influence in Spain, the Canary Islands, Latin America, Germany, and England. It has also marked its influence in trade and fashion in Spain, North and Latin America, and more recently in the United Kingdom and other countries. Most of the family wealth comes from the inheritance of the family's business and activities in the field of finance, banking and real estate since the 14th century. The Velutini side of the family originates in Corsica (where many prominent Venezuelans immigrated from) and Velutini’s great-great-grandfather José Antonio Velutini was an early Venezuelan statesman and military leader.

== Career ==
In the early 1990s, Velutini began working at the Caracas Stock Exchange with Multinvest Casa de Bolsa, where he was a member of the board of directors until 1998. That same year he became CEO of Transban Investments Corp, becoming one of its main shareholders and senior manager of companies such as Kia Motors of Venezuela, BMW de Venezuela, BBO Financial Services, Transporte de Valores Bancarios de Venezuela (securities transport company), Bolivar Banco Universal, where at the age of 29 he was Chairman of the Board of Directors.

In the early 2000s, he acquired companies such as Caja Caracas Casa de Bolsa and IBG Trading (USA). Until February 2009, he was Chairman of the Board of Directors of Banco Real, and Banreal Holding (Spain), which he subsequently sold due to economic and political instability and the deterioration of Latin America; he also held management positions in Banco Activo Banco Comercial. He also created the Bancredito Foundation and Bancredito Financial Services. In 2016, the Bancrédito Group expanded with the acquisition of Consultiva Wealth Management an investment advisory firm registered and regulated by the Securities and Exchange Commission (SEC), located in Puerto Rico and New York..In 2022, Britannia Financial Group sponsored the Platinum Jubilee Pageant, which marked the 70th anniversary of Queen Elizabeth II's accession to the throne.

== Political funding and legal issues ==
Between 2019 and 2022, Velutini donated over £500,000 to the UK Conservative Party through his company Britannia Financial Group Limited.

In August 2022, Herrera Velutini was accused of illegally financing former governor of Puerto Rico Wanda Vázquez Garced's election campaign, allegedly in exchange for removal of a regulator who was investigating Velutini's bank. This was based on a quantitative and qualitative survey commissioned in 2020 to the private company City Group London to study the pre-electoral panorama in Puerto Rico. Vázquez Garced's lawyer stated that the survey that led to the indictment of both the banker and Vázquez Garced was not prepared for her benefit. Upon learning of the indictment, Herrera Velutini voluntarily presented himself to the authorities and pleaded not guilty.

In August 2025, prosecutors dismissed the original charges of conspiracy, federal program bribery, and honest services wire fraud, after Herrera Velutini pleaded guilty to a misdemeanor violation of United States campaign finance law.

In December 2024 and July 2025, Herrera Velutini's daughter, Isabela Herrera, contributed $2.5 million and $1 million, respectively, to MAGA Inc.

In January 2026, President Donald Trump granted full and unconditional pardons to Herrera Velutini, former Puerto Rico governor Wanda Vázquez Garced, and former FBI agent Mark Rossini. On 16 January, a White House official described the case as "an example of political prosecution". A White House official told CBS News that the donations were unrelated to the pardon.

Later that month, the federal court dismissed the proceedings against the three defendants after they accepted the pardons.

On October 20, 2026, the New York Times reported that Herrera Velutini's daughter Isabela used Concord Partners, a company she established in Florida in October 2025, to hire Alina Habba as general counsel for "$10 million a year for four years along with a range of bonuses" totaling $50 million guaranteed. Habba denied any role in securing Herrera Velutini’s pardon, saying that her employment had been vetted and disclosed to the Department of Justice. The White House also denied any connection between her employment and the pardon. Habba began working at Concord Partners on January 1, 2026 and Herrera Velutini received a pardon a few weeks later.

== See also ==
- List of people granted executive clemency in the second Trump presidency
