= Luis Emilio Velutini =

Venezuelan businessman and investor

Luis Emilio Velutini (born January 8, 1953, in Caracas) is a businessman and investor of the Latin American financial and real estate market. A descendant of Vicente José María Velutini, an immigrant from Corsica who arrived in Venezuela during the 1830s and helped rebuild the Chaguaramal El Batey, a town who gave origin to Zaraza, Guárico; he is the third of five children born to son of Guillermo José Velutini and Josefina Urbina. He married Olga Del Coromoto Manzo (1953), with whom he has three children: Emiliana, born on December 4, 1978; Daniela, born on September 14, 1980; and Luis Emilio, born on June 17, 1987. He is a great-nephew of José Antonio Velutini, third cousin of Juan Liscano and half-third cousin of Leopoldo López, Thor Halvorssen (human rights activist) and Julio Herrera Velutini.

== Professional life ==
The Velutini Agüero family group participated in the construction of projects like the Club Playa Azul and the Lagartijo Dam.

He founded the Aguasal Enterprises Group in 1976 together with his eldest brother Guillermo José Velutini Urbina and motivated the development of the Hotel Fiesta Inn Aguasal and Club Aguasal.

During the 90s, he founded Fondo de Valores Inmobiliarios along with Luis García Montoya, Nelson Ortiz, Luis Carlos Serra Carmona and various local banks.

In the year 1994, he founded the consulting company Velutini & Asociados Asesoria Financiera along with his cousin Horacio Velutini Sosa. In 1995 Velutini & Asociados acquires control of the company Fondo de Valores Inmobiliarios, with the approval of the National Stock Exchange Commission and its registration in the Caracas Stock Exchange.

In 1996, he achieves the association of the Argentinean real estate group IRSA and the known investor George Soros with the Fondo de Valores Inmobiliarios, starting a process of real estate assets acquisitions and reorienting the business towards the rent of office spaces in Caracas for corporation uses. In 1998, he registers the shares of the Fondo de Valores Inmobiliarios in the Level I ADR program of the Bank of New York in the NYSE.

For the year 2000 Luis Emilio Velutini incorporates Equity International Properties (EIP) as a strategic partner of the Fondo de Valores Inmobiliarios, which is an Investment Fund led by the North American investor Samuel Zell, founder and shareholder of Equity Office Properties (EOP) and Equity Residencial Properties.

In the year 2002, he directs the Fondo de Valores Inmobiliarios towards the Mall business, due to the success of the positioning, management and operation of the Centro San Ignacio in Caracas. He also inaugurated the Tolón Fashion Mall the commercial and offices mall Paseo El Hatillo-La Lagunita.

In August 2010, he inaugurated alongside President Leonel Fernández, "Blue Mall Santo Domingo" in Dominican Republic, a commercial complex located in Santo Domingo.

Right now, Luis Emilio Velutini continues being the President of Velutini & Asociados and the Fondo de Valores Inmobiliarios, and develops Blue Mall St. Maarten and Blue Mall Punta Cana.

== Corporate social responsibility ==
He is the President of the Fondo de Valores Inmobiliarios Foundation, which, since its creation in the year 2003, has improved the quality of life of those with more needs through the financing of social investment projects. Working directly with the communities, its training programs, the support to its workers and the promotion of a very willing group of volunteers, its added to the donations that Luis Emilio Velutini makes to the Non Government Organizations that support minority groups.
