= José Antonio Velutini =

Venezuelan statesman, military man and politician

José Antonio Velutini Ron
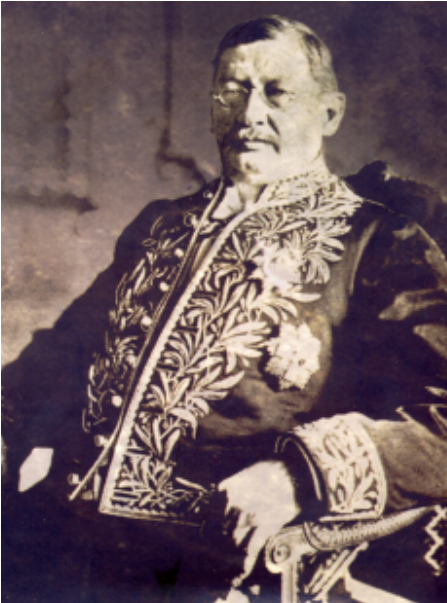

Second Vice President of Venezuela
- In office April 1904 – 1908
- President: Cipriano Castro

Personal details
- Born: José Antonio Velutini Ron; February 20, 1844 State of Venezuela
- Spouse: Clementina Couturier
- Children: 10
- Parent(s): Vicente Velutini; María Ron
- Relatives: Juan Liscano (grandson); Luis Emilio Velutini (great-nephew); Julio Herrera Velutini (great-great-grandson); Leopoldo López (great-great-nephew); Thor Halvorssen (great-great-nephew)

José Antonio Velutini Ron (February 20, 1844 in Chaguaramal de Perales -today Zaraza-, Venezuela – November 8, 1912 in Caracas) was a military man, politician, diplomat, and a Venezuelan statesman. He held positions in Congress, was state president, ambassador, minister and vice president between 1871 and 1912. He received numerous awards for his political and military achievements.

== Biography ==
His family of Corsican origins moved to Barcelona in 1854. José Antonio studied in France between 1858 and 1863. On his return to Venezuela he began his public career under the protection of the Monagas family.

In 1871 he assumed the Barcelona state presidency. He was public credit and development minister during the second and third presidencies of Antonio Guzmán Blanco, respectively. He was appointed Commander in Chief of the Armies of the Republic on October 7, 1892 by Joaquín Crespo. He was the minister of finance in 1893.

He was the interior minister of Cipriano Castro and commander of government forces in the early stages of the Liberating Revolution. After the victorious campaign of the Castro government against the rebels, he was Plenipotentiary Minister for Debt Negotiations with various European nations and a Venezuelan ambassador in France and Britain.

He was Second Vice President of Venezuela from April 1904 to 1908. Among his descendants are several prominent Venezuelan bankers and financiers, such as Julio C. Velutini Couturier, Andrés Velutini Ruíz and poet Juan Liscano.
