= Klusemann =

Klusemann is a German surname. Notable people with the surname include:

- Georg Klusemann (1942–1981), German painter and illustrator
- Caterina Klusemann (born 1973), documentary filmmaker, Georg's daughter

== See also ==
- Klusmann
- Klussmann
