= Georg Klusemann =

German painter (1942–1981)

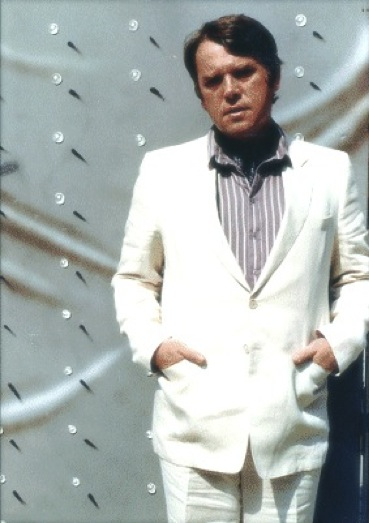
Klusemann in front of one of his works at an exhibition 1980 in Xanten, Germany

Georg Klusemann (13 May 1942 – 4 May 1981) was a prolific artist and a children's book author. Although he died at age 38, Klusemann left behind an extensive body of work.

== Art ==
Klusemann belongs to a group of artists such as Werner Gilles, Eduard Bargheer and Gerhard Hoehme, whose work reflects their adoption of Italian culture. He studied at the Kunstakademie Düsseldorf under Teo Otto, from 1962 to 1968, with Katharina Sieverding and Jörg Immendorff. After extensive travels to Spain, the Orient and Latin America, his work gained a clear original profile. Impulses from contemporary European art can be traced to Joan Miró, Victor Vasarely, Giorgio Morandi or Domenico Gnoli, to surrealism or op art. But the impulses are transformed and integrated into a unique concept that cannot be associated to any known current in art. Critics have called him "Baroque" (Joachim Burmeister), "Indefatigable and fantastic" (Vittorio Sgarbi), "Arcimboldesque" (Heiner Stachelhaus), "an oscillator between abstraction and realism, narrative and representation, elusiveness and application" (Dieter Ronte), or a "legitimator of computer art" (Giampiero Pavanati). Patrick Waldberg, the major biographer of surrealism, wrote of Klusemann's work that it is "full of waving drapes, flying boxes, objects coming up in the air, swelling balloons, windows bursting open, instruments coming to life and all this according to a harmony beyond logic". Klusemann's biographer Hans M. Schmidt called him an "individualist and a loner of unusual capacities." "The things recognized become uncertain, the apparent truth becomes deception," Hannes Hardering writes of Klusemann's paintings. Klaus Honnef wrote about looking at his works: "The viewer is forced to question his viewpoint, to change it. To decipher the intricacies of these images one must learn to accept ones judgement as always temporary and never ultimate."

Klusemann worked as a painter, drawer, etcher, and author of children books. His oeuvre comprises at least 350 canvases, 330 etchings, hundreds of drawings, gouaches and watercolors, as well as poems and fables. His children books were published by Beltz & Gelberg and Peter Hammer Verlag and are still part of school curricula in German elementary schools because of their playful and imaginative approach to intercultural communication. After several monographs about his work and more than 20 catalogues, the complete works were published in two volumes by Hatje Cantz Verlag in 2000.

Klusemann's paintings and etchings have been the object of more than 40 exhibitions in France, Spain, Italy, Germany, Venezuela and the U.S.A. The major retrospectives have taken place at the Museum Folkwang in Essen, the Kunstverein für die Rheinlande und Westfalen in Düsseldorf, at the Goethe-Institut New York, at the Bagatti Valsecchi Museum in Milan and at the Museo d'arte contemporanea Villa Croce in Genua. His works are part of the collections of the Metropolitan Museum of Art in New York, the Museum of Modern Art in New York, the Albertina in Vienna, the Rheinische Landesmuseum in Bonn, the Museo d'arte contemporanea Villa Croce in Genua and the Museo de Bellas Artes in Caracas, as well as of numerous private collections.

In 1994, a children's opera based on his Die wundersame Reise nach Esmir was first played at the Ruhrfestspielhaus in Recklinghausen.

== Personal life ==
He was born in an area of Essen called An der Kluse (near Klusenkapelle), below Villa Hügel.

In 1968, he met Elena Hochman-Klusemann, a Jewish sociologist raised in Venezuela. Elena's mother was a Holocaust survivor who struggled with her daughter's marriage to a German. They moved to Tuscany, where Elena later sank into depression and Klusemann turned to alcohol. He started to vomit blood three months before his death. Klusemann died in Pisa in 1981.

He is the subject of the documentary Georg by his daughter Caterina Klusemann, completed in 2008 for Arte/ZDF. In the film, several friends and fellow artists, including painter Ulrich Erben, writer Ingrid Bachér (who had written that "there was something magnificent about him, nothing small, narrow, he overflowed with life"), writer Hermann Schulz, and his publisher Hans-Joachim Gelberg, as well as his wife, reconstruct his brief but intense life.
