= Katharina Sieverding =

German photographer

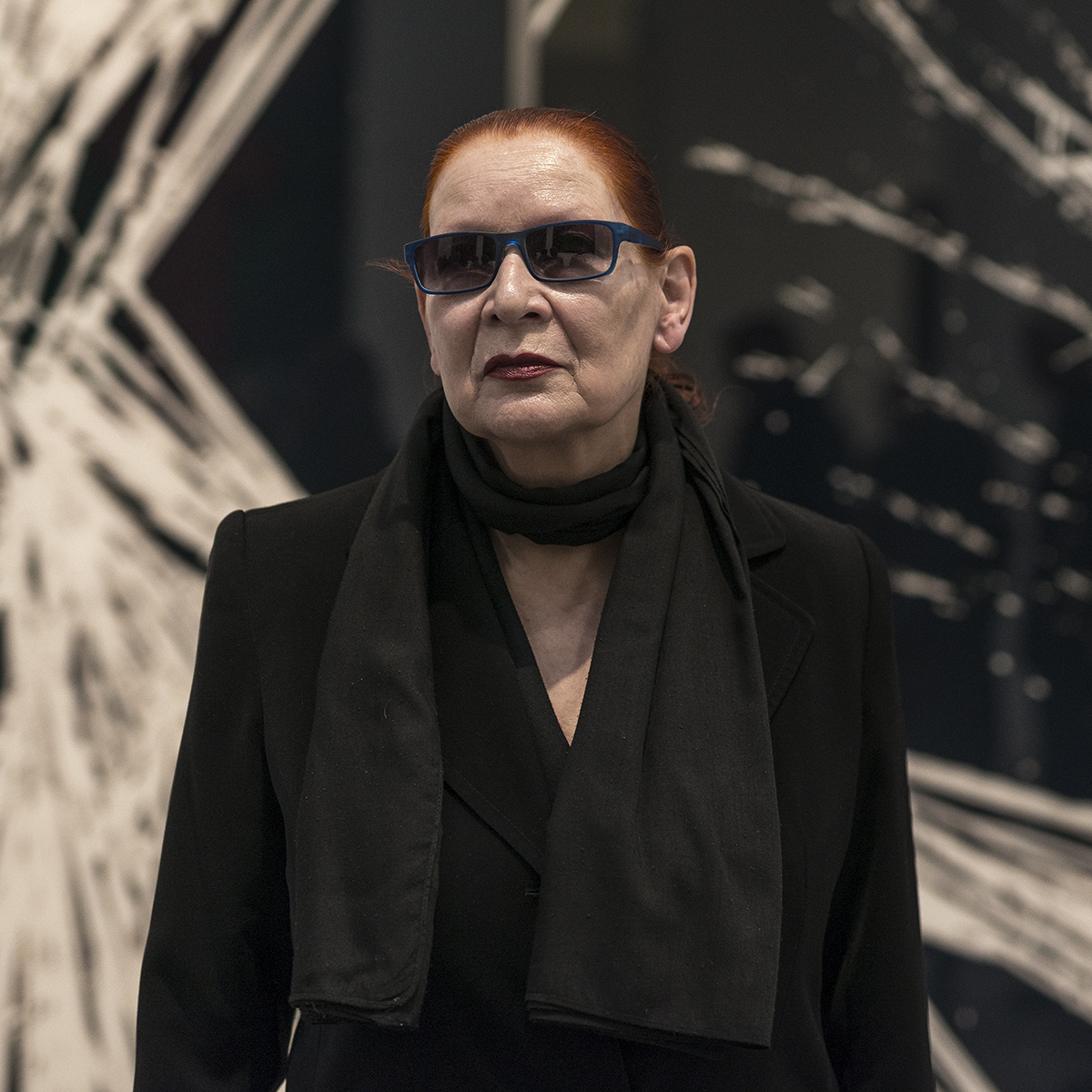
Katharina Sieverding in her exhibition "Art and Chapter" in the Bundeskunsthalle Bonn (2017)

Katharina Sieverding (born 16 November 1941) is a German photographer known for her self-portraiture. Sieverding lives and works in Berlin and Düsseldorf. She is a professor emeritus at the University of the Arts, Berlin.

== Early life and education ==
Sieverding was born in Prague, in the then Protectorate of Bohemia and Moravia, to German parents. She grew up in the Ruhr region. She began studying art at the Kunstakademie Düsseldorf in 1964. There she started studying stage design alongside Georg Klusemann and Jörg Immendorff under Teo Otto, but later joined the sculpture class taught by Joseph Beuys in 1967. Her fellow students included Blinky Palermo and Imi Knoebel. Between 1971 and 1974, she was part of the film class at the Kunstakademie. In 1976, she took part in the Independent Study Program at the Whitney Museum of American Art.

== Work ==
Sieverding's works consist of self-portraiture and most have an abstract quality. She uses the techniques of silhouette, contrast, and extreme close-up to make the photograph more revealing of herself. She tinted all the prints in one 1969 series a deep scarlet, and for another painted her face gold. Her work often makes statements about society and the individual, such as showing the familiarity of the self and the distance of others. Often she puts multiple portraits together in one piece. Each portrait fills the frame in a way to show the presence of self.

Maton (1969–1972), one of the first photographic series, comprises composite portraits of the artist staged in a photo booth. These portraits resurface in a series of 16 larger-than-life photographs of Sieverding in Stauffenberg-Block, from 1969, the title of which refers to German officer Claus Schenk von Stauffenberg, who made a failed attempt to assassinate Adolf Hitler in 1944. Viewed in sequence, the expressions of the faces remain fixed—mouth closed, unsmiling, eyes tilted slightly upward. Experimenting with the medium, Sieverding solarized the silver gelatin originals and then used a red filter to tint the images. In the 56-part series Die Sonne um Mitternacht schauen (To Look at the Sun at Midnight) (1973) shows individual portraits of the artist's face painted in shimmering gold dust. Another work, Motorkamera (1973/1974) consists of 336 individual black and white portraits of Sieverding and her partner Klaus Mettig engaged in a series of intimate postures. This is the departure point for another seminal series from this period, Transformer (1973), which features large format projections of multi-layered androgynous portraits. A later large-scale multi-media installation, Untitled (Ultramarine) (1993), is a series of eight self-portraits, each having three parts, united by a vertical band of electric blue pigment.

Since 1975, Sieverding, along with Mettig, has also made political statements through her photography using both German and American history as the basis. During 1976–78, the artist traveled to China and America, accumulating visual propaganda to further explore the symbolic communications at play in mass-marketed imagery and text. One example is the monumental four-part photograph IX, taken on a New York City rooftop during Sieverding's one-year stay in the city in 1977. In this photo, Sieverding is enveloped in a sea of black, one hand grasping a glass, and the other placed atop her head. Referencing the notorious blackout in New York on the summer night of July 13, 1977, the words "THE GREAT WHITE WAY GOES BLACK" are printed across her face.

Her work has frequently triggered debates on contemporary society, politics, social and cultural issues, one example being her poster installations Deutschland wird Deutscher of 1993, which she did in collaboration with Klaus Biesenbach, and Die Pleite of 2005 in Greater Berlin. In 1992, Sieverding was commissioned to design the memorial to the parliamentarians persecuted in the Weimar Republic. It is on display at the Reichstag in Berlin. In 1995, she organized the lecture series "Never mind the nineties" together with Klaus Biesenbach, who studied freie Kunst at the HDK (Berlin University of the Arts) with Katharina Sieverding from 1993 to 1998.

While a visiting professor at the China Academy of Art in Hangzhou/Shanghai, Sieverding produced the film Shanghai (2002–2003). The film, consisting of two five-minute loops, documents the street life in and around the city.

=== Notable photographs ===
- “The Great White Way Goes Black”
- ”Stauffenberg-Block”
- ”Motorkamera”
- ”XVII”
- ”Die Sonne um Mitternacht schauen”
- ”Untitled (Ultramarine)”
- ”Maton”

=== Films ===
- ”Life-Death”
- ”Beijing, Yanan, Xian, Luoyang”
- ”Shanghai”

== Major exhibitions ==
Sieverding took part in documenta 5 in 1972, documenta 6 in 1977 and documenta 7 in 1982, Kassel, and in 1997 she exhibited in the German pavilion at the Venice Biennale. Her solo exhibitions include: Deutsche Guggenheim, Berlin (1998); Stedelijk Museum, Amsterdam (1998); Kunstsammlung NRW, Düsseldorf (1997–98); Kunst-Werke Institute for Contemporary Art, Berlin (1993); Neue Nationalgalerie, Berlin (1992). Collective exhibition: "Objectivités – La photographie à Düsseldorf" – Musée d'Art Moderne de la Ville de Paris (2008) C Les Rencontres d'Arles, France (2010). In the United States, her works have been shown at Solomon R. Guggenheim Museum, New York; Andy Warhol Museum, Pittsburgh; Dallas Museum of Art, Dallas; Walker Art Center, Minneapolis; and ICA, Boston. In 2004 and 2005, New York's MoMA PS1 and Kunst-Werke Berlin presented an extensive survey of her work.

== References and links ==
=== Sources ===
- Fricke, Harald. "Intimacy on a Large Scale: A Conversation with Katharina Sieverding" db artmag.
- Katharina Sieverding on re-title.com
