= Klussmann =

Klussmann is a surname. Notable people with the surname include:

- Friedel Klussmann (1896–1986), American prominent member of San Francisco society
- Sebastian Klussmann (born 1989), German quiz player

== See also ==
- Klusemann
- Klusmann
