= Grugapark =

Public park in Essen, Germany

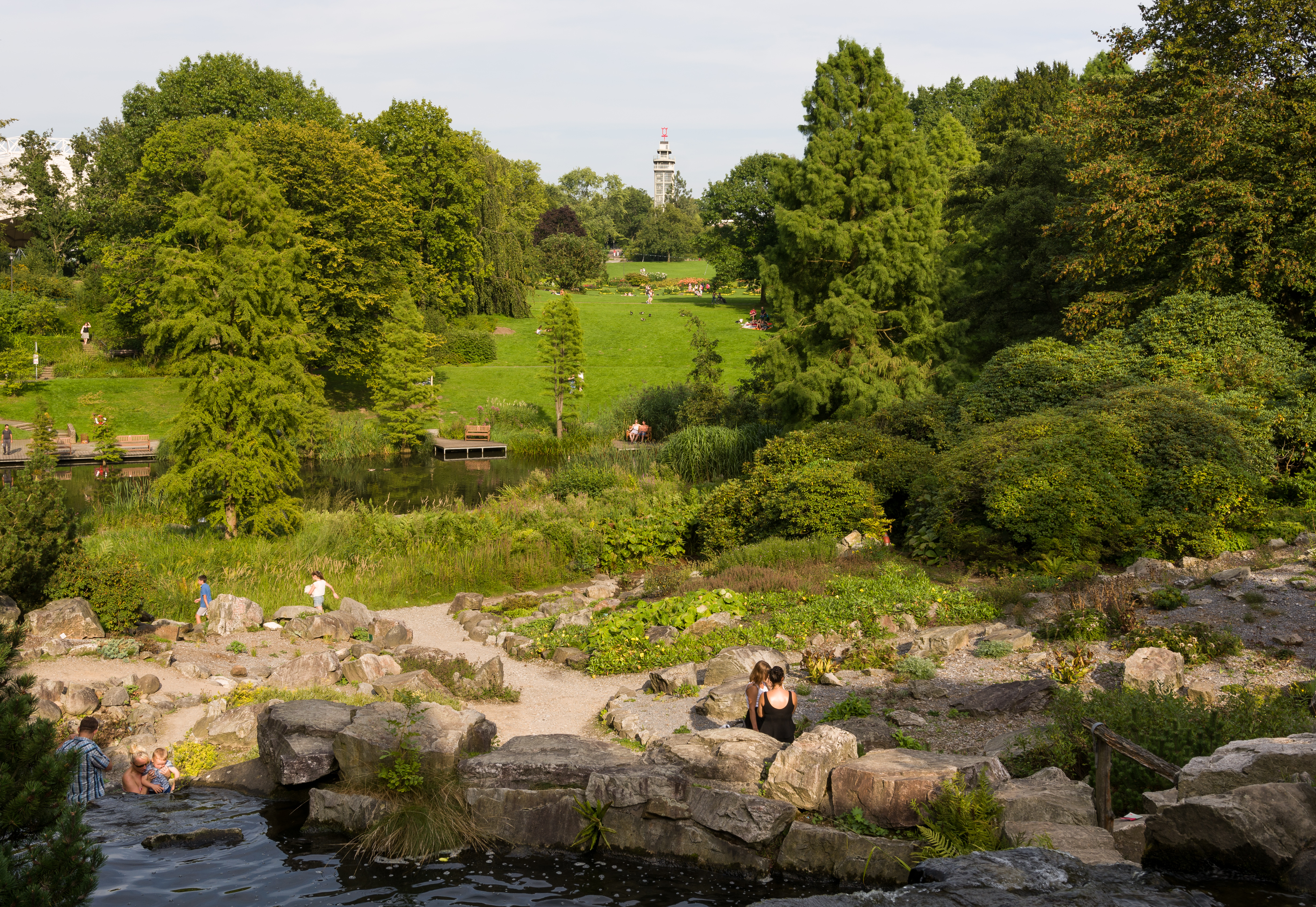
- View over the center of Grugapark
- Interactive map of Grugapark
- Type: Urban park
- Location: Essen, Germany
- Coordinates: 51.428°N 6.987°E
- Area: 65 hectares (0.65 km^{2})

The Grugapark is a central park in the city of Essen, North Rhine-Westphalia, Germany. It was first opened in 1929 as the first Big Ruhrland Horticultural Exhibition (German: GRUGA — Große Ruhrländische Gartenbau-Ausstellung). Adjacent to the Grugapark is the Grugahalle concert hall and the Messe Essen exhibition centre.

== History ==
During WWII, 35 Russian forced labourers were killed by the Gestapo at a place called Montagsloch.

== Gallery ==
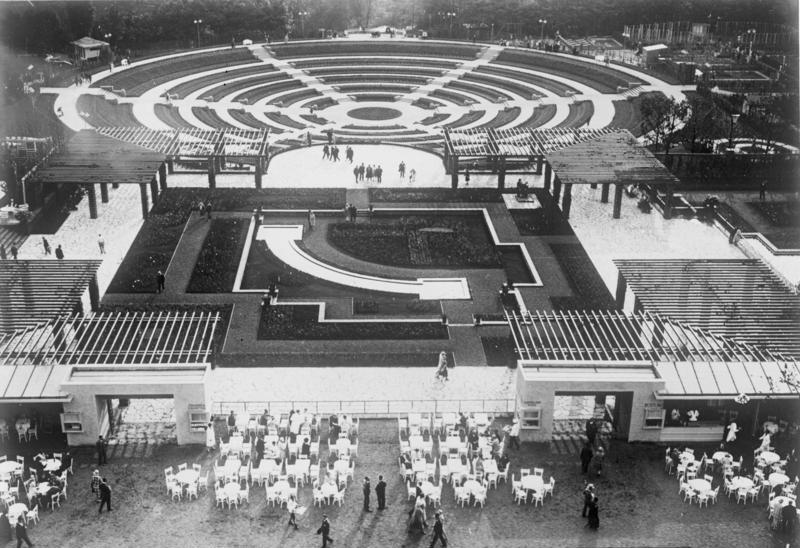
Opening of the Gruga in 1929 with a view from the Radio Tower: Dahlia arena behind, pergola garden and milk restaurant in front

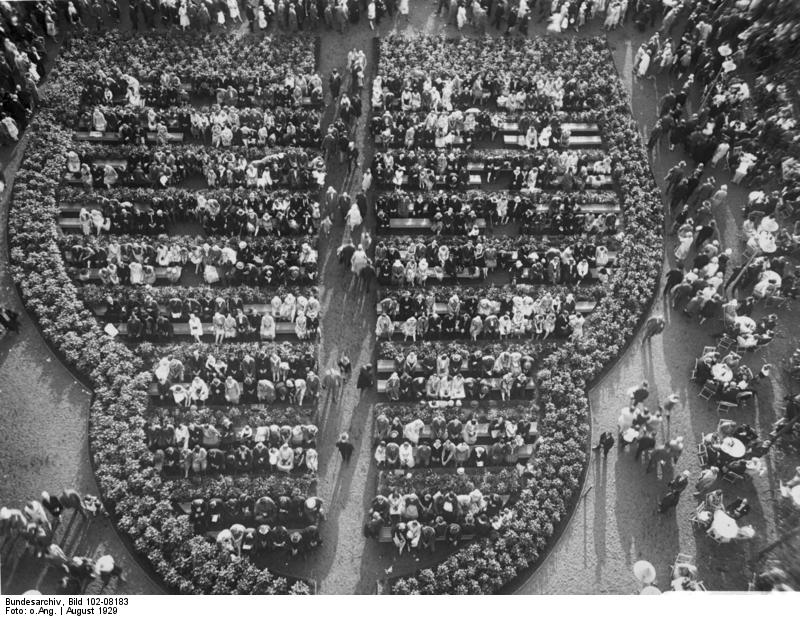
Event in the Radio Garden in 1929

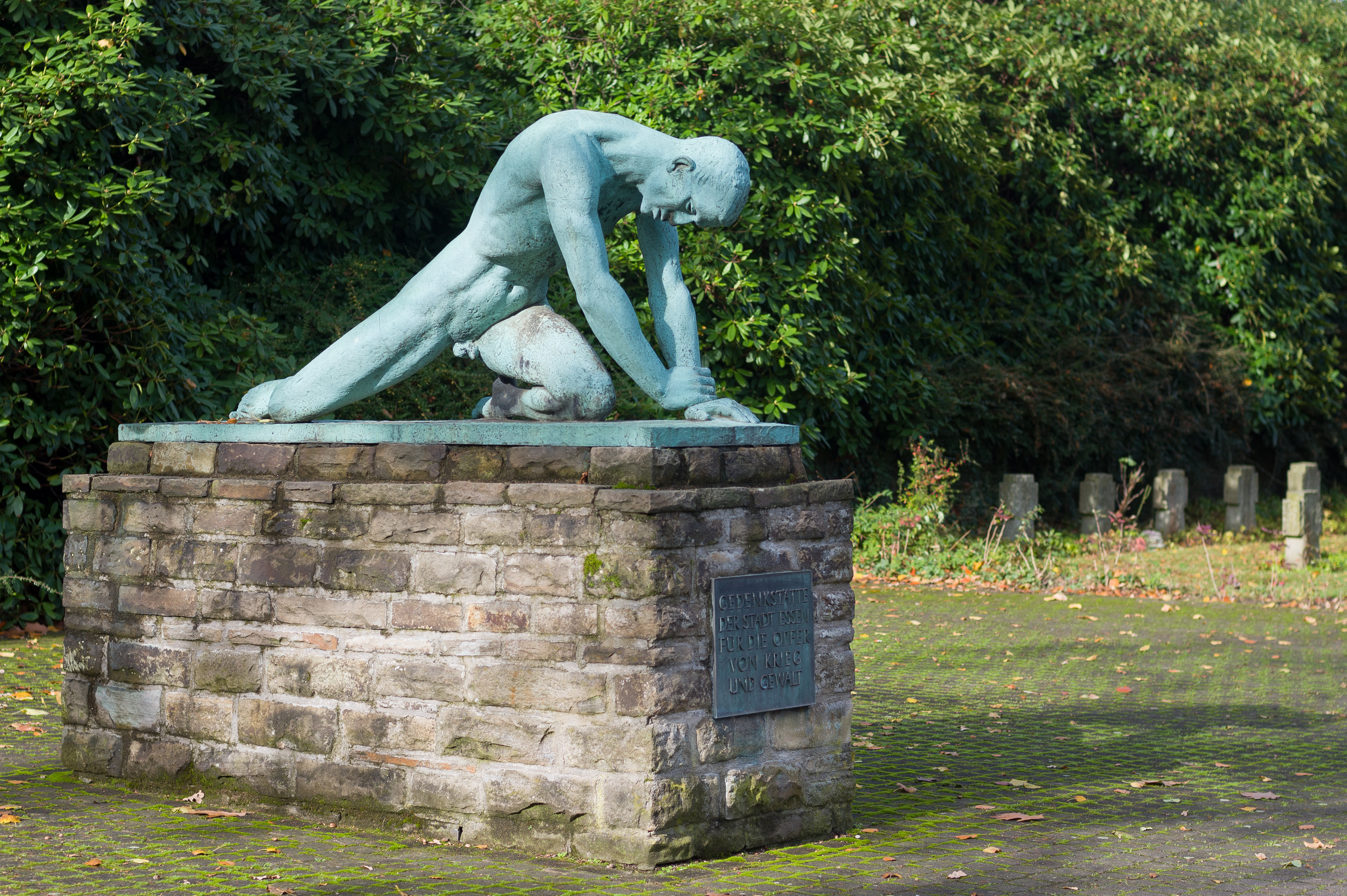
Bronze sculpture "Mourning" by Joseph Enseling, today at the Südwestfriedhof Essen

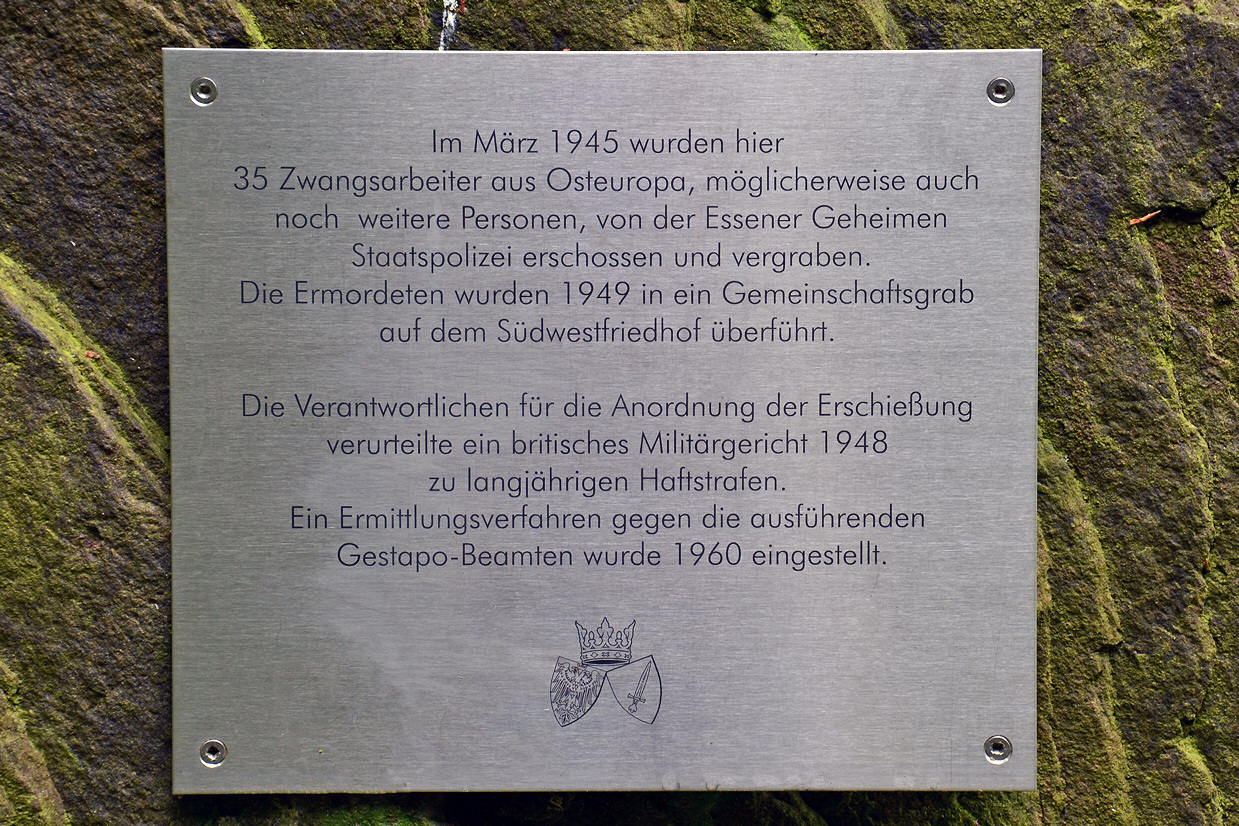
Memorial stone at Montagsloch

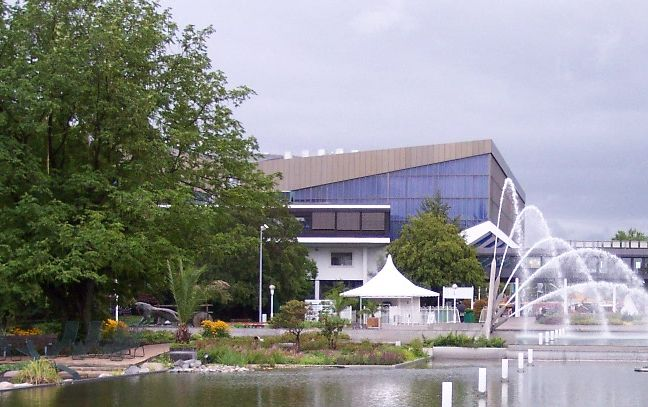
Main entrance area with the water fountains, on the left the Grugahalle

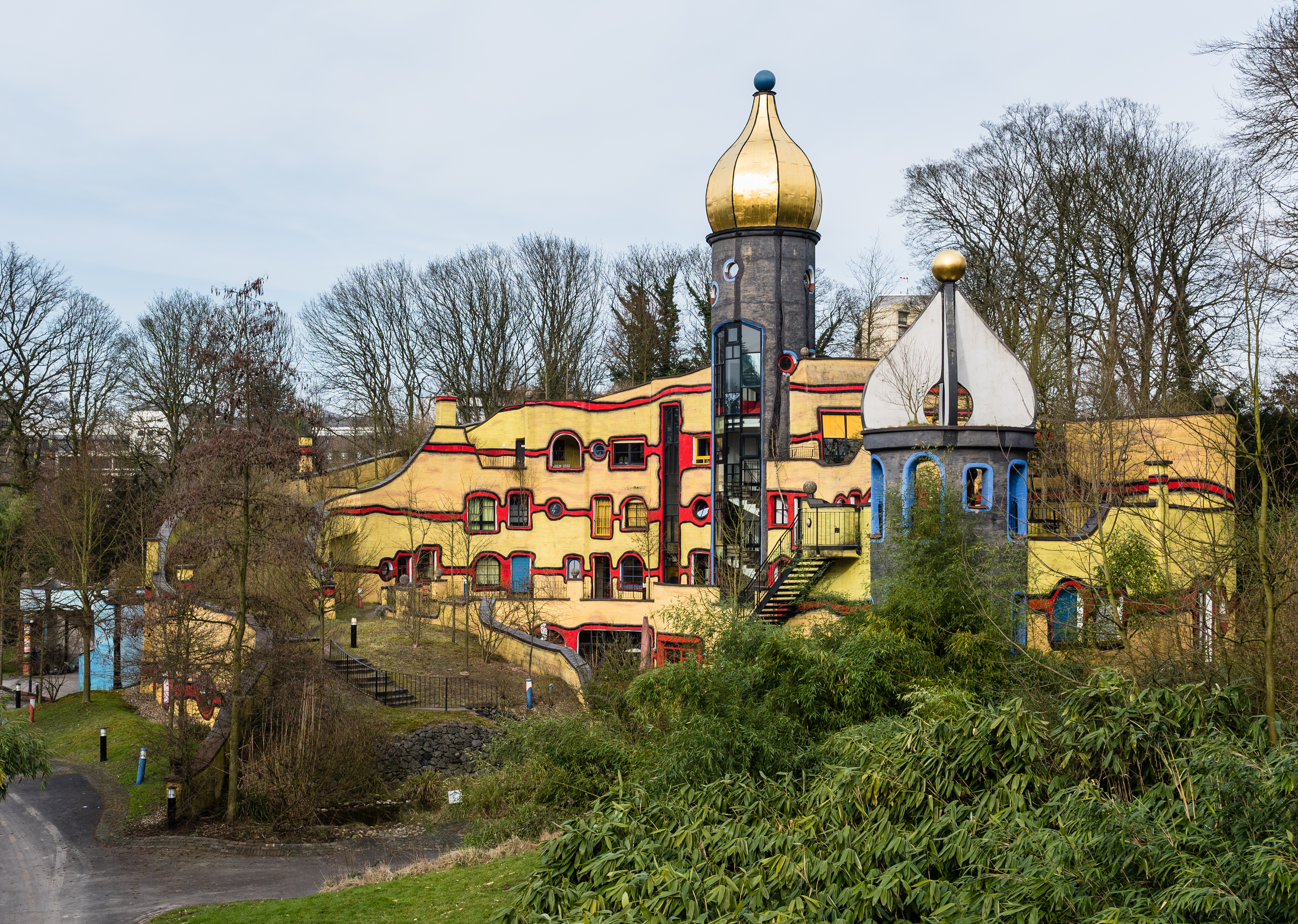
Ronald McDonald House, designed by Friedensreich Hundertwasser

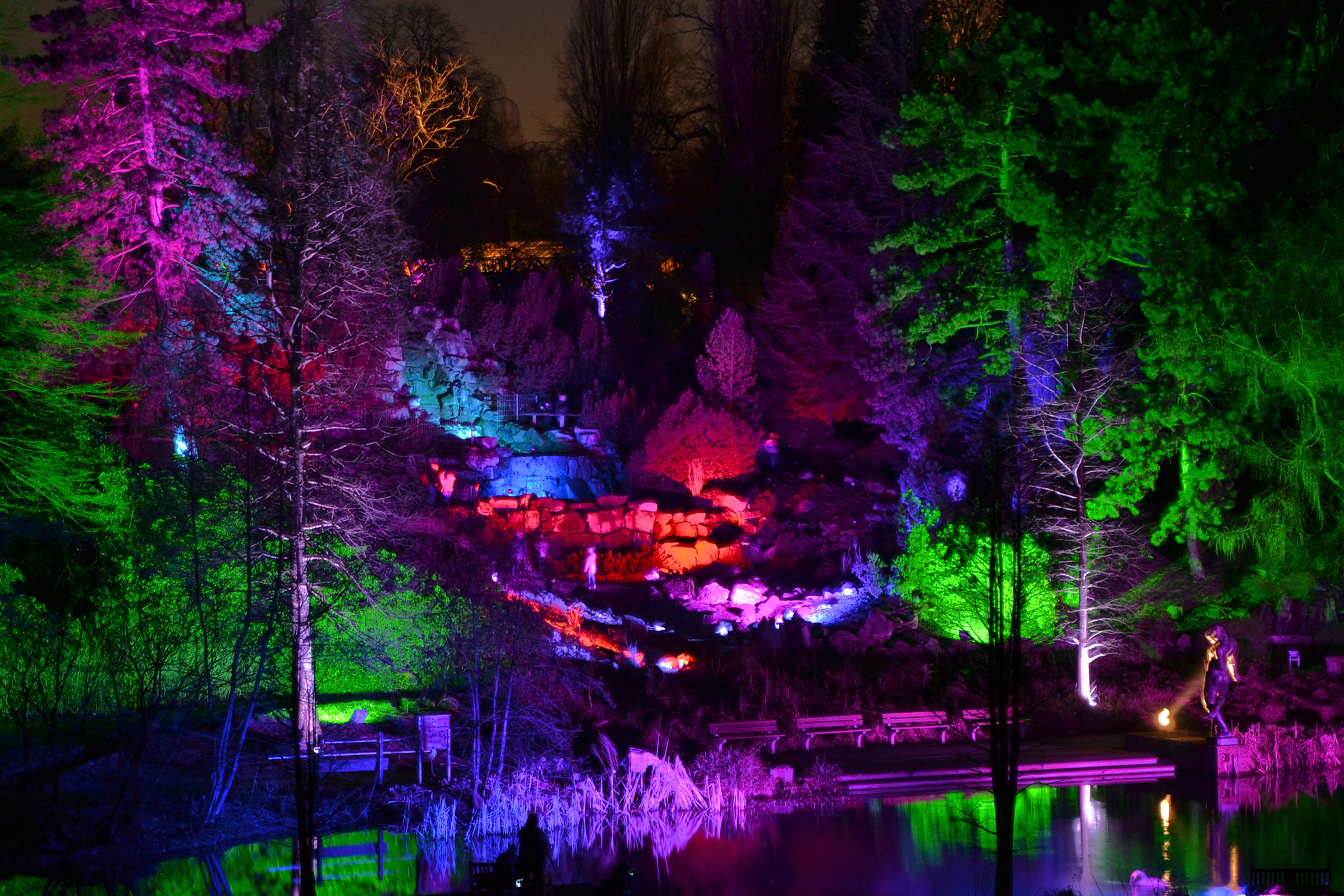
Parklights 2015

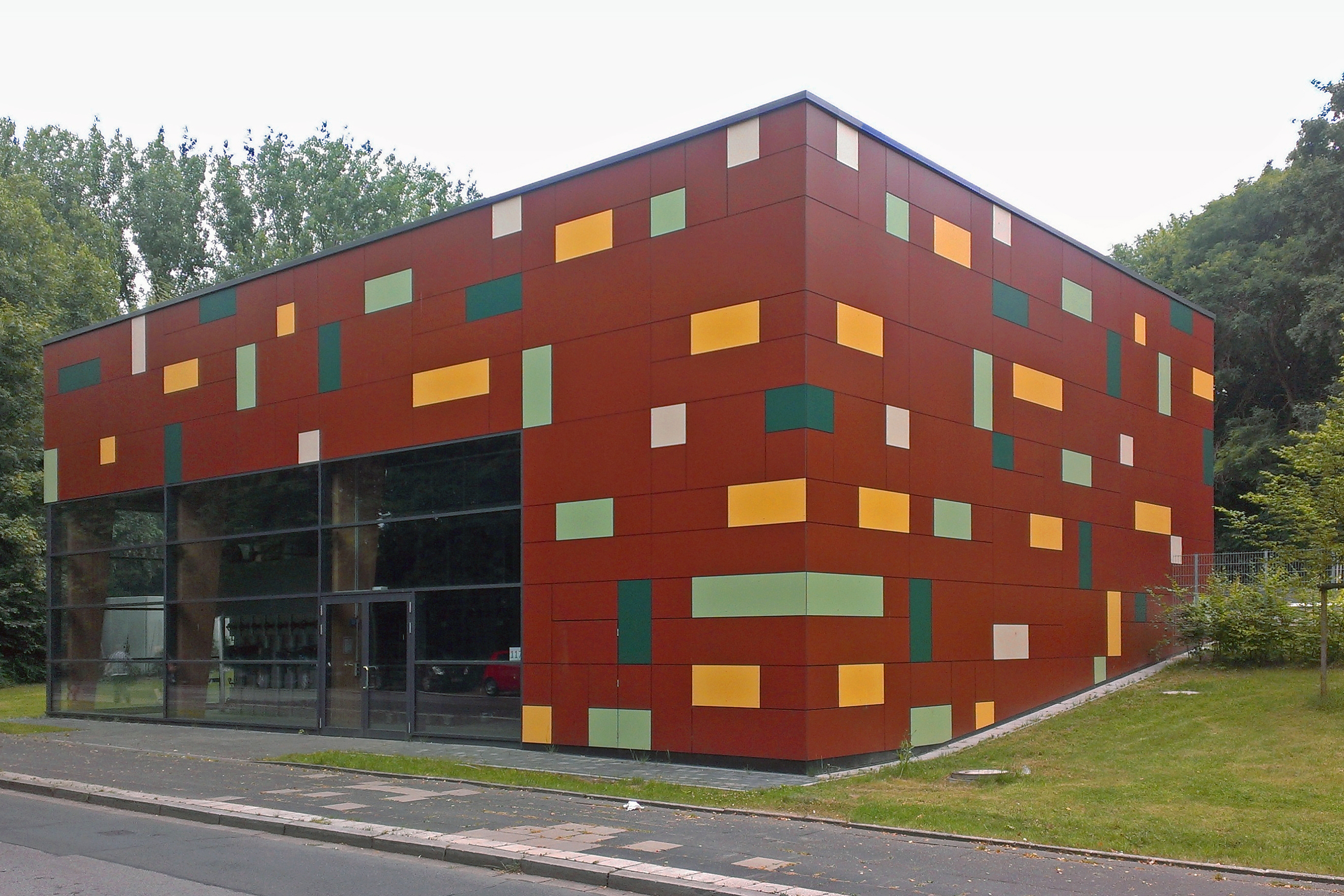
Biomass heating plant

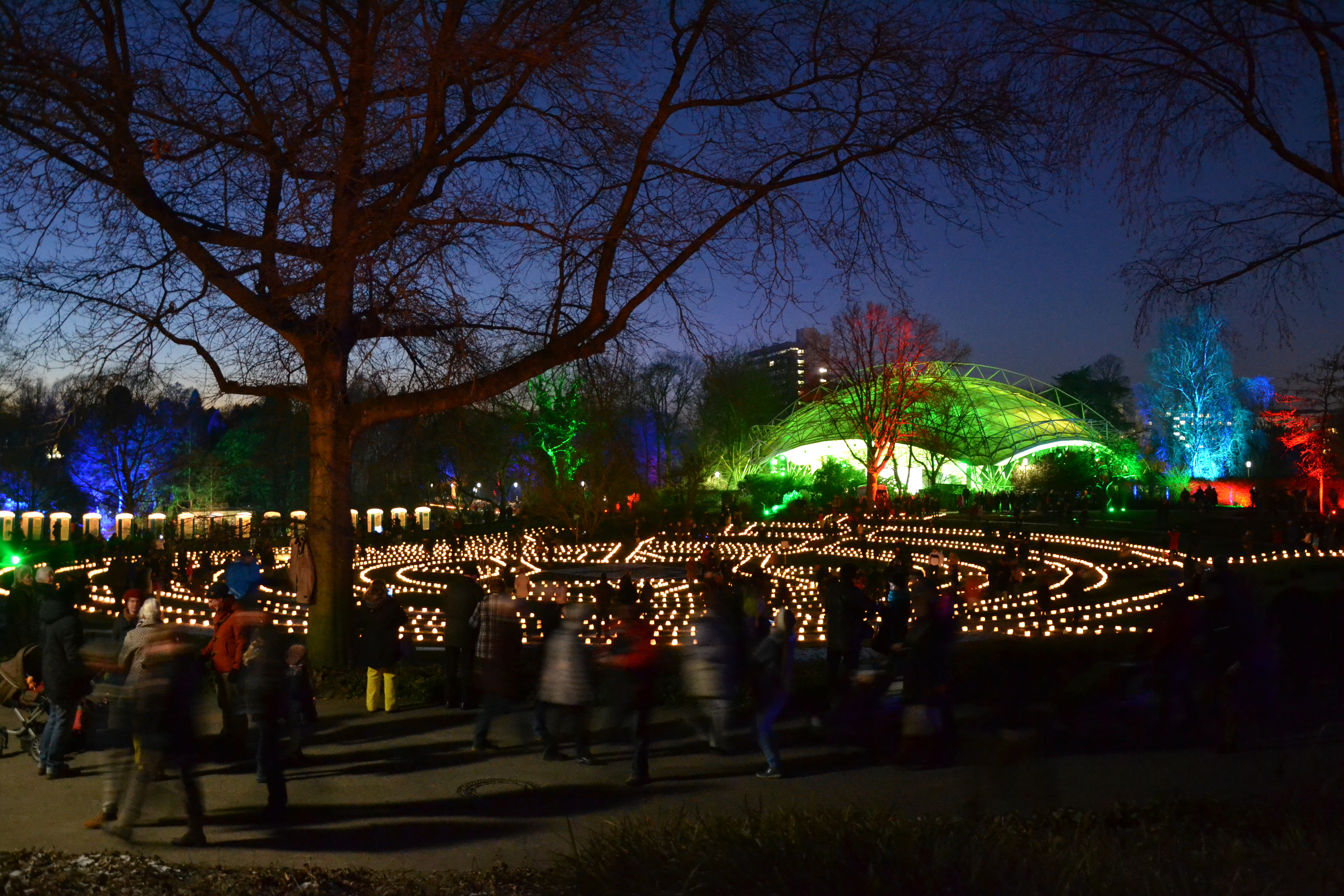
Opening ceremony for the Green Capital of Europe - Essen 2017

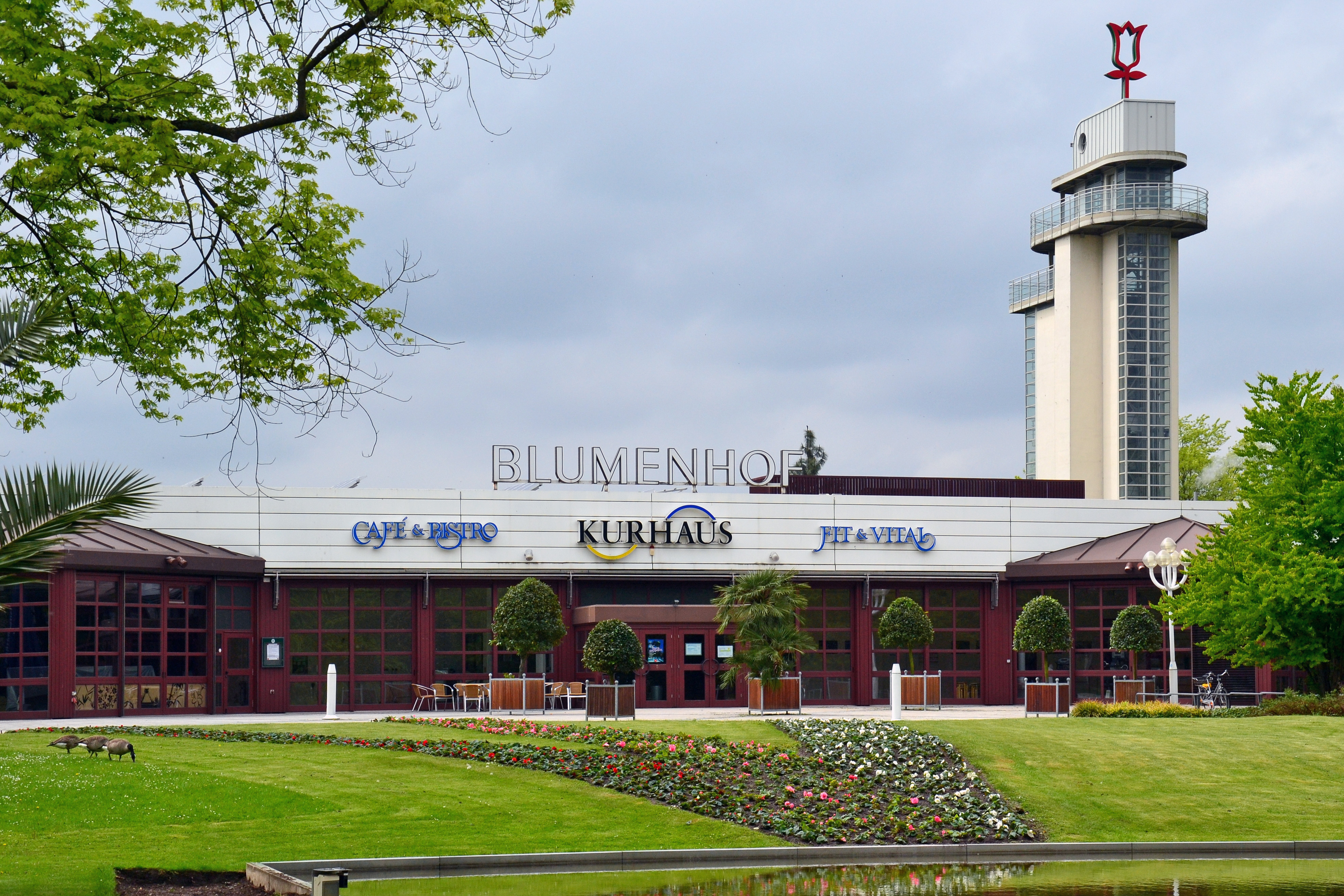
Flower courtyard with Grugaturm

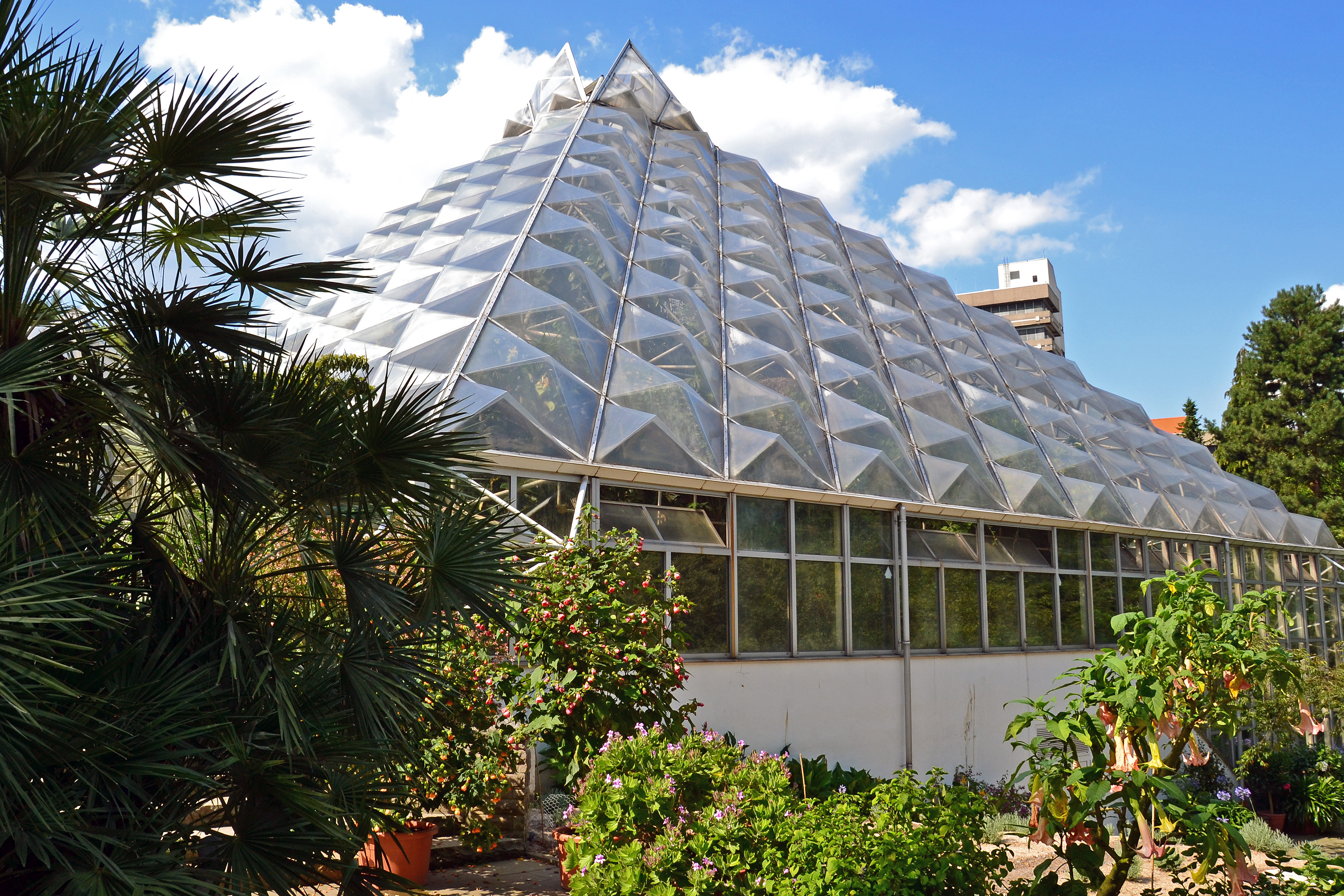
Tropical house, botanical garden

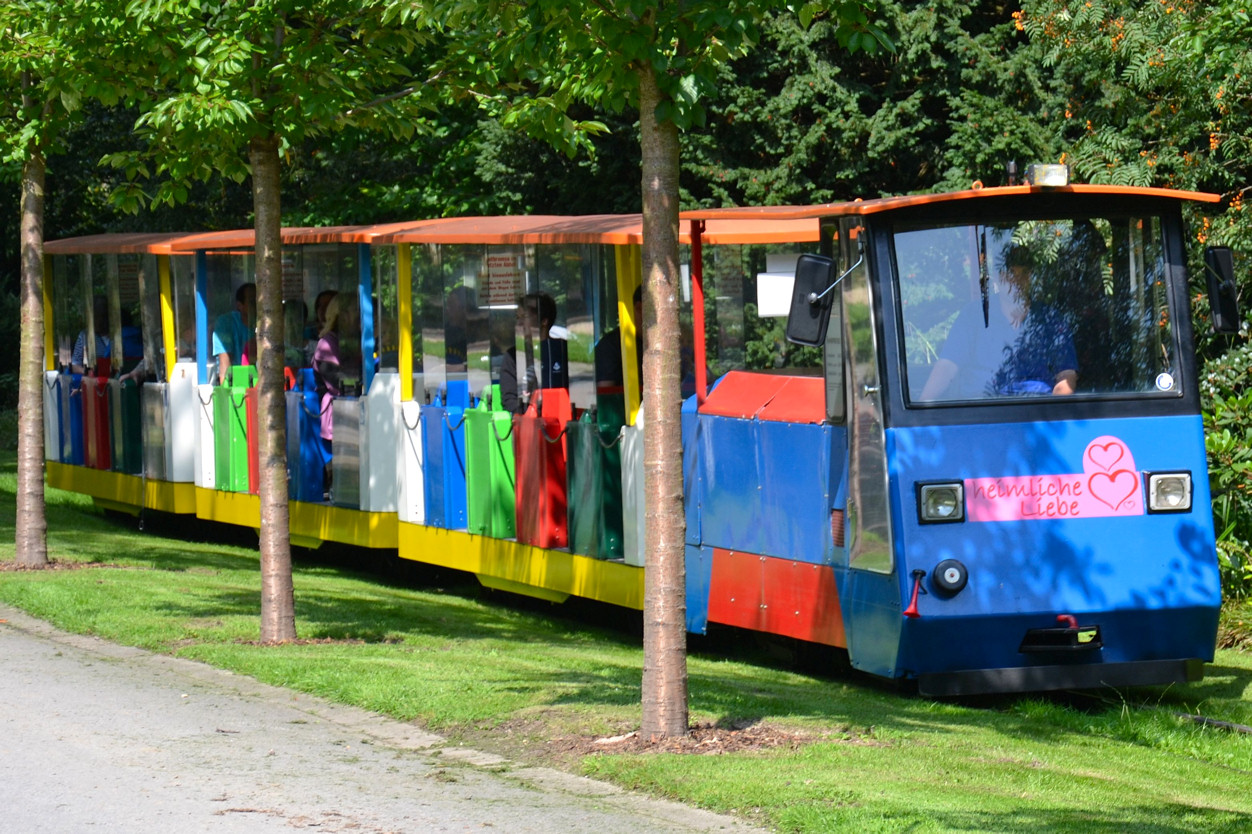
Grugabahn “Secret Love”

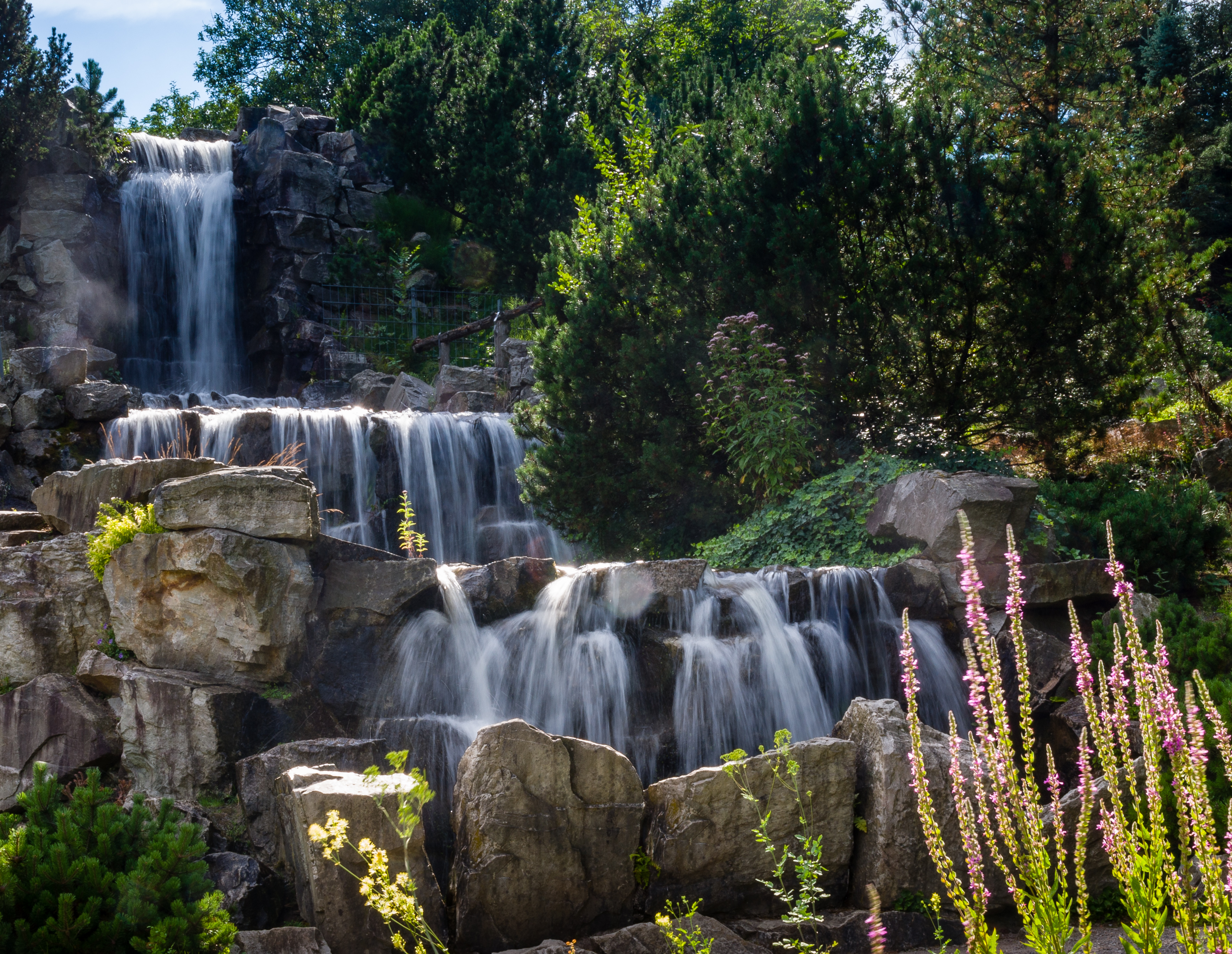
Waterfall in the Alpinum

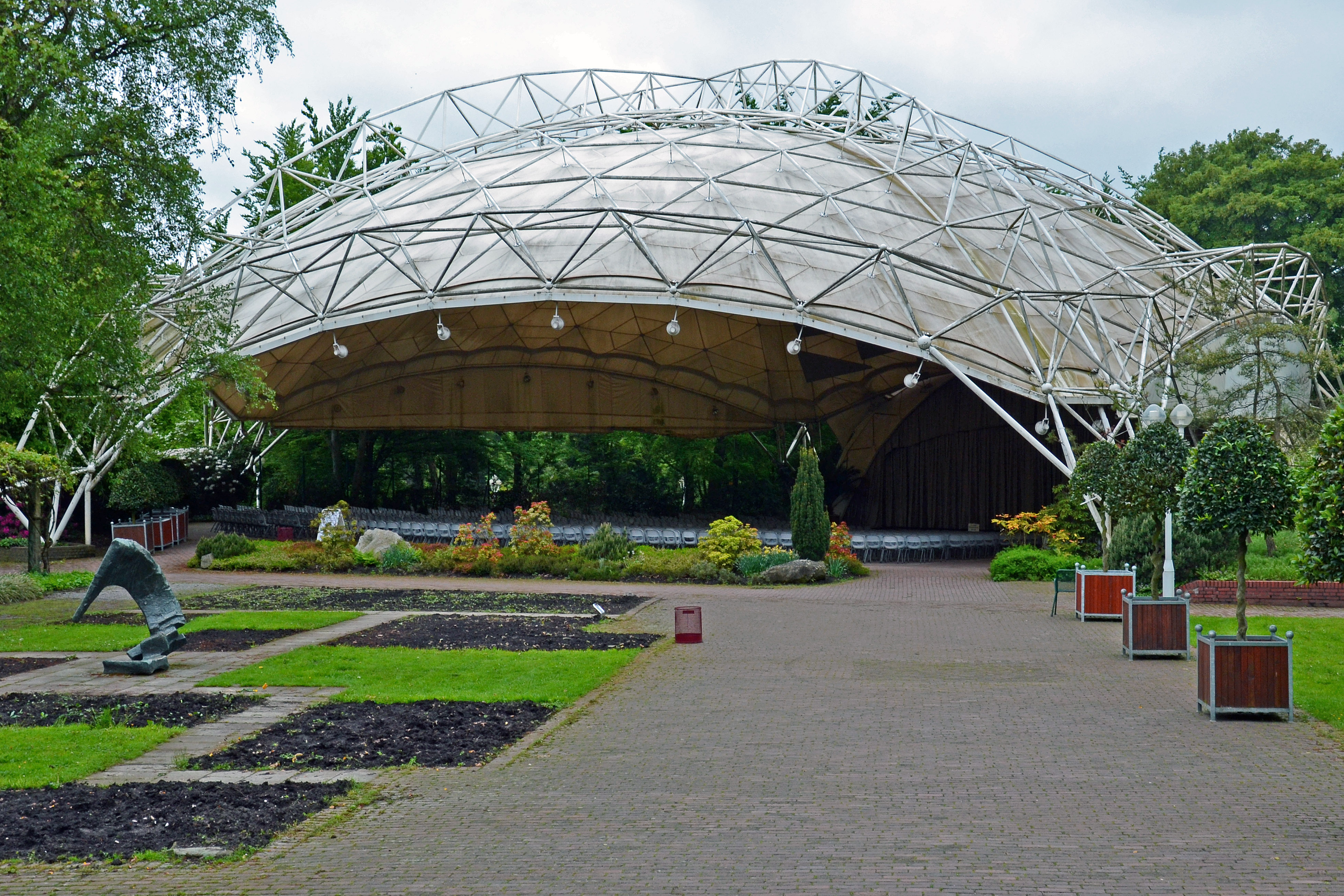
Music pavilion and music garden

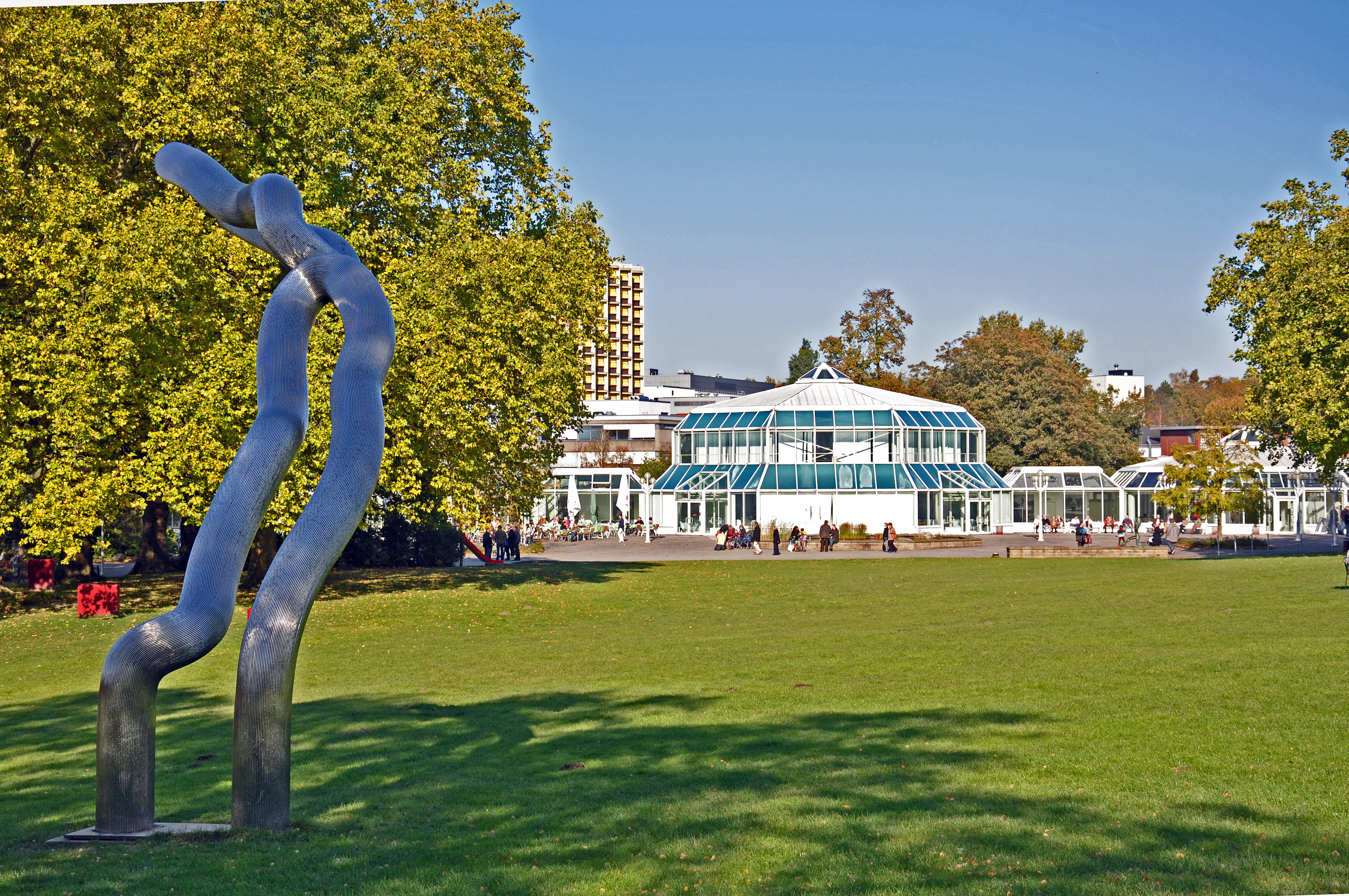
Crane meadow with orangery and sculpture “Orion”

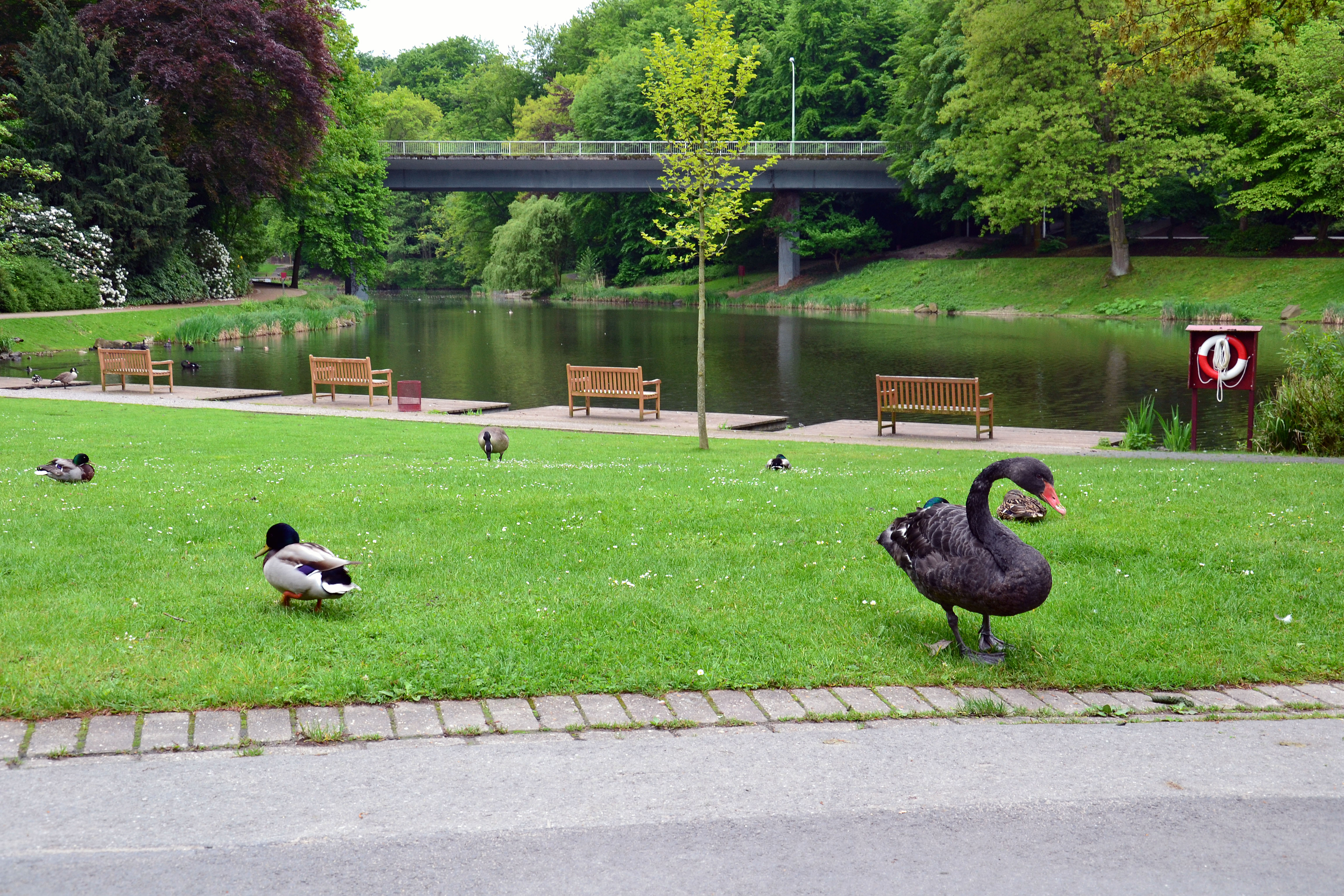
Margaret Lake

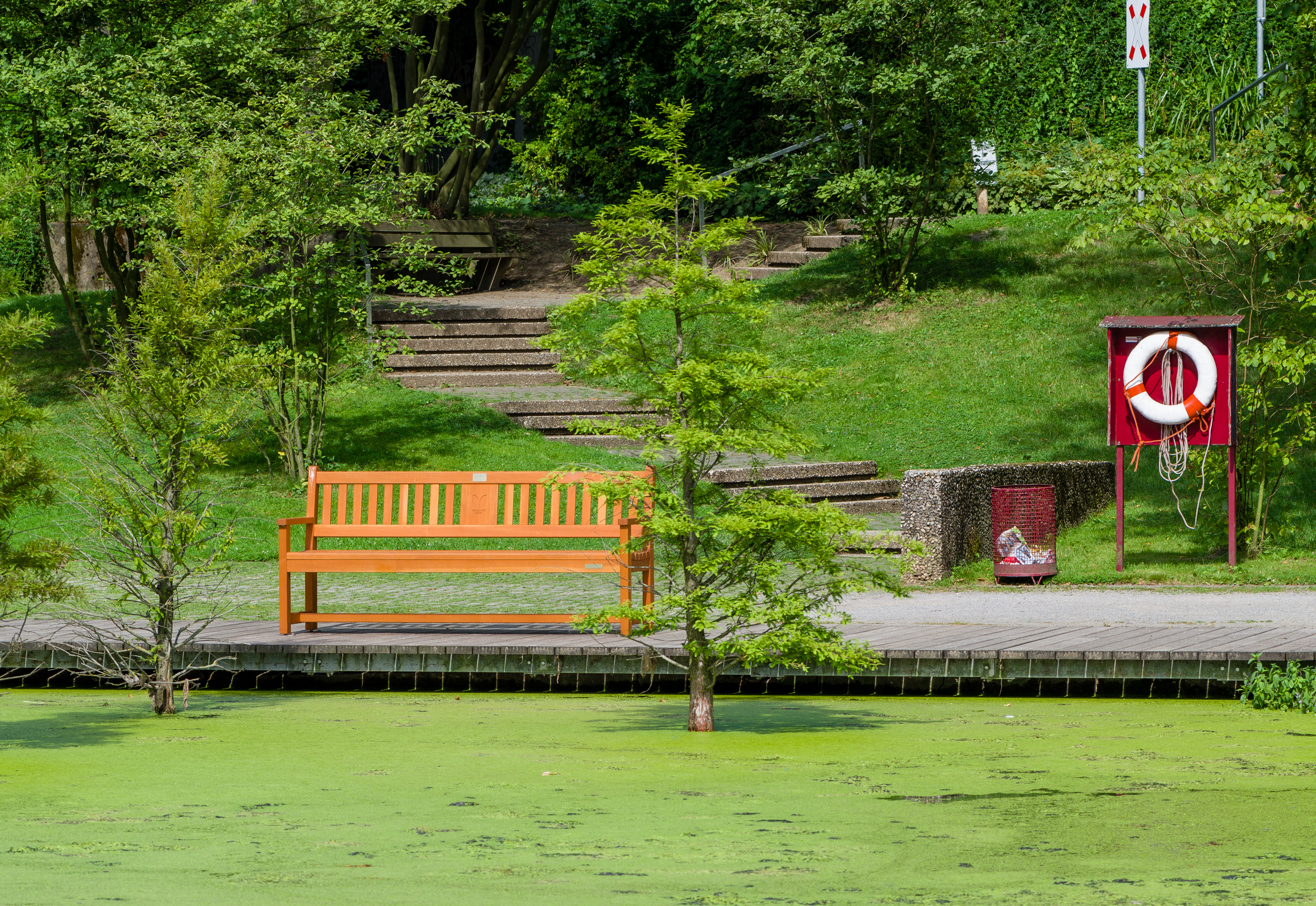
Wald Lake

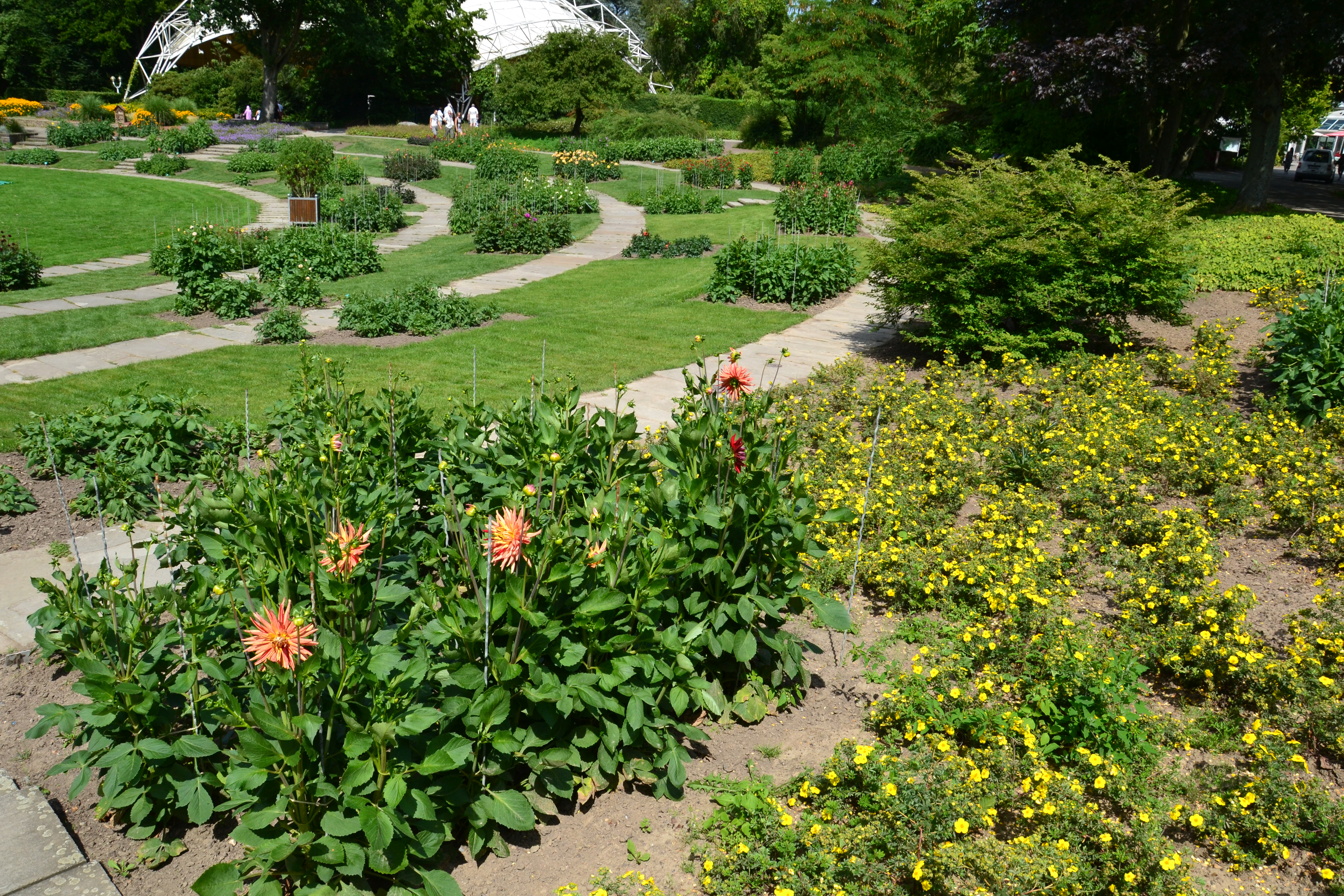
Dahlia Arena

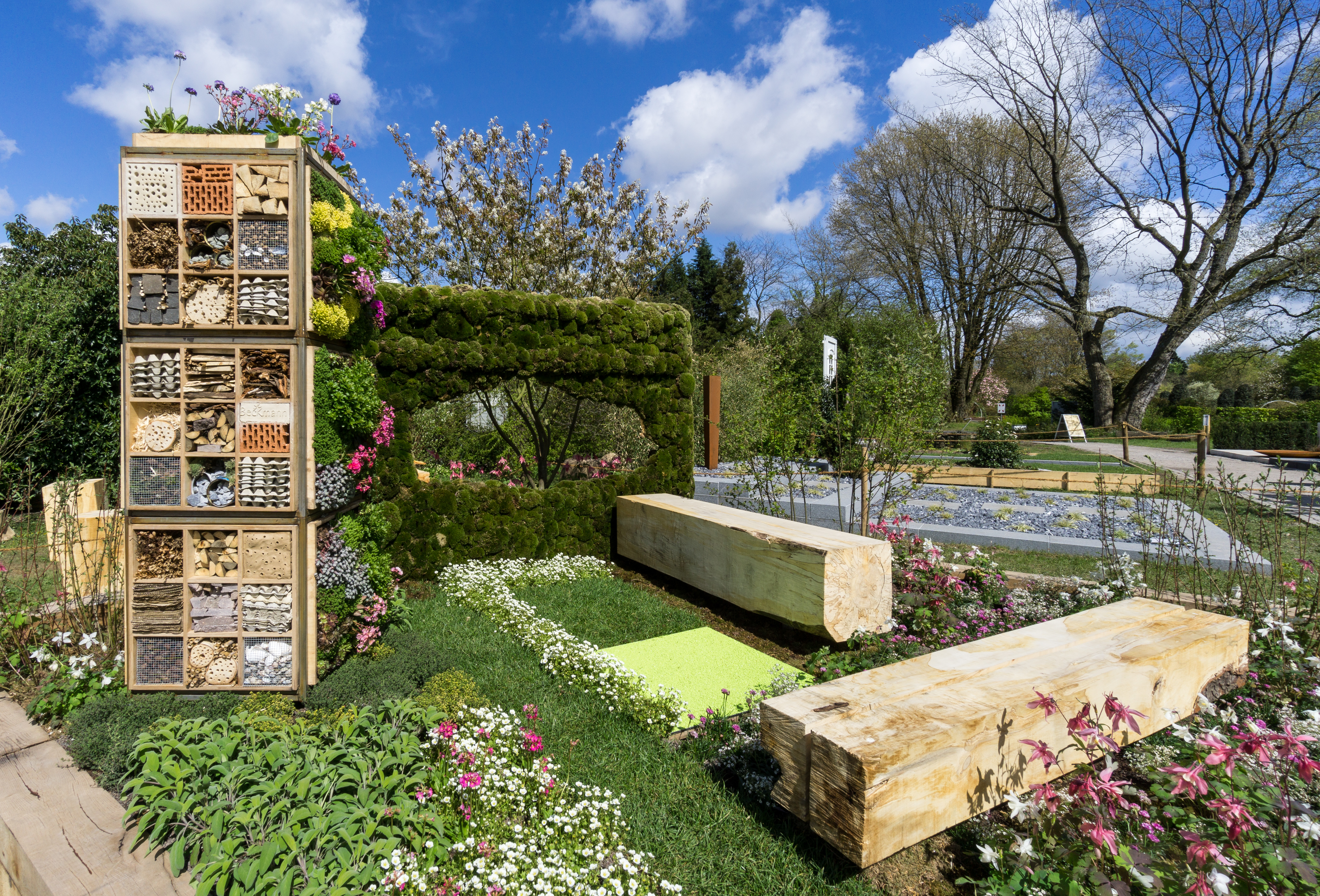
Pattern garden Bee Home Garden
