= Ulrich Erben =

German painter

- Born: March 26, 1940; Düsseldorf, Germany
- Occupation: Painter
- Employer: Kunstakademie Münster
- Known for: Color field painting, abstract painting
- Movement: Color field, abstract expressionism
- Spouse: Ingrid Bachér (m. 1966)
- Awards: Konrad-von-Soest Prize (1986); Otto-Ritschel-Preis (2003)

Ulrich Erben (born 26 March 1940 in Düsseldorf) is a German painter. From 1980 to 2005, he was a Professor of Painting at the Kunstakademie Münster (University of Fine Arts Münster). He is known as a master of the color field style of abstract painting, closely related to abstract expressionism, in which he creates tension between a defined surface structure, his own method of applying paint to a canvas, and the relationship of various shades of white or color to each other in their placement as part of a composition on the flat plane of a canvas. In 1986 and 2008, he was awarded the Konrad-von-Soest Prize for Visual Arts by the Landschaftsverband Westfalen-Lippe (Landscape Society Westphalia-Lippe).

== Life and work ==
Ulrich Erben spent his youth on the Lower Rhine and in Rome, where his family moved in 1956. From 1958 to 1965, he studied painting, graphic techniques, fresco painting and drawing at art academies in Hamburg, Urbino, Venice, Munich and Berlin. Starting his career with landscapes and still lifes, his paintings increasingly used geometric forms. During this period he divided his time between Italy and his homeland on the Lower Rhine, interrupted by a longer stay in Paris in 1963.

In 1966, Erben married the writer Ingrid Bachér and returned to the lower Rhine. In 1967, he took his first sojourn in the United States, where, in an intensive personal confrontation with landscape and architecture and their mythological meaning, he reduced the use of forms and colors in his works. Already in these early years of his career, "the landscape as bearer of memory turns into a central category of Erben's art."

=== 1968–1977 ===
In 1968, Erben created his first "weiße Bilder" ("white paintings"). They are defined by a white zone in the center of the painting, which is distinct from the matte background, which is a dimmer white background. In this process Erben developed his primary theme of the reciprocal as understood in relationship to objectless and simple form-areas. He was interested particularly in the boundaries of connections; in the formation of space without perspective; and in the underlayment of white and, later, colored surfaces with paint layers of barely perceptible varying tonality.

In 1972, Erben began his "weiße Bilder" period of white-on-white paintings, in which he engages with manipulated light effects to create light objects (Lichtobjekts) and murals. He showed his first light object installation, Lichtraum (Halogenobjekt) (Light space: Halogen object) in the "Szene Rhein Ruhr '72" exhibition at the Grugapark in Essen, organized by Dieter Honisch of the Museum Folkwang. There he hung an unpainted canvas behind a wall of stretched gauze and illuminated it with a halogen light from the front and the back sides, thus producing the illusion of an actual painting.

In 1975, Erben moved to Düsseldorf, where he is a neighbor of the artist Günther Uecker, without relinquishing his house in Goch on the lower Rhine. In the further development of his "weiße Bilder", the first colored, almost monochrome, works emerged in 1977, and were exhibited at documenta 6 in Kassel.

=== 1978–2014 ===
In 1978, Erben's paintings changed dramatically. He now joined pure colors and irregular forms on his canvases in a single painting process; he used it to create the "prima-vista" series, as well as paintings on bounded and unbounded space, "Interieurs" and "Exterieurs". Yet here as well the "relationship of tension between painterly autonomy and formal order" is a determining principle. From 1979 on, Erben has also created large spatial works, which consist of individual, serially arranged sheets of paper. The transformation of real space through painting repeatedly became the subject of his work.

In 1980 Erben was appointed professor at the Kunstakademie Düsseldorf, Münster Division (later Kunstakademie Münster). He has been a professor emeritus there since 2005.

In 1988 Erben returned to stricter geometrical image partitions in his works, which display a clear connection to the early "weiße Bilder". In this changed painting technique using acrylic and pigments, a series of paintings arose that Erben calls "Farben der Erinnerung" ("Colors of Memory"): paintings whose colors mutually intensify one another into a luminous appearance that balances harmony and disharmony. A comparable, but even more enhanced, space and light effect is developed in the work group "Siria" from 2009 to 2010, which harkens back to a journey he made in 2007 through the desert landscapes of Syria.

In 1992, Erben became a member of the Visual Arts Section of the Akademie der Künste in Berlin. On the occasion of his solo exhibition at the Shiga Museum of Modern Art in Osaka, he took a study trip to Japan.

Since 1993, Erben has been creating site-specific wall arrangements in public buildings in Hannover, Essen, Stuttgart and Berlin, among others. He also has wall paintings or installations for temporarily conceived spaces in museums or in the context of exhibition projects.

Since 1988, he has also been using oil paint, initially for more representational small-format paintings, with echoes of Italian landscape motifs, under the theme "was ich sehe" ("what I see"). He began using oil paint for large-format, multi-panel paintings, and is increasingly taking up earlier themes and interpreting them anew.

Subsequent to the "Siria" work group, Erben's paintings from 2010 on show a greater variety of geometric forms and their arrangements. As of 2014, through muted color transitions, Erben brings immaterial movement and simultaneously luminous quietude into his paintings, which are designated by the collective title "Festlegung des Unbegrenzten" ["Fixing of the Unbounded"].

Ulrich Erben lives and works in Düsseldorf, Goch, and Bagnoregio (Italy).

== Awards ==
- 1974: Förderpreis des Landes Nordrhein-Westfalen für Bildende Kunst
- 1986: Konrad-von-Soest-Preis
- 2003: Otto-Ritschel-Preis

== Works in public space (public art) ==
- 1988 Kleve: Klever Raum. Museum Haus Koekkoek
- 1990 Rome: Underground station Piazza Bologna
- 1994 Hannover: Niedersächsischer Sparkassen- und Giroverband
- 2001 Berlin: Jakob-Kaiser-Haus (Dorotheenblöcke)
- 2002 Berlin: DSGV, Zentrale des Deutschen Sparkassen- und Giroverbandes (Sparkassenhaus)
- 2008 Freiburg: Zentrum für Biosystemanalyse, Albert-Ludwigs-Universität Freiburg
- 2012 Bochum: Neues Gymnasium

== Works in public collections (selection) ==
- Daimler Art Collection, Stuttgart und Berlin: Membran II. 1995. Acrylic and pigments on canvas. 250 x 210 cm (98.4 x 82.7").
- Kunsthalle Bremen, Bremen: Untitled. 1975. Oil on canvas. 120 x 100 cm (47.2 x 39.4"). Inv. No.: 1564–2014/12
- LWL-Museum für Kunst und Kultur, Münster (former Westf. Landesmuseum für Kunst und Kultur): Balance. 1989. Acrylic and pigments on canvas. 170 x 200 cm (66.9 x 78.7")
- Museum Kunstpalast, Düsseldorf: Dux, böhmisch. 1994. Acrylic and pigments on canvas. 195 x 145 cm (76.8 x 57.1")
- Museum Kurhaus, Kleve: prima vista (grau). 1995. Oil on Canvas. 190 x 150 cm (74.8 x 59.1")
- Pinakothek der Moderne, München: Untitled (1074 1274-I). Oil on canvas. 130 x 200 cm (51.2 x 78.7"). Inv. No. 14419
- Sammlung zeitgenössischer Kunst der Bundesrepublik Deutschland, Bonn: Untitled. 1973. Oil on canvas. 190 x 150 cm (74.8 x 50.1")
- Schauwerk Sindelfingen: Vertical Continuum (ditych). Acrylic and pigments on canvas. 215 x 150 cm (84.7 x 59.1") each.
- Von der Heydt-Museum, Wuppertal: Metamorphosen. 2004. Acrylic and pigments on canvas. 270 x 190 cm (106.3 x 74.8")

== Exhibitions (selection) ==
=== Solo exhibitions ===
- 1971 Galerie m, Bochum
- 1972 Galerie Schmela, Düsseldorf
- 1978 Städtisches Museum Haus Koekoek, Kleve: Ulrich Erben – Felder und Räume
- 1979 Städtisches Museum Leverkusen, Schloss Morsbroich: Atelier I – Ulrich Erben
- 1981 Kunsthalle zu Kiel, Kiel: Ulrich Erben – Felder und Räume, Bilder-Collagen-Zeichnungen
- 1981 Kunsthalle Tübingen, Tübingen: Ulrich Erben – Felder und Räume, Bilder-Collagen-Zeichnungen
- 1983 Padiglione d'arte contemporanea, Parco Massari, Ferrara / Italy: Ulrich Erben – Il colore come presenza
- 1984 Städtische Kunsthalle, Mannheim: Ulrich Erben – Elementare Malerei
- 1990 Kunstverein für die Rheinlande und Westfalen, Düsseldorf: Ulrich Erben – Das Purpurrot der Worte, Farben der Erinnerung
- 1992 Westfälisches Landesmuseum für Kunst- und Kulturgeschichte, Münster: Weiss ist Farbe – Ulrich Erben, Bilder 1968–1978
- 1992 Shiga Museum of Modern Art, Osaka / Japan: Ulrich Erben – Freiheit der Farbe
- 2002 Museum Kurhaus, Kleve: Ulrich Erben – Was ich sehe, Bilder aus Italien
- 2003 Museum Wiesbaden, Wiesbaden: Ulrich Erben – Träger des Otto Ritschel Preises
- 2003/2004 Kunstmuseum Dieselkraftwerk Cottbus, Cottbus: Ulrich Erben – Was ich sehe, Bilder aus Italien
- 2005 Museum DKM, Duisburg: Der stille Raum
- 2010 Museum Kurhaus, Kleve: Ulrich Erben – Siria, Erscheinung und Bewegung
- 2011/2012 MKM Museum Küppersmühle für moderne Kunst, Duisburg: Ulrich Erben – Lust und Kalkül
- 2016 Museum Goch, Goch: Ulrich Erben – Zeiten
- 2018 Kunstmuseum Bochum, Bochum: Die Intimität des Sehens – Lichtbilder von Ulrich Erben
- 2019 Josef Albers Museum Quadrat, Bottrop: Ulrich Erben – Festlegung des Unbegrenzten

=== Group exhibitions ===
1973 Städtische Kunsthalle Düsseldorf, Düsseldorf: Prospect 73 – Maler, Painters, Peintres

1977 Documenta 6, Kassel

1982 Neue Nationalgalerie, Staatliche Museen zu Berlin, Berlin: Hommage à Barnett Newman

1985/1986 Neue Nationalgalerie, Staatliche Museen zu Berlin, Berlin: Kunst in der Bundesrepublik Deutschland. 1945 –1985

== Related literature / exhibition catalogues ==
- Ulrich Erben – Felder und Räume, Bilder-Collagen-Zeichnungen, catalog to the exhibition in the Kunsthalle zu Kiel, 25 Jan. – 22 Mar. 1981; in the Braunschweiger Kunstverein, 10 Apr. – 31 May 1981; and in the Kunsthalle Tübingen, 11 Jul. – 16 Aug. 1981, Kiel 1981
- Ulrich Erben – Elementare Malerei, catalog to the exhibition in the Kunsthalle Mannheim, 07 Apr. – 20 May 1984
- Dieter Honisch (Preface): Kunst in der Bundesrepublik Deutschland. 1945–1985, Nationalgalerie. Staatliche Museen Preußischer Kulturbesitz, Verlag Nicolaische Verlagsbuchhandlung, Berlin 1985, ISBN 3-87584-158-1.
- Ulrich Erben – Das Purpurrot der Worte, Farben der Erinnerung, catalog to the exhibition in the Kunstverein für die Rheinlande und Westfalen, 19 May – 08 Jul. 1990, Düsseldorf 1990, ISBN 3-925974-15-6.
- Weiss ist Farbe – Ulrich Erben, Bilder 1968–1978, catalog to the exhibition in the Westfälisches Landesmuseum, für Kunst- und Kulturgeschichte, Münster, 05 Apr. – 24 May 1992, Karl Kerber Verlag, Bielefeld 1992, ISBN 3-924-639-20-5.
- Ulrich Erben – Was ich sehe, Bilder aus Italien 1998–2001, catalog to the exhibition in the Museum Kurhaus Kleve, 21 Apr. – 21 Mar. 2004; in the Kunstmuseum Dieselkraftwerk Cottbus, 19 Jan. – 23. Mar. 2003; and in the Von der Heydt Museum, Wuppertal, 20 Nov. 2004 – 21 Mar. 2005, Kleve 2002, ISBN 3-934935-08-7.
- Ulrich Erben – Träger des Otto Ritschel Preises 2003, catalog to the exhibition in the Museum Wiesbaden, 23 Nov. 2003 – 21 Mar. 2004, ed. Hanne Dannenberger and Volker Rattemeyer, Wiesbaden 2003, ISBN 3-892-58-057-X.
- Ulrich Erben, ed. galeria studio G7 die Ginevra grigolo, Damiani Editore, Bologna 2010, ISBN 978-88-6208-130-6.
- Ulrich Erben – Lust und Kalkül, catalog to the exhibition in the MKM Museum für Moderne Kunst Duisburg, 28 Oct. 2011 – 29 Jan. 2012, ed. Walter Smerling and Eva Müller-Remmert, Wienand Verlag, Cologne 2011, ISBN 978-3-96098-631-7.
- Ulrich Erben – Festlegung des Unbegrenzten, catalog to the exhibition in the Josef Albers Museum Quadrat Bottrop, ed. Heinz Liesbrock, Verlag der Buchhandlung Walther und Franz König, Cologne 2019, ISBN 978-3-96098-631-7
