= Sambucuccio d'Alando =

Sambucuccio d'Alando was a fourteenth-century Corsican revolutionary.

Leader of a jacquerie, Sambucuccio fought against feudal lords and local partisans of the king of Aragon and his allies. He was allied with Genoa, whose presence he helped cement on the island. Little else is known with certainty about him, and his presence in the area is not recorded after 1370.

Sambucuccio is generally seen as a local hero on Corsica, but some historians choose instead to view him as an instrument of the Genoans. Nevertheless, the reforms which he advocated were an important step in the dismantling of feudalism in the area.
