= Montagsloch =

Memorial in Essen, Germany

Coordinates: 51°25′28.64″N 6°59′41.33″E

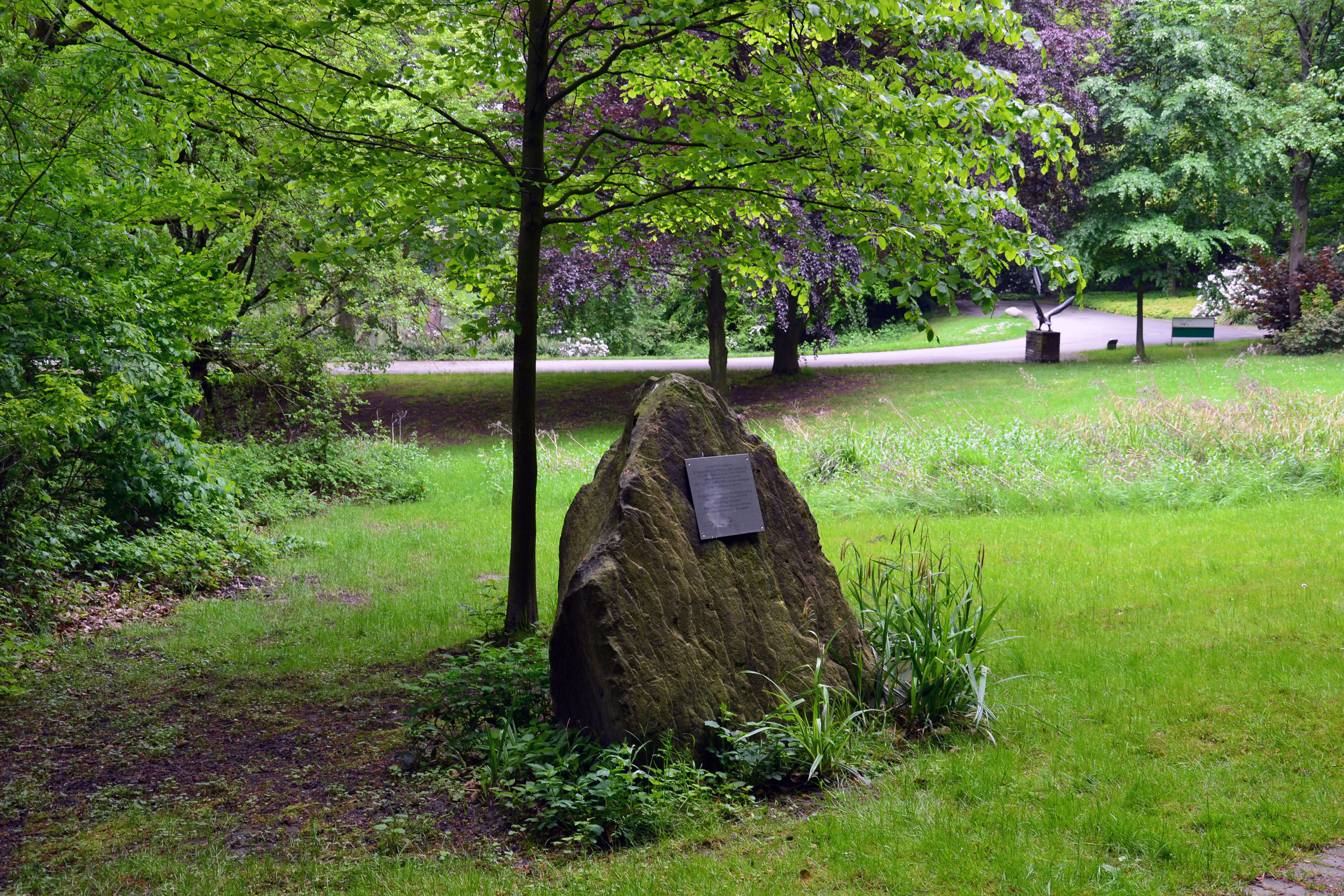
A memorial stone

The Montagsloch (literally: Monday hole) was a building project in Essen during the time of National Socialism in Germany. It would have become one of the biggest stadiums in Germany.

Its name may refer to the day when 35 Russian forced labourers were killed by the Gestapo of Essen at this place. It was on March 12, 1945, a Monday (in German, Montag). Some of the murderers were judged to long term prison sentences by a British military court in 1948.
