= Villa Croce Museum of Contemporary Art =

Contemporary art museum in Carignano, Genoa, Italy

- Museo d'Arte Contemporanea Villa Croce
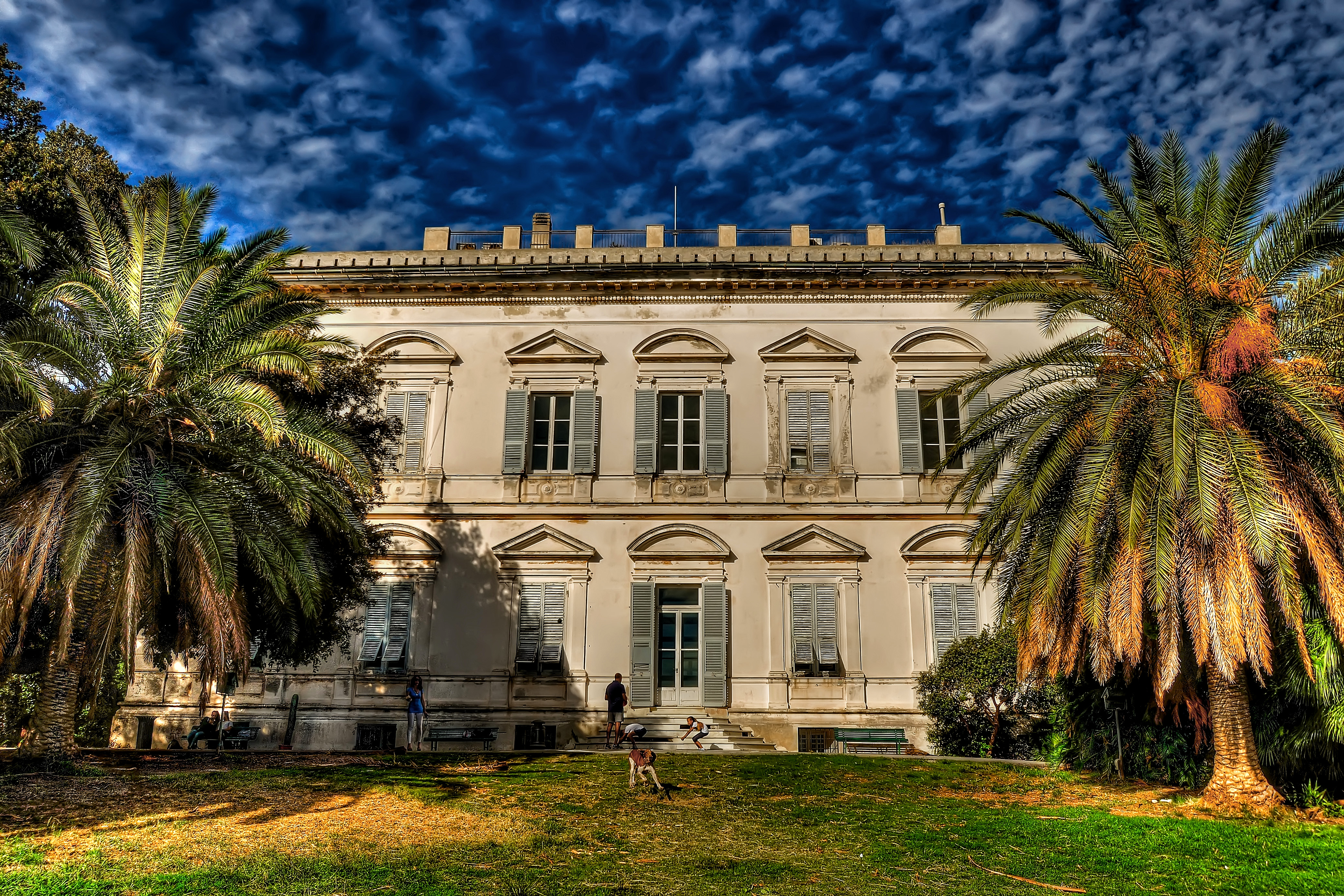
- Villa Croce, facade
- Former name: Villa Croce
- Location: Genoa
- Coordinates: 44°23′54″N 8°56′17″E
- Key holdings: Osvaldo Licini, Mauro Reggiani, Mauro Radice, Lucio Fontana, Piero Manzoni, Dadamaino (Edoarda Emilia Maino), Giuseppe Uncini, Vincenzo Agnetti, Ben Vautier, Philip Cornell, Flavio Favelli, Adrian Paci, Alberto Tadiello and Marta dell'Angelo
- Collection size: > 3000 works of art
- Curator: Carlo Antonelli
- Owner: Municipality of Genoa
- Website: http://www.villacroce.org/en/

The Villa Croce Museum of Contemporary Art (Italian: Museo d'Arte Contemporanea Villa Croce) is a permanent collection of Italian and international contemporary art hosted in a villa in the Carignano quarter of Genoa, northwestern Italy. The villa, donated to the city by the Croce family in 1951, is surrounded by public park with sea views, overhanging the Fiera di Genova exhibition center. It contains more than 3000 works of arts.

== History ==
Villa Croce in its current appearance was remodeled in the neoclassical style in the 19th century for Giovanni Giacomo Croce, modifying a preexisting 17th-century villa which belonged to the Spinola family. It was donated in 1951 to the Municipality to be transformed into a museum.

Opened in 1985, the Museum exhibits a permanent collection of Italian and international contemporary art, gathered by Maria Cernuschi Ghiringhelli, wife of the Italian painter and art collector Gino Ghiringhelli. From 2012, it is managed through a cooperation between public and private funds, involving the Municipality of Genoa, the Palazzo Ducale Foundation and a group of private supporters. From June 2012 to December 2017, the curator of the Museum was Ilaria Bonacossa. From January 2018, the curator of the Museum is Carlo Antonelli.

== The Museum ==
=== The rooms ===
- Ground floor: hosts the bookstore, a conference room and a library specialized in contemporary art and open to the public.
- First floor: dedicated to temporary exhibitions.
- Second floor: contains the permanent exhibitions, including the masterpieces of renowned artists such as Osvaldo Licini, Mauro Reggiani, Mauro Radice, Lucio Fontana, Piero Manzoni, Dadamaino (Edoarda Emilia Maino), Giuseppe Uncini, Vincenzo Agnetti, Ben Vautier, Philip Cornell, Flavio Favelli, Adrian Paci, Alberto Tadiello and Marta dell'Angelo. Occasionally, it also hosts temporary exhibitions.

=== The temporary exhibitions program ===
In the vanguard and always interested in the work of young, emerging artists, the Villa Croce Museum annually hosts a series of contemporary art exhibitions, accompanied by incursions into the world of music, cinema, theatre and literature. These initiatives are also accompanied by exhibitions dedicated to individuals, movements or situations that have deeply changed the history of artistic research. They also cover design to video, installations to photography, to showcase the international art scene and to support promising young and emerging Italian artists.

== See also ==
- Contemporary Art
- Italian modern and contemporary art
- Genoa

== Bibliography ==
- Guida d'Italia Liguria, Touring Club Italiano, 2009, p. 183.
- Catalogo delle Ville Genovesi, Genova, Italia Nostra, 1969, p. 468.
- Rinaldo Luccardini, Carignano. Genova, Storia dell'espansione sulla Collina, SAGEP, ISBN 9788863733006

== Gallery ==
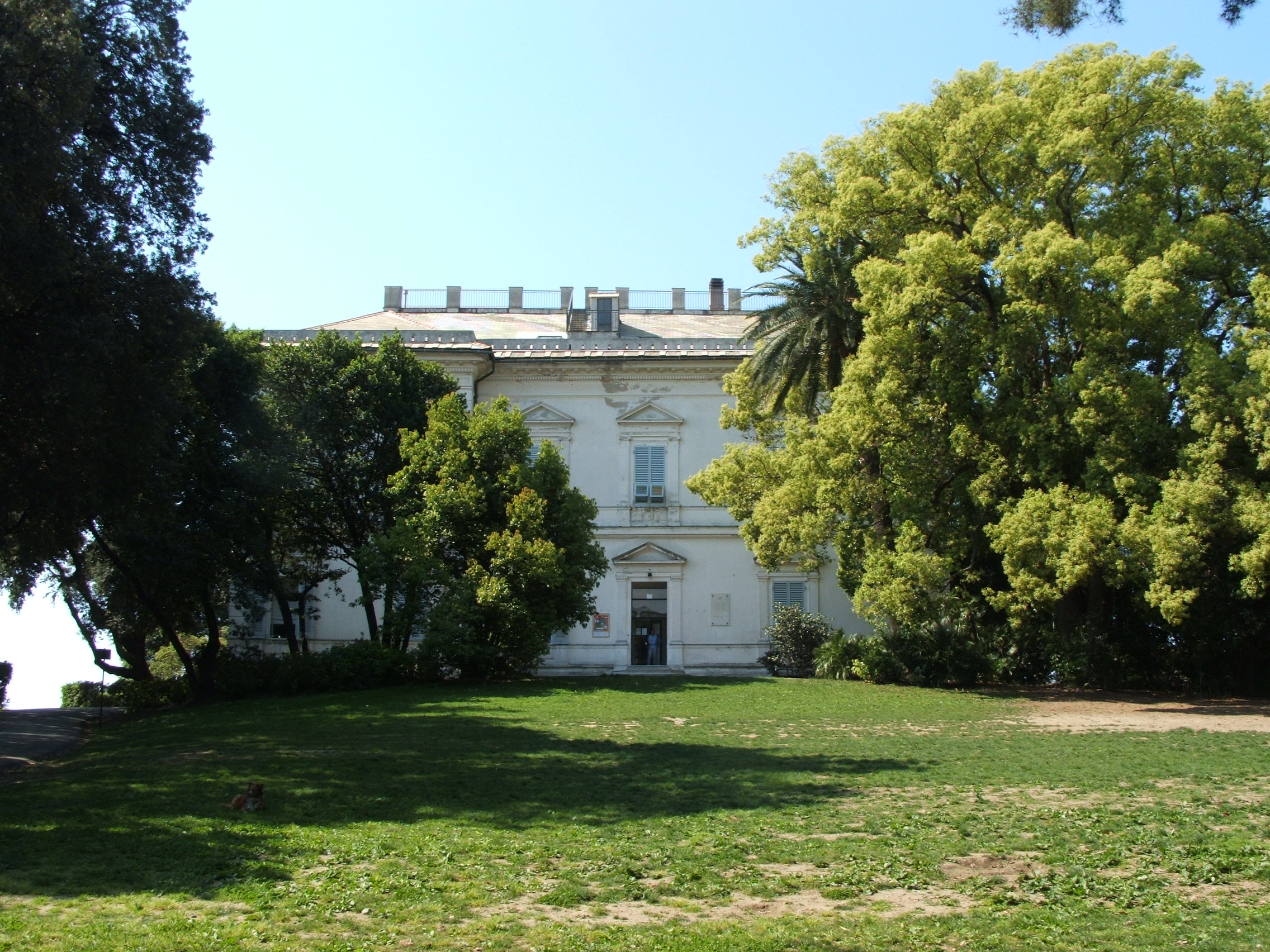
Villa Croce, Museo d'Arte Contemporanea, Carignano, Genova

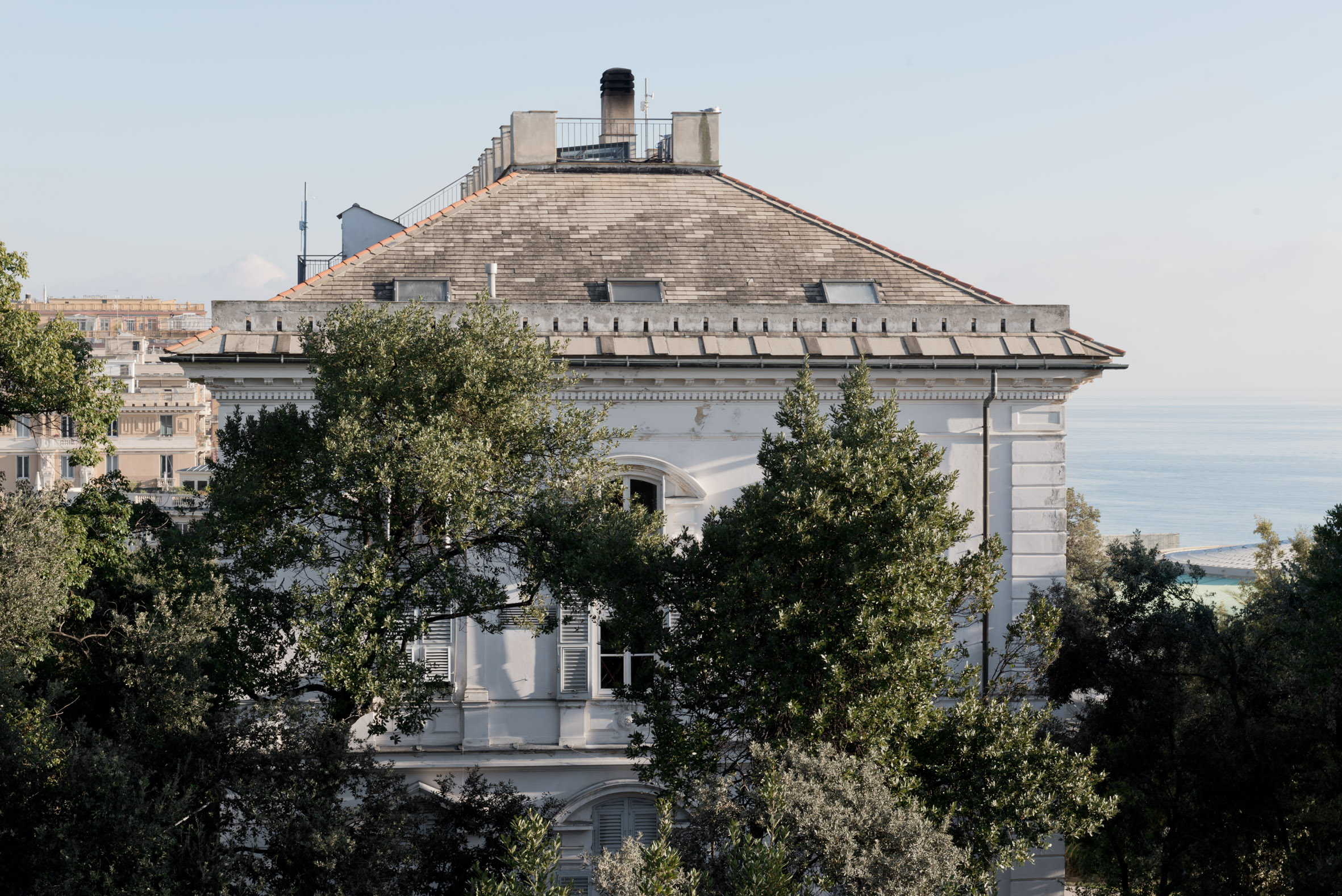
Villa Croce, Museo d'Arte Contemporanea, Carignano, Genova

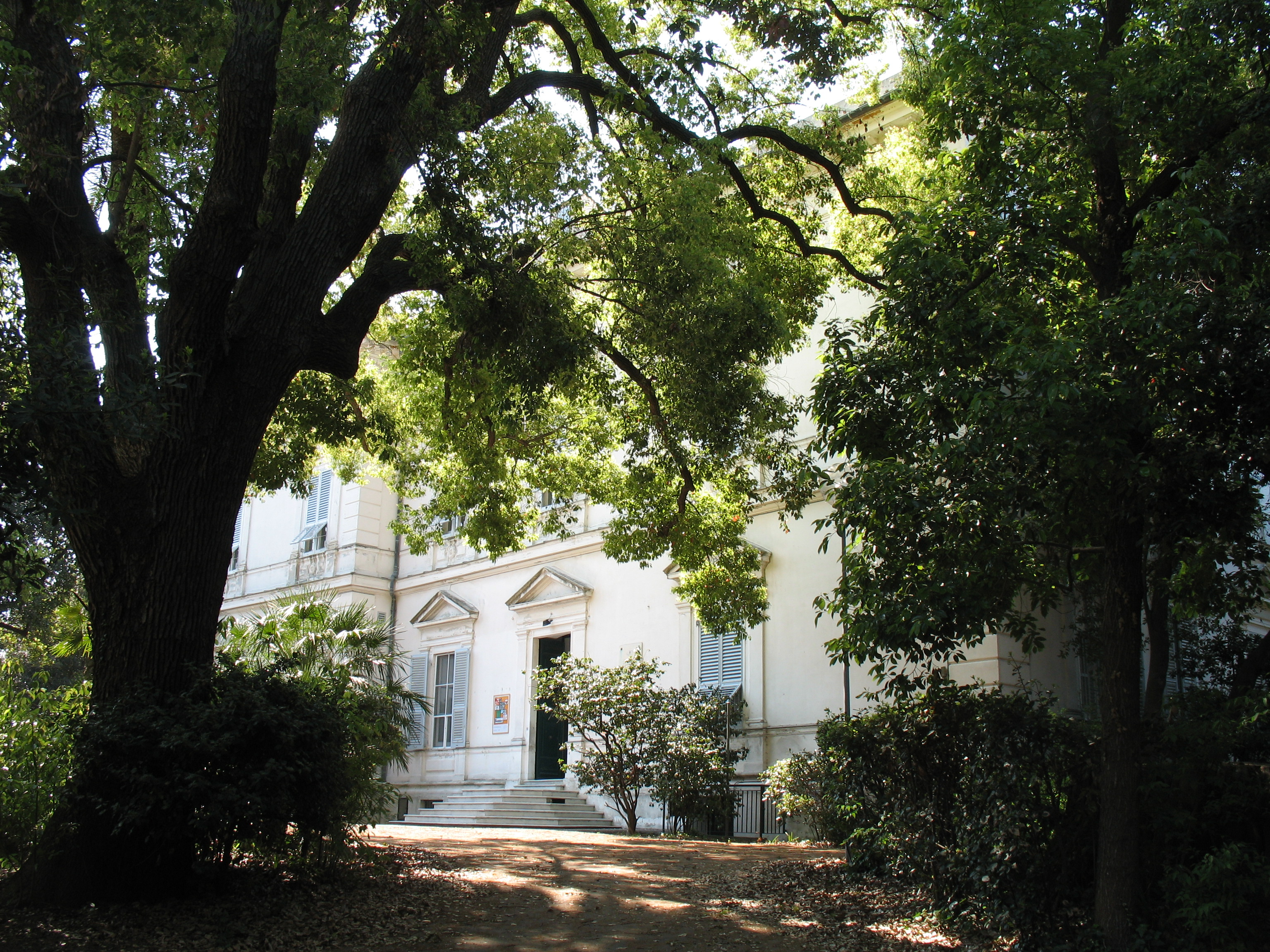
Villa Croce, Museo d'Arte Contemporanea, Carignano, Genova

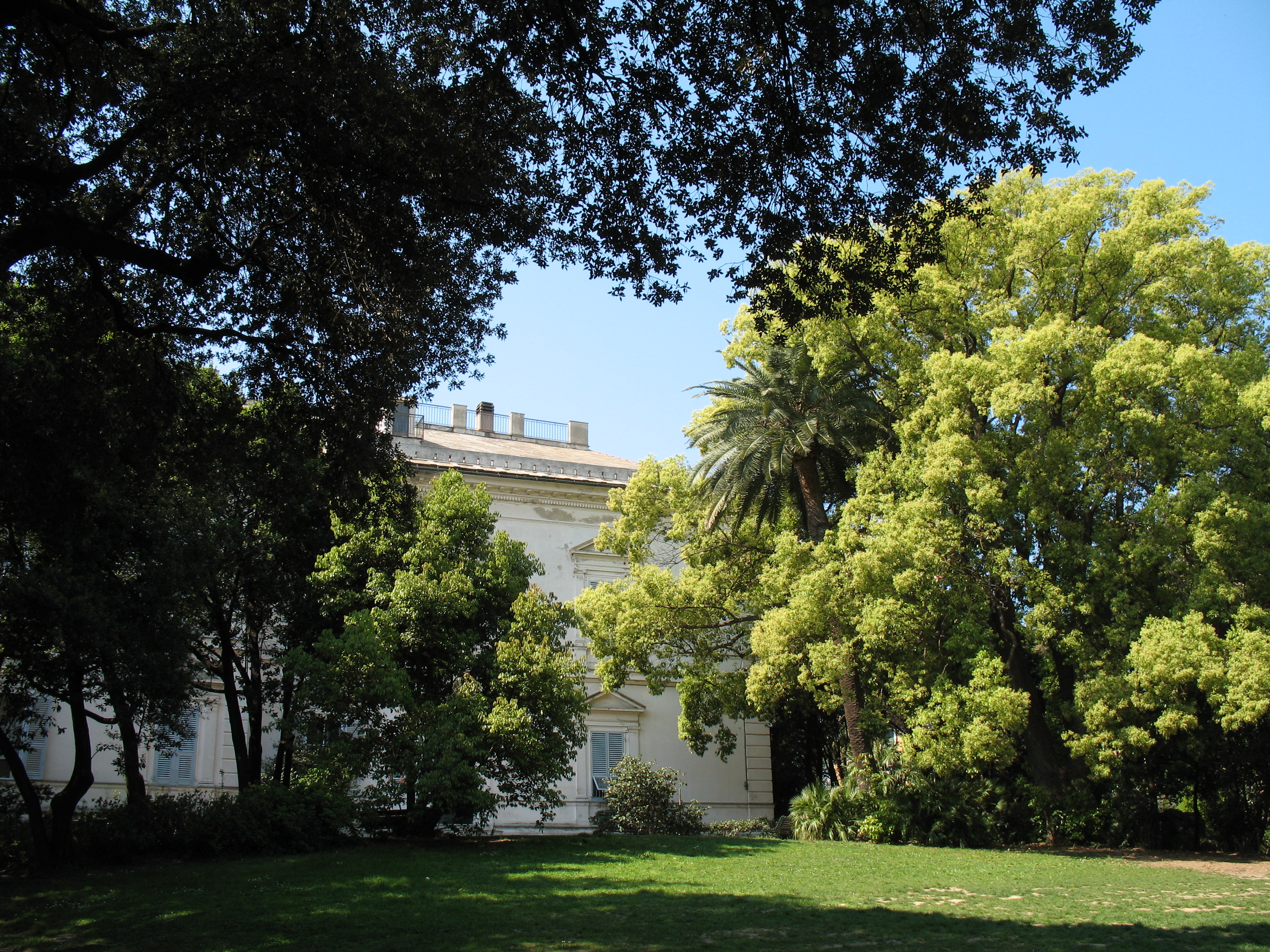
Villa Croce, Museo d'Arte Contemporanea, Carignano, Genova

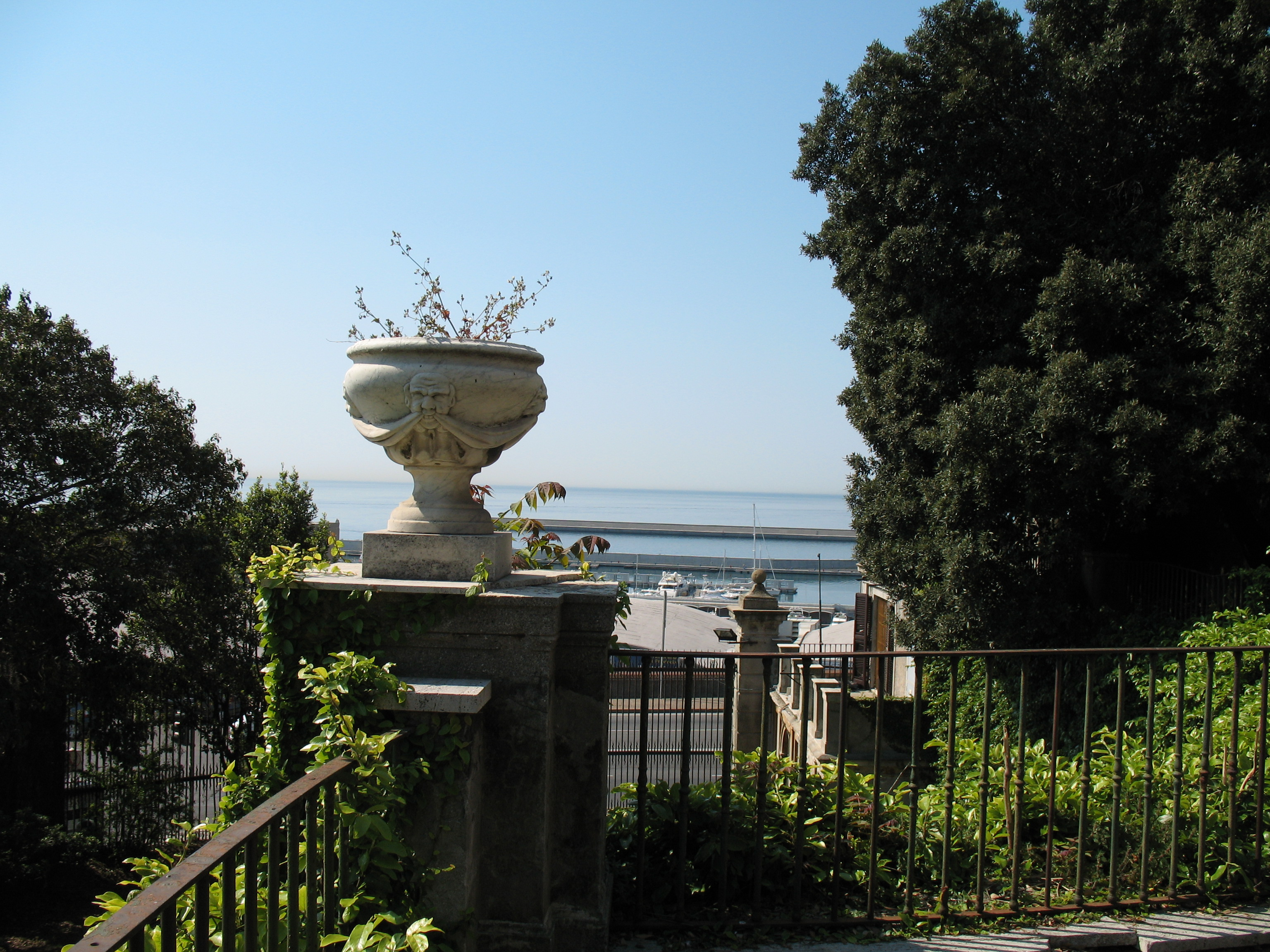
Villa Croce, Museo d'Arte Contemporanea, Carignano, Genova

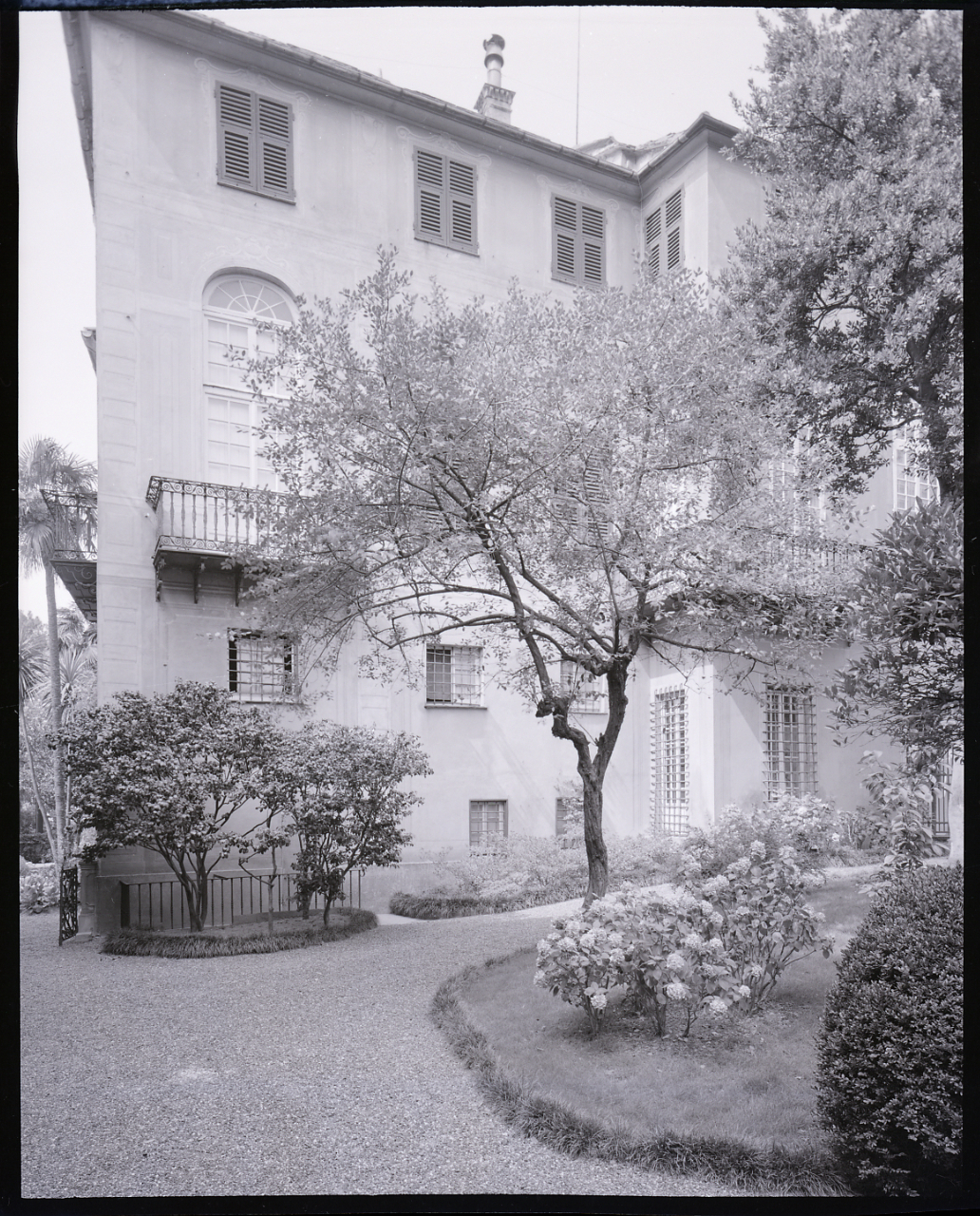
Facade of the villa. Photo by Paolo Monti, 1963

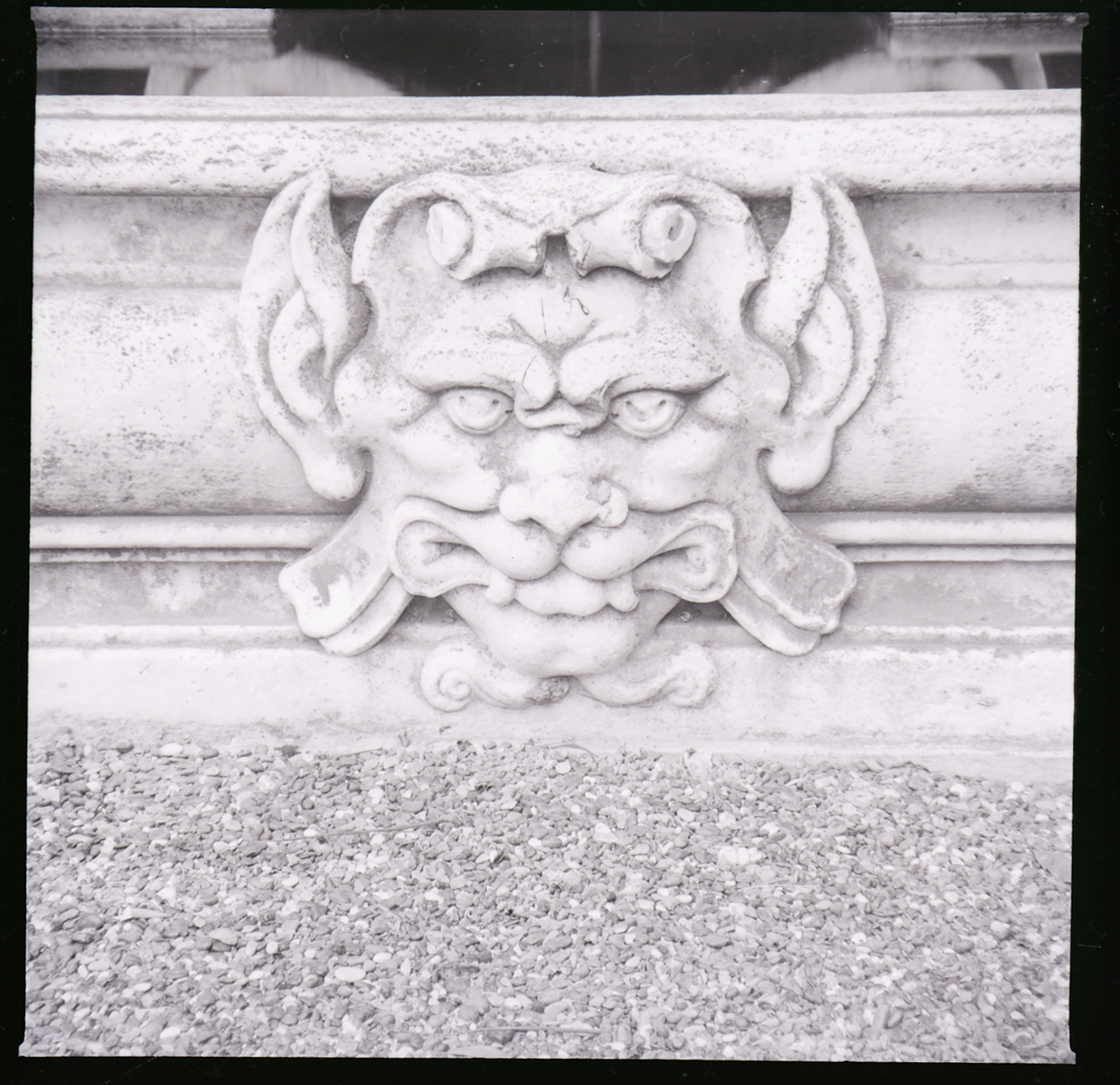
Detail of the decoration of the fountain. Photo by Paolo Monti, 1963
