= Klusmann =

Klusmann is a German surname. Notable people with the surname include:

- Charles Klusmann (1933–2024), American pilot
- Steffen Klusmann (born 1966), German journalist

== See also ==
- Klugmann
- Klussmann
