= Caterina Klusemann =

Caterina Klusemann (born 8 February 1973 in Lucca, Italy) is an independent filmmaker and documentarist.

== Biography ==
Born in 1973 in Italy to the German painter Georg Klusemann and the Venezuelan sociologist and photographer Elena Hochmann-Klusemann, she grew up in Germany and Venezuela. After completing school in French Switzerland, she went on to study neurobiology in Basel, where she co-authored a frequently cited article on the blood–brain barrier. From 1996 to 2001, she studied film directing at Columbia University. Today, she is based in Berlin.

Her documentary Ima shows her fight to uncover the secrets of her grandmother's survival during the Holocaust. Her style is "very personal yet without being intrusive." The result is "a very honest, unpathetic exploration of the 'third generation'." The film won the Findling Award and the Bayerische Dokumentarfilmpreis – Junger Löwe in 2002. Its short version Matrilineal was shown at the International Critic's Week or Sémaine de la critique 2003 during the Cannes Film Festival. Matrilineal was awarded the Jameson Short Film Award in 2002 because of its originality "in portraying how difficult it is to overcome the often essential self-protection of blocking-out terrible events and how liberating dialogue can be. The accent within the film is not so much on the final statement, as on showing the difficult ways needed to break down self-built barriers. The movement of the excellent camerawork underlines the authenticity of the psychological process involved."

Ima is the first part of an envisaged trilogy. The second part Georg (2008), on the relationship to her German father, reiterates Klusemann's attempt to "face the past, the unspoken, with the perpetrators and their children as well as with the victims and their children."

These and her other documentaries, such as The old woman and the sea, Ménage à trois, or Dresscode have been transmitted on Arte and in South America, the US (TV5Monde, Eurochannel), the Netherlands, Poland, or Sweden.

She has also written and directed a feature-length children's film.
