= Ingrid Bachér =

German writer

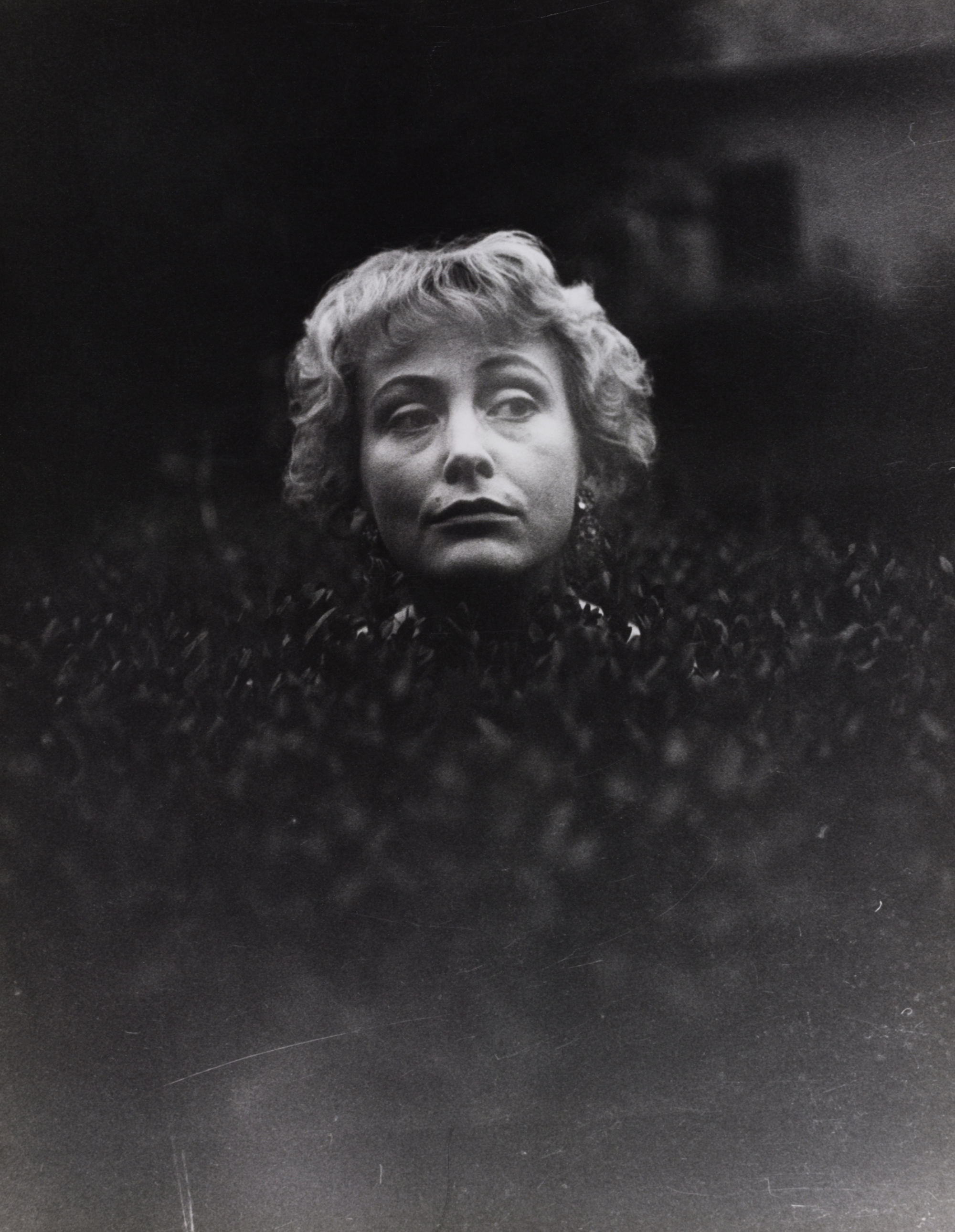
Ingrid Bachér

Ingrid Bachér (pen name for Ingrid Erben, born 24 September 1930 in Rostock) is a German writer, a former member of the Gruppe 47 and former president of the PEN Germany.

== Biography ==
Ingrid Bachér is a great-granddaughter of Theodor Storm. During her childhood she lived in Berlin, before moving to Lübeck during the last years of Second World War at her grandparents' house. After having studied at the Hochschule für Musik und Theater Hamburg, she started working as a journalist from 1949 on.

During the 1950s she travelled to Finland, Central and South America and started writing travelogues and other prose. From 1958 onwards, she had been one of the few female members of the Gruppe 47, the most important German writers' group.

From 1960 until 1967 she lived in Rome, first as a scholar of the Villa Massimo and then as a journalist. She then went to live in München, Krefeld and finally moved to Düsseldorf. She has been married to the artist Ulrich Erben since 1966 and is a mother of three children.

She has also been a member of the Verband deutscher Schriftstellerinnen und Schriftsteller (union of German authors) since 1971. From 1982 until 1996 she had been a member of the PEN Centre Germany, whose president she was shortly from 1995 until 1996, when she resigned from the presidency following the debate over the union of the West and East German PEN centres.

Ingrid Bachér has been writing books for young people, travelogues, and novels, as well as radio and television plays for the public broadcasting institutions such as the ZDF or the SWF.

== Prizes ==
- 1960: Scholarship at the Villa Massimo, Rome
- 1961: Award of sponsorship of the city of Düsseldorf
- 1964: Berlin-Scholarship of the Kulturkreises im Bundesverband der Deutschen Industrie
- 1986: Literary Prize of the GEDOK
- 1989: Kunstpreis Düsseldorf der Stadtsparkasse Düsseldorf
- 1995: Ferdinand-Lange-Kulturpreis

== Selected works ==
- Lasse Lar oder Die Kinderinsel. Story, Wiesbaden, 1958.
- Ein Weihnachtsabend. Ein Spiel für die Bühne nach Dickens. Youth play. Premiere: Ernst Deutsch Theater Hamburg, 1.12.1957, Text: Reinbek bei Hamburg, 1958.
- Schöner Vogel Quetzal. Novel, Wiesbaden, 1959.
- Karibische Fahrt. Travelogue. With photos by Herbert List, Helene Hoppenot, Fritz Henle, Karl Helbig et al., München, 1961.
- Das Karussell des Einhorns. Radio drama, BR/SWF 1962, Text: Zürich, 1979.
- Um fünf, die Stunde des Klavierspielers. Radio drama, SWF, 1963.
- Die Straße. Television drama, ZDF, 1963.
- Tiger – Tiger. Television drama, ZDF, 1964.
- Marie Celeste. Radio drama, BR 1964.
- Ich und ich. Novel, Frankfurt am Main 1964.
- Das Kinderhaus. Youth book. Illustrations by Lilo Fromm, Zürich, 1965.
- Die Ausgrabung. Radio drama, |SWF, 1965.
- Lübeck: Die Bengstraße. Radio drama, DLF, 1966.
- Ein Tag der Rückkehr. Radio drama, SWF, 1966.
- Winterliches Rom. Radio drama, DLF, 1967.
- Das Fest der Niederlage. Broadcast story, DLF, 1967.
- Ein Schiff aus Papier. Radio drama, SDR, 1967.
- Mein Kapitän ist tot. Television drama, ZDF, 1968.
- Siesta. Television drama, ZDF, 1971.
- Verletzung oder Unterweisung für eine Tochter. Television drama, ZDF, 1972.
- Rekonstruktionen einiger Augenblicke aus dem Leben meines Freundes B. am Tag vor seinem Tod. Television drama, ZDF, 1973.
- Erzähl mir nichts! Youth book. Illustrations: Bernd Jansen, Weinheim, 1974.
- Der Besuch. Youth drama. Premiere: Hannover Theater des Kindes, Juni 1974.
- Gespenster sieht man nicht. Youth book. Illustrations by Gottfried Wiegand, Zürich, 1975, Bedburg, 1997.
- Das war doch immer so. Merkbuch für Mädchen und Jungen. Geschichten, Beispiele, Texte, Zitate, Bilder und ein kleines Lexikon zum Thema Emanzipation. With illustrations by Marie Marcks and photos by Tai Lüdicke, Weinheim, 1976, 1991.
- Unterwegs zum Beginn. Stories, Krefeld, 1978.
- Morgen werde ich fliegen. Youth book, Zürich, 1979.
- Das Paar. Novel, Hamburg, 1980.
- Woldsen oder Es wird keine Ruhe geben. Novel, Hamburg, 1982.
- Die Tarotspieler. Novel, Hamburg 1986.
- Der Fußgänger. Television drama, o.O. 1987.
- Mutter Ey. Screenplay / Television drama, Köln 1988.
- Assisi verlassen. Story. With six graphics in colour by Ulrich Erben, Düsseldorf 1993.
- Schliemanns Zuhörer. Story, Düsseldorf 1995.
- Der Zuhörer. Radio drama, SWR 1999.
- Gewissen gegen Gewalt. For an Else-Lasker-Schüler-Zentrum der verfolgten Künste, Wuppertal, 1999 (together with Ignatz Bubis and Peter Finkelgruen).
- Sarajewo '96. Story. With pictorial signs by Günther Uecker, Düsseldorf 2001.
- Sieh da, das Alter. Ein Tagebuch der Annäherung, Köln 2003.
- Der Liebesverrat. Story, Köln 2005.
