= 1994 in Venezuela =

- Centuries: 18th; 19th; 20th; 21st
- Decades: 1970s; 1980s; 1990s; 2000s; 2010s
- See also: Other events of 1994; Years in Venezuela; Timeline of Venezuelan history

Events from the year 1994 in Venezuela

== Incumbents ==
- President: Ramón José Velásquez (until 2 February), Rafael Caldera (starting 2 February)

=== Governors ===
- Amazonas: Edgar Sayago Murillo
- Anzoátegui: Ovidio González then Dennis Balza Ron
- Apure: Marcelo Oquendo Rojo
- Aragua: Carlos Tablante
- Barinas: Gehard Cartay
- Bolívar: Andrés Velásquez
- Carabobo: Henrique Salas Römer
- Cojedes: José Felipe Machado
- Delta Amacuro: Emeri Mata Millán then Armando Salazar
- Falcón: Aldo Cermeño
- Guárico: José A. Malavé Risso
- Lara: José Mariano Navarro
- Mérida: Jesús Rondón Nucete
- Miranda: Arnaldo Arocha
- Monagas: Guillermo Call
- Nueva Esparta: Morel Rodríguez Ávila
- Portuguesa: Elias D'Onghia Colaprico
- Sucre: Ramón Martínez
- Táchira: José Francisco Ron Sandoval
- Trujillo: José Méndez Quijada
- Yaracuy: Nelsón Suárez Montiel
- Zulia: Lolita Aniyar de Castro

== Establishments ==
- Construction of the Basilica of Christ of José was completed.

== Births ==
- Adrian Solano (cross-country skier) in Maracay
- Renzo Zambrano in Aragua de Maturín
- Anthony Blondell in Cumaná
- Ángel González (Venezuelan footballer)
- Nediam Vargas
- José Contreras Verna in Guasdualito
- Manuel Arteaga in Maracaibo
- Robert Páez in Cumaná

== Deaths ==
- Fulgencio Aquino in Caracas
- Elsa Gramcko in Caracas
- Dalmiro Finol in Maracaibo
- Ida Gramcko in Caracas
- Gego in Caracas
- Aleksandrs Laime in Canaima
- César Tovar in Caracas
