= 1976 in Venezuela =

- Centuries: 18th; 19th; 20th; 21st
- Decades: 1950s; 1960s; 1970s; 1980s; 1990s
- See also: Other events of 1976; Years in Venezuela; Timeline of Venezuelan history

Events from the year 1976 in Venezuela

== Incumbents ==
- President: Carlos Andrés Pérez

== Births ==
- 19 August - Gabriela Jiménez Ramírez, politician

== Events ==
=== January ===
January 1

- CVG Ferrominera Orinoco commences operations.
- Petroleos de Venezuela SA (PDVSA) formally takes over the responsibilities for extraction and refining of Venezuelan oil, marking a step in the nationalization of the sector. Pre-existing companies exploiting oil resources are transformed into subsidiaries of PDVSA, such as Lagoven, Maraven, and Deltaven, among others. The nationalization process is officially initiated by President Carlos Andrés Pérez with a ceremony at Zumaque I well, the site of the 1914 oil blowout.
- A directive is issued for the restructuring of the INVEPET Foundation, leading to the establishment of the Venezuelan Petroleum Technological Institute.

January 11

- The Pueblo Nuevo Sports Center in San Cristóbal is opened, hosting a football match between Deportivo Táchira and Deportivo Cali, which concludes with a 0-0 draw.

=== February ===
- February 16 - Henry Kissinger, Secretary of State of the United States, visits the country on an official diplomatic tour.
- February 26 - The Revolutionary Commando Group abducts William Niehous, an American businessman and Vice President of Owens-Illinois. Niehous is held captive and is eventually rescued three years later.
- February 27 - The initial segment of the 1976 Simón Bolívar Cup commences in Mérida.

=== March ===
- March 2 - América de Cali wins the tournament, becoming the champion.
- March 9 - The Council of Ministers approves the Fifth National Housing Plan.
- March 16 - The Government formally acknowledges the Institute of Higher Administration Studies (IESA) as a University Institute.
- March 17 - Josip Broz Tito, President of Yugoslavia, commences a three-day official visit to the country.
- March 21 - The San Carlos International Racetrack hosts a leg of the Formula 750 World Championship, where Venezuelan racer Johnny Cecotto secures a first-place finish.

=== April ===
- April 6 - The National Art Gallery, established in 1974, officially opens to the public.
- April 8 - The Venezuelan Television Network changes its name to Venezolana de Televisión.
- April 9 - Air France launches a weekly service of its Concorde supersonic aircraft on the Paris/Charles de Gaulle to Caracas/Maiquetía route. This service continues until March 27, 1982.
- April 14 - The Terepaima Mountains are designated as a National Park.
- April 25 - Aquiles Nazoa, a noted individual, perishes in a car accident on the Central Regional Highway.

=== May ===
- May 24 - Shortly after being crowned Miss Venezuela, Elluz Peraza relinquishes her title. Judith Castillo assumes the position as the new Miss Venezuela.

=== June ===
- June 26 - The National Cooperative Center of Venezuela (CECONAVE) is founded.
- June 28 - Elena Quinteros, a Uruguayan teacher and anarchist activist previously detained by the dictatorship, is brought to the Venezuelan embassy in Montevideo under the guise of being transferred to a "contact." During this, she attempts to escape by leaping over the embassy's fence, declaring her identity and seeking asylum. However, she is forcibly removed from the premises by police and military officers, despite the intervention of diplomatic officials.

=== July ===
- July 3 - Uruguay's National Security Council denies Elena Quinteros the right to seek asylum at the Venezuelan embassy in Montevideo.
- July 6 - Venezuela severs diplomatic ties with Uruguay in response to the refusal by the Uruguayan Armed Forces to surrender Elena Quinteros to Venezuelan authorities.
- July 20 - In connection with the investigation into the Niehous kidnapping, DISIP agents detain Jorge Rodríguez, who dies in custody five days later due to torture. Octavio Lepage, the Minister of Internal Affairs at the time, expresses regret over the incident and initiates comprehensive investigations.
- July 30 - The Congress passes the Budgetary Regime Law, which establishes guidelines for the management and oversight of the public budget.

=== August ===
- August 6 - A significant flood of the Orinoco River inundates the northern region of Ciudad Bolívar, reaching a height of 18.04 meters above sea level. This marks the third highest flood level recorded in the river's history, a record that would later be surpassed in 2018.
- August 9 - The Notitarde, a newspaper based in Valencia, begins its publication.
- August 26 - Parliamentary immunity is revoked for leftist deputies Fortunato Herrera and Salom Mesa Espinoza in connection with the Niehous case.

=== September ===
- September 3 - A Venezuelan Air Force C-130 Hercules aircraft crashes near the runway of Lajes Airbase on Terceira Island, Azores, Portugal. The aircraft was transporting all members of the UCV University Choir, including Vinicio Adames. There were no survivors in the tragic accident.

=== October ===
- October 6 - A Cubana de Aviación DC 8 aircraft, en route from Maiquetía to Barbados and Trinidad with 73 passengers, explodes in mid-air due to a terrorist act. Among the passengers were numerous athletes and medical students. The attack was perpetrated by Luis Posada Carriles and Orlando Bosch Ávila from Cuba, and Venezuelans Freddy Lugo and Hernán Ricardo Lozano.
- October 15 - The King and Queen of Spain conduct an official one-day visit to Venezuela.
- October 27 - A bust honoring Father Sojo is unveiled, located between the Basilica of Santa Teresa and the National Theater in Caracas.

=== November ===
- November - The second part of the 1976 Simón Bolívar Cup commences, with its headquarters in Acarigua.

=== December ===
- December -

92 / 5,000 December December 5: The football competition ends with Alianza Lima as champion.

=== Undetermined Date ===
- Construction begins on the Museum of Culture in Valencia.
- Unemployment in Venezuela reaches an all-time low of 4%.
- The government purchases a Boeing 737-200 for use as a presidential plane, assigned the registration number F001.
- The first phase of the Centro Ciudad Comercial Tamanaco (CCCT) is inaugurated, introducing the first food court in Venezuela and Latin America.
- At the University of Los Andes, work starts on Prototype 2 of the Venezuelan Electromagnetic Train, a project slated for completion in 1980.

=== In Development ===
- Left-wing Guerrilla Insurgency: This period, spanning from 1967 to 1994, is characterized by a low-intensity phase of conflict involving various left-wing guerrilla groups.
- Greater Venezuela (1973 - 1983): A period marked by economic and social policies aimed at using petroleum wealth to foster national development and modernization.
- First Government of Carlos Andrés Pérez: Carlos Andrés Pérez's initial term as President, which included significant events and policies that shaped the nation's trajectory during his administration.

== Politics ==
- September 13- Democratic Action elects Rómulo Betancourt as the party's president for life.

== Sports ==
=== National ===
==== Baseball ====
- Venezuelan Professional Baseball League: Tigres de Aragua wins their 3rd title.

==== Soccer ====
- First Division of Venezuela: Portuguesa claims their 3rd title with Estudiantes de Mérida as the runner-up.
- Venezuelan Cup: Portuguesa FC secures their 2nd title, with Deportivo Italia finishing as runner-up.

==== Basketball ====
- Professional Basketball League of Venezuela: Panteras del Táchira wins their 1st title.

==== Rugby ====
- Venezuelan Rugby Championship: Rugby Club de Caracas wins their 1st title, with Anaucos Rugby Club as the runner-up.

==== Cycling ====
- Vuelta a Venezuela: Ramón Noriega.
- Vuelta al Táchira: Fernando Fontes.

==== International ====
- 1976 Montreal Olympic Games
  - Boxing (63.5–67 kg): Jochen Bachfeld from Germany wins gold, Pedro Gamarro from Venezuela takes silver, and Reinhard Skricek from Germany and Victor Zilberman from Romania share bronze.
- XXXI Grand Prix Classic Simon Bolivar - Horse: Naviero. Rider: Balsamino Moreira from Chile.
- World Championship of Motorcycling — 350CC World Final
  - 1st place: Walter Villa from Italy (Harley-Davidson).
- 2nd place: Johnny Cecotto from Venezuela (Yamaha).
- 3rd place: Chas Mortimer from the United Kingdom (Yamaha).
- Caracas Tournament - Winner: RC Deportivo de La Coruña from Spain.

== Awards ==
=== National Awards ===
- National Culture Awards
  - Plastic Arts: Braulio Salazar.
  - Literature: Antonia Palacios for "The Long Day Now Sure" (narrative). Juan Sánchez Peláez for "Common Features" (poetry). Orlando Araujo for "Counterpoint of Life and Death: Essay on the Poetry of Alberto Arvelo Torrealba" (essay).
  - Architecture: Carlos Gómez de Llarena, Manuel Fuentes, and Moisés Benacerraf for the design and construction of the Torre Europa, in the Sucre District.
  - Music: Fedora Alemán.
- Athlete of the Year Award: Pedro Gamarro (boxing).
- LVBP Rookie of the Year: Oswaldo Olivares, of the Navegantes del Magallanes.
- Miss Venezuela: Initially awarded to Elluz Peraza, who later resigned and was succeeded by Judith Castillo.

== Art ==
=== Painting ===
- The Farm by Jorge Chacón.
- Erosion and Marine with Boats by Elisa Elvira Zuloaga.
- The Quarry, Bolívar State by Geula Zylberman.

=== Sculpture ===
- Sphere by Gego.

== Music ==
=== Compositions ===
- Pavane and Fantasy for Guitar and Harpsichord by Antonio Lauro.
- Suggestive (waltz) and Prelude by Rodrigo Riera.

=== Releases ===
- Hugo Blanco: Bailables № 11.
- Gran Coquivacoa: The Kings of the Tamborera.
- Daniel Grau: The Orchestra of Daniel Grau.
- Henry Stephen: Eleonor/Let Me Love You.
- The Great Bonfire: We Are Not Just Another Band, When You Love Me/More, Much More.
- Orchestra Julian: Latin Fire.
- Pecos Kanvas: Let Me/Sweet Feeling.
- Mayra Martí: Dedicated to Venezuela.
- Ricardo Montaner: Seas.
- Trino Mora: Kermesse (Verbena).
- José Luis Rodríguez: A New Song.
- Aldemaro Romero: One by One, Aldemaro Romero and His New Wave, Instrumental New Wave.
- Venezuelan Rondalla: Vol. 5: Excursion Songs.
- Sexteto Juventud: And Their New Sound!.
- Los Terrícolas: In Mexico, A Dream.
- Frank Quintero: After the Storm.
- Un Dos Tres Y Fuera: Garlic, Lemon and Onion.

=== Concerts ===
- February 12: Carlos Chávez.
- July 24, Caracas: Eumir Deodato.
- October 12, Caracas: Roberto Carlos.

=== Festival Winners ===
==== OTI 1976 ====
(Held in Acapulco, Mexico)

- 1st place: Spain — Sing, Cicada by María Ostiz.
- 2nd place: Venezuela — I Am by Las Cuatro Monedas.
- 3rd place: Chile — Era Solo Un Chiquillo by José Alfredo Fuentes.

== Books ==
- The Teeth are Superfluous, by Guillermo de León Calles.
- Spirituality and Literature: a Stormy Relationship, by Juan Liscano.
- The Three Commandments of Misterdoc Fonegal, by Francisco Massiani.
- Reflections of La Rábida, by Rafael Caldera.
- Some Words, by Eugenio Montejo.
- The Networks of Always, by José Napoleón Oropeza.
- Spaces in Dissolution, by Hanni Ossott.
- From the Good Savage to the Good Revolutionary, by Carlos Rangel.
- The Bonche, by Renato Rodríguez.
- Memory of the Port, by Efraín Subero.
- In the Summer Each Word Breathes in the Summer, by Guillermo Sucre.
- Office of the Deceased, by Arturo Uslar Pietri.
- Four-Hundred-Year-Old Cities, by Cuadernos Lagoven.

== Cinema ==
- Sacred and Obscene by Román Chalbaud.
- Fever, by Alfredo Anzola, Juan Santana, and Fernando Toro.
- 300,000 Heroes, by María de Lourdes Carbonell.
- About Simon Bolivar, by Diego Risquez.
- The Dead do Come Out, by Alfredo Lugo.
- Four Years Later, by Pablo de la Barra.
- Panama, by Jesus Enrique Guédez.
- Comrade Augusto, by Enver Cordido.
- Expropriation, by Mario Robles.
- Gentle Song for a Brave People, by Giancarlo Carrer.
- The times of Castro and Gomez, by Ivork Cordido.
- June 30: I am a Criminal, by Clemente de la Cerda.

== Television ==
=== New programs ===
- VTV
  - Daily TV

=== Telenovelas ===
- RCTV
  - Angélica
  - Champions
  - Canaima
  - Carolina
  - Poor Black
  - Sabrina
- Venevisión
  - Balumba
  - Wuthering Heights
  - Mariana de la Noche
  - January 5 to November 7: La Zulianita
- VTV
  - The Woman of the Seven Moons
  - The Return
  - Páez, the Centaur of the Plain

== Theatre ==
- Cultural Event, by José Ignacio Cabrujas.
- The Game, by Mariela Romero.

== Personalities ==
=== Births ===
- January 7: Gabriel Urdaneta — soccer player.
- January 8: Raúl Olivo — actor.
- January 24: Cibell Naime — criminal.
- March 5: Hugo Vásquez — actor.
- March 15: Sacha Nairobi — actress and singer.
- April 11: Kelvim Escobar — baseball player.
- April 23: Jullye Giliberti — actress.
- May 20: Ramón Hernández — baseball player.
- June 14: Susej Vera — actress.
- July 29: Fernando De Ornelas — soccer player.
- August 26: Denyse Floreano — Miss Venezuela 1994.
- September 9: Juan Alfonso Baptista — actor.
- September 13: Vicente Ulive-Schnell — writer and philosopher.
- October 6: Consuelo Adler — model.
- October 10: Darwin González — politician.
- October 14: Carolina Tejera — actress.
- November 17: Jacqueline Aguilera — Miss World 1995.
- December 6: Alicia Machado — Miss Venezuela 1995, Miss Universe 1996.

=== Deaths ===
- January 30: Ricardo Domínguez Urbano-Taylor (b. 1903) — urban planner and journalist.
- February 17: César Prieto (b. 1882) — painter.
- April 25: Aquiles Nazoa (b. 1920) — writer, journalist and humorist.
- September 3: The 68 passengers of the FAV Hercules C-130, including the entire Orfeón Universitario and its director, Vinicio Adames (b. 1927).
- September 23: Raúl Soulés Baldó (b. 1907) — doctor and politician.
- November 22: Honorio Sigala (b. 1894) — physician and politician.

== See also ==
- History of Venezuela
