= Gramcko =

Gramcko is a surname. Notable people with the surname include:

- Adolfo Aristeguieta Gramcko (1929–1998), Venezuelan writer, medical doctor, scout leader, and diplomat
- Elsa Gramcko (1925–1994), Venezuelan sculptor and painter
- Ida Gramcko (1924–1994), Venezuelan essayist and poet
