= 1974 in Venezuela =

- Centuries: 18th; 19th; 20th; 21st
- Decades: 1950s; 1960s; 1970s; 1980s; 1990s
- See also: Other events of 1974; Years in Venezuela; Timeline of Venezuelan history

Events from the year 1974 in Venezuela

== Incumbents ==
- President:

Rafael Caldera (until March 12)
Carlos Andrés Pérez (starting March 12)

== Events ==
- 22 December – Avensa Flight 358 crashes, killing all 75 people on board

== Births ==
- 28 January – Magglio Ordóñez
- 30 January – Gilber Caro, politician
- 13 March – Luis Vallenilla, footballer
- 18 March – Carlos Baute, singer
- 16 September – César Espinoza, footballer
- 14 October – Giovanny Pérez, footballer (died 2022)
- 4 November – Carlos Mendoza, baseball player
- 12 November – Tareck El Aissami, former vice president
- 30 November – Andreina Yépez, actress (died 2026)

== Deaths ==
- 18 March – Tito Salas, painter
- 4 August – Luis Tovar, politician and unionist
- 11 August – Vicente Emilio Sojo, musicologist
- 21 August – Eduardo Schlageter, painter

== See also ==
- History of Venezuela
