= St. Christopher's Church =

St. Christopher's Church, or Saint Christopher Church, or variations, may refer to:

== Germany ==
- St. Christoph's Church, Mainz
- St. Christopher's Church (Reinhausen)

== Italy ==
- San Cristoforo, Montesperello

== United Kingdom ==
- St Christopher's Church, Bare, Lancashire, England
- Saint Christopher's Church, Boughton Lees, Kent, England
- St Christopher's Church, Ditteridge, Wiltshire, England
- St Christopher's Church, Lympsham, Somerset, England
- Church of St Christopher, Norris Green, Liverpool, England
- St Christopher's Church, Pott Shrigley, Cheshire, England
- St Christopher's Church, Sneinton, Nottingham, England
- St Christopher's Church, Southbourne, Bournemouth, Dorset, England
- St Christopher's Church, Springfield, Birmingham, England
- St Christopher le Stocks, London, England; demolished 1781

== United States ==
- St. Christopher's Church (Red Hook, New York)

== See also ==
- St. Christopher's Cathedral (disambiguation)
- St Christopher's Chapel (disambiguation)
