= 1945 in Venezuela =

- Centuries: 18th; 19th; 20th; 21st
- Decades: 1920s; 1930s; 1940s; 1950s; 1960s
- See also: Other events of 1945; Years in Venezuela; Timeline of Venezuelan history

Events in the year 1945 in Venezuela

== Incumbents ==
- President: Isaías Medina Angarita until October 18, Revolutionary Junta after October 18

== Events ==
- October 18: 1945 Venezuelan coup d'état

== Births ==
- 29 June: Lali Armengol — Spanish-born playwright, director of the Maracay University Theater.
