= Faride Mereb =

Venezuelan editor, artist (born 1989)

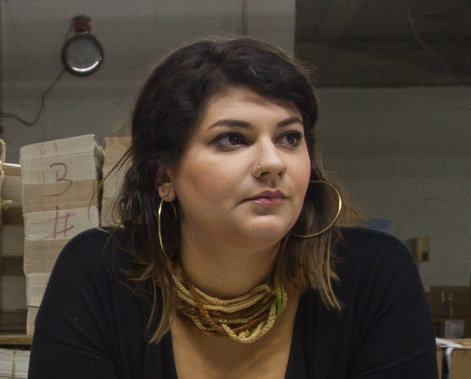
- Born: 1989 (age 36–37); Valencia, Venezuela
- Occupations: Editor and graphic designer
- Website: faridemereb.com

Faride Mereb (born 1989) is a Venezuelan editor and graphic designer. She is the founder and director of the publishing house Ediciones Letra Muerta, based in Caracas, Venezuela. In 2016 she was awarded gold in the editorial category in the Latin American Design Awards for Al Filo, by Venezuelan poet and journalist Miyó Vestrini.

== Professional career ==
Born in Valencia, she attended Instituto de Diseño de Caracas. Later, she received a full scholarship in Bachelor of Arts from the Universidad Arturo Michelena in Valencia. In 2015 Mereb started working in the publishing house Ex Libris with Javier Aizpurua. Ex Libris has won the contest of 'Best Book design From all over the World' (Leipzig, Germany) on three occasions.

Based on comprehensive research focused on the poetic work of the Venezuelan writer Miyó Vestrini, Mereb assembled and designed two books, Es una buena máquina and Al Filo, both by Vestrini, in which she collected her literary interviews and unpublished poems. Es una buena máquina was selected in the Ibero American Design Biennial of Madrid and in the Feria Iberoamericana de Arte (FIA) of 2015.

In 2014, she co-founded Ediciones Letra Muerta, a publishing house dedicated to cover relevant Venezuelan authors like Vestrini and Ida Gramcko, among others.

With Letra Muerta, Mereb published Poemas, by Ida Gramcko in 2016. This work was pre-selected in contest 'Best Book design From all over the World' (Leipzig, Germany).

Mereb has lectured on her research on Venezuelan design, at Columbia University (United States) in 2016 at the University of Palermo (Argentina). She is also member of AIGA.

== Selected works ==
- Spaces to say the same thing, by Hanni Ossott (2018).
- Otoño (sic), by Luis Moreno Villamediana (2017).
- Poemas, by Ida Gramcko (2016).
- Al Filo, by Miyó Vestrini (2015).
- Es una buena máquina, by Miyó Vestrini (2014).

== Individual exhibitions ==
- Poemas: Ida Gramcko. Abra Caracas, Los Galpones. Caracas, 2016.
- Segunda ruptura: en la memoria. Organización Nelson Garrido. Caracas, 2013.
- El espacio de la palabra, Estespacionoesmio. Valencia, 2012.
