= 1948 in Venezuela =

- Centuries: 18th; 19th; 20th; 21st
- Decades: 1920s; 1930s; 1940s; 1950s; 1960s
- See also: Other events of 1948; Years in Venezuela; Timeline of Venezuelan history

Events in the year 1948 in Venezuela

== Incumbents ==
- President: Revolutionary Junta until February 15, Rómulo Gallegos after February 15 until November 24, Military Junta after November 24

== Events ==
- November 24: 1948 Venezuelan coup d'état

== Births ==
- 19 July – Adita Riera, actress, announcer, and model.
- 28 October: Doris Wells (d. 1988) — actress.
- 12 November: Arturo Sosa Abascal — priest, 31st Superior General of the Society of Jesus.
- 28 December: Daniel Grau (d. 2021) — musician and composer.
