= Lieutenant Vicente Landaeta Gil Air Base =

Military air base in Lara, Venezuela

Lieutenant Vicente Landaeta Gil Air Base
- Base Aérea Teniente Vicente Landaeta Gil
- Part of Jacinto Lara International Airport
- Barquisimeto, Lara State in Venezuela

Site information
- Type: Military Air base
- Owner: National Bolivarian Armed Forces of Venezuela
- Operator: Bolivarian Military Aviation of Venezuela

Location
- Shown within Venezuela Lieutenant Vicente Landaeta Gil AB (South America)
- Coordinates: 10°02′48″N 69°22′08″W

Site history
- Built: 1964
- In use: 1964 - present

Garrison information
- Garrison: Air Fighter Group No. 12
- Occupants: Fighter Squadron No. 35, Fighter Squadron No. 36, Maintenance Squadron No. 127

Airfield information
- Identifiers: IATA: VLGAB, ICAO: SVBM
- Elevation: 622 metres (2,041 ft) AMSL
Runways
Direction	Length and surface
09/27	2,850 metres (9,350 ft) Asphalt

The Lieutenant Vicente Landaeta Gil Air Base (military short code BALANDA) is a Bolivarian Military Aviation of Venezuela military airbase. It was established on February 14, 1964. It uses the runway and some of the other infrastructure of Jacinto Lara International Airport, located in Barquisimeto in the state of Lara, Venezuela. It is named after a Venezuelan military pilot who died in the first aircraft crash in Venezuela.

== History ==
=== 1960s ===
On December 10, 1963, Resolution No. A-184 of the General Command of the Venezuelan Air Force (FAV) was passed, which resulted in the creation of the Lieutenant Vicente Landaeta Gil Air Base. Its most distinguished officer was a member of the First Military Aviators Promotion. This officer died in a plane crash on February 4, 1931, at the airfield in Barquisimeto. The crash was the first accident involving an aircraft in Venezuela.

On February 14, 1964, the facilities of the Lieutenant Vicente Landaeta Gil Air Base were officially opened for the B-40 Bomber Squadron, equipped with B-25 Mitchell aircraft, of the Air Bombardment Group No. 13. Simultaneously, the Police Air Squadron was activated in order to provide personnel, equipment, and protection for the facilities, as well as the operations carried out there. The honor of being its first commander was awarded to Major (Air Force) Juan Ignacio Leyzeaga, who directed the facilities until 1965, when the post was passed on to Major (Air Force) César Guerrero Zambrano. The motto of this new-born unit was "Insurance for tomorrow."

The Lieutenant Vicente Landaeta Gil Air Base was conceived as an infrastructure with all services to operate safely and efficiently at any required time, thus ensuring maximum mobility and operational capability of any weapons systems that the Venezuelan Air Force needed.

In 1968, a technological breakthrough was made when staff from this unit participated in the assembling the American F-86K aircraft in Venezuela. There was also a breakthrough in major inspections of the Canberra system, which was made abroad. The Unit participated with a bomber squadron of B-25 Mitchell aircraft in the flyby of the 48th Anniversary of Venezuelan Military Aviation, staged on the El Libertador Air Base in the city of Maracay.

In July 1969, Lt. Col. (Air Force) Rafael Sanchez Mejias took command. During this year, the Venezuelan Air Force underwent a change in its structural organization to be reformed in the following way: General Aviation Command as central control, a Department of Aviation and Inspectorate General of Aviation as advisory bodies, and implementing three executive commands: The Instruction Air Command, The Service Air Command, and the Air Combat Command. This unit was assigned to the Air Combat Command. During 1969, an unfortunate accident happened with a B-25 Mitchell aircraft in the city of Barquisimeto, where Senior Technical Sergeant (Av) Esteban Sánchez Pachano died. Over the passing years, this unit housed weapons systems such as Canberra, F-86K and F-86F; the latter being those that gave life to this operational unit and were the first aircraft assigned to the Operational Air Base Unit. This occurred in July 1971 when the Air Fighter Group No. 12 assigned this facility as its headquarters. In the course of this year, the Canberra, which had been so outstanding in this unit, was moved to Barcelona.

At the end of this year, Lt. (Av) Raga Esteban Parra entered the Heroes' Squadron after he died in the crash of an F-86F flying near the town of Sanare.

=== 1970s ===
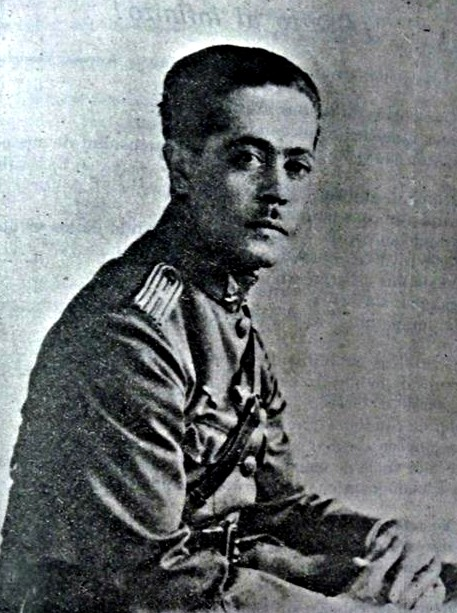
Lieutenant Vicente Landaeta Gil

During 1972, the Venezuelan Air Force weapons system acquired CF-5 aircraft that, over the years, became the operational aircraft of the air base.

In 1973, there was a serious accident in which Lieutenants Otilio Guerra Torres and José Lucena Escalona, Bolivian Air Force sergeant Carlos Colmenares Parada, Venancio Chávez, and aero-technician Orlando Loaiza died. Their plane, a B-25 Mitchell, crashed near the town of Tapipa in the state of Miranda.

In 1974, the Air Fighter Group No. 12 was permanently transferred to Barquisimeto, becoming the operating unit of the Lieutenant Vicente Landaeta Gil Air Base. Its main objective was to conduct operations against opposing air forces, provide air support, and help fulfill the mission of the Venezuelan Air Force. It was not until July 1974 when the planes were permanently transferred to the Lieutenant Vicente Gil Landaeta Air Base, where they have been operating ever since. The arrival of the CF-5 aircraft, along with the Canadian training school, radically changed the instruction and training of fighter pilots that had existed in the Venezuelan Air Force, introducing new techniques and knowledge.

In 1976, through the Garrison Housing Institute of the Armed Forces, a housing plan came into effect which made it possible to build houses at the Lieutenant Vicente Gil Landaeta military installation.

During 1977, through the improvement plans for military and civilian personnel of the armed forces, administrative offices were created in the air force. Based on its function, an office was created for the air base. That same year, a crash occurred in which Major (Av) Rafael Penaloza Mota and Sub-Lieutenant (Av) Franco Paternóster Orofino died. This happened on September 21 in the state of Lara while they were taking a training flight in a VF-5D.

In 1978, auxiliary corps of the Venezuelan Air Force were created, the Cuerpos Auxiliar de Fuerza Area Venezolano, better known by the initials CAFAV. These bodies were composed of people who assisted aeronautical activities in the country. They were trained and monitored by the Air Force to fulfill air operations in an emergency or at the request of the command. This base was assigned the control of Auxiliary Group No. 3.

In 1979, modification of the navigation and communications equipment was made on the CF-5 aircraft, since then called the VF-5.

=== 1980s ===
In November 1986, the Venezuelan Air Force conducted an organizational change of Air Groups which resulted in a transformation from Fighter Squadron No.35 of the Air Fighter Group No.12 to Squadron Combat School No. 35 . During February 1987, a new Squadron Weapons System T-2D was assigned to this unit; it was part of the Air Training Group. Its first Commander was Major (Av) Arnoldo Certain Gallardo. This squadron had the responsibility of training Air Force fighter pilots that would feed Fighter Units such as the Air Fighter Groups No.11 (Mirage Aircraft 50), No.12 (VF-5 Aircraft), and No.16 (F-16 Aircraft), respectively.

=== 1990s ===
During 1991, the Venezuelan Air Force implemented a program called "Programme Grifo" for modernization of the VF-5 aircraft. This update involved the modification of the navigation and communication system for an electronic integrated navigation/attack system.

In 1997, there were further organizational changes within the Venezuelan Air Force. The Lieutenant Vicente Gil Landaeta Air Base became the Headquarters of Air Zone II. This was in accordance with the provisions of the Ministry of Defense Resolution FAV No. 2276, dated February 25, 1997. The first commander of this area was Brigadier General (Av) Lester Luis Lopez Ordaz.

=== 2000s ===
In 2000, a VF-5 number 9348 aircraft, piloted by Captain (Av) Ricardo Fernández Rizo, crashed. There was a mechanical failure, so he had to eject near the town of Quíbor in the state of Lara. No casualties occurred.

Also during this period, the Venezuelan Air Force held its Forty-Seventh Anniversary in El Libertador Air Base, located in Maracay, Aragua. In the corresponding ceremony at Lieutenant Vicente Gil Landaeta Air Base, Lieutenant Colonel (Av) César Guerrero Zambrano, Unit Commander, as an act of singular importance, imposed antique buttons and gave honorable mentions to civilian personnel (FAV), who with loyalty, discipline and good conduct, had devoted much of their lives to the enhancement of the Venezuelan Air Force. Also, a military parade and air show was performed.

In 2010, the air base received the first Chinese fighter training aircraft Hongdu K8W that included a monitoring and diagnostic system. President Hugo Chavez was present for the arrival of the planes.

On February 14, 2014, a ceremony was held to mark fifty years since the air-base opened. The ceremony was inaugurated by the Major General José Manuel Duque Marin and assisted by various other associated organizations. There was an awarding of medals, bars, and buttons to military and civilian staff, including the awarding of The Cross of the Venezuelan Air Force to General Octavio Augusto Cesar Chacon and General Figueira Peralta.

== Organization ==
=== Aircraft ===
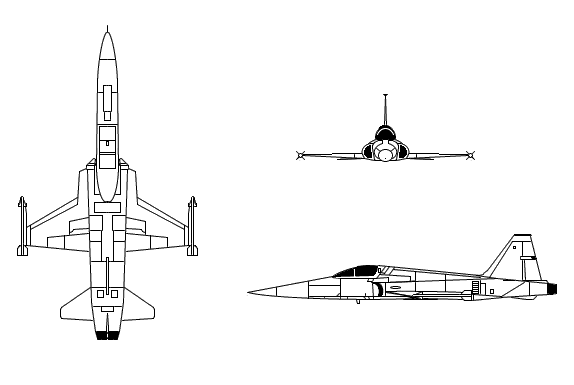
Canadair / Northrop F-5 Freedom Fighter

- Canadair / Northrop CF-5A
- Canadair / Northrop RCF-5A
- Canadair / Northrop CF-5D
- Canadair / Northrop NF-5A
- Canadair / Northrop NF-5B
- Beechcraft A65-B80 Queen Air
- Hongdu K-8W Karakorum
