= Faride =

Faride is a given name. Notable people with the name include:

- Faride Alidou (born 2001), German footballer
- Faride Mereb (born 1989), Venezuelan editor and graphic designer
- Faride Raful (born 1979), Dominican Republic lawyer
