= Firearms regulation in Venezuela =

Overview article

Firearms have been subject to government control and regulation in Venezuela since 1914.

== History ==
During the dictatorship of Juan Vicente Gómez, in 1914, a disarmament decree in the Federal District was enacted, and later in 1919, a disarmament law was decreed, ordering every weapon owner to surrender them to the authorities; the only exceptions were machetes and hunting shotguns. The official justification was to reduce crime, but the law was ultimately used to disarm the population and to prevent possible uprisings. Historian Manuel Caballero argued that while Gómez's final intention was to prevent his enemies from obtaining weapons, the law helped to prevent civil wars in Venezuela for the next century.

In 2012, Venezuela banned private sales of firearms and ammunition with the intention of lowering crime rates. The army, police, and certain groups trusted by the government (colectivos) are exempt from the ban and can buy firearms from state-owned manufacturers. In 2013 Venezuela stopped issuing new firearm licenses, and in 2017, the government banned the carrying of firearms in public places. The government declared that more than 15,000 firearms were confiscated in 2018. Sixty disarmament centres were created in the country and the penalty for illegal firearm possession was raised to twenty years imprisonment.

According to the government, the only people who should carry guns are government agents.

== See also ==
- Overview of gun laws by nation
