= 1898 in Venezuela =

- Centuries: 18th; 19th; 20th; 21st
- Decades: 1870s; 1880s; 1890s; 1900s; 1910s
- See also: Other events of 1898; Years in Venezuela; Timeline of Venezuelan history

Events in the year 1898 in Venezuela.

== Incumbents ==
- President: Joaquin Crespo until February 28, Ignacio Andrade

== Births ==
- 9 January: Julio Garmendia (d. 1977) — writer, journalist and diplomat.
- 11 April: Conny Méndez (d. 1979) — composer, singer, essayist, cartoonist, actress and writer.
- 19 June: Juan Bautista Plaza (d. 1965) — composer of modernist music.
- 19 July – Gustavo Machado Morales, politician and journalist (d. 1983)
- Rafael Ángel Rondón Márquez (d. 1966) — historian.

== Deaths ==
- 16 April - Joaquin Crespo
- 29 July: Arturo Michelena (b. 1863) — painter.
