= 1859 in Venezuela =

- Centuries: 19th; 20th; 21st
- Decades: 1830s; 1840s; 1850s; 1860s; 1870s
- See also: Other events of 1859; Years in Venezuela; Timeline of Venezuelan history

Events in the year 1859 in Venezuela.

== Incumbents ==
- President: Julian Castro until August 2, Pedro Gual Escandón until September 29, Manuel Felipe de Tovar

== Events ==
- January 20 - beginning of the Federal War between the Government of Venezuela and the federalists
- September 2 - combat of Maiquetia
- December 10 - Federal War: Battle of Santa Inés
