= Basilica of Christ of José =

- Basílica del Cristo de José
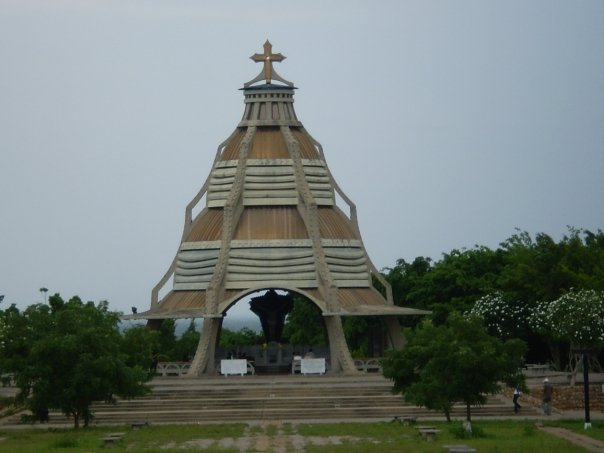

- Location within Venezuela
- Basilica of Christ of José
- 10°04′45″N 64°55′31″W
- Location: Barcelona
- Country: Venezuela
- Denomination: Roman Catholic Church

The Basilica of Christ of José (Spanish: Basílica del Cristo de José) Also called sometimes Church of the Christ of the Travelers is a religious building of the Catholic Church in the way that communicates to the city of Barcelona, capital of the Anzoátegui State with the locality of Píritu, both in the metropolitan area of Barcelona, to the northwest of the country South American country of Venezuela. It was privately built in thanksgiving for "favors received", To seven kilometers of the highway of the time (Cryogenic of José).

It has a metallic bronze dome above a structure without walls. It has gardens and a parking. From the 2 of August 1994 owns a figure of Christ which the locals relate with numerous histories. It is patrimony of the Anzoátegui state from the same year. Every year in November, there are Catholic processions to the basilica presided over by the Bishop of Barcelona.

== See also ==
- List of Basilicas in South America
- Roman Catholicism in Venezuela
- St. Christopher's Cathedral (Barcelona, Venezuela)

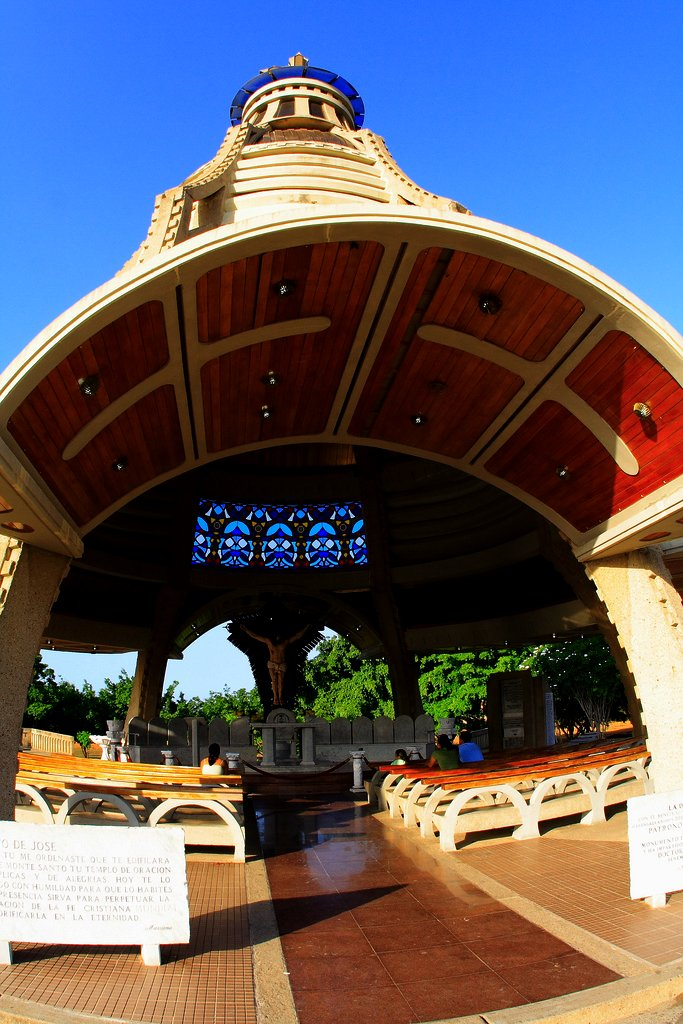
Internal view
