= Mariscal Sucre Air Base =

Mariscal Sucre Air Base
- Base Aérea Mariscal Sucre
- Maracay, Aragua in Venezuela

Site information
- Type: Military Air base
- Owner: National Bolivarian Armed Forces of Venezuela
- Operator: Bolivarian Military Aviation of Venezuela

Location
- Shown within Venezuela Mariscal Sucre AB (South America)
- Coordinates: 10°14′59″N 067°38′58″W

Airfield information
- Identifiers: ICAO: SVBS
- Elevation: 408 metres (1,339 ft) AMSL
Runways
Direction	Length and surface
05/23	1,300 metres (4,265 ft) Concrete
11/29	1,995 metres (6,545 ft) Concrete

Mariscal Sucre Air Base (Spanish: Base Aérea Mariscal Sucre; ICAO: SVBS) is a military airport and base for the Bolivarian Military Aviation of Venezuela. It is located in Maracay, Aragua, Venezuela.

The air base is home to both Escuadrón 142 Básico and Escuadrón 143 Tactico which fly the Embraer EMB 312 Tucano.
