= 1875 in Venezuela =

- Centuries: 18th; 19th; 20th; 21st
- Decades: 1850s; 1860s; 1870s; 1880s; 1890s
- See also: Other events of 1875; Years in Venezuela; Timeline of Venezuelan history

Events in the year 1875 in Venezuela

== Incumbents ==
- President: Antonio Guzmán Blanco

== Events ==
- 28 October: Inauguration of the National Pantheon.

== Births ==
- 11 October: Carlos Brandt (d. 1964) — writer, philosopher and scientific communicator.

== Deaths ==
- 19 August: Francisco Delgado Jugo (b. 1830) — ophthalmologist.
