= 1977 in Venezuela =

- Centuries: 19th; 20th; 21st
- Decades: 1950s; 1960s; 1970s; 1980s; 1990s
- See also: Other events of 1977; Years in Venezuela; Timeline of Venezuelan history

Events from the year 1977 in Venezuela

== Incumbents ==
- President: Carlos Andrés Pérez

== Events ==
- April 18 – Due to shortages, President Carlos Andrés Pérez approves the importation of basic foodstuffs.
- June 23 – Venezuela ratifies the American Convention on Human Rights.
- July 31 – the Caricuao Zoo Park opens to the public.
- September 4 – San Cristóbal: Francesco Moser becomes road cycling world champion

== Births ==
- March 25 – Édgar Ramírez, actor
- April 20 – Alejandro Cichero, footballer
- May 23 – Tomás Gil, racing cyclist
- August 30 – Alexander Rondón, footballer and manager
- September 15 – Fabiola Ramos, table tennis player
- November 4 – Héctor González, footballer
