= 1908 in Venezuela =

- Centuries: 18th; 19th; 20th; 21st
- Decades: 1880s; 1890s; 1900s; 1910s; 1920s
- See also: Other events of 1908; Years in Venezuela; Timeline of Venezuelan history

Events in the year 1908 in Venezuela

== Incumbents ==
- President: Cipriano Castro until December 19, Juan Vincente Gomez

== Events ==
- November 26-December 23: Dutch-Venezuela War
- December 19: Coup d'état led by Juan Vicente Gómez

== Births ==
- 30 November: José Antonio de Armas Chitty (d. 1995) — historian, poet, chronicler, essayist, biographer and researcher.
