= Captain Manuel Ríos Aerospace Base =

Military air base in Guárico, Venezuela

Captain Manuel Ríos Aerospace Base
- Base Aero-Espacial Capitán Manuel Ríos.
- Barbacoas, Aragua in Venezuela

Site information
- Type: Military Air base
- Owner: National Bolivarian Armed Forces of Venezuela
- Operator: Bolivarian Military Aviation of Venezuela

Location
- Shown within Venezuela Captain Manuel Ríos AB (South America)
- Coordinates: 09°22′20″N 66°55′23″W

Airfield information
- Identifiers: ICAO: SVCZ
- Elevation: 160 metres (525 ft) AMSL
Runways
| Direction | Length and surface |
|---|---|
| 08/26 | 2,700 metres (8,858 ft) Concrete |

Captain Manuel Ríos Aerospace Base (Spanish: Base Aero-Espacial Capitán Manuel Ríos.; ICAO: SVCZ) is a military airport and base for the Bolivarian Military Aviation of Venezuela. It is located in Barbacoas, Aragua, Venezuela.

The air base is home to both Escuadrón 33 and Escuadrón 34 which fly the Sukhoi Su-30MK2V.
