= 1975 in Venezuela =

- Centuries: 18th; 19th; 20th; 21st
- Decades: 1950s; 1960s; 1970s; 1980s; 1990s
- See also: Other events of 1975; Years in Venezuela; Timeline of Venezuelan history

Events from the year 1975 in Venezuela

== Incumbents ==
- President: Carlos Andrés Pérez

== Events ==
- June 25: For the first time in its history, the Miss Venezuela pageant is held at Poliedro de Caracas. The winner is Maritza Pineda, Miss Nueva Esparta.
- December 21: Venezuelan-born Carlos the Jackal masterminds the OPEC siege in Vienna.
- unknown date:
  - The Centro de Investigaciones de Astronomia is founded in honour of Francisco J. Duarte, who died in 1972.
  - José Antonio Abreu founds El Sistema, a music education programme.

== Sport ==
- Portuguesa FC win the 1975 Venezuelan Primera División season.

== Births ==
- January 29: Karin Salanova, Venezuelan politician

== Deaths ==
- August 16: Carlos Raúl Villanueva, modernist architect (born 1900)

== See also ==
- History of Venezuela
