= General-in-Chief José Antonio Páez Air Base =

General-in-Chief José Antonio Páez Air Base
- Base Aérea General en Jefe José Antonio Páez
- Puerto Ayacucho, Amazonas in Venezuela

Site information
- Type: Military Air base
- Owner: National Bolivarian Armed Forces of Venezuela
- Operator: Bolivarian Military Aviation of Venezuela

Location
- Shown within Venezuela General-in-Chief José Antonio Páez AB (South America)
- Coordinates: 05°37′12″N 67°36′22″W

Airfield information
- Identifiers: ICAO: SVPA
Runways
Direction	Length and surface
03/21	2,520 metres (8,268 ft) Concrete

General-in-Chief José Antonio Páez Air Base (Spanish: Base Aérea General en Jefe Rafael Urdaneta; ICAO: SVPA) is a military airport and base for the Bolivarian Military Aviation of Venezuela. It is located in Puerto Ayacucho, Amazonas, Venezuela.

The air base is home to Escuadrón 91 which fly the Cessna 206.
