= 1903 in Venezuela =

- Centuries: 18th; 19th; 20th; 21st
- Decades: 1880s; 1890s; 1900s; 1910s; 1920s
- See also: Other events of 1903; Years in Venezuela; Timeline of Venezuelan history

Events in the year 1903 in Venezuela.

== Incumbents ==
- President: Cipriano Castro

== Events ==
- January 17 - Venezuela Crisis of 1902-1903: Bombardment of Fort San Carlos
