= 1897 in Venezuela =

- Centuries: 18th; 19th; 20th; 21st
- Decades: 1870s; 1880s; 1890s; 1900s; 1910s
- See also: Other events of 1897; Years in Venezuela; Timeline of Venezuelan history

Events in the year 1897 in Venezuela.

== Incumbents ==
- President: Ignacio Andrade

== Events ==
- 28 January – Early film screenings are held at the Baralt Theatre in Maracaibo, the premiere of the first Venezuelan films
- 2 February – The Treaty of Washington between Venezuela and the United Kingdom is signed, towards the end of the Venezuelan crisis of 1895.
- 28 July – The Roman Catholic Archdiocese of Maracaibo is established.

== Births ==
- 4 August – José Nucete Sardi (d. 1972) — historian, journalist and diplomat.
- 15 September – Mario Briceño Iragorry (d. 1979) — writer, historian and teacher.
- 28 November: Félix Armando Núñez (d. 1972) — poet, essayist and literary critic.
