= Lieutenant Luis del Valle Garcia Air Base =

Lieutenant Luis del Valle Garcia Air Base
- Base Aérea Teniente Luis del Valle García
- Part of General José Antonio Anzoátegui International Airport
- Barcelona, Anzoátegui in Venezuela

Site information
- Type: Military Air base
- Owner: National Bolivarian Armed Forces of Venezuela
- Operator: Bolivarian Military Aviation of Venezuela

Location
- Shown within Venezuela Lieutenant Luis del Valle Garcia AB (South America)
- Coordinates: 10°06′26″N 64°41′21″W

Airfield information
- Identifiers: ICAO: SVBC
- Elevation: 8 metres (26 ft) AMSL
Runways
Direction	Length and surface
02/20	3,100 metres (10,171 ft) Concrete
15/33	3,150 metres (10,335 ft) Concrete

Lieutenant Luis del Valle Garcia Air Base (Spanish: Base Aérea Teniente Luis del Valle García; ICAO: SVBC) is a military airport and base for the Bolivarian Military Aviation of Venezuela. It is located in Barcelona, Anzoátegui, Venezuela.

The air base is home to both Escuadrón 131 and Escuadrón 132 which fly the Sukhoi Su-30MK2V.
