= 1895 in Venezuela =

- Centuries: 18th; 19th; 20th; 21st
- Decades: 1870s; 1880s; 1890s; 1900s; 1910s
- See also: Other events of 1895; Years in Venezuela; Timeline of Venezuelan history

Events in the year 1895 in Venezuela.

== Incumbents ==
- President: Joaquín Crespo

== Events ==
- February 22 - Venezuela Crisis of 1895: United States President Grover Cleveland signs into law U.S. House Resolution 252, recommending Venezuela and the United Kingdom settle the dispute by arbitration.
- December 17 - Venezuela Crisis of 1895: U.S. President Cleveland asks the U.S. Congress to fund a commission to study the boundaries between Venezuela and British Guiana
- December 18 - Venezuela Crisis of 1895: the U.S. Congress approved $100,000 for the United States Commission on the Boundary Between Venezuela and British Guiana
