= General-in-Chief Rafael Urdaneta Air Base =

General-in-Chief Rafael Urdaneta Air Base
- Base Aérea General en Jefe Rafael Urdaneta
- Part of La Chinita International Airport
- Maracaibo, Zulia in Venezuela

Site information
- Type: Military Air base
- Owner: National Bolivarian Armed Forces of Venezuela
- Operator: Bolivarian Military Aviation of Venezuela

Location
- Shown within Venezuela General-in-Chief Rafael Urdaneta AB (South America)
- Coordinates: 10°33′30″N 71°43′40″W

Airfield information
- Identifiers: ICAO: SVMC
- Elevation: 72 metres (236 ft) AMSL
Runways
Direction	Length and surface
02L/20R	2,990 metres (9,810 ft) Concrete
02R/20L	2,495 metres (8,186 ft) Concrete

General-in-Chief Rafael Urdaneta Air Base (Spanish: Base Aérea General en Jefe Rafael Urdaneta; (ICAO: SVMC) is a military airport and base for the Bolivarian Military Aviation of Venezuela. It is located in Maracaibo, Zulia, Venezuela.

The air base is home to Escuadrón 152 which fly the Hongdu K-8VV.
