= Lieutenant Colonel Teófilo Luis Méndez Air Base =

Lieutenant Colonel Teófilo Luis Méndez Air Base
- Base Aérea Teniente Coronel Teófilo Luis Méndez
- Part of Manuel Carlos Piar Guayana Airport
- Ciudad Guayana, Bolívar in Venezuela

Site information
- Type: Military Air base
- Owner: National Bolivarian Armed Forces of Venezuela
- Operator: Bolivarian Military Aviation of Venezuela

Location
- Shown within Venezuela Lieutenant Colonel Teófilo Luis Méndez AB (South America)
- Coordinates: 08°17′05″N 62°45′50″W

Airfield information
- Identifiers: ICAO: SVPR
- Elevation: 144 metres (472 ft) AMSL
Runways
Direction	Length and surface
07/25	2,050 metres (6,726 ft) Concrete

Lieutenant Colonel Teófilo Luis Méndez Air Base (Spanish: Base Aérea Teniente Coronel Teófilo Luis Méndez;) is a military airport and base for the Bolivarian Military Aviation of Venezuela. It is located in Ciudad Guayana, Bolívar, Venezuela.

The air base is home to Escuadrón 171 which fly the Mil Mi-17V-5.
