= 1902 in Venezuela =

- Centuries: 18th; 19th; 20th; 21st
- Decades: 1880s; 1890s; 1900s; 1910s; 1920s
- See also: Other events of 1902; Years in Venezuela; Timeline of Venezuelan history

Events in the year 1902 in Venezuela.

== Incumbents ==
- President: Cipriano Castro

== Events ==
- January – Venezuela Crisis of 1902–03: Kaiser Wilhelm II of Germany declares a delay to any blockade due to the outbreak of another civil war in Venezuela (led by financier Manuel Matos) which raised the possibility of a more amenable government.
- June – Venezuela Crisis of 1902–03: President Castro seizes a British ship, The Queen, on suspicion of aiding rebels, in another phase of the Venezuelan civil war
- July – the German government was ready to return to the possibility of joint action, with Matos' insurrection having led to further abuses against German citizens and their property, including by government troops
- mid-August – Britain and Germany agreed in principle to go ahead with a blockade later in the year.
- December 7 – both Britain and Germany issued ultimatums to Venezuela, even though there was still disagreement about whether to impose a pacific blockade (as the Germans wanted) or a war blockade (as the British wanted)
- December 11 – Italy offered its own ultimatum, which Venezuela also rejected
- December 13 – British merchant vessel had been boarded and its crew briefly arrested, the British demanded an apology, and failing to receive it, launched a bombardment of Venezuelan forts at Puerto Cabello, assisted by the German SMS Vineta.
- December 16 – Italian naval contingent arrived in support of the blockade
- December 20 – the British notice of an official blockade was published

== Births ==
- January 10 – Gonzalo Barrios, politician (died 1993)
- June 24 – Juan Antonio Yanes, professional baseball pioneer (died 1987)

== Deaths ==
- December 17 – Martín Tovar y Tovar, artist (born 1827)
