= 1988 in Venezuela =

- Centuries: 18th; 19th; 20th; 21st
- Decades: 1960s; 1970s; 1980s; 1990s; 2000s
- See also: Other events of 1988; Years in Venezuela; Timeline of Venezuelan history

Events from the year 1988 in Venezuela

== Incumbents ==
- President: Jaime Lusinchi
- Vice-president: none - title in abeyance

== Events ==
- October 29 – Massacre of El Amparo: 14 fishermen are killed by a joint military-police unit.
- December 4 – In the 1988 Venezuelan general election, Carlos Andrés Pérez of Democratic Action is elected president with 52.9% of the vote, while Democratic Action win the most seats in the Chamber of Deputies and Senate, on a turnout of 81.9% in the presidential election and 81.7% in the Congressional elections.

== Births ==
- February 8 – Andreína Tarazón, politician
- June 8 – Reinaldo Zavarce, actor and singer
- June 10 – Milagro Valero, politician
- October 26 – Nosliw Rodríguez, politician
- Yendri Sánchez, known for breaking into public acts of various personalities

== Deaths ==
- November 26 – Antonio Estévez, composer (born 1916)
