= 1976 Venezuelan Air Force C-130 crash =

1976 Lockheed C-130 crash in Portugal

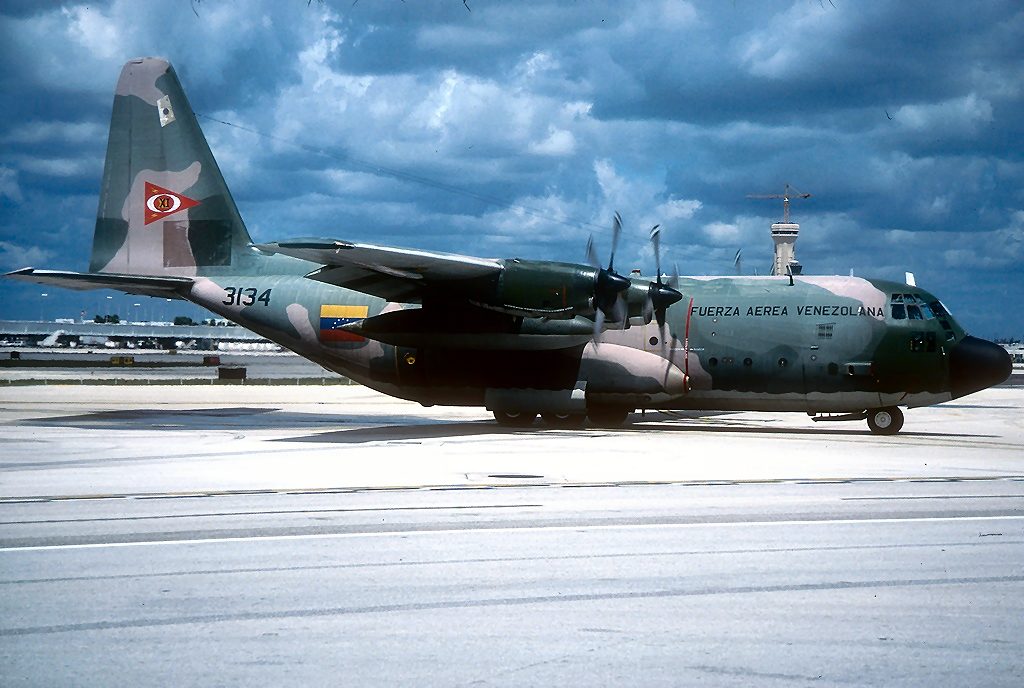
- A C-130H of the Venezuelan Air Force, similar to the one that crashed.

Accident
- Date: 3 September 1976
- Summary: Controlled flight into terrain
- Site: Near Lajes Airbase, Terceira Island, Azores Archipelago, Portugal

Aircraft
- Aircraft type: Lockheed C-130H Hercules
- Operator: Bolivarian Military Aviation of Venezuela
- Registration: FAV-7772
- Flight origin: Simón Bolívar International Airport, Venezuela
- 1st stopover: El Libertador Air Base, Maracay, Venezuela
- 2nd stopover: Naval Air Station Bermuda, St. David's Island, Bermuda
- 3rd stopover: Lajes Airbase, Azores, Portugal
- 4th stopover: Barcelona, Spain
- Last stopover: France
- Destination: United Kingdom
- Occupants: 68
- Passengers: 58
- Crew: 10
- Fatalities: 68
- Survivors: 0

On 3 September 1976, a Lockheed C-130H Hercules aircraft of the Venezuelan Air Force crashed on a hill just outside the runway of Lajes Field on Terceira Island in the Azores Archipelago while carrying out approach maneuvers under heavy rain associated with Hurricane Emmy, killing all 68 people on board. The Hercules was transporting members of the University Choir of the Central University of Venezuela to Barcelona, Spain to participate in a choral event. The crash is also known as the Tragedy of the Azores or the Tragedy of the University Orfeón.

== Aircraft ==
The aircraft involved was a Lockheed C-130H Hercules with registration FAV-7772, serial number 4408, property of the Venezuelan Air Force. It was manufactured in 1971 and had been operating in the country for five years and was assigned to Air Transport Group No. 6.

== Accident ==
=== Background ===
The reason for the Central University of Venezuela's choir's trip was to go to Barcelona for the International Festival of Choral Singing set to begin on 4 September 1976. The university had been invited to the festival two years prior. The total cost of the flight with Venezuela's flag carrier Viasa amounted to 300,000 Venezuelan bolívars and the Central University of Venezuela did not have such resources. The choir consisted of a total of 52 members, which resulted in a cost of between Bs 5,500 and Bs 6,000 per ticket.

As they were unable to pay for the flight, the choir members, with the approval of their director Vinicio Adames, organized themselves into a commission, and through the representative of the Federation of University Centers they requested support from the Venezuelan Air Force in a meeting with President of Venezuela Carlos Andrés Pérez. The military offered a Lockheed C-130H Hercules transport plane to fly to Europe. It was not the first time that the FAV supported the choir on a tour, as it had previously happened in 1959. The route taken was also commonly used for refueling spare parts for the military aeromotor fleet of the time.

Flight

The Air Transport Group No. 6 received the order to schedule a flight to Europe in which the members of the University Choir would go as passengers at the end of August 1976. When requesting the weather reports, they found out that there was a tropical storm over the Azores and that the Lajes Airbase, a mandatory stopover of the transfer, was closed. This forced the flight to be suspended several times. However, due to pressure from the choir's director Vinicio Adames towards the dean of the university and President Pérez, the Venezuelan Air Force organized a route with a stopover at North American Naval Air Base Bermuda (now L.F. Wade International Airport) on Saint David Island, Bermuda. From there, they continued towards the Azores, 1,866 nautical miles away. From the Azores they planned to go to Barcelona, 1,347 nautical miles away. From there the FAV C-130H would continue its flight to France and the United Kingdom, where they would drop off another of its passengers, Colonel Alfredo Ramírez G., aeronautical attaché in London, along with his wife and son. If they had been unable to reach the Azores, the alternate airport would have been Lisbon Airport, located 841 nautical miles from Lajes, for a total of 2,707 nautical miles from Bermuda. The flight would have been carried out by 2 full crews consisting of 5 members each.

The Hercules left Maiquetía for the Libertador Base in Palo Negro, Aragua for minor technical touches and from there it continued as planned to Bermuda. Upon arrival in Bermuda, fuel was supplied, the flight plan was registered and the weather forecast was requested, which reported that the storm was ongoing and that at the time of arrival at Lajes the airport would be below minimum levels. This led to the decision to make the crew and passengers spend time in accommodation available on the base and in the residences located around it until the improvement of the conditions. Shortly before this was to be completed, the air base personnel informed the C-130H pilots that, according to a report received, at the time of arrival of the flight at the Azores the runway would be clear. With this new information, the aircraft took off from Bermuda Naval Air Base.

Nine hours later, upon arriving at Terceira Island, there was zero visibility and the base was below minimum levels. According to press reports at the time, when the pilots communicated with the control tower, they were answered by a Portuguese soldier who did not know English. On the third attempt to land, the aircraft crashed 200 meters from the runway. There was no explosion since there was no fuel in the tanks, but due to the violence of the impact, there were no survivors.
