= Miyó Vestrini =

Venezuelan poet, journalist and scriptwriter

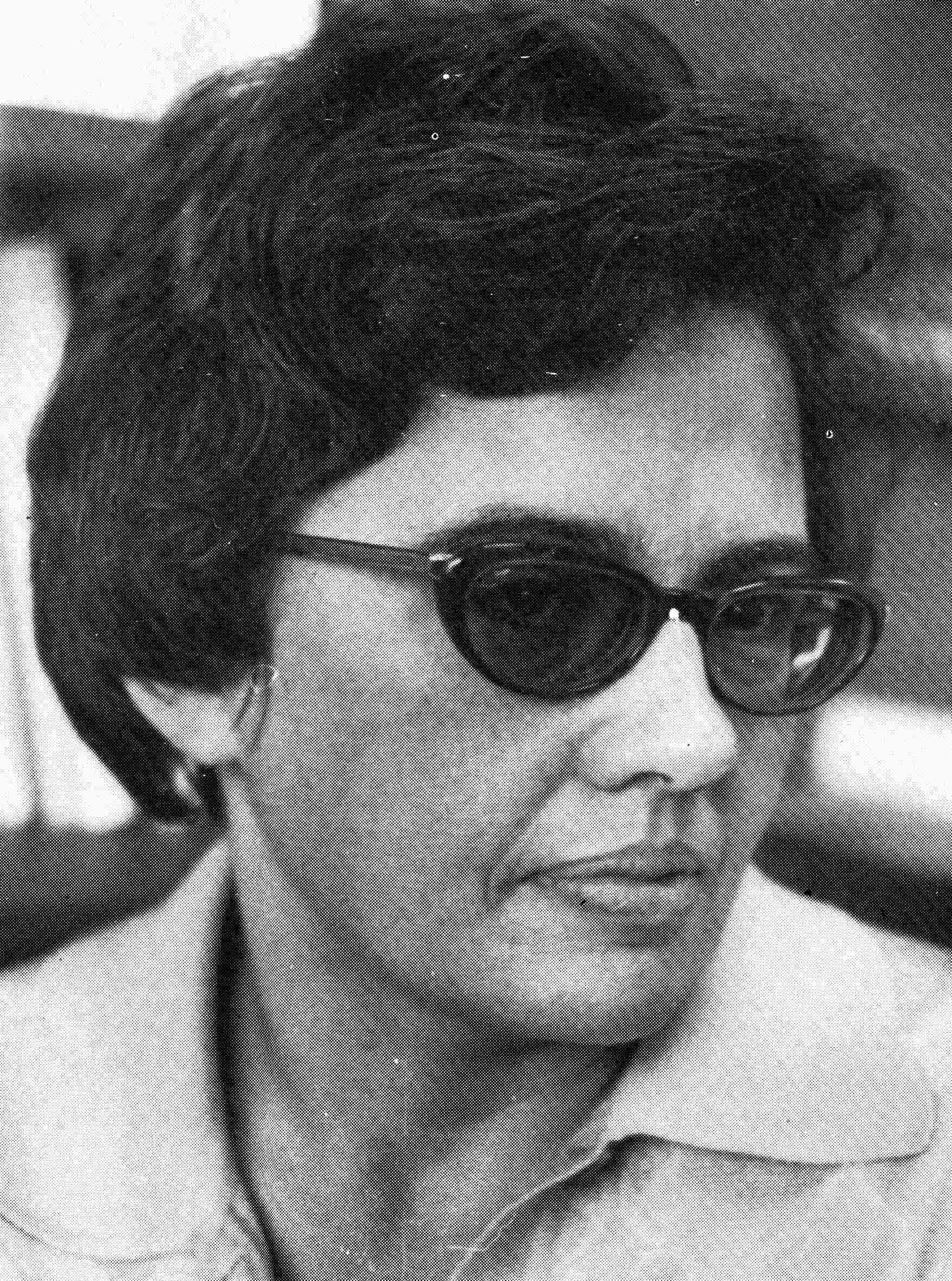
- Born: Marie-José Fauvelle Ripert; April 27, 1938; Nîmes, France
- Died: November 29, 1991 (aged 53); Caracas, Venezuela
- Occupations: Journalist, poet
- Known for: Literary groups: El techo de la Ballena, Sardio, Apocalipsis, 40 grados a la sombra
- Partner: Pedro Llorens
- Children: 2

Marie-José Fauvelle Ripert, best known as Miyó Vestrini (Nîmes, France 1938 – Caracas, Venezuela 1991) was a Venezuelan poet, journalist and scriptwriter.

== Biography ==
When Vestrini was a young girl, she emigrated to Venezuela with her mother, beginning a “second childhood” in the Venezuelan Andes. From an early age, she was dedicated to cultural journalism and took part in the groups, El Techo de la Ballena, Sardio, La República del Este in Caracas and Apocalipsis in Maracaibo. She was a press officer at the Venezuelan embassy in Italy and press chief of the Venezuelan Ministry of Foreign Affairs. She anchored a radio program called Al pie de la letra. In Venezuela, she directed the art section of the newspaper El Nacional and Criticarte magazine. As a columnist, she took part in El Diario de Caracas, La República and El Universal. She also worked as a television screenwriter. Her creations show a constant struggle between her French roots and the Latin American environment.

Her poetry is intense and explosive. Her prose works stand out for being dense and moving around several levels of conflict. Her poetry and prose show the same wild character and a bold expression. Her writing embodies an ironic and direct level of language that expresses substantial cynicism. Enriquez Hernández said about her: “Miyó was a suicidal woman and that has to do with her poetry, because it is very disjointed, full of that world of protest, claim”.

== Work ==
=== Poetry ===
- Las historias de Giovanna (1971)
- El invierno próximo (1975)
- Pocas virtudes (1986)
- Todos los poemas (Posthumous. First edition, 1994. Second edition, 2013)
- Es una buena máquina (Posthumous, 2014)
- In Translation to English: Grenade in Mouth: Some Poems of Miyó Vestrini (Posthumous, 2019. Translated by Anne Boyer and Cassandra Gillig. Edited by Faride Mereb and Elisa Maggi.)

=== Prose ===
- Órdenes al corazón (Posthumous, 2001)
- Biographies
- Más que la hija de un presidente: Sonia Pérez (1979)
- Isaac Chocrón frente al espejo (1980)
- Salvador Garmendia, pasillo de por medio (Póstumo, 1994)

=== Literary Interviews ===
- Al filo (2015).

=== About her work ===
- Miyó Vestrini, el encierro del espejo (2002)
- Miyó Vestrini (2008)
- Estados del cuerpo y de la lengua: Los malestares de Miyó Vestrini (2008)
