= St Christopher's Chapel =

St Christopher's Chapel may refer to:

- St Christopher's Chapel, Queensland, Australia
- St Christopher's Chapel, Great Ormond Street Hospital, London, UK

== See also ==
- St. Christopher's Church (disambiguation)
