= Lali Armengol =

Spanish playwright and educator

- Born: María Eulalia Armengol Argemi; 29 June 1945 (age 81); La Ametlla, Spain
- Other name: Lali Armengol
- Occupations: Playwright, Spanish and literature professor, cultural manager, theater director

María Eulalia Armengol Argemi (born 29 June 1945), also known by her pseudonym Lali Armengol, is a Spanish playwright, professor of Spanish and literature, cultural manager and theater director. She has been the founder of Teatro 8 de Marzo and the Casa de la Mujer Juana Ramírez "La Avanzadora" theater groups, and has directed the Maracay University Theater.

== Works ==
- Betty Blue con remolacha
- Con un poco de...
- Las mañanas
- Las marcas del agua
- Miss Gloria
- Ojos sembrados
- Platos
- Puntos suspensivos... etc., etc.
- ¿Quién se comió el cuento?
- Un día como hoy
