= Rafael Ángel Rondón Márquez =

Venezuelan writer and historian

Rafael Ángel Rondón Márquez, better known as R.A. Rondón Márquez (Zea, Venezuela, 1898 - Caracas, 1966), was a Venezuelan writer and historian, author of Guzmán Blanco, el autócrata civilizador (Municipal Prize of Literature, 1945).
