= St. Christopher's Cathedral (Barcelona, Venezuela) =

- Catedral de San Cristóbal
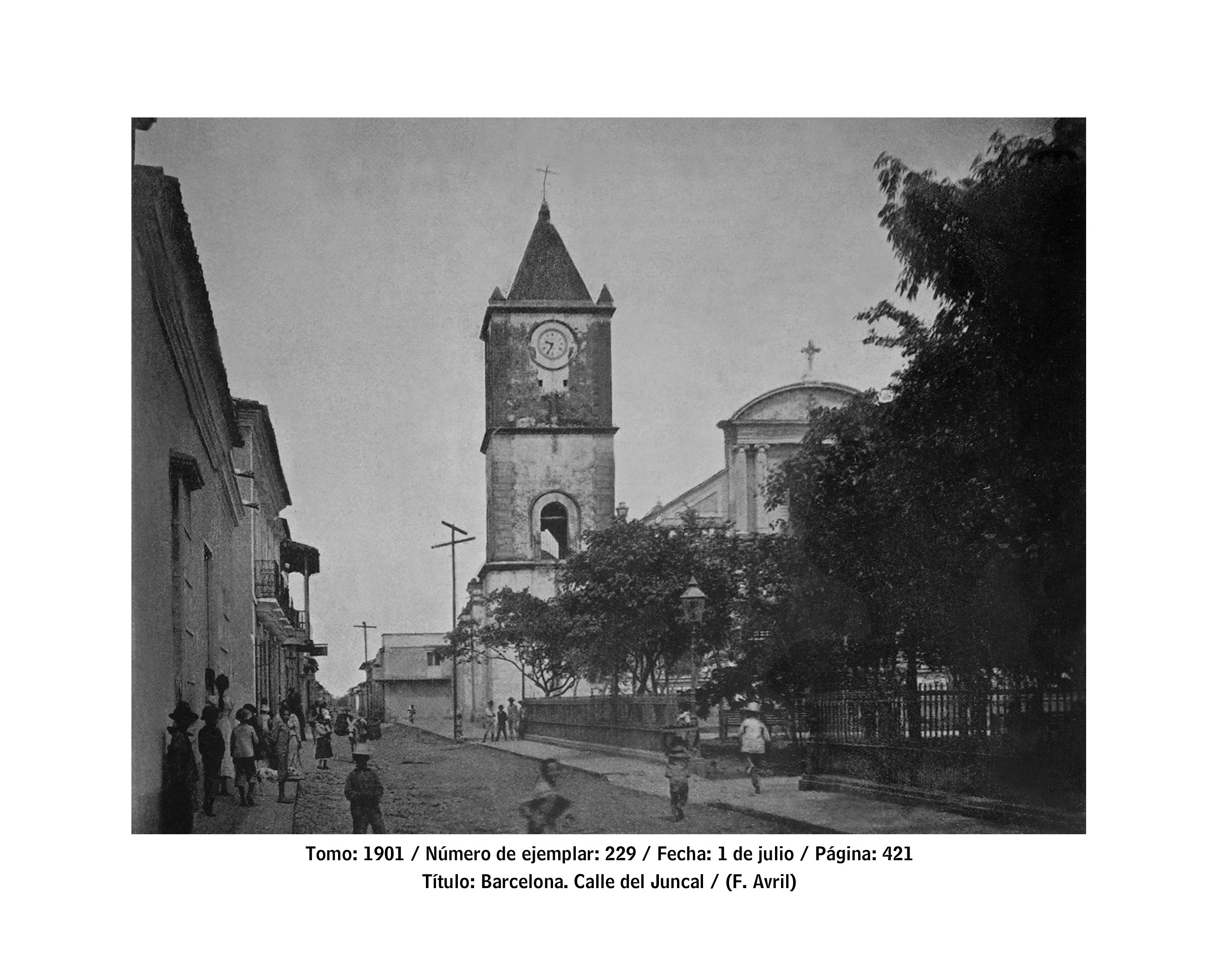
- St. Christopher's Cathedral
- Location: Barcelona
- Country: Venezuela
- Denomination: Catholic Church

St. Christopher's Cathedral (Spanish: Catedral de San Cristóbal de Barcelona) or Barcelona Cathedral is the cathedral of the Roman Catholic Diocese of Barcelona in Venezuela. It is located in the historic center of the city of Barcelona, the capital of Anzoátegui State northwest of Venezuela.

The parish was founded in 1748, but the church was not consecrated until 1773, erected after Spanish settlers had come to the region. It is said that the altar houses relics of at least 7 saints: San Severino, St. Eustatius, Saint Facundo, Saint Pedro Alcantara, Saint Pacific, Saint Anastasius and Saint Pascual Bailon. Later in 1777, the Bishop of Puerto Rico, Manuel Jiménez Pérez, brought to the church from Rome the remains of St. Celestine. His remains were placed in a baroque reliquary and placed in a small chapel on the left wing of the church.

== See also ==
- Catholic Church in Venezuela
- List of cathedrals in Venezuela
- St. Christopher's Cathedral (disambiguation)
