= Manuel Caballero =

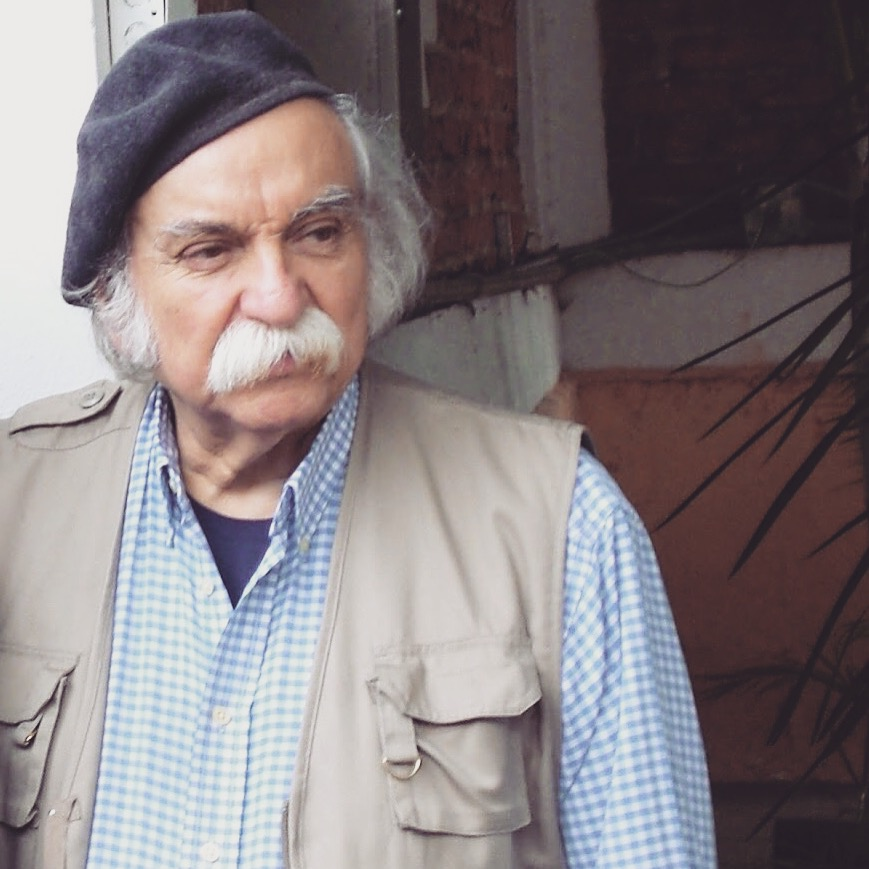
- Manuel Caballero in 2008.
- Born: Manuel Antonio Caballero Agüero; 5 December 1931; Barquisimeto, Lara, Venezuela
- Died: 12 December 2010 (aged 79); Caracas, Venezuela
- Occupations: Historian, writer, journalist
- Spouse: Hanni Ossott
- Writing career
- Genres: History, essay
- Subject: History of Venezuela
- Notable works: Gómez, el tirano liberal (1993)

Signature
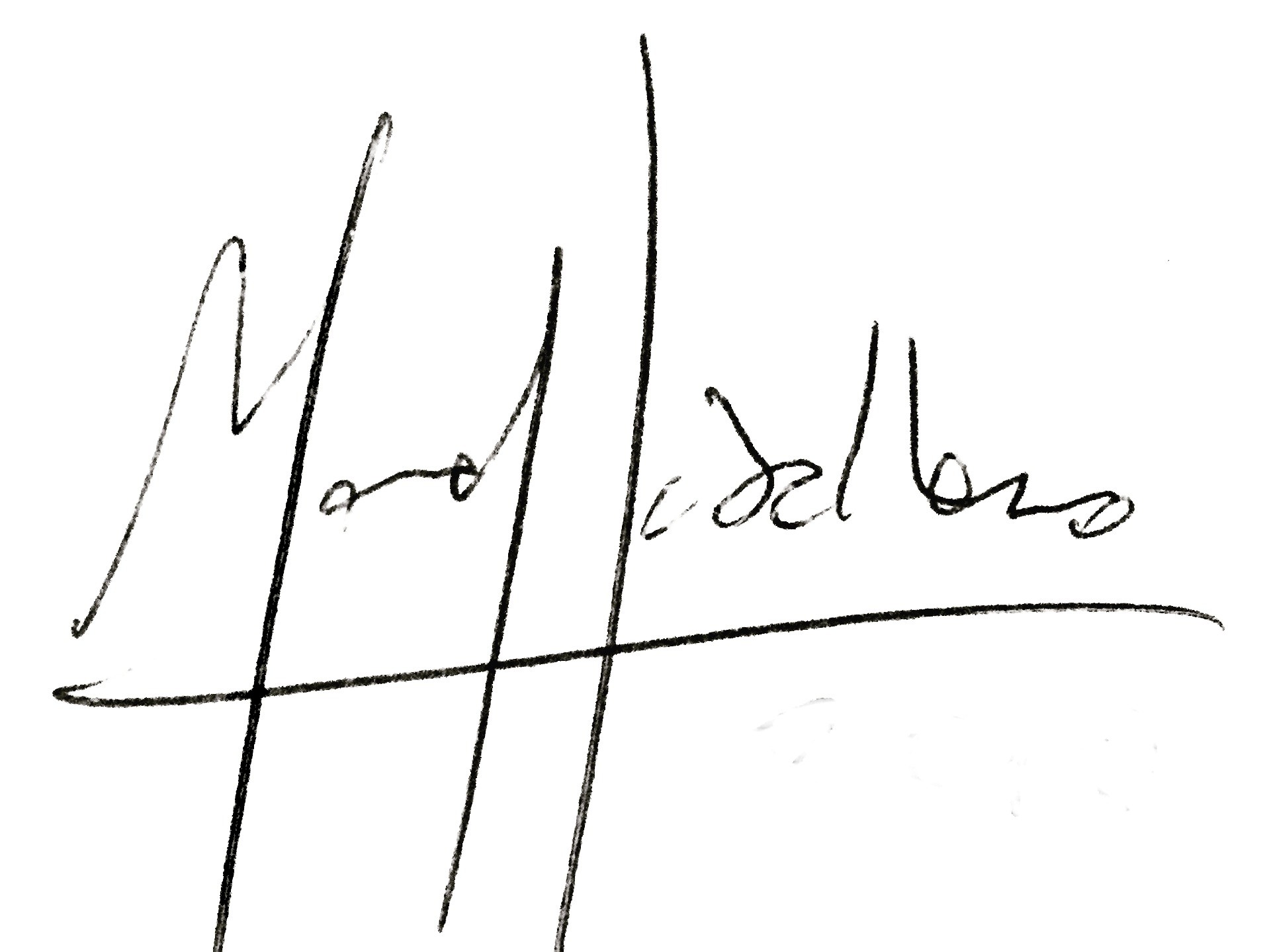

Manuel Antonio Caballero Agüero (5 December 1931 – 12 December 2010) was a notable Venezuelan historian, journalist, best-selling author and professor of contemporary Venezuelan History at the Central University of Venezuela.

== Biography ==
Caballero was born in Barquisimeto, studied history at the Central University of Venezuela and obtained a PhD at University College London. With the publication of his PhD dissertation he became the first Venezuelan author to be published by Cambridge University Press. In 1989 he was invited to teach at Universitá degli Studi di Napoli in Italy. He received the National Award on Journalism (Premio Nacional de Periodismo) and the National History Award (Premio Nacional de Historia, 1994) and in 2005 he was elected as a member of the Academia Nacional de la Historia (or National Academy of History of Venezuela). He wrote regularly for Venezuelan newspapers El Nacional, El Diario de Caracas and most recently El Universal. Despite his past as a left-wing thinker and political activist, in particular against president Rómulo Betancourt, in his latter years he became one of the most vocal and vehement critics of president Hugo Chávez and his administration. He revised his perspective on President Betancourt in a biography written in 2004.

On 2010, he underwent a prostate surgery that triggered a series of infections unresponsive to antibiotics, further complicated by diabetes. He died on 12 December 2010.

== Legacy ==
For Manuel Caballero, democracy was not fundamentally a constitutional arrangement or a mechanism for dividing powers, but a social mentality, a “genre of life.” It becomes genuinely rooted only when citizens cease to fear tyranny and discover their own collective political power: the realization that people acting together in the streets can oblige a government to change course. This conception leads to one of his most paradoxical historical theses: the dictatorships of Cipriano Castro and, above all, Juan Vicente Gómez unintentionally created some of the essential conditions for Venezuelan democracy. By centralizing the state, creating a modern military apparatus, integrating the territory through roads, and finally suppressing the recurring civil wars of the caudillos, they helped construct the modern nation-state that democracy would later complete. Hence Caballero reversed the conventional European sequence in which the nation creates the state: in Venezuela, he argued, the State created the Nation, providing the administrative and territorial integration upon which modern citizenship could subsequently develop.

For the same reason, Caballero placed the decisive birth of Venezuelan democracy not at Gómez’s death in 1935 but on February 14, 1936. The death of the dictator ended a regime; it did not by itself create democratic politics. On February 14, massive peaceful demonstrations forced the government to replace its repressive cabinet and adopt a programme of democratization. For Caballero, this was the first decisive moment when the emerging citizenry defeated absolutism through collective, nonviolent political action. It exemplified his broader conception of democracy as the passage from dependence and fear to active citizenship. He regarded the Generation of 1928 as especially important in this transformation because it “invented politics” in Venezuela: politics meant recognizing the adversary, tolerating disagreement and refusing violence as the normal means of resolving differences. The country thus began to move from “power by fire” toward “power by number” and by the word.

This interpretation was inseparable from Caballero’s profound antimilitarism. His hostility to what he called “the military plague” was one of the most consistent principles of his historical and political thought. He maintained that even the worst civilian government was preferable to the best military government, because military rule represented, in his view, a kind of war waged by the state against its own citizens. His defense of the representative democratic period from 1958 to 1998 therefore had a strong historical dimension. He regarded those four decades not as an imperfect interlude to be dismissed because of their deficiencies, but as a “peaceful revolution” during which more Venezuelans enjoyed a better standard of living than at any previous time. Among its achievements he particularly emphasized the unprecedented expansion of education, including the massification of university education, and the broader social and cultural modernization produced by representative institutions.

Caballero’s understanding of history was explicitly contemporary. Following the intellectual tradition associated with Benedetto Croce and Marc Bloch, he held that all history is contemporary because historians necessarily approach the past through the questions and anxieties of their own present. His famous observation that Venezuelan history “got off its horse” in 1903 expressed this methodological and political shift: with the definitive end of the great caudillo wars, history should cease to be primarily the story of military heroes and become increasingly the history of civilian political action, institutions, conflicts and citizenship. History was therefore not antiquarian knowledge but a form of collective memory and a permanent warning against repeating past mistakes. The deliberate falsification of history by totalitarian regimes was especially dangerous because it deprived people of that memory and reduced them, in Caballero’s formulation, to a condition of “mental childhood”: a population unable to recognize the consequences of political choices because its past has been systematically reconstructed.

This explains his hostility to messianism and personalism, particularly to the cult surrounding Simón Bolívar when it was transformed from historical memory into a political instrument. Caballero regarded the “Bolivarian” cult as an antihistorical attempt to justify the power of a contemporary leader through a “substitute religion” of the state. No nation, in his view, could legitimately reduce its history to the actions of one supposedly providential man. Personalism was therefore not merely an unfortunate political style but a fundamentally reactionary conception of history, because it replaced collective political agency with dependence on the leader.

His conception of decentralization represented the corresponding opposite movement. The federalist and decentralizing reforms of the late twentieth century could be interpreted as the gradual liquidation of the centralized Gomecista state: functions once monopolized by the central government were progressively returned to society and local institutions. For Caballero, this was evidence of political maturation. The historical trajectory of Venezuela could thus be understood as a long movement from caudillismo and military domination, through the construction of a centralized nation-state, toward a society capable of exercising political power through citizenship rather than violence.

Taken together, these ideas form a distinctive interpretation of Venezuelan modernity. The state first had to be strong enough to suppress the centrifugal violence of the caudillos and create national integration; society then had to become strong enough to limit and democratize that state. Democracy was consequently neither the simple opposite of dictatorship nor a gift bestowed by enlightened rulers. It emerged through a historical transformation in which state-building, civic mobilization, political tolerance, decentralization and collective memory gradually replaced military force, personalism and fear. Caballero’s deepest concern was therefore not simply who governed Venezuela, but whether Venezuelans had become capable of governing themselves – and of defending that capacity against the recurring temptation to surrender political responsibility to a single leader.

== Works ==
- La Pasión de Comprender: ensayos de historia (y de) política (1983)
- El Orgullo de Leer (1988)
- Las Elecciones Presidenciales: ¿la última oportunidad o la primera? (1989)
- Gómez, El Tirano Liberal: vida y muerte del siglo XIX (1993)
- De la "Pequeña Venecia" a la "Gran Venezuela": una historia de cinco siglos (1997)
- Contra el golpe, la dictadura militar y la guerra civil (1998)
- La Crisis de la Venezuela Contemporánea 1903–1992 (1998)
- La gestación de Hugo Chávez: 40 años de luces y sombras en la democracia venezolana (2000)
- Latin America and the Comintern, 1919–1943 (2002)
- Rómulo Betancourt, Político de Nación (2004)
- El Desorden de los Refugiados (2004)
- Dramatis Personae: doce ensayos biográficos (2004)
- ¿Por qué no soy bolivariano? (2006)
- La Peste Militar (2007)
- Contra la abolición de la historia (2008)
- Polémicas y otras formas de escritura (2008)
- No más de una cuartilla (2009)
- Historia de los venezolanos en el siglo XX (2010)
