= José Contreras (footballer, born 1994) =

Venezuelan footballer (born 1994)

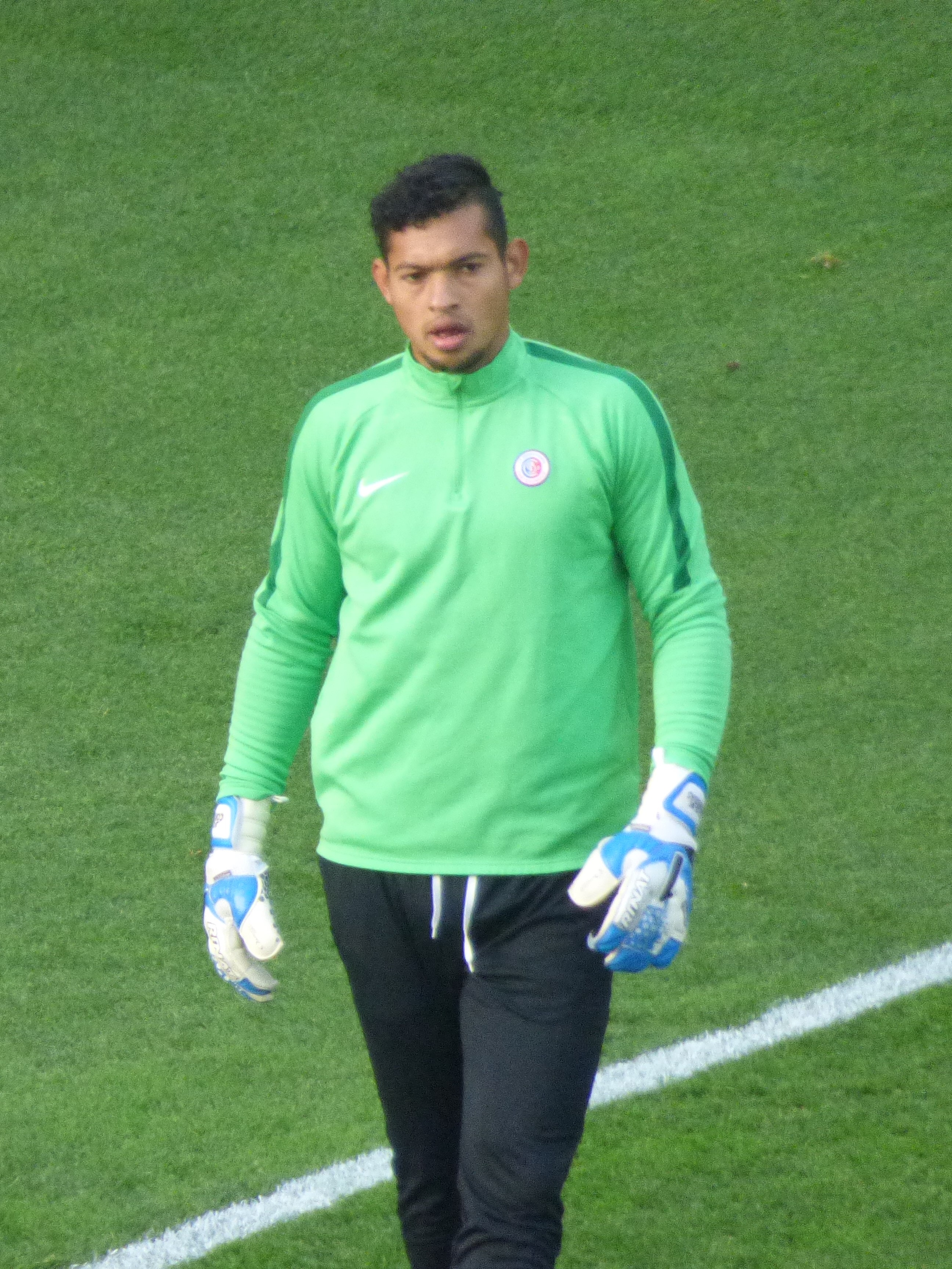
- Contreras with LB Châteauroux in 2018

Personal information
- Full name: José David Contreras Verna
- Date of birth: 20 October 1994 (age 32)
- Place of birth: Guasdualito, Venezuela
- Height: 1.89 m (6 ft 2 in)
- Position: Goalkeeper

Team information
- Current team: Barcelona S.C.
- Number: 1

Youth career
- Aragua

Senior career*
Years	Team	Apps	(Gls)
2011–2013	Aragua	43	(0)
2013–2020	Deportivo Táchira	159	(0)
2018–2019	→ Châteauroux (loan)	7	(0)
2021	Deportivo Pasto	10	(0)
2021-2022	San Carlos	16	(0)
2022–2024	Águilas Doradas	98	(0)
2025–	Barcelona SC	44	(0)

International career^{‡}
2011	Venezuela U17	4	(0)
2013	Venezuela U20	4	(0)
2016–	Venezuela	14	(0)
Medal record
Men's football
Representing Venezuela
FIFA Series
Runner-up	2026 Uzbekistan
- * Club domestic league appearances and goals as of 13 September 2026 ‡ National team caps and goals as of 22:00, 2 October 2025 (UTC)

José David Contreras Verna (born 20 October 1994), is a Venezuelan professional footballer who plays as a goalkeeper for Barcelona SC and the Venezuela national team. He was part of the Venezuela squad for the 2016 Copa América Centenario.

== International career ==
He was first called up to the Venezuela national team for a friendly match against Honduras on August 10, 2011. However, his official debut came against Chile on March 29, 2016, during the 2018 World Cup qualifiers. That same year, he was part of the final 23-man roster selected to compete in the Copa América Centenario.

== Career statistics ==
=== International ===
As of match played 2 October 2026

Appearances and goals by national team and year
National team	Year	Apps	Goals
Venezuela	2016	3	0
Venezuela	2017	3	0
Venezuela	2025	3	0
Venezuela	2026	5	0
Total		14	0

== Honours ==
Deportivo Táchira

- Liga FUTVE: 2014–15

Venezuela

- FIFA Series runner-up: 2026
