= César Espinoza (Venezuelan footballer) =

Venezuelan footballer (born 1974)

Personal information
- Date of birth: 16 September 1974 (age 52)
- Position: Goalkeeper

International career
Years	Team	Apps	(Gls)
1997	Venezuela	1	(0)

César Espinoza (born 16 September 1974) is a Venezuelan former footballer. He played in one match for the Venezuela national football team in 1997. He was also part of Venezuela's squad for the 1997 Copa América tournament.
