= Bolivarian Military Aviation of Venezuela =

Aerial warfare branch of Venezuela's armed forces

- Aviación Militar Bolivariana
- Coat of arms of the Bolivarian Military Aviation
- Founded: 10 December 1920; 105 years ago
- Country: Venezuela
- Type: Air force
- Role: Aerial warfare
- Part of: Bolivarian Armed Forces
- Nickname: AMB
- Patron: Our Lady of Loreto
- Mottos: Latin: Spatium superanus palatinus; "The paladin of the sovereign space"
- Colours: Bleu celeste
- March: Spanish: Himno de la Aviacion Militar Nacional; "Hymn of the National Military Aviation"
- Anniversaries: 10 December (Air Force Day)

Commanders
- Minister of Defence: General Gustavo González López

Insignia
- Flag

- Roundel

- Fin flash

Aircraft flown
- Electronic warfare: Dassault Falcon 20C Prometeo, Fairchild C-26B Metro EW
- Fighter: Su-30MK2, F-16
- Trainer: SF-260, EMB-312, K-8
- Transport: C-130, Y-8, Boeing 707-320C, Short 360

Bolivarian Military Aviation of Venezuela (Spanish: Aviación Militar Bolivariana), is a professional armed body designed to defend Venezuela's sovereignty and airspace. It is a service component of the National Bolivarian Armed Forces of Venezuela.

== Etymology ==
The organization is also known as the Bolivarian National Air Force of Venezuela. Its current official name has been in use since the end of 2008. It was previously called the Venezuelan Air Force (FAV; Spanish: Fuerza Aérea Venezolana).

== History ==
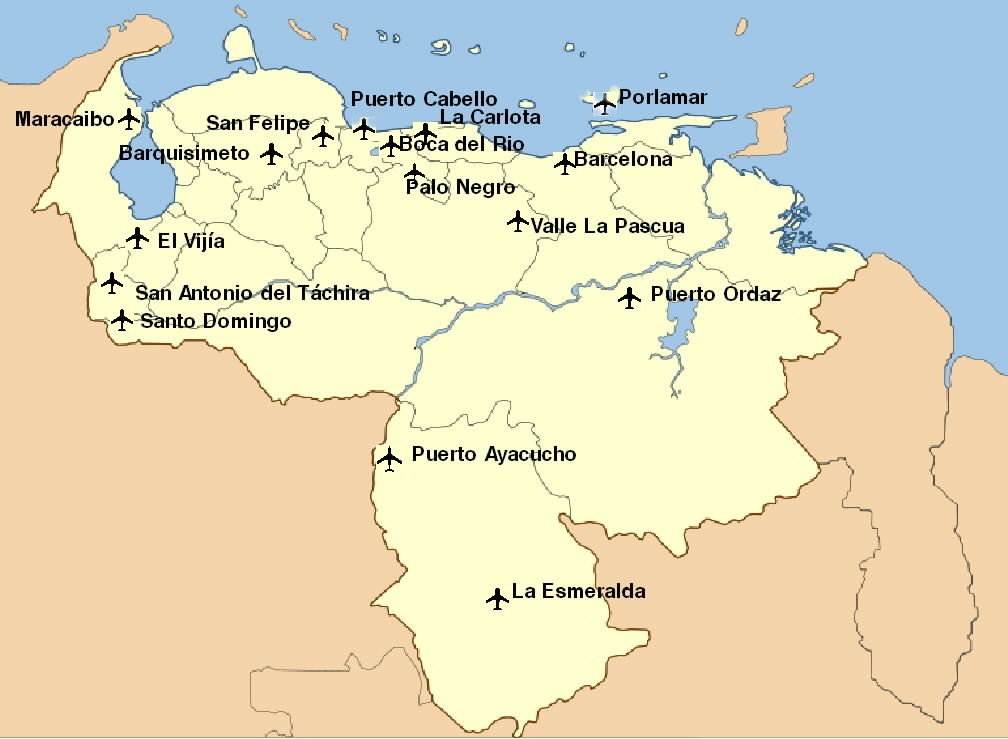
The location of FAV airbases

Most of the airbases in Venezuela were built in the 1960s as part of a massive expansion program. The main fighter types in those years were the Canberra B(I).88, Venom FB.54, Vampire FB.52, F-86K Sabre Dog and the F-86F Sabre. Bomber squadrons typically operated B-25J Mitchell aircraft. The 1970s and 1980s saw a considerable increase in capacity, with rising oil prices enabling the FAV to re-equip most of its units. The Mirage IIIEV and Mirage 5V, Mirage 50EV, VF-5A and D, T-2D, OV-10A and E, and T-27 were introduced. Venezuela was one of the first export customers for the F-16A/B Fighting Falcon and was the first in Latin America to receive the aircraft, which arrived in 1983 for the newly formed Grupo Aéreo de Caza 16 at El Libertador Airbase.

In both February and November Venezuelan coup attempts of 1992, elements of the Venezuelan Air Force were key participants in the rebellion. FAV units at El Libertador Air Base under the command of Brigadier General Visconti seized control of the airbase and then launched an attack on the capital. OV-10s, T-27s, and Mirage III fighters under Visconti's command bombarded targets in the capital and loyalist air bases, destroying five VF-5 fighters on the ground.

Two loyalist pilots escaped with F-16 fighters and shot down two OV-10s and a Tucano, claiming air superiority for the government. Two more rebel OV-10s were lost to ground fire. As the tables turned on the coup attempt, General Visconti and his allies fled in two C-130s, two Mirages, an OV-10, and several SA 330 helicopters.

== Modernization ==
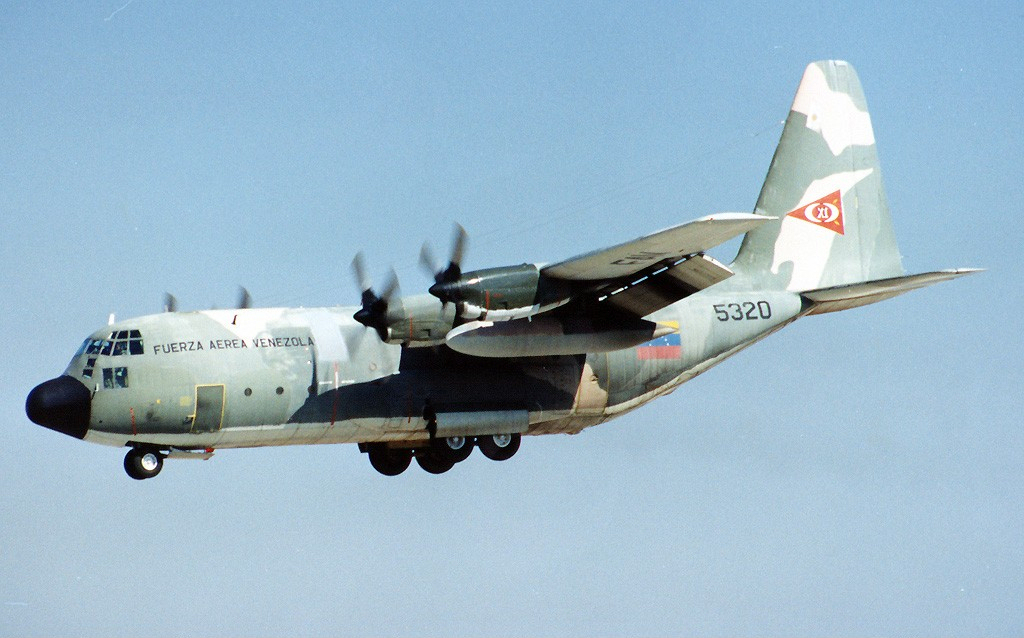
A C-130H Hercules on approach

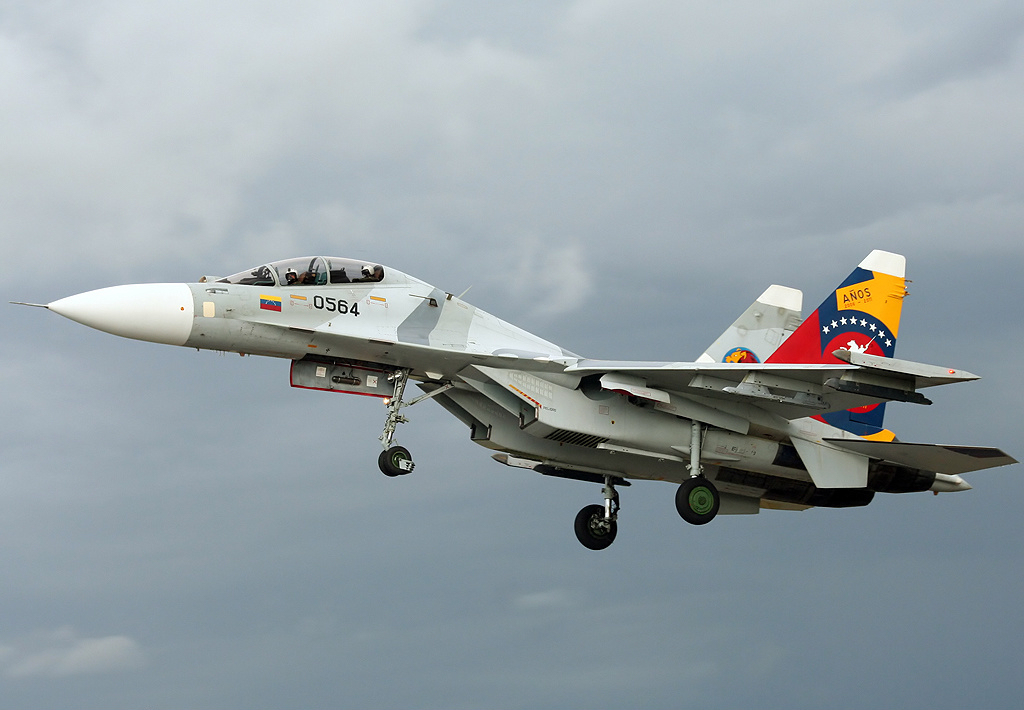
A Sukhoi Su-30MK2 liftoff

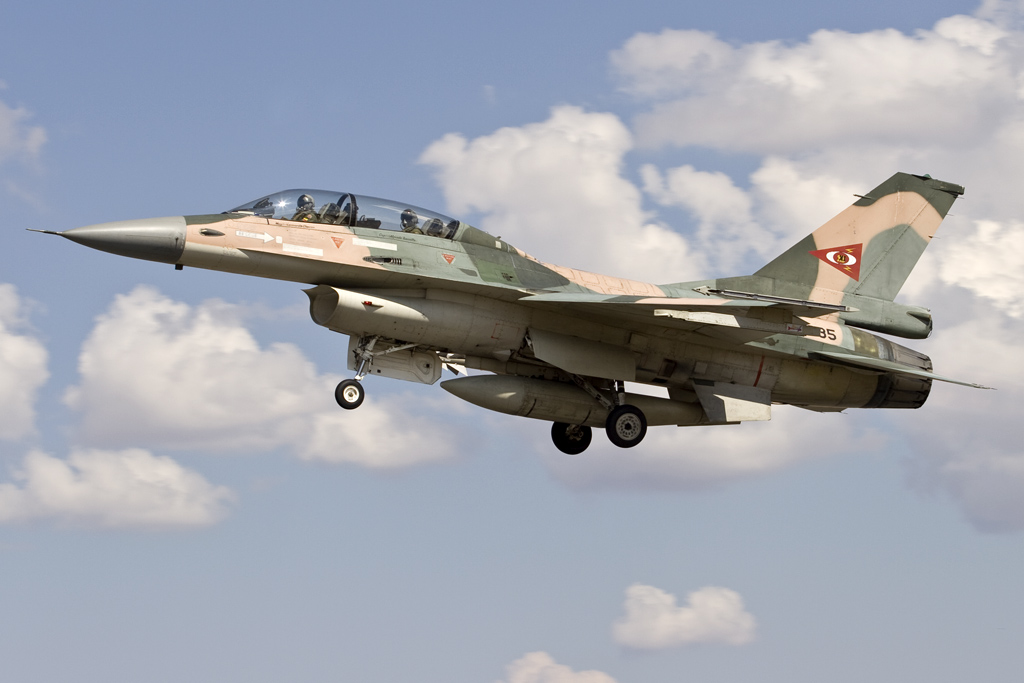
A Venezuelan Air Force F-16B

In July 2006, the AMV purchased 24 Sukhoi Su-30MK2 planes from Russia, as a result of the United States embargo on spare parts for their F-16 fighters and to replace the Mirage 50EV. In 2008, Venezuela sought a potential acquisition of a number of Su-35SE fighter aircraft and a second batch of 12–24 Sukhoi Su-30 from Russia. The acquisition did not succeed.

In 2010, the Venezuelan Air Force retired their aging VF-5A/D and T-2D fleet. Hongdu K-8W took their place, after being received earlier in 2010.

In October 2015, Venezuela announced a plan to purchase 12 more Su-30MK2 from Russia for $480 million.

== Structure ==
Air bases:

- Captain Manuel Ríos Aerospace Base (Base Aero-Espacial Capitán Manuel Ríos)
- El Libertador Air Base (Base Aérea El Libertador)
- General-in-Chief José Antonio Páez Air Base (Base Aérea General en Jefe José Antonio Páez)
- General-in-Chief Rafael Urdaneta Air Base (Base Aérea General en Jefe Rafael Urdaneta)
- Generalissimo Francisco de Miranda Air Base (Base Aérea Generalísimo Francisco de Miranda)
- Lieutenant Colonel Teófilo Luis Méndez Air Base (Base Aérea Teniente Coronel Teófilo Luis Méndez)
- Lieutenant Luis del Valle Garcia Air Base (Base Aérea Teniente Luis del Valle García)
- Lieutenant Vicente Landaeta Gil Air Base (Base Aérea Teniente Vicente Landaeta Gil)
- Mariscal Sucre Air Base (Base Aérea Mariscal Sucre)

== Inventory ==
Aircraft	Origin	Type	Variant	In service	Notes
Combat aircraft
F-16 Fighting Falcon	United States	multirole	F-16A/B Block 15	3	24 were originally purchased in 1982; only a small quantity may remain in service or potentially none at all, due to a lack of spare parts.
Sukhoi Su-30	Russia	multirole	Su-30MK2	14	24 were originally purchased, some were lost in accidents.
Electronic warfare
Fairchild Metroliner	United States	EW		1	
Tanker
Boeing 707	United States	Tanker	KC-707	1	Converted to support Aerial refueling
Transport
Cessna 208	United States	Utility		2	1 crashed in 2025
Dornier 228	Germany	Utility	Do 228NG	3	
Beechcraft Super King Air	United States	Utility	200/350	5	
Fairchild Metroliner	United States	Utility		1	
Lockheed C-130	United States	Transport	C-130H	3	
Shaanxi Y-8	China	Transport		8	
Short 360	United Kingdom	Utility		2	
Helicopters
Enstrom 280	United States	trainer		2	
Enstrom 480	United States	trainer		11	4 on order. 1 crashed in 2025.
Eurocopter AS532	France	transport		10	
Mil Mi-17	Russia	utility		6	
Trainer
Diamond DA42	Austria	multi-engine trainer		6	
Embraer EMB 312	Brazil	trainer		17	
General Dynamics F-16	United States	conversion trainer	F-16B	1	
Hongdu JL-8	China	jet trainer	K-8W	23	
SIAI-Marchetti SF.260	Italy	basic trainer		11	
UAV
Ghods Mohajer	Iran	UCAV	SANT Arpía	12	

== Ranks ==
=== Commissioned officer ranks ===
The rank insignia of commissioned officers.

Rank group	General / flag officers				Senior officers			Junior officers
Venezuelan Air Force
Venezuelan Air Force	General en jefe	Mayor general	General de division	General de brigada	Coronel	Teniente coronel	Mayor	Capitán	Primer teniente	Teniente

=== Other ranks ===
The rank insignia of Venezuelan non-commissioned officers and enlisted personnel.

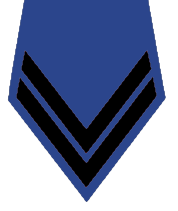
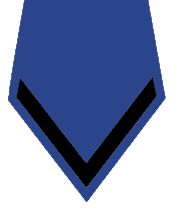
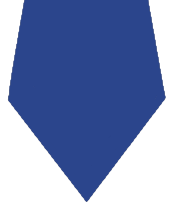
Rank group	Senior NCOs							Junior NCOs		Enlisted
Venezuelan Air Force											No insignia
Venezuelan Air Force	Sargento supervisor	Sargento ayudante	Sargento mayor de primera	Sargento mayor de segunda	Sargento mayor de tercera	Sargento primero	Sargento segundo	Cabo primero	Cabo segundo	Distinguido	Aviador

== Accidents ==
- On 3 September 1976, a Lockheed C-130H owned and operated by the Venezuelan Air Force crashed near Lajes Airbase, Azores, Portugal, killing all 68 occupants on board.

== Bibliography ==
- Hagedorn, Dan. "Latin Mitchells: North American B-25s in South America, Part Three". Air Enthusiast No. 107, September/October 2003. pp. 36–41. ISSN 0143-5450
