= Adolfo Aristeguieta Gramcko =

Venezuelan writer, diplomat, and medical doctor

Adolfo Aristeguieta
- Born: Adolfo Mauricio Aristeguieta Gramcko; 23 January 1929; Caracas
- Died: 31 July 1998 (aged 69); Caracas
- Education: Colegio La Salle; Universidad Central de Venezuela
- Occupations: Writer, medical doctor, Scout leader and ambassador to Germany

Adolfo Mauricio Aristeguieta Gramcko (23 January 1929, in Caracas – 31 July 1998) was a Venezuelan writer, medical doctor, Scout leader and ambassador to Germany. He joined the Venezuelan Society for the History of Medicine.

== Studies ==
Aristeguieta attended primary school in Puerto Cabello, Carabobo, about 260 km west of the Venezuelan capital. He continued through secondary education at the Colegio La Salle in Caracas, and graduated with a bachelor's degree in Biological Sciences. He then studied medicine at the Universidad Central de Venezuela, Escuela Luis Razetti and earned the title of Surgeon, and subsequently a Doctorate in Medicine with a thesis on tropical medicine. He studied psychiatry in Chile and Switzerland, and became a specialist in this area.

== Professional work ==
Aristeguieta was linked to the Venezuelan Council of Children (Programa de Jóvenes), where he worked for the boys who had to stay home for observation ("juvenile detention"). He designed and directed the "Camping as a Scout" programme, an activity conducted by Scouts for participants who are boys with very low income, or from marginal areas, or (so-called) "from the streets".

He was a diplomat of Venezuela. President Luis Herrera Campins appointed him Venezuela's ambassador to Germany. Besides Spanish, he mastered other languages, such as English, French, and German. He collaborated with publications in The Homeopathic Gaceta de Caracas and joined the Board of Directors of the Venezuelan Congress of Homeopathic Medicine.

== Role in Scouting ==
=== Scout Association of Venezuela ===
After the first Conference of Scouting in 1946, Venezuela became further engaged with World Scouting and the training scheme aimed at Gilwell Park. For several years, Venezuelan leaders took their courses abroad, usually Wood Badge courses, including Adolfo Aristeguieta Gramcko, who extended his Wood Badge in Catalina de Güines, Cuba. In 1951, he created the National Training Scout Bureau, led by Franz L. Huigen, attached to the National Scout Office. In December 1955 the staff participated in the course of the first Wood Badge issued in Venezuela at the ranch "La Guadeloupe, in Ocumare del Tuy, Miranda State. In March 1956 he worked at the Wood Badge Course for Commissioners. In 1957, he served as Head of Field for the first Wood Badge course for leaders of Cub Scouts Branch at Hacienda el Encantado.

=== Vision for Latin America and the world ===
He designed and managed, in many Latin American countries, the "New Directions" seminar, which exhorted Scout leaders to reflect on the origins of Scouting, its principles, methods, programs, and the need to reach more individuals.

He worked at the World Scout Bureau, which commissioned the review of the training program. He chaired the Inter-American Council of Scouting and worked with the Food and Agriculture Organization and Organization of American States.

In 1976, the World Organization of the Scout Movement decorated him with the Bronze Wolf, the highest recognition of the youth movement, for his work in the World Scout Committee and Regional.

In recognition of his important role in training several generations, the Scout Association of Venezuela established the Order Adolfo Aristeguieta Gramcko to recognize scout leaders with proven dedication to the design, implementation and assessment of Scouting programs. This order highlights the importance of work in curriculum design and its constant revision to ensure they remain current and therefore the quality of training events. It is given to reward constant effort in this area for a period not less than eight (8) years, although other roles in the institution are eligible.

The World Baden-Powell Fellowship named him an Honorary Member in memoriam.

== Bibliography ==
- Hadas, duendes y brujas del puerto, Ediciones de la Gobernación del Estado Carabobo, ISBN 980-6259-04-1.
- Los "Juegos psicológicos" como factor interferente en la expansión del Escultismo
- Reflexiones ante la evolución del pensamiento medico
- Contribución para la interpretación del fenómeno hippie
