= Vinicio Adames =

Venezuelan musician

José Vinicio Adames Piñero

Background information
- Born: José Vinicio Adames Piñero; March 1, 1927
- Died: September 3, 1976 (aged 49) Azores Islands, Portugal
- Genres: Classical
- Occupations: Singer, director and composer

José Vinicio Adames Piñero (March 1, 1927 – September 3, 1976) was a Venezuelan musician, and director of choral groups. He performed as a member of popular group Adames Trio with his sisters Yolanda and Shirley. He led a number of choral groups, including the UCV University Choir, the Chamber Orchestra of the Central University of Venezuela, the Chamber Orchestra of the University of Carabobo, the Panama Symphony Orchestra, the Metropolitan Chamber Orchestra of Caracas, the Shell Choir, the Choral of the Social Security, the Metropolitan Choral Group and the Central Bank of Venezuela Choral. He also wrote original choral pieces and arranged folk music. After his 1976 death in an airplane accident in the Azores Islands, he was honored in Caracas with a park in his name.

== See also ==
- Venezuelan music
- Central University of Venezuela
- 1976 Venezuelan Air Force C-130 crash
