= St. Christopher's Cathedral =

St. Christopher's Cathedral may refer to:

- St. Christopher's Cathedral, Roermond, the Netherlands
- St Christopher's Cathedral, Canberra, Australia
- St. Christopher's Cathedral (Barcelona, Venezuela)
- Belfort Cathedral, France
