= Hanni Ossott =

Venezuelan writer and translator

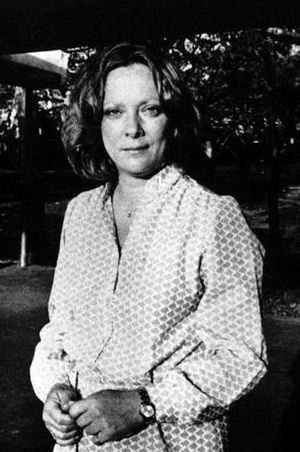
- Born: Hanni Ossott; 14 February 1946; Caracas, Federal District, Venezuela
- Died: 31 December 2002 (aged 56); Caracas, Venezuela
- Education: Universidad Central de Venezuela
- Occupation: poet
- Spouse: Manuel Caballero

Hanni Ossott (14 February 1946 – 31 December 2002) was a Venezuelan poet, translator and art critic.

== Life ==
She was born in Caracas and she received her bachelor's degree in the Universidad Central de Venezuela, where she was also a professor. She was awarded the José Antonio Ramos Sucre Prize and the Lazo Martí Prize and she worked as a translator and a critic. She translated some of the works of Rainer Maria Rilke and Emily Dickinson into Spanish. Her poetry explored themes of existence, sickness, identity, the soul, and the abstract. She was respected as one of the great Venezuelan poets of her time, but remains virtually unknown outside of Venezuela.

== Main works ==
- Hasta que llegue el día y huyan las sombras (1983)
- El reino donde la noche se abre(1986)
- Plegarias y penumbras (1986)
- Cielo, tu arco grande (1989)
- Casa de agua y de sombras (1992)
- El circo roto (1993).
- Como leer la poesía (2005).
