= El Libertador Air Base =

Military airport in Maracay, Venezuela

El Libertador Air Base
- Base Aérea El Libertador
- Maracay, Aragua in Venezuela

Site information
- Type: Military Air base
- Owner: National Bolivarian Armed Forces of Venezuela
- Operator: Bolivarian Military Aviation of Venezuela

Location
- Shown within Venezuela El Libertador (South America)
- Coordinates: 10°10′50″N 067°33′40″W

Site history
- Built: 1992
- In use: 1992 - present

Airfield information
- Identifiers: ICAO: SVBL
- Elevation: 442 metres (1,450 ft) AMSL
Runways
| Direction | Length and surface |
|---|---|
| 09/27 | 3,170 metres (10,400 ft) Concrete |

El Libertador Air Base (Spanish: Base Aérea El Libertador (BAEL); ICAO: SVBL) is a military airport and base for the Bolivarian Military Aviation of Venezuela. It is located in Maracay, a city in central Venezuela and the capital of the state of Aragua.

== History ==
On January 3, 2026 it was the target of airstrikes by the United States.

== Facilities ==
The air base resides at an elevation of 1,450 feet (442 m) above mean sea level. It has one runway designated 09/27 with a concrete surface measuring 3,170 by 48 metres (10,400 ft × 157 ft).
