= Daniel Grau =

Venezuelan record artist (1948–2021)

Daniel Grau Sosa (December 28, 1948 - January 5, 2021) was a Venezuelan composer and record artist. He worked with many dance and electronic music figures, including Gerd Janson, Psychemagik, Ray Mang, and Soul Patrol. Maestro Grau was a pioneer in the genre of jazzanova, a mixture of bossanova, disco, and jazz. He was regarded as "the Venezuelan Giorgio Moroder". Maestro Grau died on January 5, 2021, at the age of 72.

== History ==
Daniel Grau recorded 9 LPs between 1974 and 1983. Just for the fun of it, Grau asked some of the musicians who frequented the studio on a regular basis to use the free studio time to record some of his own songs and compositions under the name of La Orquestra De Daniel Grau. The first two albums from 1974 and 1976, released under this moniker displayed Grau's talent for composition, arrangement and multi-instrumentalism (in guitar, bass and keyboards).

== Collaborations ==
He worked with Latin American music legends like Aldemaro Romero and Vytas Brenner. Fellow Venezuelan DJ Andrés Astorga made a project with Grau realized on Germany's record company Sonar Kollektiv named "The Magic Sound of Daniel Grau", which contains some of his better-known hits.

== Albums ==
- Dejando Volar El Pensamiento (1974)
- La Orquesta De Daniel Grau (1976)
- Disco Fantasy (1979)
- El Sonido Mágico De Daniel Grau (1979)
- Kryptonita Líquida (1979)
- El León Bailarín (1980)
- Canción Del Amanecer (1981)
- Porqué No Podemos Hacerlo (1981)
- 440 Torker, Vol. 9 (1983)
