= Elsa Gramcko =

Venezuelan artist, sculptor (1925–1994)

- Born: April 25, 1925; Puerto Cabello, Venezuela
- Died: March 3, 1994 in Caracas, Venezuela; Caracas, Venezuela
- Known for: Painting
- Movement: Abstract Art

Elsa Gramcko (1925–1994) was a Venezuelan artist, known as an abstract sculptor and painter. Her earlier works, which date from 1954, were geometric paintings, while her later works were more tachist in nature. While her earlier works consisted of mostly paintings, she expanded into sculpture and assemblage in the 1960s and 1970s.

== History ==
Elsa Gramcko was born 9 April 1925 in Puerto Cabello, Carabobo, Venezuela to a German father and Venezuelan mother. Ida Gramcko, her sister, was an essayist and poet.

In 1959, José Gómez Sicre curated her first solo show at the Art Museum of the Americas in Washington D.C. She represented Venezuela in the 1959 São Paulo Art Biennial and in the 1964 Venice Biennale. In 1968 she was awarded the National Art Prize at the Official Salon of Venezuelan Art and in 1966 she became the first woman to obtain the first prize at the D'Empaire Salon held in Maracaibo, Zulia State, Venezuela. Her work is held in various private and public collections throughout Latin America and worldwide, including Museum of Modern Art (MOMA) and Spencer Museum of Art at the University of Kansas.

She died in 1994, in Caracas, Venezuela.

In 2023 her work was included in the exhibition Action, Gesture, Paint: Women Artists and Global Abstraction 1940-1970 at the Whitechapel Gallery in London.
