= Ida Gramcko =

Venezuelan writer (1924–1994)

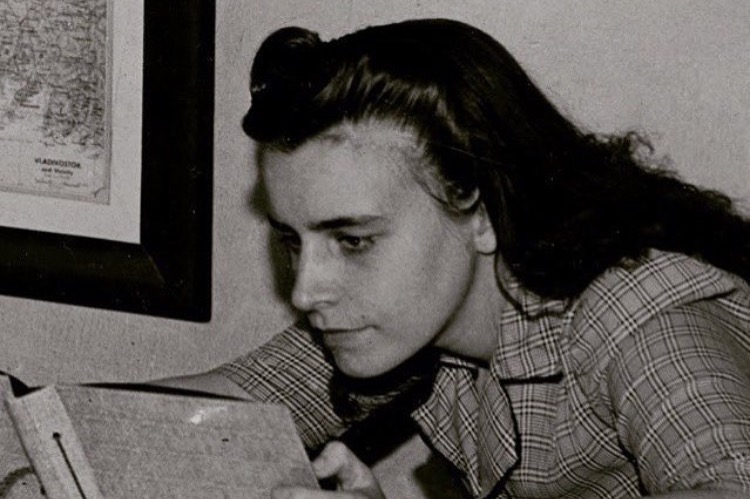
Ida Gramcko

Ida Gramcko (Puerto Cabello, 1924 – Caracas, 1994) was a Venezuelan essayist and poet. She was a recipient of the National Prize for Literature.

== Personal life ==
Gramcko was born in Venezuela to a German father and Venezuelan mother. Her sister, Elsa Gramcko, was an abstract sculptor and painter.

== Publications ==
- Threshold (1941)
- Glass House (1944)
- Against the naked heart of Heaven (1944)
- The Magic Wand (1948)
- Poems (1952)
- Maria Lionza (1955) verse drama
- Poems of a psychotic (1964)
- The most murmurs (1965)
- Sun and loneliness (1966)
- This boulder (1967, prose and poetry)
- Psalms (1968)
- 0 degrees North Franco (1969)
- The aesthetes, the beggars, the heroes: Poems, 1958 (1970)
- Sonnets of Origin (1972)
- The wanderings and find. Anthology (1972)
- Chores, knowledge, companies (1973)
- Salto Angel (1985)
- Selected Works (1988)
- Treno (1993)
