= List of regional anthems =

Anthems of dependent territories, non-sovereign states, and regions

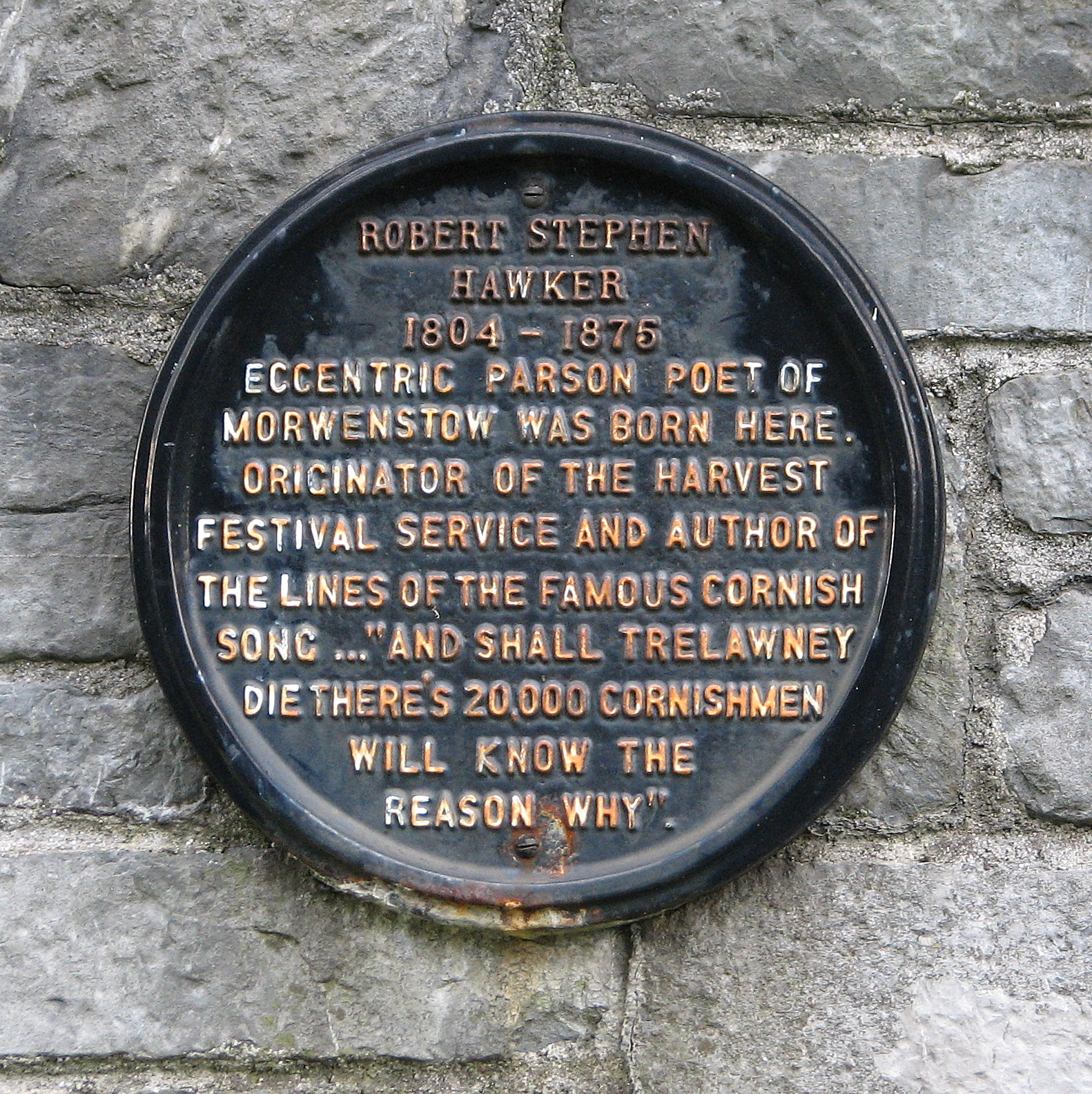
A plaque commemorating Robert Stephen Hawker, author of "The Song of the Western Men".

This is a list of regional anthems, that is those of dependent territories, non-sovereign states, and regions.

== List ==
| Region | National anthem title in local language(s) | Period | Lyrics writer(s) | Anthem composer(s) | Audio | Country |
|---|---|---|---|---|---|---|
| Acadia | "Ave maris stella" ("Hail, Star of the Ocean") | 1884 | Unknown (Latin original) / Jacinthe Laforest (French lyrics) | Unknown | | Canada |
| Aceh | "Aceh Mulia" ("Noble Aceh") | 2018 | Mahrisal Rubi | | | Indonesia |
| Acholi Kingdom | "Lubaro me Acholi" ("Acholi Anthem") | Unknown | | Prof. Okot Pa Bitek | | Uganda |
| Adhola Kingdom | "Were Omaro Padhola" ("God has blessed Padhola") | Unknown | | Toto Awor | | Uganda |
| Adygea | "Anthem of the Republic of Adygea" | 1992 | Iskhak Shumafovich Mashbash | Umar Khatsitsovich Tkhabisimov | Anthem of the Republic of Adygea | Russia |
| Agin-Buryat Okrug | "Altan boooosa — Aguamnay" ("Golden Land — My Aga") | 2013 | Orotov Dam (original) Bair Dugarov (translation) | Rinchin Baldandashiev | | Russia |
| Aguascalientes | "Himno de Aguascalientes" ("Anthem of Aguascalientes") | 1867 | Esteban Ávila Mier | Miguel Meneses | Himno de Aguascalientes | Mexico |
| Agusan del Sur | "Hail, Agusan del Sur" | Unknown | Perigrina Leonardo | Lea A. Guelos | | Philippines |
| Aklan | "Aklan Hymn" | 2010 | Dr. Jesse M. Gomez | | | Philippines |
| Åland Islands | "Ålänningens sång" ("The Ålander's Song") | 1922 | John Grandell | Johan Fridolf Hagfors | Ålänningens sång | Finland |
| Albay | "Albay Forever" | 2004 | Jose R. Ravalo | | | Philippines |
| Alberta | "Alberta" | 2005 | Mary Kieftenbeld | | | Canada |
| Alsace | "Elsässisches Fahnenlied" ("Hymn to the Alsatian Flag") | 1911 | Emil Woerth | | Elsässisches Fahnenlied | France |
| Altai Republic | "Altay Respublikanıñ Gimnı" ("Altai Republic Anthem") | 2001 | V. Peshnyaka | A. Adarova. | Altay Respublikanıñ Gimnı | Russia |
| Alur Kingdom | "Ker Alur" ("Alur kingdom") | Unknown | | Cwinya-ai Atia | | Uganda |
| Amazonas | "Himno del Estado Amazonas" ("Amazonas State Anthem") | 1986 | Hernán Gruber Odremán | | Himno del Estado Amazonas | Venezuela |
| Amazonas Department | "Himno de Amazonas" ("Anthem of Amazonas") | Unknown | | | | Colombia |
| American Samoa | "Amerika Samoa" (American Samoa) | 1950 | Mariota Tiumalu Tuiasosopo | Napoleon Andrew Tuiteleleapaga | Anthem of American Samoa | United States |
| Anambra State | "Anambra State Anthem" | Unknown | | Tony Odili Ujubuonu | | Nigeria |
| Andalusia | "La bandera blanca y verde" ("The white and green flag") | 1981 | Blas Infante | Sevilla José del Castillo Díaz | La bandera blanca y verde | Spain |
| Andhra Pradesh | "Maa Telugu Thalliki" ("To Our Mother Telugu") | 1975 | Sankarambadi Sundaraachari | Suryakumari | | India |
| Anguilla | "God Bless Anguilla" | 1981 | Unknown | | God Bless Anguilla | United Kingdom |
| Antioquia Department | "Himno de Antioquia" ("Anthem of Antioquia") | 1962 | Epifanio Mejía | Gonzalo Vidal | Himno de Antioquia | Colombia |
| Anzoátegui | "Himno del Estado Anzoátegui" ("Anthem of the State of Anzoátegui") | Unknown | Angel Mottola Martucci | Enrique Pérez Valencia | | Venezuela |
| Aosta Valley | "Montagnes Valdôtaines" ("Mountains of Aosta Valley") | 2006 | Alfred Roland | | Montagnes Valdôtaines | Italy |
| Apure | "Himno del Estado Apure" ("Anthem of the State of Apure") | 1913 | César Ramírez Gómez | Amadeo Garbi | | Venezuela |
| Aragua | "Himno del Estado Aragua" ("Aragua State Anthem") | 1906 | Ramón Bastidas | Manuel Betancourt | Himno del Estado Aragua | Venezuela |
| Aragon | "Himno de Aragón" ("Anthem of Aragon") | 1989 | Ildefonso Manuel Gil, Ángel Guinda, Rosendo Tello and Manuel Vilas | Antón García Abril | Himno de Aragón | Spain |
| Arkhangelsk Oblast | "Gimn Arhangeljskoj oblasti" ("Anthem of Arkhangelsk Oblast") | 2007 | Nina Meshko | | | Russia |
| Aruba | "Aruba Dushi Tera" ("Aruba Precious Country") | 1976 | Juan Chabaya Lampe | Rufo Wever | Aruba Dushi Tera | Netherlands |
| Assam | "O Mur Apunar Desh" ("O My Endearing Country!") | 2013 | Lakshminath Bezbaroa | Kamala Prasad Agarwala | | India |
| Assyria | "Roomrama" ("Honour") | Unknown | Yosip Bet Yosip | Nebu Juel Issabey | | Iraq; Syria; Turkey |
| Asturias | "Asturias, patria querida" ("Asturias, my dear Motherland") | 1984 | Ignacio Piñeiro | Unknown | Asturias, patria querida | Spain |
| Atlántico Department | "Himno del Atlántico" ("Anthem of Atlántico") | 2002 | María Delina Álvarez | Anita Zabaraín Bermúdez | | Colombia |
| Azad Kashmir | "Watan Hamara Azad Kashmir" ("Our State is Free Kashmir") | 1965 | Hafeez Jalandhari | | | Pakistan (disputed) |
| Azores | "Hino dos Açores" ("Hymn of the Azores") | 1980 | Natália Correia | Teófilo Brazão | | Portugal |
| Baden-Württemberg | "Badnerlied" ("Song of the Badenians") unofficial | Unknown | | Joseph Victor von Scheffel | | Germany |
| Baden-Württemberg | "Lied der Württemberger" ("Song of the Württembergians") unofficial | Unknown | Justinus Kerner | Unknown | | Germany |
| Baja California | "Canto a Baja California" ("Song to Baja California") | 1956 | Rafael Trujillo | | | Mexico |
| Baja California Sur | "Orgullo Sudcaliforniano" ("Orgullo Sudcaliforniano") | 2018 | Valentín Castro Burgoin | Alfredo Clayton | | Mexico |
| Balearic Islands | La Balanguera ("The Balanguera") | 1996 | Joan Alcover i Maspons | Amadeu Vives | La Balanguera | Spain |
| Balochistan | "Ma Chuken Balochani" ("We are the sons of the Baloch") | Unknown | Chiragh Baloch | | | Pakistan (disputed) |
| Bangsamoro | "Bangsamoro Hymn" | 2020 | Unknown | | Bangsamoro Hymn | Philippines |
| Baruta Municipality | "Himno del Municipio Baruta" ("Anthem of the Baruta Municipality") | 1994 | Ernesto Luis Rodríguez | Inocente Carreño | | Venezuela |
| Barbuda | "I Believe" | Unknown | | | | Antigua and Barbuda |
| Barinas | "Himno del Estado Barinas" ("Anthem of the State of Barinas") | 1911 | Pedro Elías Gutiérrez | Rafael Montenegro | | Venezuela |
| Bashkortostan | "Başqortostan Respublikahınıñ Däwlät gimn" ("State Anthem of the Republic of Bashkortostan") | 2008 | Ravil Bikbaev, Räşit Şäkür, Farit Idrisov, and Svetlana Çurayeva | Farit Idrisov | National Anthem of the Republic of Bashkortostan | Russia |
| Basque Country | Eusko Abendaren Ereserkia ("Anthem of the Basque Ethnicity") | 1983 | Sabino Arana | Unknown | Anthem of Basque Country | Spain |
| Batanes | "Beautiful Batanes Isles" | 2024 | Pedro D. Indunan | | | Philippines |
| Batangas | "Himno ng Batangan" ("Batangas Hymn") | Unknown | | Cecilia Tusing | | Philippines |
| Bavaria | "Bayernhymne" ("Hymn of Bavaria") | 1964 | Michael Öchsner | Konrad Max Kunz | Bayernhymne | Germany |
| Beni Department | "Himno al Beni" ("Hymn to Beni") | Unknown | Alfredo Pereyra Lanza | Rafael Saghers | Himno al Beni | Bolivia |
| Benguet | "Benguet Hymn" | Unknown | Eleuterio De Jesus | Jayson Manuel L. Osong | | Philippines |
| Bermuda | "Hail to Bermuda" | 1984 | Bette Johns | Bette Johns | Hail to Bermuda | United Kingdom |
| Bern | "Berner Marsch" ("Bernese March") | 1798 | Unknown | Samuel Joneli von Boltigen | Berner Marsch | Switzerland |
| Bihar | "Mere Bharat Ke Kanthahar" ("The Garland of My India") | 2012 | Satya Narayan | Hari Prasad Chaurasia and Shivkumar Sharma | | India |
| Bikini Atoll | "Ij Jab Ber Emol" ("No longer can I stay") | 1946 | Lore Kessibuki | | | Marshall Islands |
| Bogotá | "Himno de Bogotá" ("Anthem of Bogotá") | 1974 | Pedro Medina Avendaño | Roberto Pineda Duque | | Colombia |
| Bogor | "Bogor Kota Kesayangan" ("Bogor Beloved City") | Unknown | Nursyamsi AS | | | Indonesia |
| Bohol | "Awit sa Bohol" ("Song to Bohol") | 1970 | Justino Romea | | Awit sa Bohol | Philippines |
| Bolívar | "Himno del Estado Bolívar" ("Bolívar State Anthem") | 1910 | José Manuel Agosto Méndez | Manuel Lara Colmenares | | Venezuela |
| Bolívar Department | "Himno de Bolívar" ("Anthem of Bolívar") | 1994 | Donaldo Bossa Herazo | Luis Eduardo González Afanador | | Colombia |
| Bonaire | "Tera di Solo y suave biento" ("Country of Sun and Gentle Breeze") | 1964 | Hubert (Lio) Booi | J. B. A. Palm | | Netherlands |
| Bougainville | "My Bougainville" | 2018 | Unknown | Carl Linger | My Bougainville | Papua New Guinea |
| Bremen | "Der Bremer Schlüssel" ("The Bremen Key") | Unknown | Hermann Freese | Georg Kunoth | Der Bremer Schlüssel | Germany |
| Brittany | "Bro Gozh ma Zadoù" | 1897 | François Jaffrennou | James James | Bro Gozh ma Zadoù | France |
| Bryansk Oblast | The Bryansk Forest Sternly Stirred | Unknown | | | | Russia |
| Buganda | "Ekitiibwa kya Buganda" ("The Pride of Buganda") | 1939 | Unknown | Polycarp Kakooza | | Uganda |
| Bugwere Kingdom | "Bugwere Anthem" | Unknown | | | | Uganda |
| Bukidnon | "Bukidnon, My Home" | 2014 | Filomeno M. Bautista | Filomeno M. Bautista | | Philippines |
| Bulacan | "Himno ng Bulacan" ("Hymn of Bulacan") | 2007 | Mandy Centeno | Jacinto Garcia | Himno ng Bulacan | Philippines |
| Bunyoro | "Bunyoro-Kitara Anthem" | Unknown | | Dr. Isebarongo Rwamirimo Nkurukenda | Bunyoro-Kitara Anthem | Uganda |
| Burgenland | "Mein Heimatvolk, mein Heimatland" ("My People, my Homeland") | 1935 | Ernst Joseph Görlich | Peter Zauner | | Austria |
| Buryatia | "Bügede Nairamdaka Buriaad Ulasai duulal" ("anthem of the Republic of Buryatia") | 1995 | Damba Zhalsarayev | Anatoliy Andreyev | Anthem of Buryatia | Russia |
| Busoga | "Tuli bankabi inhyo" ("We are highly blessed") | Unknown | | Arthur Musulube | | Uganda |
| Calabarzon | "Calabarzon March" | Unknown | Agapito M. Caritativo | | | Philippines |
| Campeche | "Himno Campechano" ("Campeche Anthem") | 2008 | Enrique Novelo Ortegón | Leandro Caballero García | | Mexico |
| Capiz | "O, Capiz" | 2006 | Charmaine O. Guartero | | | Philippines |
| Carabobo | "Himno del Estado Carabobo" ("Carabobo State Anthem") | 1908 | Santiago González Guiñán | Sebastián Díaz Peña | | Venezuela |
| Carpathian Ruthenia | "Gimn Podkarpatskih Rusinov" | 1919 | Alex Duchnovyč | Zdenek Lysko | | Ukraine |
| Catalonia | "Els Segadors" ("The Reapers") | 1899 | Emili Guanyavents | Francesc Alió | Els Segadors | Spain |
| Catanduanes | "Inang Catandungan" ("Catanduanes Beloved") | 2015 | Macario "Tang Cayong" Arcilla | | | Philippines |
| Camarines Norte | "Camarines Norte Hymn" ("Camarines Norte Anthem") | Unknown | Fe L. Calimlim | Aimon A. Buan | | Philippines |
| Camarines Sur | "Camarines Sur March" | Unknown | Luis G. Dato | Jose V. Relativo | | Philippines |
| Canary Islands | "Himno de Canarias" ("Hymn of the Canaries") | 2003 | Benito Cabrera | Teobaldo Power | Himno de Canarias | Spain |
| Cantabria | "Himno a la Montaña" ("Hymn to the Mountain") | 1987 | Juan Guerrero Urresti | | Himno a la Montaña | Spain |
| Carinthia | "Kärntner Heimatlied" ("Carinthian Homeland Song") | 1911 | Johann Thaurer von Gallenstein / Agnes Millonig | Josef Rainer von Harbach | Kärntner Heimatlied | Austria |
| Casanare Department | "Himno de Casanare" ("Anthem of Casanare") | Unknown | Isaac Tacha Niño | | | Colombia |
| Cavite | "Himno ng Kabite" ("Hymn of Cavite") | Unknown | George Canseco | | Himno ng Kabite | Philippines |
| Cagayan Valley | "Himig ng Rehiyong Dalawa" ("Region 2 Hymn") | Unknown | | Frenyx Tarongoy | | Philippines |
| Cayman Islands | "Beloved Isle Cayman" | 1930 | Unknown | | | United Kingdom |
| Cebu | "Sugbo" | 2006 | Susana Cabahug and Rogelio Serna | Angel Cabilao | Sugbo | Philippines |
| Cebu City | "Sugbuanon ako" ("I am Cebuano") | 2023 | Andro Banate | Cerj Michael | | Philippines |
| Central Luzon | "Awit ng Rehiyon III" ("Song of Region III") | Unknown | Augusto Miranda | Salvador R. Imperio | | Philippines |
| Cesar Department | "Himno del Cesar" ("Hymn of Cesar") | 1997 | Nabonazar Cogollo Ayala | Manuel Avendaño Castañeda | | Colombia |
| Ceuta | "Himno de Ceuta" ("Anthem of Ceuta") | 1934 | Luis García Rodríguez | Ángel García Ruiz and Matilde Tavera | | Spain |
| Chaco Province | "Canta tu canto Chaco" ("Sing your song Chaco") | 2007 | Martha de la Cruz Quiles | Raúl Oscar Cerruti | | Argentina |
| Chhattisgarh | "Arpa Pairi Ke Dhar" ("The Streams of Arpa and Pairi") | 2019 | Narendra Dev Verma | | | India |
| Chechnya | "Şatlaqan Illi" ("Shatlak's Song") | 2010 | Hodshy-Ahmed Kadyrov | Umar Beksultanov | Şatlaqan Illi | Russia |
| Chelyabinsk Oblast | Anthem of Chelyabinsk Oblast | Unknown | | | | Russia |
| Chiapas | "Himno a Chiapas" ("Anthem to Chiapas") | 1913 | Jose Emilio Grajales | Miguel Lara Vasallo | | Mexico |
| Chihuahua | "Himno del Estado de Chihuahua" ("Anthem of the State of Chihuahua") | 2005 | Juan Arturo Ortega Chávez | | | Mexico |
| Chuvashia | "Çăvaş Respublikin patşalăh gimnĕ" ("State Anthem of Chuvashia") | 1997 | Ille Toktash | German Lebedev | Çăvaş Respublikin patşalăh gimnĕ | Russia |
| Cieszyn Silesia | "Płyniesz Olzo po dolinie" ("You flow, Olza, down the valley") Unofficial | Unknown | Jan Kubisz | Unknown | | Czech Republic; Poland |
| Coahuila | "Himno Coahuilense" ("State Anthem of Coahuila") | 2003 | Unknown | José Luis Ulloa Pedroza | State Anthem of Coahuila | Mexico |
| Cojedes | "Himno del Estado Cojedes" ("Anthem of the State of Cojedes") | 1897 | Mauricio Pérez Lazo | Miguel Ángel Granados | | Venezuela |
| Community of Madrid | "Himno de la Comunidad de Madrid" ("Anthem of the Community of Madrid") | 1983 | Agustín García Calvo | Pablo Sorozábal Serrano | Anthem of the Community of Madrid | Spain |
| Cook Islands | "Te Atua Mou E" ("God is Truth") | 1982 | Pa Tepaeru Te Rito Ariki Lady Davis | Thomas Davis | Te Atua Mou Ea | New Zealand |
| Cordillera Administrative Region | "Cordillera Hymn" | Unknown | Julia T. Saganib | Dr. Juanita Madarang. Saganib | | Philippines |
| Corn Island | "Corn Island song" | 2010 | Arlene Hodgson | | | Nicaragua |
| Corsica | "Dio vi Salvi Regina" ("God protect the Queen") | 1735 | Francis de Geronimo | Unknown | Dio vi Salvi Regina | France |
| Cornwall | The Song of the Western Men/Trelawney (unofficial) | 1824 | Unknown | Robert Stephen Hawker | | United Kingdom |
| Cornwall | Bro Goth agan Tasow (unofficial) | Unknown | | | Bro Goth agan Tasow | United Kingdom |
| Chukotka | "Gimn Chukotskogo avtonomnogo okruga" ("Anthem of Chukotka Autonomous Okrug") | 2000 | K.N. Kelena-Zorina | | | Russia |
| Crimea | "Himn Respubliki Krym" ("Hymn of Republic of Crimea") | 2000 | Olga Golubeva | Alemdar Karamanov | Himn Respubliki Krym | Disputed between Russia and Ukraine |
| Cundinamarca Department | "Himno de Cundinamarca" ("Anthem of Cundinamarca") | 1972 | Alberto Perico Cárdenas | Hernando Rivera Páez | | Colombia |
| Curaçao | "Himno di Kòrsou" ("Anthem of Curaçao") | 1978 | Guillermo Rosario, Mae Henriquez, Enrique Muller, and Betty Doran | Frater M. Candidus Nouwens and Errol Colina | Himno di Kòrsou | Netherlands |
| Dagestan | "Klyatva" ("Oath") | 2016 | Nikolay Dorizo | Murad Kajlayev | Klyatva (Russian version) | Russia |
| Davao del Norte | "Davao del Norte Hymn" | 2025 | "Various" | Mr. Peter Ian C. Buaya | | Philippines |
| Davao Oriental | "Banwa na Madayaw" ("The Blessed City") | Unknown | | Dioscoro B. Vicentino | | Philippines |
| Delta Amacuro | "Himno del Estado Delta Amacuro" ("Anthem of the State of Delta Amacuro") | Unknown | José Joaquín de León | José Inés Richemón | | Venezuela |
| Depok | "Mars Kota Depok" ("Depok City March") | Unknown | Hj. Rini Tjakraningrat S.Sargo | | | Indonesia |
| Drenthe | "Mijn Drenthe" ("My Drenthe") unofficial | 1930 | Jan Uilenberg | | | Netherlands |
| Donetsk People's Republic | "Slav'sya, Respublika" ("Glory to the Republic") | 2017 | Natal'i Kamyninoy | Mikhaila Khokhlova | | Russia (disputed) |
| Durango | "Himno del Estado de Durango" ("Anthem of the State of Durango") | 2014 | Eliut Sebastián Navarro Hernández | Lic. Jesús Mena Saucedo | | Mexico |
| Easter Island | "¿I hē a Hotu Matu'a e hura nei?" ("Where is Hotu Matu'a living?") | 2006 | Unknown | | | Chile |
| East Java | "Mars Jawa Timur" ("March of East Java") | Unknown | Dr. H. Soekarwo, S.H., M.Hum | | | Indonesia |
| East Kalimantan | "Mars Kalimantan Timur" ("March of East Kalimantan") | Unknown | Bayu Djailani | | | Indonesia |
| England (Note: See Regional anthem of England for further information.) | "Jerusalem" | Unknown | William Blake | Hubert Parry | | United Kingdom |
| England | "Land of Hope and Glory" | Unknown | A. C. Benson | Sir Edward Elgar | Land of Hope and Glory | United Kingdom |
| Entre Ríos Province | "Marcha de Entre Ríos" ("March of Entre Ríos") | 2001 | Isidoro Rossi | Andrés Longo | Marcha entrerios | Argentina |
| Extremadura | "Himno de Extremadura " ("Hymn to Extremadura") | Unknown | José Rodríguez Pinilla | Miguel del Barco Gallego | | Spain |
| Falcón | "Himno del Estado Falcón" ("Anthem of the State of Falcón") | 1905 | Rafael Alcorcer | Elías David Curiel | | Venezuela |
| Falkland Islands | "Song of the Falklands" | 1930 | Christopher Lanham | Unknown | | United Kingdom |
| Faroe Islands | "Tú alfagra land mítt" ("Thou Fairest Land of Mine") | 1906 | Símun av Skarði | Peter Alberg | Tú alfagra land mítt | Denmark |
| Federal Territories | "Wilayah Persekutuan Maju dan Sejahtera" ("The Progressive and Prosperous Federal Territory") | 2011 | Syed Indera Syed Omar | Suhaimi Mohd Zain | Wilayah Persekutuan Maju dan Sejahtera | Malaysia |
| Flanders | "De Vlaamse Leeuw" ("The Flemish Lion") | 1973 | Hippoliet Van Peene | Karel Miry | De Vlaamse Leeuw | Belgium |
| Flevoland | "Waar wij steden doen verrijzen" ("Where We Let Cities Arise") | Unknown | Mak Zeiler | Riemer van der Meulen | | Netherlands |
| Formosa Province | "Himno de la Provincia de Formosa" ("Anthem of Formosa Province") | 1988 | Armando de Vita y Lacerra | Víctor Rival | | Argentina |
| French Polynesia | "Ia Ora 'O Tahiti Nui" ("Long Live Tahiti Nui") | 1993 | Maeva Bougues; Irmine Tehei; Angèle Terorotua; Johanna Nouveau; Patrick Amaru; Louis Mamatui; Jean-Pierre Célestin | Unknown | | France |
| Friesland | "De âlde Friezen" ("The Old Frisians") | 1876 | Eeltsje Halbertsma | Heinrich Christian Schnoor | | Netherlands |
| Friuli-Venezia Giulia | "Incuintri al doman" ("Towards Tomorrow") | 2017 | Renato Stroili Gurisatti | Valter Sivilotti | Incuintri al doman | Italy |
| Gagauzia | "Tarafım" ("My Land") | 1994 | Mihail Kolsa | | Tarafım | Moldova |
| Galicia | "Os Pinos" ("The Pinetrees") | 1907 | Eduardo Pondal | Pascual Veiga | | Spain |
| Gelderland | "Ons Gelderland" ("Our Gelderland") | 1998 | Coenradus Geerlings | | | Netherlands |
| Gelderland | "Het Geldersch Volkslied" ("The Gelderland National Anthem") unofficial | Unknown | Jan van Riemsdijk | Rombout van Riemsdijk | | Netherlands |
| Geneva | "Cé qu'è lainô" ("The one who is up there") | 2024 | Unknown | | Cé qu'è lainô | Switzerland |
| Gibraltar | "Gibraltar Anthem" | 1994 | Peter Emberley | | | United Kingdom |
| Greenland | "Nunarput utoqqarsuanngoravit" (You Our Ancient Land) | 1916 | Henrik Lund | Jonathan Petersen | Nunarput, utoqqarsuanngoravit | Denmark |
| Groningen | "Grönnens Laid" ("Song of Groningen") | 1919 | Gerhard Willem Spitzen | Gerard Roelof Jager; Frieso Molenaar | Grönnens Laid | Netherlands |
| Guam | "Stand Ye Guamanians" | 1919 | Ramon Manalisay Sablan | | Stand Ye Guamanians | United States |
| Guanajuato | "Himno de Guanajuato" ("Anthem of Guanajuato") | 2024 | Eduardo Francisco Muñoz Esquivel | | | Mexico |
| Guárico | "Himno del Estado Guárico" ("Anthem of the State of Guárico") | 1930 | Salvador Llamozas | Pedro Pablo Montenegro | | Venezuela |
| Guayaquil | "Canción al 9 de octubre" ("Song of October Ninth") | 1898 | José Joaquín de Olmedo | Ana Villamil Ycaza | Canción al 9 de octubre | Ecuador |
| Guernsey | "Sarnia Cherie" ("Dear Guernsey") | 1911 | George Deighton | Domenico Santangelo | Sarnia Cherie | United Kingdom |
| Guerrero | "Hymn to Guerrero" ("Hymn to Guerrero") | Unknown | Francisco Figueroa Mata | Margarito Damián Vargas | | Mexico |
| Gujarat | "Jai Jai Garavi Gujarat" ("Victory to Proud Gujarat!") | 2011 | Narmadashankar Dave | Unknown | | India |
| Hamburg | "Hamburg-Hymne" ("Hymn of Hamburg") | 1828 | Georg Nikolaus Bärmann | Albert Methfessel | | Germany |
| Hawaii | "Hawai'i Pono'ī" ("Hawaii's Own") | 1967 | King Kalākaua | Captain Henri Berger | Hawaiʻi ponoʻī | United States |
| Hesse | "Hessenlied" ("Song of Hesse") | 1951 | Karl Preser | Albrecht Brede | | Germany |
| Hidalgo | "Himno al Estado de Hidalgo" ("Anthem to the State of Hidalgo") | 1968 | Genaro Guzmán Mayer | Roberto Oropeza Licona | | Mexico |
| Huila Department | "Alma del Huila" ("Huila's soul") | Unknown | Luis Alberto Osorio | | | Colombia |
| Ilocos Region | "Region 1 Hymn" | Unknown | Primitivo L. Acosta Jr. | | | Philippines |
| Iloilo | "Himno sang Probinsya sang Iloilo" ("Iloilo Provincial Hymn") | 2011 | Prof. Arne Lubasan | | | Philippines |
| Ingushetia | "State Anthem of the Republic of Ingushetia" (O Land of Our Birth) | 1993 | Ramzan Tsurov | Unknown | Anthem of the Republic of Ingushetia | Russia |
| Isle of Man | "Arrane Ashoonagh dy Vannin" (O Land of Our Birth) | 2003 | William Henry Gill | | National Anthem of the Isle of Man | United Kingdom |
| Istria County | "Krasna zemljo" | 1912 | Ivan Cukon | Matko Brajša | | Croatia |
| Jakarta | "Mars DKI Jakarta" ("Jakarta SCR March") | Unknown | Bambang Sugiono & Agus Suradika | Sumarsono, Lilik Haryadi T. | | Indonesia |
| Jalisco | "Himno del estado de Jalisco" ("Anthem of the State of Jalisco") | 2010 | Moisés Guerrero López | Felipe Vázquez Barbosa | Himno del estado de Jalisco | Mexico |
| Jambi | "Himne Provinsi Jambi" ("Jambi Provincial Hymn") | Unknown | Zulbahri & Didin Siroz | | | Indonesia |
| Jászság | "Jász himnusz" ("Jász Anthem") | 2000 | Áron Gaál | László Borsodi | | Hungary |
| Jersey | "Beautiful Jersey" | 2025 | Lindsay Lennox | | | United Kingdom |
| Johor | "Lagu Bangsa Johor" ("Song of Johor") | 1897 | Hj. Mohamed Said Hj. Sulaiman | Mackertich Galistan Abdullah | State Anthem of Johor | Malaysia |
| Jura | "La Nouvelle Rauracienne" ("The New Rauracian") | 1990 | Xavier Stockmar | M. Beuchat | La Nouvelle Rauracienne | Switzerland |
| Kabardino-Balkaria | "Gosudarstvenny gimn Kabardino-Balkarii" ("State Anthem of Kabardino-Balkaria") | 1992 | Anatoly Bitsuev and Pyotr Kazharov | Khasan Kardanov | State Anthem of Kabardino-Balkaria | Russia |
| Kamchatka Krai | "Gimn Kamchatskogo Kraya" ("Anthem of Kamchatka Krai") | 2010 | Boris Dubrovin | Evgeniy Morozov | Gimn Kamchatskogo Kraya | Russia |
| Kaliningrad Oblast | Anthem of Kaliningrad Oblast | Unknown | | | | Russia |
| Kaluga Oblast | Anthem of Kaluga Oblast | Unknown | | | | Russia |
| Kalmykia | "Khalmg Tanghchin chastr" ("Anthem of the Kalmyk Republic") | 2011 | W. Şurgiyewa | A. Manjiyew | Khalmg Tanghchin chastr | Russia |
| Karakalpakstan | "Qaraqalpaqstan Respublikasınıń Mámleketlik Gimni" ("State Anthem of the Republic of Karakalpakstan") | 1993 | İbrayım Yusupov | Najimaddin Muxammaddinov | State Anthem of Karakalpakstan | Uzbekistan |
| Karelia | "Gosudarstvennyy gimn Respubliki Kareliya" ("State Anthem of the Republic of Karelia") | 1993 | Armas Mashin and Ivan Kostin | Alexander Beloborodov | Anthem of the Republic of Karelia | Russia |
| Karachay-Cherkessia | "Gimn Karachayevo-Cherkesii" ("State Anthem of Karachay-Cherkessia") | 1998 | Yu. Sozarukov | A. Daurov | State Anthem of Karachay-Cherkessia | Russia |
| Karnataka | "Jaya Bharata Jananiya Tanujate" ("Victory to you Mother Karnataka, The Daughter of Mother India!") | 2004 | Kuppali Venkatappa Puttappa | Mysore Ananthaswamy | | India |
| Kashubia | "Zemia Rodnô (Note: The anthem is used in most cultural occasions, but some local governments use the previous "Kashubian March")" ("Motherland") | 2006 | Jan Trepczyk | | | Poland |
| Kedah | "Allah Selamatkan Sultan Mahkota" ("God Bless the Crowned Sultan") | 1937 | Abdullah Syed Hussain Shahabuddin | J. A. Redhill | Allah Selamatkan Sultan Mahkota | Malaysia |
| Kemerovo Oblast | Anthem of Kemerovo Oblast | Unknown | | | | Russia |
| Kelantan | "Selamat Sultan" ("Save the Sultan") | 1927 | Mahmood bin Hamzah | Haji Mohamed bin Mohamed Saaid | Selamat Sultan | Malaysia |
| Khanty-Mansi Autonomous Okrug | "Gimn Khanty-Mansiyskogo avtonomnogo okruga" ("Anthem of Khanty-Mansi Autonomous Okrug") | 2004 | Alexander Radchenko | Alexander Radchenko and Viktor Khudoley | Anthem of Khanty-Mansi Autonomous Okrug | Russia |
| Kosrae | "Lelu Kosrae" | Unknown | | | | Micronesia |
| Krasnodar Krai | Anthem of Krasnodar Krai | Unknown | | | | Russia |
| Krasnoyarsk Krai | Anthem of Krasnoyarsk Krai | Unknown | | | | Russia |
| Khakassia | "State Anthem of the Republic of Khakassia" | 2015 | Vladislav Torosov (Russian) Şulbayeva, G. Kazaçinova (Khakas) | German Tanbayev | Hakas gïmn | Russia |
| Kurdistan | "Ey Reqîb" | 1938 | Dildar (Yunis Rauf) | Unknown | Ey Reqîb | Iraq |
| Komi Republic | "Gosudarstvenny gimn Respubliki Komi" ("Anthem of the Republic of Komi") | 2006 | Viktor Savin | | Gosudarstvenny gimn Respubliki Komi | Russia |
| Kyiv | "Yak tebe ne liubyty, Kyieve mii!" ("How Can I Not Love You, O Kyiv of Mine!") | 2014 | Dmytro Lutsenko | Ihor Shamo | | Ukraine |
| Labrador | "Ode to Labrador" | 1927 | Harry Paddon | Ernst Anschuetz | Ode to Labrador | Canada |
| La Guaira | "Carmañola Americana" ("American Carmagnole") | Unknown | | | | Venezuela |
| La Guajira Department | "Himno de La Guajira" ("Anthem of La Guajira") | Unknown | Luis Alejandro López | Carlos Espeleta Fince | | Colombia |
| Laguna | "Martsa ng Laguna" ("Laguna March") | 1993 | Unknown | Mario D. Alojado | | Philippines |
| Lanao del Norte | "Himno ng Lanao del Norte" ("Lanao del Norte Provincial Hymn") | Unknown | Eliseo Actub Gamolo | | Himno ng Lanao del Norte | Philippines |
| Lango Kingdom | "Rwot Obanga Gwok Ker Wa Me Lango" ("Almighty God uphold the Throne of Lango") | Unknown | | Col. (Rtd) Abenego Orech | | Uganda |
| Lara | "Himno del Estado Lara" ("Lara State Anthem") | 1911 | Juan Bautista Oviedo | Pedro Istúriz | | Venezuela |
| La Rioja | "Himno de La Rioja" ("Anthem of La Rioja") | 1985 | (Instrumental) | Eliseo Pinedo López | | Spain |
| La Rioja Province | "Himno de la Provincia de La Rioja" ("Anthem of the Province of La Rioja") | 2000 | Leila Mirta Marasco de Bilmezis | Francisco Frega | | Argentina |
| La Union | "La Union Hymn" | 1999 | Primitivo L. Acosta Jr. | | | Philippines |
| Lampung | "Sang Bumi Ruwa Jurai" ("One Land of Two Traditions") | Unknown | Syaiful Anwar | | | Indonesia |
| Lampung | "Mars Pemda Lampung" ("Lampung Regional Government March") | Unknown | Unknown | | | Indonesia |
| Leningrad Oblast | Anthem of Leningrad Oblast | Unknown | Unknown | | | Russia |
| Liepāja | "Pilsētā, kurā piedzimst vējš" ("The City where the Wind is Born") | 1999 | Māris Čaklais | Imants Kalniņš | | Latvia |
| Limburg (Belgium) | "Limburg mijn Vaderland" ("Limburg my fatherland") | Unknown | Gerard Krekelberg | Henri Tijssen | Limburg mijn Vaderland | Belgium |
| Limburg (Netherlands) | "Limburg mijn Vaderland" ("Limburg my fatherland") | Unknown | Gerard Krekelberg | Henri Tijssen | Limburg mijn Vaderland | Netherlands |
| Lower Austria | "Niederösterreichische Landeshymne" ("Lower Austrian State Hymn") | 1965 | Franz Karl Ginzkey | Ludwig van Beethoven | Niederösterreichische Landeshymne | Austria |
| Luhansk People's Republic | "Gimn Luganskoy Narodnoy Respubliki" ("Anthem of the Luhansk People's Republic") | 2016 | Vladimir Mikhailov | Georgy Galin | | Russia (disputed) |
| Lusatia | "Rjana Łužica" ("Beautiful Lusatia") | 1845 | Handrij Zejler | Korla Awgust Kocor | | Germany; Poland |
| Macedonia | "Macedonia xacūstē"(unofficial) ("Famous Macedonia") | Unknown | | | | Greece |
| Madeira | "Hino da Região Autónoma da Madeira" ("Hymn of the Autonomous Region of Madeira") | 1980 | Ornelas Teixeira | João Victor Costa | Hino da Região Autónoma da Madeira | Portugal |
| Madhya Pradesh | "Mera Madhya Pradesh" ("My Madhya Pradesh") | 2010 | Mahesh Shrivastava | | | India |
| Magdalena Department | "Himno del Magdalena" ("Anthem of Magdalena") | Unknown | Francisco Covilla Noguera | | | Colombia |
| Maharashtra | "Jai Jai Maharashtra Majha" ("Victory to My Maharashtra!") | 2023 | Raja Badhe | Shrinivas Khale | | India |
| Manabí Province | "Himno de Manabí" ("Anthem of Manabí") | Unknown | Dr. Rodrigo Pesántez Rodas | Dr. Eduardo Brito Mieles | Himno de Manabí | Ecuador |
| Manila | "Awit ng Maynila" ("Song of Manila") | Unknown | Amado V. Hernandez | Felipe Padilla de Leon | Awit ng Maynila | Philippines |
| Mari El | "State Anthem of the Mari El Republic" | 1992 | Yuri Toyvars-Yevdokimov (Mari); VL. Panov (Russian) | D. Islamov | State Anthem of the Mari El Republic | Russia |
| Marinduque | "Himno ng Marinduque" ("Marinduque Hymn") | Unknown | | | Himno ng Marinduque | Philippines |
| Malacca | "Melaka Maju Jaya" ("Successful Malacca") | 1957 | Saiful Bahri | | State Anthem of Malacca | Malaysia |
| Manipur | "Sana Leibak Manipur" ("Manipur, Land of Gold") | 2021 | Bachaspatimayum Jayantakumar Sharma | Aribam Syam Sharma | | India |
| Martinique | "Ansanm" ("Together") | 2023 | Unknown | | | France |
| Melilla | "Himno de Melilla" ("Anthem of Melilla") | Unknown | Ana Riaño López | Aurelia Eulalia López Martín | | Spain |
| Mendoza Province | "Canto a Mendoza" ("Song to Mendoza") | 1950 | Guillermo Pelay | Egidio Pittaluga | | Argentina |
| Mérida | "Himno del Estado Mérida" ("Mérida State Anthem") | Unknown | Antonio Febres Cordero | Gil Antonio Gil | | Venezuela |
| Meta Department | "Ay Mi Llanura" ("Oh My Plains") | 1979 | Arnulfo Briceño | | | Colombia |
| Metro Manila | "NCR Hymn" | 2007 | W.D. Nesbit | Servillano A. Padiz, Jr. | | Philippines |
| Mexico | "Himno al Estado de México" ("Anthem of the State of Mexico") | Unknown | Heriberto Enríquez Rodríguez | Manuel Esquivel Durán | Himno al Estado de México | Mexico |
| Mexico City | "Himno de la Ciudad de México" ("Anthem of Mexico City") | 2024 | Marcela Rodríguez | | | Mexico |
| Michoacán | "Himno de Michoacán" ("Anthem of Michoacán") | 2024 | Refugio Armando Salgado Morales | Luis Josué Soto Campos | | Mexico |
| Miranda | "Himno del Estado Miranda" ("Miranda State Anthem") | 1909 | Jacinto Áñez | Germán Lira | | Venezuela |
| Misamis Oriental | "Misamis Oriental Hymn" | 2019 | Concordio C. Diel | Unknown | Misamis Oriental Hymn | Philippines |
| Misiones Province | "Misionerita" ("Missionary") | 2000 | Lucas Braulio Areco | Ariel Ramírez | | Argentina |
| Monagas | "Himno del Estado Monagas" ("Monagas State Anthem") | 1915 | Idelfonso Núñez | Carlos Mohle | | Venezuela |
| Montserrat | "Motherland" | 2013 | Howard Fergus Edited by Dominick Archer | George Irish | Motherland | United Kingdom |
| Moravia | "Jsem Moravan (unofficial)" ("I am Moravian") | Unknown | V. Novotný | K. Pivoda | Jsem Moravan | Czech Republic |
| Mordovia | "Šumbrat, Mordovija!" ("Hail, Mordovia!") | Unknown | S. Kinyakin | N. Koshilieva | Šumbrat, Mordovija! | Russia |
| Morelos | "Marcha Morelense" ("Morelos March") | Unknown | Manuel León Díaz | | | Mexico |
| Moscow | "Moya Moskva" ("My Moscow") | 1995 | Sergey Agranyan Mark Lisyansky | Isaak Dunayevsky | | Russia |
| Nagano Prefecture | "Shinano no Kuni" ("The Country of Shinano") | 1968 | Asai Retsu | Kitamura Sueharu | Shinano no Kuni | Japan |
| Nariño Department | "Himno del Departamento de Nariño" ("Anthem of the Department of Nariño") | Unknown | Dr. Alberto Quijano Guerrero | Señor Luis Ignacio Martínez | | Colombia |
| Navarre | "Himno de las Cortes / Gorteen Ereserkia" ("Anthem of the Courts") | 1993 | Manuel Iribarren Paternáin (Spanish) / José María Azpíroz Zabaleta (Basque) | Aurelio Sagaseta | Himno de las Cortes | Spain |
| Nayarit | "Himno de Nayarit" ("Anthem of Nayarit") | 2017 | José Luis Martínez López | Javier Ayala Fernández | | Mexico |
| New Caledonia | "Soyons unis, devenons frères" ("Let Us Unite, Let Us Become Brothers") | 2010 | Unknown | | | France |
| Newfoundland and Labrador | "Ode to Newfoundland" | 1902 | Charles Cavendish Boyle | Hubert Parry | Ode to Newfoundland | Newfoundland (Note: National anthem of the Dominion of Newfoundland from 1907–1949.); Canada |
| Negeri Sembilan | "Berkatlah Yang DiPertuan Besar Negeri Sembilan" ("Bless the Great Lord of Negeri Sembilan") | 1911 | Tuanku Muhammad | Andrew Caldecott | Berkatlah Yang DiPertuan Besar Negeri Sembilan | Malaysia |
| Negros Occidental | "Matuod nga Negrosanon" ("True Negrosanon") | Unknown | Joel "Bagguer" Villaluz | | | Philippines |
| Negros Oriental | "Garbo sa Kabisay-an" ("Pride of the Visayas") | 2002 | Mamerto Villegas | | | Philippines |
| Nenets Autonomous Okrug | "Gimn Nenetskogo avtonomnogo okruga" ("Anthem of Nenets Autonomous Okrug") | 2008 | Inga Artejeva | Tatjjana Artemjva | Anthem of Nenets Autonomous Okrug | Russia |
| Neuquén Province | "Himno de la Provincia del Neuquén" ("Anthem of the Province of Neuquén") | 1991 | Osvaldo Arabarco and Marcelo Berbel | Marcelo Berbel | | Argentina |
| Nueva Esparta | "Himno del Estado Nueva Esparta" ("Nueva Esparta State Anthem") | 1870 | Miguel Ángel Mata Silva | Benigno Rodríguez Bruzual | | Venezuela |
| Nueva Ecija | "Awit ng Nueva Ecija" ("Song of Nueva Ecija") | Unknown | Dr. Jose M. Sison | Vicente A. Salcedo | | Philippines |
| Niue | "Ko e Iki he Lagi" ("The Lord in Heaven") | 1974 | Unknown | | Ko e Iki he Lagi | New Zealand |
| Norfolk Island | "Come Ye Blessed" | 1917 | John Prindle Scott | | | Australia |
| Norte de Santander Department | "Himno de Norte de Santander" ("Anthem of Norte de Santander") | 1984 | Teodoro Gutiérrez Calderón | José Rozo Contreras | Himno de Norte de Santander | Colombia |
| North Holland | "Noord-Hollands volkslied" ("Anthem of North Holland") | 2000 | P.J. Ferdinant | Sytze de Vries | | Netherlands |
| Northern Ireland | "Londonderry Air" | Unknown | Jane Ross | Unknown | Londonderry Air | United Kingdom |
| North Kalimantan | "Mars Kalimantan Utara" ("March of North Kalimantan") | Unknown | Addie MS | | | Indonesia |
| North Ossetia-Alania | "Ţægat Irâstonâ padƨaxon himn" ("Anthem of the Republic of North Ossetia-Alania") | 1995 | Kamal Khodov | Tsorionov, Makoev | Ţægat Irâstonâ padƨaxon himn | Russia |
| Northern Mariana Islands | "Gi Talo Gi Halom Tasi" ("In the Middle of the Sea") | 1996 | David Kapileo Taulamwaar Peter | Wilhelm Ganzhorn | "Gi Talo Gi Halom Tasi" | United States |
| Nueva Vizcaya | "Vizcaya Hymn" | 2012 | Jaime M. Macadangdang | | | Philippines |
| Nuevo León | "Himno de Nuevo León" ("Anthem of the State of Nuevo León") | 1986 | Abiel Mascareñas | Patricio Gómez Junco | "Canto a Nuevo León" | Mexico |
| Nunatsiavut | "Labradorimiut" ("Son of Labrador") | 2005 | Sydney Dicker of Nain | | | Canada |
| Oaxaca | "Dios Nunca Muere"(de facto) ("God Never Dies") | Unknown | Vicente Garrido Calderón | Macedonio Alcalá | Dios Nunca Muere | Mexico |
| Occitania | "Se Canta" ("If it sings") | Unknown | Gaston III Fébus | | Se Canta | France |
| Occitania | "Se Canta" ("If it sings") | Unknown | Gaston III Fébus | | Se Canta | Italy |
| Occitania | "Se Canta" ("If it sings") | Unknown | Gaston III Fébus | | Se Canta | Spain |
| Odisha | "Bande Utkala Janani" ("I Bow to Thee, O Mother Utkala!") | 2020 | Laxmikanta Mohapatra | Balakrushna Dash | Bande Utkala Janani | India |
| Ontario | "A Place to Stand, a Place to Grow" | 1967 | Richard Morris | Dolores Claman, Jerry Toth | | Canada |
| Omsk Oblast | Anthem of Omsk Oblast | Unknown | | | | Russia |
| Oriental Mindoro | "Martsa ng Silangang Mindoro" ("Oriental Mindoro March") | 2011 | Mrs. Amparo G. Briones | Mr. Tagumpay Rivera | | Philippines |
| Overijssel | "Aan de rand van Hollands gouwen" ("On the edge of Holland's district") | 1951 | Johan Polman | | | Netherlands |
| Pahang | "Allah Rahmatkan Raja Kami" ("God Bless our King") | 1923 | Dorothy Lilian Swarder | | State Anthem of Pahang | Malaysia |
| Pampanga | "Imno ning Kapampangan" | 1988 | Vedasto Ocampo, Serafin Lacson and Jose Gallardo | Gregorio Canlas | Imno ning Kapampangan | Philippines |
| Pando Department | "Himno a Pando" ("Hymn to Pando") | 1938 | Walter Femandez C. | Fortunato D. Uribe | | Bolivia |
| Pangasinan | "Luyag Ko Tan Yaman" | 2011 | Raul Tamayo | Deneo V. Tamayo | Luyag Ko Tan Yaman | Philippines |
| Pasig | "Martsa ng Pasig" ("Pasig March") | 1975 | Unknown | Victor Belen y Halili | Martsa ng Pasig | Philippines |
| Perak | "Allah Lanjutkan Usia Sultan" ("God Bless His Majesty, The Sultan") | 1901 | Sultan Abdullah | Pierre Jean de Beranger | State Anthem of Perak | Malaysia |
| Perlis | "Amin amin ya Rabaljalil" | 1935 | Syed Hamzah ibni al-Marhum Syed Safi Jamalullail | | State Anthem of Perlis | Malaysia |
| Penang | "Untuk Negeri Kita" ("For Our State") | Unknown | Zainal Alam | | State Anthem of Penang | Malaysia |
| Penza Oblast | Anthem of Penza Oblast | Unknown | Unknown | | | Russia |
| Piedmont | "Ël Drapò a deuv vive" ("The Flag must live") | 2024 | Camillo Brero | Fulvio Creux | | Italy |
| Pitcairn Islands | "We from Pitcairn Island" | Unknown | Melva Evans / L. A. J. Webster | Frederick Lehman | | United Kingdom |
| Portuguesa | "Himno del Estado Portuguesa" ("Anthem of the Portuguesa State") | Unknown | Jesús Alvarado | Fernando Eduardo Delgado | | Venezuela |
| Primorje-Gorski Kotar | "Zavičaju tebi" ("To You O Land") | 2011 | Ante Pecotić | | | Croatia |
| Primorsky Krai | Primorsky, Our Krai! | Unknown | | | | Russia |
| Prince Edward Island | "The Island Hymn" | 2010 | Lucy Maud Montgomery | Lawrence W. Watson | | Canada |
| Provence | "Canson de la Copa" | | Micolau Sabòli | Frederic Mistrau | | France |
| Puducherry | "Tamil Thai Valthu" ("Invocation to Mother Tamil") | 2007 | Bharathidasan | L. Krishnan | | India |
| Puebla | "Himno al Estado de Puebla" ("Anthem to the State of Puebla") | 2001 | Josefina Esparza Soriano | Juan Arturo Ortega Chávez | | Mexico |
| Puerto Rico | "La Borinqueña" ("The Borinquen Song") | 1868 | Lola Rodríguez de Tió | Félix Astol Artés | La Borinqueña | United States |
| Quebec | "Gens du pays" ("People of the Nation") | 1975 | Gilles Vigneault | Gilles Vigneault, Gaston Rochon | | Canada |
| Querétaro | "Viva Querétaro" ("Long live Querétaro!") | 2014 | Luis Olvera Montaño | José Maldonado | | Mexico |
| Quezon | "Lalawigan ng Quezon" ("Quezon Hymn") | 2012 | Unknown | Jose “Pepe” Merto | | Philippines |
| Quezon City | "Awit ng Lungsod Quezon" ("Song of Quezon City") | Unknown | Ligaya Perez | Dr. Eliseo Pajaro | Awit ng Lungsod Quezon | Philippines |
| Quindío Department | "Himno del Quindío" ("Anthem of Quindío") | Unknown | Jorge Robledo Ortiz | Luis Uribe Bueno | | Colombia |
| Quintana Roo | "Himno a Quintana Roo" ("Anthem of Quintana Roo") | 1986 | Ramón Iván Suárez Caamal | Marco Ramírez Canul | | Mexico |
| Quito | "Himno a Quito" ("Hymn to Quito") | 1944 | Fray Bernardino Echeverría | Fray Agustín de Azkúnaga | | Ecuador |
| Réunion | "Petite fleur aimée" ("Little Beloved Flower") | 1930 | Georges Fourcade | Jules Fossy | Petite Fleur aimée | France |
| Rîbnița District | "Gimn Rybnicy" ("Hymn of Rîbnița") | 2014 | Unknown | Alexander Tokarev | Gimn Rybnicy | Moldova (de jure); Transnistria (de facto) |
| Río Negro Province | "Himno a Río Negro" ("Hymn to Río Negro") | 1975 | Raúl Entraigas | Salvador Gallo | | Argentina |
| Rizal | "Rizal Mabuhay" ("Long Live Rizal") | Unknown | Fred Villanueva | | Rizal Mabuhay | Philippines |
| Romblon | "Sulong Romblon" ("Forward Romblon") | Unknown | Unknown | Dan Fabella | | Philippines |
| Rwenzururu | "Rwenzururu Wethu" ("Our Rwenzururu") | 2008 | Unknown | | | Uganda |
| Saarland | "Saarlandlied" ("The Saarland Tune") | 1956 | Richard Limberger / Karl Hogrebe | Karl Hogrebe | | Germany |
| Saint Barthélemy | "L'Hymne a St. Barthélemy" ("The Hymn to Saint Barthelemy") | Unknown | Isabelle Massart Déravin | Michael Valenti | L'Hymne a St. Barthélemy | France |
| Saint Helena | "My Saint Helena Island" | 1975 | Dave Mitchell | | | United Kingdom |
| Republika Srpska | "Moja Republika" ("My Republic") | 2008 | Mladen Matović | | Moja republika | Bosnia and Herzegovina |
| Rostov Oblast | Anthem of Rostov Oblast | 1996 | Fodor Anisimov | Alexander Listopadov | Vskolykhnulsya, Vzvolnovalsya Pravoslavnyy Tikhiy Don | Russia |
| Saba | "Saba you rise from the ocean" | 1985 | Christina Maria Jeurissen | | Saba you rise from the ocean | Netherlands |
| Sabah | "Sabah Tanah Airku" ("Sabah My Homeland") | 1988 | Unknown | H.B. Hermann | Sabah Tanah Airku | Malaysia |
| Sakha Republic | "Saxa Öröspüübulüketin örögöyün yryata" ("National Anthem of the Republic of Sakha") | 1993 | S. Tarasov and M. Timofeyev | K. Gerasimov | Saxa Öröspüübulüketin örögöyün yryata | Russia |
| Salta Province | "Himno de la provincia de Salta" ("Anthem of the province of Salta") | 2010 | José Argentino Di Giulio | | | Argentina |
| Salzburg | "Salzburger Landeshymne" ("Salzburg State Hymn") | 1928 | Anton Pichler | Ernst Sompek | Salzburger Landeshymne | Austria |
| San Andrés and Providencia | "Himno de San Andrés y Providencia" ("Hymn of San Andrés and Providencia") | 1971 | Poeta Eduardo Carranza | Maestro José Rozo Contreras | | Colombia |
| Santa Cruz Department | "Himno a Santa Cruz" ("Hymn to Santa Cruz") | 1920 | Felipe Leonor Ribera | Gastón Guillaux Humery | | Bolivia |
| Santander Department | "Himno de Santander" ("Anthem of Santander") | 1888 | Pablo Rueda Arciniegas | Jesús Pinzón Urrea | | Colombia |
| Sarangani | "Sarangani, Land of Beauty" | Unknown | Lorimer 'dindo' J. Olario | | | Philippines |
| Sarawak | "Ibu Pertiwiku" ("My Motherland") | 1988 | Dato' Haji Wan Othman Ismail Hassan | | Ibu Pertiwiku | Malaysia |
| Sardinia | "Su patriotu sardu a sos feudatarios" ("The Sardinian Patriot to the Lords") | 2018 | Frantziscu Ignatziu Mannu | Various interpreters | | Italy |
| Savoy | "Le Chant des Allobroges" ("The Song of the Allobroges") | Unknown | Joseph Dessaix | Giuseppe Conterno | | France |
| Saxony-Anhalt | "Lied für Sachsen-Anhalt" ("Song for Saxony-Anhalt") | 1991 | Klaus Adolphi | | | Germany |
| Schleswig-Holstein | "Wanke nicht, mein Vaterland" ("Do not falter, my fatherland") | Unofficial anthem | Matthäus Friedrich Chemnitz | Carl Gottlieb Bellmann | | Germany |
| Scotland | "Flower of Scotland" | 1966 | Roy Williamson | | Flower of Scotland | United Kingdom |
| Scotland | "Scotland the Brave" | 1870s | Cliff Hanley | unknown | Scotland the Brave | United Kingdom |
| Selangor | "Duli Yang Maha Mulia" | 1967 | Unknown | Saiful Bahri | Duli Yang Maha Mulia | Malaysia |
| Sint Eustatius | "Golden Rock" | 2004/2010 | Pieter A. van den Heuvel | Jan Morks | Golden Rock | Netherlands |
| Sint Maarten | "O Sweet Saint Martin's Land" | 1958 | Gerard Kemps | | O Sweet Saint Martin's Land | Netherlands |
| Saint-Martin | "O Sweet Saint Martin's Land" | 1958 | Gerard Kemps | | O Sweet Saint Martin's Land | France |
| Saint Petersburg | "Gimn Sankt-Peterburga" ("Anthem of Saint Petersburg") | 2003 | Oleg Chuprov | Reinhold Glière | Gimn Sankt-Peterburga | Russia |
| Sapmi | "Sámi soga lávlla" ("Song of the Sami People") | 1986 | Isak Saba | Arne Sørbil | | Finland; Norway; Sweden |
| Samara Oblast | Anthem of Samara Oblast | Unknown | | | | Russia |
| Sevastopol | Legendary Sevastopol | Unknown | | | | Disputed between Russia and Ukraine |
| Shan State | "Koám Đăng Tsom Piu" ("Our Race is a Race of Kings") | 1947 | Dr Panyan | | | Myanmar |
| Sicily | "Madreterra" ("Mother earth") | 2003 | Vincenzo Spampinato | Vincenzo Spampinato | Madreterra | Italy |
| Sinaloa | "Himno de Sinaloa" ("State of Sinaloa Anthem") | 2013 | Faustino López Osuna | | Himno de Sinaloa | Mexico |
| Sonora | "Himno de Sonora" ("Anthem of Sonora") | Unknown | Unknown | Raúl Castell or Adolfo de la Huerta | | Mexico |
| Sorsogon | "Marcha nin Sorsogon" ("Sorsogon March") | Unknown | Unknown | | | Philippines |
| South Sulawesi | "Mars Sulawesi Selatan" ("March of South Sulawesi") | Unknown | Arifin Manggau | | | Indonesia |
| South Tangerang | "Mars Kota Tangerang Selatan" ("March of South Tangerang City") | Unknown | Al Mansyur, Yeni Widhawati and M. Anwar Gan | | | Indonesia |
| South Caribbean Coast Autonomous Region | "Himno de la Autonomía" ("Hymn of the Autonomia") | Unknown | | | | Nicaragua |
| South Holland | "Lied van Zuid-Holland" ("Song of South Holland") | 1950 | L.C. Winkelman | H.G. Lukkien | | Netherlands |
| South Tyrol | "Bozner Bergsteigerlied" ("Bozen mountaineer song") (unofficial) | 1926 | Karl Felderer | Unknown | Bozner Bergsteigerlied | Italy |
| Special Region 1 of the Union of Myanmar | "Gòng fù róng chāng " ("Achieving prosperity together") | Unknown | Wang Ziyu | | | Myanmar |
| Split-Dalmatia | "Čuj dozivlju časni pređi" ("Listen the Noble Ancestors Call") | 1995 | Ljubo Stipišić | | | Croatia |
| Styria | "Dachsteinlied" ("Dachstein Song") | 1929 | Unknown | | Steirische Landeshymne | Austria |
| Sucre | "Himno del Estado Sucre" ("Sucre State Anthem") | 1916 | Ramón David León | Benigno Rodríguez Bruzual | | Venezuela |
| Székely Land | "Székely himnusz" ("Székely Anthem") | 2009 | György Csanády | Kálmán Mihalik | Székely himnusz | Romania |
| Tabasco | "Marcha Tabasco" ("Tabasco March") | 2008 | Ramón Galguera Noverola | Efraín Pérez Cámara | Marcha Tabasco | Mexico |
| Táchira | "Himno del Estado Táchira" ("Táchira State Anthem") | 1912 | Ramón Eugenio Vargas | Miguel Ángel Espinel | Himno del Estado Táchira | Venezuela |
| Taguig | "Martsa ng Taguig" ("Taguig March") | 2022 | Lt. Col. Demetrio E. De Jesus | Victoriano R. Dimaguila | Martsa ng Taguig | Philippines |
| Tarlac | "Awit ng Tarlac" ("Tarlac Song") | Unknown | Rodolfo C. de Leon | Celso Balmores | | Philippines |
| Tambov Oblast | Farewell of Slavianka | 1937 | various | Vasily Agapkin | Farewell of Slavianka | Russia |
| Tamil Nadu | "Tamil Thai Valthu" ("Invocation to Mother Tamil") | 2021 | Manonmaniam Sundaram Pillai | M. S. Viswanathan | | India |
| Tarija Department | "Himno a Tarija" ("Anthem to Tarija") | 1893 | Tomás O’Connor D'Arlach | Juan Fiori | | Bolivia |
| Tasmania | "Tasmanian National Anthem" unofficial | 1870 | Frederick Augustus Packer | | | Australia |
| Tatarstan | "Tatarstan Cömhüriäte Däwlät gimnı" ("State Anthem of the Republic of Tatarstan") | 1993 | Ramazan Baytimerov | Röstäm Yaxin | Anthem of the Republic of Tatarstan | Russia |
| Tamaulipas | "Himno de Tamaulipas" ("Anthem to Tamaulipas") | 1926 | Rafael Antonio Pérez Pérez | Alfredo Tamayo Marín | | Mexico |
| Telangana | "Jaya Jaya He Telangana" ("Victory to Mother Telangana!") | 2024 | Ande Sri | | | India |
| Terengganu | "Selamat Sultan" ("Save the Sultan") | 1927 | Mohamad Hashim bin Abu Bakar | | Selamat Sultan | Malaysia |
| Teso Kingdom | "Ekosio Loka Einos Loka Iteso" ("Anthem of the Iteso Land") | Unknown | | Ariko Rose Mary | | Uganda |
| Tierra del Fuego Province | "Marcha de las Malvinas" ("March of the Malvinas") | 2017 | Carlos Obligado | Jose Tieri | | Argentina |
| Tlaxcala | "Himno a Tlaxcala" ("Anthem of Tlaxcala") | 1986 | Carlos Cea y Díaz | | | Mexico |
| Tokelau | "Te Atua o Tokelau" ("The God of Tokelau") | 2012 | Eric Lemuelu Falima | | Te Atua o Tokelau | New Zealand |
| Tolima Department | "Bunde Tolimense" ("Anthem of Tolima") | 1959 | Nicanor Velázquez | Alberto Castilla | | Colombia |
| Tooro | "Agutamba" ("His Majesty") | 1945 | Unknown | George Magwara | Agutamba | Uganda |
| Turks and Caicos Islands | "This Land of Ours" | Unknown | Conrad Howell | | | United Kingdom |
| Transylvania | "Siebenbürgenlied" ("Transylvania Song") | 1846 | Maximilian Leopold Moltke | Johann Lukas Hedwig | | Romania |
| Trentino | "Inno al Trentino" ("Hymn to Trentino") | 1911 | Ernesta Bittanti Battisti | Guglielmo Bussoli | Inno al Trentino | Italy |
| Trujillo | "Himno del Estado Trujillo" ("Trujillo State Anthem") | 1911 | Antonio Pacheco | Esteban Rasquin | | Venezuela |
| Tuva | "Men – Tyva Men" | 2011 | Bayantsagaan Oohiy | Olonbayar Gantomir | Men – Tyva Men | Russia |
| Udmurtia | "Šundy sios džuato palėzez" ("Sun Shines in Scarlet Dogberry Bushes") | 2002 | T. Vladikin and A. Sheptalin | German and Alexander Korepanov | "Шунды сиос ӝуато палэзез" | Russia |
| Ulyanovsk Oblast | Anthem of Ulyanovsk Oblast | Unknown | | | | Russia |
| United States Virgin Islands | "Virgin Islands March" | 1963 | Alton Adams | Sam Williams | "Virgin Islands March" | United States |
| Upper Austria | "Hoamatgsang" ("Homeland Song") | 1952 | Franz Stelzhamer | Hans Schnopfhagen | "Hoamatgsang" | Austria |
| Utrecht | "Langs de Vecht en d'oude Rijnstroom" ("Along the Vecht and the old Rhine River") | 1953 | Jan Küppers | Henry Smart | | Netherlands |
| Uttarakhand | "Uttarakhand Devabhumi Matribhumi" ("Uttarakhand, Land of the Gods, O Motherland!") | 2016 | Hemant Bisht | Narendra Singh Negi | | India |
| Tyrol | "Andreas-Hofer-Lied" ("Andreas Hofer Song") | 1948 | Julius Mosen | Leopold Knebelsberger | Andreas-Hofer-Lied | Austria |
| British Virgin Islands | "Oh, Beautiful Virgin Islands" | 2013 | Ayana Hull | Ayana Hull and Kareem-Nelson Hull | | United Kingdom |
| Valais | "Walliser Lied/Notre Valais" ("Valais Song / Our Valais") | 2016 | Leo Luzian von Roten | Ferdinand Othon Wolf | Walliser Lied | Switzerland |
| Valais | "Marignan" | 2016 | (Instrumental) | Jean Daetwyler | | Switzerland |
| Valencia | "Himne de l'Exposició" ("Anthem of Valencia") | 1909 | Maximilià Thous i Orts | Josep Serrano Simeón | "Himne de l'Exposició" | Spain |
| Valle del Cauca Department | "Himno al Valle del Cauca" ("Anthem to the Valle del Cauca") | 1967 | José Ignacio Tamayo amd Pablo Emilio Camacho Perea | Santiago Velasco Llanos | Himno al Valle del Cauca | Colombia |
| Vaud | "Hymne vaudois" ("The Vaudese Anthem") | 1803 | Samuel-Henri Rochat | | | Switzerland |
| Veracruz | "Himno Veracruzano" ("Veracruz Anthem") | 2005 | Francisco Morosini Cordero | Ryszard Siwy Machalica | | Mexico |
| Vladimir Oblast | "Gimn Vladimirskoj Oblasti"(unofficial) ("Anthem of Vladimir Oblast") | 2014 | Andrei Filinov | Alexei Sidortsev | Gimn Vladimirskoj Oblasti | Russia |
| Vorarlberg | "'s Ländle, meine Heimat" ("Vorarlberg, my Homeland") | 1949 | Anton Schmutzer | | "’s Ländle, meine Heimat" | Austria |
| Wales | "Hen Wlad Fy Nhadau" ("Land of my Fathers") | 1856 | Evan James | James James | Hen Wlad Fy Nhadau | United Kingdom |
| Wallonia | "Le Chant des Wallons" ("The Song of the Walloons") | 1998 | Théophile Bovy | Louis Hillier | "Le Chant des Wallons" | Belgium |
| West Bengal | "Banglar Mati Banglar Jol" ("The Soil of Bengal, The Water of Bengal") | 2023 | Rabindranath Tagore | | Banglar Mati Banglar Jol | India |
| Western Australia | "Western Australia" | 2013 | Rod Christian | | | Australia |
| Yamalo-Nenets Autonomous Okrug | "Gimn Yamalo-Nenetskogo avtonomnogo okruga" ("Anthem of Yamalo-Nenets Autonomous Okrug") | 2010 | Lyudmila Khodunova | Yuri Yunkerov | "Anthem of Yamalo-Nenets Autonomous Okrug" | Russia |
| Yaracuy | "Himno del Estado Yaracuy" ("Yaracuy State Anthem") | 1911 | Pedro María Sosa | Abdón Ramírez | | Venezuela |
| Yogyakarta | "Mars Pemerintah Daerah Istimewa Yogyakarta" ("Regional Anthem of the Special Region of Yogyakarta") | Unknown | Bakti Setyaji | | | Indonesia |
| Yorkshire | "On Ilkla Moor Baht 'at" ("On Ilkley Moor without a hat") | Unknown | | Thomas Clark | | United Kingdom |
| Yucatán | "Himno de Yucatán" ("Anthem of Yucatán") | 1868 | Manuel Palomeque Solís and José García Montero (original) Luis Pérez Sabido (updated) | José Jacinto Cuevas | | Mexico |
| Zacatecas | "Marcha de Zacatecas" ("March of Zacatecas") | 1892 | Genaro Codina | Fernando Villalpando | "Marcha de Zacatecas" | Mexico |
| Zambales | "Marcha Zambaleño" ("March of the Zambaleans") | Unknown | Prof. Mateo Fredeluces | | | Philippines |
| Zamboanga del Sur | "Zamboanga del Sur March" | Unknown | Julián Felipe | José Palma | | Philippines |
| Zanzibar | "Unguja na Pemba" ("Zanzibar and Pemba") | 2004 | Unknown | | | Tanzania |
| Zeeland | "Zeeuws volkslied" ("Zeelandic Anthem") | 1919 | Daniël Adrianus Poldermans | Johannes Morks | | Netherlands |
| Zulia | "Sobre Palmas" ("Zulia State Anthem") | 1909 | Udón Perez | José Antonio Cháves | Sobre Palmas | Venezuela |

== See also ==
- List of former national anthems
- List of national anthems
- National anthem
- Personal anthem

Regional anthems by country

- List of British anthems
- Regional anthems of Finland
- List of Indian state anthems
- List of prefecture songs of Japan
- State anthems of Malaysia
- Anthems of the autonomous communities of Spain
- List of U.S. state songs
- List of anthems of Venezuela

Former countries

- Anthems of the Soviet Republics

== Bibliography ==
- HDS (2018). "Ante Pecotić". Hrvatsko društvo skladatelja (in Serbo-Croatian).
- PGŽ (2020). "Službena obilježja" [Official Emblems]. Primorsko-goranska županija (in Serbo-Croatian).
