= Ons Gelderland =

Anthem of the province of Gelderland in the Netherlands

External audio
- "Ons Gelderland" (MP3 file) performed by the choir Tricolore Gelria

"Ons Gelderland" (Our Gelderland) is the anthem of the province of Gelderland in the Netherlands.

There are two versions of the song. The first, 'Ons Gelderland' is sung the most, but the second, 'het Geldersch Volkslied', is considered by many to be the official anthem. Since Gelderland is a province, and not a country, the officiality of either one remains undecided. Nowadays, the provincial government of Gelderland displays 'Ons Gelderland' on their website. In the past they have stated 'het Geldersch Volkslied' to be the official anthem.

A remarkable detail to note is that each version can be sung to the same tune. Since the texts have already been put to different tunes, this is a surprisingly convenient coincidence for many songwriters in Gelderland.

== Lyrics ==
Text and music by C.J.C. Geerlings.

Waar der beuken breede kronen
Ons heur koele schaduw biên;
Waar we groene dennebosschen,
Paarse heidevelden zien;
Waar de blonde roggeakker
En het beekje ons oog bekoort,
Daar is onze Vale ouwe,
Kost'lijk deel van Gelre's oord.
Daar is onze Vale ouwe,
Kost'lijk deel van Gelre's oord.

Waar bij zomerzon de boomgaard
Kleurig ooft den wand'laar toont,
En de vruchtb're korenakker
Stagen arbeid rijk'lijk loont;
Waar het aorige rivierke
Rustig stroomt langs groenen boord,
Daar is onze rijke Betuw
Kost'lijk deel van Gelre's oord.
Daar is onze rijke Betuw
Kost'lijk deel van Gelre's oord.

Waar kasteelen statig prijzen
Rond door park en bosch omringd,
Waar het voog'lenkoor zijn lied'ren
In het dichte loover zingt;
Waar het lief'lijk schoon na 't landschap
't Oog des schilders steeds bekoort,
Daar is onze "olde Graafschap",
Kost'lijk deel van Gelre's oord.
Daar is onze "olde Graafschap",
Kost'lijk deel van Gelre's oord.

== Structure ==
Each couplet sings about one of the three part of Gelderland: first the Veluwe, then the Betuwe and lastly the Achterhoek or Graafschap (which literally means: County or Earldom).

The song is written in a dated form of the Dutch language, with some remarkable Brabantic influences, possibly because Kleverlandish is one of the many dialects spoken in Gelderland.

== Geldersch Volkslied ==
Text by Jan van Riemsdijk, original music by Rombout van Riemsdijk

Gelders dreven zijn de mooiste
In ons dierbaar Nederland.
Vette klei- en heidegronden,
Beken, bosch en heuvelrand.
Ginds de Waal, daar weer de IJssel,
Dan de Maas en ook de Rijn
Geeft ons recht om heel ons leven
Trotsch op Gelderland te zijn.
Geeft ons recht om heel ons leven
Trotsch op Gelderland te zijn.

Waar ons vaderland bebouwd werd
Door den Saksischen Germaan,
Daar werd onze stam geboren,
Daar is Gelderland ontstaan.
En het graan, dat thans geoogst wordt,
Waar het woest en wild eens was
Geeft ons recht om trotsch te wezen,
Op ons echt Gelders ras.
Geeft ons recht om trotsch te wezen,
Op ons echt Gelders ras.

In de dorpen en de steden
Tusschen Brabant en de Zee,
Tussen Utrecht en Westfalen
Heerscht de welvaart en de vreê!
Met je kerken en kasteelen,
Met je huisjes aan den dijk,
Gelderland, jij bent de Parel
Van ons Hollandsch koninkrijk.
Gelderland, jij bent de Parel
Van ons Hollandsch koninkrijk.

=== Structure of 'het Geldersch Volkslied' ===
The first couplet sings about the geography of Gelderland. The second sings about the history and the third couplet is more of a hymn to Gelderland, praising it as the Pearl of the Netherlands.

This anthem is again written in an old form of Dutch, albeit somewhat more modern in language than 'Ons Gelderland'.

=== Hollands vs. Nederlands ===
The last lines are disputed, and often sung differently. They talk about a kingdom of Holland, which essentially is nonexistent. Often, the phrase is sung "Van ons Neêrlands koninkrijk" which instead talks about the kingdom of the Netherlands, from which Gelderland is a province. Some people from the Netherlands living outside the provinces North Holland and South Holland strongly object against the use of Holland as pars pro toto when denoting the entire Netherlands (see also: 'Netherlands (terminology)'). This is often also the case in Gelderland, hence the alterations.
