= Luyag Ko Tan Yaman =

Provincial anthem of Pangasinan

English: My Province and Treasure
- Provincial anthem of Pangasinan
- Also known as: Pangasinan Aking Yaman (English: Pangasinan My Treasure); Pangasinan Hymn
- Lyrics: Raul "Insiyong" Tamayo (original Pangasinan lyrics), 2008
- Music: Deneo V. Tamayo, 2008
- Adopted: September 5, 2011

Audio sample
- "Luyag Ko Tan Yaman", performed by the Pangasinan Provincial Chorale: file; help

"Luyag Ko Tan Yaman" (Pangasinan for "My Province and Treasure"), also known by its Filipino title "Pangasinan Aking Yaman" ("Pangasinan My Treasure"), and generally referred to as the Pangasinan Hymn, is the official anthem of the province of Pangasinan in the Philippines.

== History ==
A provincial hymn for Pangasinan was conceptualized during the governorship of Amado Espino Jr., as part of a wider push to promote and reinvigorate the Pangasinan language and the province's cultural heritage.

In 2008, Espino commissioned veteran radio broadcaster and singer Raul "Insiyong" Tamayo, known for his novelty songs, to write the song, which would become Pangasinan's first provincial hymn. Tamayo then wrote Luyag Ko Tan Yaman, which Espino introduced under its Filipino title, "Pangasinan Aking Yaman", when it was performed for the first time at the Pangasinan Provincial Capitol in Lingayen on January 27, 2008. Filipino lyrics for the hymn were also subsequently written.

Three years later on September 5, 2011, the Pangasinan Provincial Board passed Provincial Ordinance No. 154-2011, which officially declared Luyag Ko Tan Yaman as the official hymn of the province. The song was then officially performed for the first time during the launch of the province's "I Love Pangasinan" tourism campaign at the start of Pangasinan's tourism month on September 12, 2011, and later that month the provincial government embarked on a school tour to introduce the song to students throughout Pangasinan.

Aside from promoting and reinvigorating the Pangasinan language and culture of Pangasinan, the adoption of Luyag Ko Tan Yaman was also part of a narrower push on the part of the Pangasinan provincial government to adopt official symbols, including a new provincial flag and seal which were adopted in 2017.

== Lyrics ==
Although Luyag Ko Tan Yaman has lyrics in Pangasinan and Filipino, only the Pangasinan lyrics were given official status by the Provincial Board. Additionally there are no lyrics in Ilocano, which is the predominant language in the province's eastern and western peripheries. Instead, the provincial government has encouraged people living in Ilocano-speaking areas to sing the hymn in Pangasinan, which is primarily spoken in the central part of the province.

Original Pangasinan version
Luyag Ko Tan Yaman (2008)
penned by Raul "Insiyong" Tamayo
Filipino version
Pangasinan Aking Yaman

Sekder ka tan dayew mi,
Pangasinan ya pinabli...
Deen mo tan iyaliguwas,
Piugagep ko lawas.

Diad pusok Pangasinan,
Agka nalinguwanan...
Luyag ko ya niyanakan,
Peteg takan yaman.

Matuwan aliguwas mo natay anengneng la
Pasimbaloy ginmapo la...
Say pankakasakey natay nalilikna,
Lapud panamablid sika

Say dayat mo napnoy dakep tan say yaman,
Sekder na kapalandeyan...
Kareenan tan santing mo Pangasinan
Pablien tan lawas bantayan.

Lawas takan intanduro Pangasinan,
Aroen ka tan bayuboan...
Panangampupon ya walan abangonan,
Ikikinon kod siopa man...
Pangasinan luyag mi tan yaman.

Sandigan ka at dangal
Lalawigan kong Mahal
Sa diwa ko'y tanging hangad
Tatag mo't pag-unlad

Pangasinan sa aking puso
Hindi mapaparam
Paglingap mong kinagisnan
Aking tanging yaman

Ang pag-unlad ngayo'y nababanaag na
Sa diwang nagkakaisa
Ang simoy ng hangin ay may dalang saya
Ang pagbabago ng diwa

Katatagan iyong inaasam-asam
Sumapit na, Pangasinan
Baybayin mong pintuan ng kalayaan
Larawan ng kaunlaran

Ang yamang taglay ng iyong karagatan
Tatag ng iyong kabundukan
Kapayapaan at ganda ng iyong parang
Pangasinan, iingatan
Pangasinan na aking yaman.

Tamayo notes that the lyrics of the song reflects his pride at being Pangasinense, which he says all residents of Pangasinan should feel. At its first performance in 2008, Espino remarked that the song will help remind Pangasinenses of their history and heritage, likewise hoping that it stirs love for the province.

The lyrics have also been interpreted as helping to instill a sense of pride in the best qualities of Pangasinan.
