= La Union Hymn =

Provincial anthem of La Union

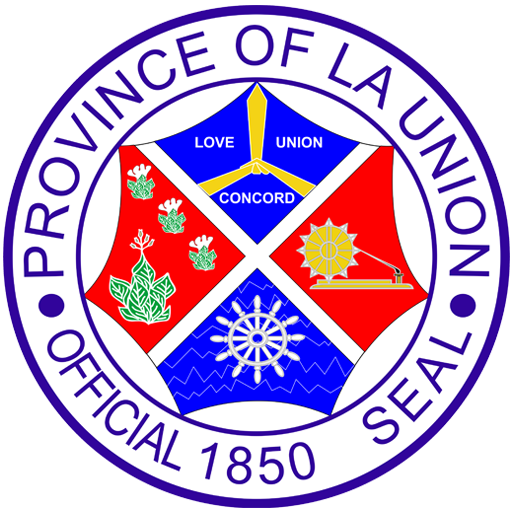
- Provincial anthem of La Union
- Lyrics: Primitivo L. Acosta Jr., 1999
- Music: Primitivo L. Acosta Jr., 1999
- Adopted: 1999

The "La Union Hymn" is the official anthem of the province of La Union in the Philippines.

== History ==
The La Union Hymn was written and composed by Primitivo L. Acosta Jr.

The La Union Provincial Board officially adopted the song in 1999 with the passage of Ordinance No. 007-99. Four years later, it enacted revised lyrics with the passage of Ordinance No. 009–2003 on November 27, 2003.

== Lyrics ==
Although currently the La Union Hymn only has official lyrics in English, on September 26, 2012 the Sangguniang Panlalawigan of La Union passed Ordinance No. 026-2012, making Ilocano an official language of the province. The ordinance includes provisions for singing the song in Ilocano – should lyrics in the language be adopted – no less than twice a year.

La Union Hymn
penned by Primitivo L. Acosta Jr.

Where is the place where one could find refuge,
through wooded hills and verdant rolling fields?
Where is that place with bubbling brooks and rivers?
Where is that place?
Oh where is that place?

Where can one find birds singing all the day?
Where do the waves roll on so silvery?
Where does the sunset spread its golden beauty?
Where is that place?
La Union my beloved!

Refrain:
God bless the people
of fair La Union!
Keep us from harm
And fill our hearts with love

Let no one seek
to break the cord that binds us!
𝄆 God bless La Union
Our own home! 𝄇

In 2016, Francisco Ortega III, at the time representing the Abono Partylist in the House of Representatives, explained that the song's lyrics should serve as a reminder of the province's commitment to unity and progress, and that it should continue aspiring to these ideals as it strives towards greatness.
