= State Anthem of Mordovia =

Shumbrat, Mordoviya!
English: Hail, Mordovia!
- Шумбрат, Мордовия!
- Coat of arms of Mordovia
- Regional anthem of Mordovia
- Lyrics: Sergey Vasilyevich Kinyakin
- Music: Nina Vasilyevna Koshelieva

Audio sample
- Official orchestral and choral vocal recording in E major: file; help

Official orchestral recording in D major

The State Anthem of the Republic of Mordovia, also known as "Hail, Mordovia!" (Шумбрат, Мордовия! [ˈʂumbrət | mɐrˈdovʲɪjə]), is one of the state symbols of the Republic of Mordovia, a federal subject of Russia.

It was composed by Nina Vasilyevna Koshelieva (ru), with lyrics by Sergey Vasilyevich Kinyakin (ru). The anthem has lyrics in all three of the republic's official languages: Moksha, Erzya and Russian. The refrains of the anthem are a mixture between Moksha and Erzya.

== Lyrics ==
=== Mordvin and Russian original ===
Original text

I
Ши валда, Мордовия, седистот сай,
Ши валда, Мордовия, сельмосот палы, юрнай,
Россиять мяшться мокшень сияста сюлгам,
Россиять карксэземса эрзянь зырняста пулай.

Припев:
Шумбрат! Шумбрат, Мордовия!
Гайняк! Гайняк, Мордовия!
Кельгома краеньке — най панжи маеньке,
Мокшэрзянь шачема-касома край!

Шумбрат! Шумбрат, Мордовия!
Морак! Морак, Мордовия!
Павазу эряфсь катк тонь эрь кудозт сувай!
Ульхть шумбра, ульхть шумбра,
Кода сонць Сияжарсь, ульхть шумбра!

II
Тон ютыть, Мордовия, стака кить-янт,
Тон молить, Мордовия, витьстэ, верьга кандыть прят.
Вий макснесть келей Мокшась ды бойка Сурась,
Секс течис тон седейс ды оймес — прок ванькс лисьмапрят.

Припев

III
Ты трудной дорогой, Мордовия, шла,
России держалась и голову гордо несла.
Давали силы вольные Мокша, Сура,
Ты духом была и осталась сильна и добра.

Припев

Transliterated text

I
Shi valda, Mordoviya, sedistot say,
Shi valda, Mordoviya, sel'mosot paly, yurnay,
Rossiyat' myasht'sya mokshen' siyasta syulgam,
Rossiyat' karksėzemsa erzyan' zyrnyasta pulay.

Pripev:
Shumbrat! Shumbrat, Mordoviya!
Gaynyak! Gaynyak, Mordoviya!
Kel'goma krayen'ke - nay panzhi mayen'ke,
Mokshėrzyan' shachema-kasoma kray!

Shumbrat! Shumbrat, Mordoviya!
Morak! Morak, Mordoviya!
Pavazu eryafs' katk ton' er' kudozt suvay!
Ul'kht' shumbra, ul'kht' shumbra,
Koda sonts' Siyazhars', ul'kht' shumbra!

II
Ton jutit', Mordoviya, staka kit'-yant,
Ton molit', Mordoviya, vit'stė, ver'ga kandyt' pryat.
Viy maksnest' keley Mokshas' dy boyka Suras',
Sex techis ton sedeys dy oymes - prok van'ks lis'mapryat.

Pripev

III
Ty trudnoy dorogoy, Mordoviya, shla,
Rossii derzhalas' i golovu gordo nesla.
Davali sily vol'nyye Moksha, Sura,
Ty dukhom byla i ostalas' sil'na i dobra.

Pripev

IPA transcription (Note: See: File:Regional anthem of Mordovia vocal.oga, Help:IPA, Moksha language § Phonology and Moksha language § Writing system; File:Regional anthem of Mordovia vocal.oga, Help:IPA/Russian and Russian phonology.)

1
[ʂɨ ˈvaɫ.də mɐr.ˈdo.vʲɪ.jə ˈsʲe.dʲɪs.tət saj ‖]
[ʂɨ ˈvaɫ.də mɐr.ˈdo.vʲɪ.jə ˈsʲelʲ.mə.sət ˈpa.ɫɨ jʊr.ˈnaj ‖]
[rɐs.ˈsʲi.jədʲ‿ˈmʲaʂtʲ.sʲə ˈmok.ʂɨnʲ sʲɪ.ˈjas.tə sʲʊɫ.ˈgam |]
[rɐs.ˈsʲi.jətʲ kɐrk.ˈsʲe.zʲɪm.sə ˈer.zʲənʲ zɨr.ˈnʲas.tə pʊ.ˈɫaj ‖]

[prʲɪ.ˈpʲef]
[ˈʂum.brət | ˈʂum.brəd‿mɐr.ˈdo.vʲɪ.jə ‖]
[ˈgaj.nʲək ˈgaj.nʲəg‿mɐr.ˈdo.vʲɪ.jə ‖]
[ˈkʲelʲ.gə.mə ˈkra.jenʲ.kʲə naj ˈpan.ʐɨ ˈma.jenʲ.kʲə ‖]
[ˈmok.ʂɨr.zʲənʲ ˈʂa.t͡ɕɪ.mə.ˌka.sə.mə kraj ‖]

[ˈʂum.brət | ˈʂum.brəd‿mɐr.ˈdo.vʲɪ.jə |]
[ˈmo.rək ˈmo.rəg‿mɐr.ˈdo.vʲɪ.jə ‖]
[ˈpa.və.zʊ ˈe.rʲəfsʲ katk tonʲ erʲ ˈku.dəst sʊ.ˈvaj |]
[ulʲxtʲ ʂʊm.ˈbra ulʲxtʲ ʂʊm.ˈbra |]
[ˈko.də sont͡sʲ sʲɪ.jɐ.ˈʐarsʲ ulʲxtʲ ʂʊm.ˈbra ‖]

2
[ton ˈju.tɨdʲ‿mɐr.ˈdo.vʲɪ.jə ˈsta.kə kʲɪtʲ.ˈjant |]
[ton ˈmo.lʲɪdʲ‿mɐr.ˈdo.vʲɪ.jə ˈvʲitʲ.stʲə vʲɪrʲ.ˈga ˈkan.dɨtʲ prʲat ‖]
[vʲij ˈmaks.nʲɪstʲ ˈkʲe.lʲɪj ˈmok.ʂəzʲ‿dɨ ˈboj.kə sʊ.ˈrasʲ |]
[sʲeks ˈtʲe.t͡ɕɪs ton ˈsʲe.dʲɪjz‿dɨ ˈoj.mʲɪs prog‿vanʲks lʲɪsʲ.mɐ.ˈprʲat ‖]

[prʲɪ.ˈpʲef]

3
[tɨ ˈtrud.nəj dɐ.ˈro.ɡəj mɐr.ˈdo.vʲɪ.jə ʂɫa]
[rɐ.ˈsʲi.ɪ dʲɪr.ˈʐa.ɫəsʲ i ˈɡo.ɫə.vʊ ˈɡor.də nʲɪs.ˈɫa]
[dɐ.ˈva.lʲɪ ˈsʲi.ɫɨ ˈvolʲ.nɨ.je ˈmok.ʂə sʊ.ˈra]
[tɨ ˈdu.xəm bɨ.ˈɫa i ɐ.ˈsta.ɫəsʲ sʲɪlʲ.ˈna i dɐ.ˈbra]

[prʲɪ.ˈpʲef]

=== English translation ===
I
Bright day, Mordovia! From the bottom of thy heart,
Bright day, Mordovia! In thine eyes shineth light.
Glittering across Russia the star of Moksha,
Surrounding Russia the dawn of Erzya.

Chorus:
Hail! Hail, Mordovia!
Ring! Ring, Mordovia!
Land beloved! Thy flowering spring,
Land beloved of Moksha-Erzya!

Hail! Hail, Mordovia!
Sing! Sing, Mordovia!
May joyous life come into thy hearth!
Peace be upon thee, Mordovia!
Strong may thou be as the sun blazeth!

II
Thou, Mordovia, cross’d a path grim and hard,
Thou, Mordovia, stoodest erect and proud,
Vast Moksha and swift Sura gave thee strength,
Thy heart and soul still like a pure spring.

Chorus

III
Thou, Mordovia, cross’d a path long and hard,
Thou wert with Russia always and proud,
The free Moksha and Sura gave thee strength,
Thy soul and heart remain strong.

Chorus

== See also ==
- Music of Mordovia
