= Anthem of Saint Petersburg =

Anthem of a Russian federal city

Gimn Sankt-Peterburga
English: Anthem of Saint Petersburg
- Гимн Санкт-Петербурга
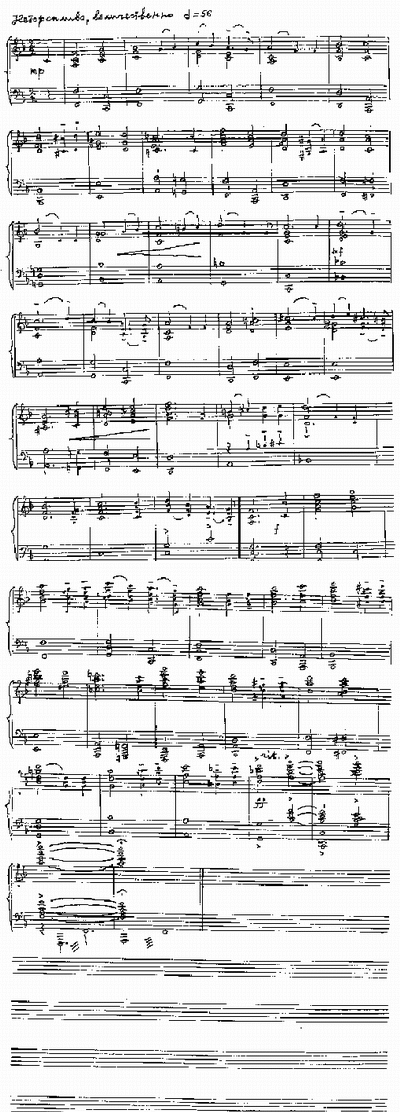
- Sheet music
- Lyrics: Oleg Chuprov, 2002
- Music: Reinhold Glière, 1949
- Adopted: 13 May 2003

Audio sample
- Official orchestral and choral vocal recording: file; help

The Anthem of Saint Petersburg (Russian: Гимн Санкт-Петербурга, romanized: Gimn Sankt-Peterburga) is the municipal anthem of the Russian federal city of Saint Petersburg since 2003. The music was composed in 1949 by Reinhold Glière, and the lyrics were written by poet Oleg Chuprov in 2002.

The anthem was fully recognized on 13 May 2002, when the initial version approved by the Legislative Assembly of Saint Petersburg on 23 April, edited and then signed into law by the Governor of Saint Petersburg.

== Lyrics ==
Russian (Cyrillic)

Державный град, возвышайся над Невою,
Как дивный храм, ты сердцам открыт!
Сияй в веках красотой живою,
Дыханье твое Медный всадник хранит.

Несокрушим – ты смог в года лихие
Преодолеть все бури и ветра!
С морской душой,
Бессмертен, как Россия,
Плыви, фрегат, под парусом Петра!

Санкт-Петербург, оставайся вечно молод!
Грядущий день озарен тобой.
Так расцветай, наш прекрасный город!
Высокая честь – жить единой судьбой!

Russian Latin alphabet

Derzhavnyy grad, vozvyshaysya nad Nevoyu,
Kak divnyy khram, ty serdtsam otkryt!
Siyay v vekakh krasotoy zhivoyu,
Dykhanye tvoye Mednyy vsadnik khranit.

Nesokrushim — ty smog v goda likhiye
Preodolet' vse buri i vetra!
S morskoy dushoy,
Bessmerten kak Rossiya,
Plyvi, fregat, pod parusom Petra!

Sankt-Peterburg, ostavaysya vechno molod!
Gryadushchiy den' ozaren toboy.
Tak rastsvetay, nash prekrasnyy gorod!
Vysokaya chest' — zhit' yedinoy sud'boy!

English translation

Sovereign city, tower over the Neva,
Like a wondrous temple, you are open to hearts!
Shine with living beauty for centuries,
The Bronze Horseman keeps your breath.

Indestructible, you could in turbulent years
Overcome all storms and winds!
With a soul of the sea,
Immortal like Russia,
Sail, frigate, under the sail of Peter!

Saint Petersburg, stay forever young!
The day to come is illuminated by you.
So blossom, our beloved city!
It is a high honor to live a common destiny!

== History ==
- In honor of the 250th anniversary of Saint Petersburg, Russian bard Alexander Gorodnitsky wrote an anthem along music by Soviet composer Reinhold Glière from the ballet Bronze Horseman, which was based on a poem by Alexander Pushkin.
- Until 2003 the anthem was reportedly performed at official events without lyrics.
- In 2002 the Legislative Assembly launched a competition for the lyrics of the new city anthem. On 24 October 2002, the jury (made out of Honorary Citizens of Saint Petersburg – Zhores Alferov, Alisa Freindlich, Kirill Lavrov and others), declared Oleg Chuprov the winner.
- In December the winning proposal was approved by a Administration committee, and a law on approving the anthem passed in the city legislature on 23 April 2003. The governor of the city signed the law on 13 May 2003.
- The anthem is currently regulated by Paragraph 6, Clause 4 of the Charter of Saint Petersburg.

== See also ==
- Coat of arms of Saint Petersburg
- Flag of Saint Petersburg
