= Anthem of Yamalo-Nenets Autonomous Okrug =

Anthem of a Russian federal subject

Gimn Yamalo-Nenetskogo avtonomnogo okruga
English: Anthem of the Yamalo-Nenets autonomous okrug
- Гимн Ямало-Ненецкого автономного округа
- Coat of arms of Yamalo-Nenets Autonomous Okrug
- Regional anthem of Yamalo-Nenets Autonomous Okrug
- Lyrics: Lyudmila Khodunova, 2010
- Music: Yuri Yunkerov, 2010
- Adopted: 17 November 2010

Audio sample
- Anthem of Yamalo-Nenets Autonomous Okrug: file; help

Instrumental anthem of Yamalo-Nenets Autonomous Okrug

The Anthem of the Yamalo-Nenets Autonomous Okrug (Russian: Гимн Ямало-Ненецкого автономного округа, romanized: Gimn Yamalo-Nenetskogo avtonomnogo okruga) is one of the national symbols of Yamalo-Nenets Autonomous Okrug, a federal subject of Russia, along with its flag and coat of arms. The Russian lyrics of the anthem were written by Lyudmila Khodunova, and the anthem's music was composed by Yuri Yunkerov, both in 2010. It was officially adopted on 17 November 2010.

== Lyrics ==
Russian original

I
Среди седых широт полярных,
Где вьюги правят вечный бал,
Героем былей легендарных
Встаёт заснеженный Ямал!

Припев:
Суровый край! Оплот Державы!
Ты с каждым годом всё сильней.
Ямал — надёжный сын и слава
И гордость Родины моей!

II
Девиз твой — всё для человека!
И, к новым подвигам готов,
Решаешь ты задачи века,
Храня традиции отцов!

Припев

III
Земля открытий и дерзанья!
Бескрайней тундры властный зов,
Где спорят с северным сияньем
Огни ямальских городов!

Припев

Transliteration

I
Sredi sedykh shirot polyarnykh,
Gde v'yugi pravyat vechnyy bal,
Geroyem byley legendarnykh
Vstayot zasnezhennyy Yamal!

Pripev:
Surovyy kray! Oplot Derzhavy!
Ty s kazhdym godom vsyo sil'ney.
Yamal — sokrovishche i slava
I gordost' Rodiny moyey!

II
Deviz tvoy — vsyo dlya cheloveka!
I, k novym podvigam gotov,
Reshajesh' ty zadachi veka,
Khranya traditsii ottsov!

Pripev

III
Zemlya otkrytiy i derzan'ja!
Beskrayney tundry vlastnyy zov,
Gde sporyat s severnym siyan'yem
Ogni yamal'skikh gorodov!

Pripev

English translation

I
Amongst the grey polar latitudes,
Where snowstorms hold eternal ball, (Note: As in "dance party")
As a hero of legendary myths,
Snowy Yamal rises!

Chorus:
Stoic (Note: Also translated as "severe") land! Stronghold of the State!
You are stronger every year.
Yamal is a reliable son and glory,
And pride of my Motherland (Note: Also translated as "homeland")!

II
Your motto is "all for the human"!
And being prepared for new deeds,
You solve tasks of the century,
Preserving the fathers' traditions!

Chorus

III
The land of discoveries and darings!
Imperious call of the endless tundra,
Where the lights of Yamal cities
Argue with the northern lights!

Chorus
