= Himno di Kòrsou =

National anthem of Curaçao

English: Anthem of Curaçao
- National anthem of Curaçao
- Lyrics: Friar Radulphus, 1898; Guillermo Rosario, Mae Henriquez, Enrique Muller and Betty Doran, 1978
- Music: Friar Candidus Nouwens, Errol Colina
- Adopted: July 26, 1978

Audio sample
- The national anthem of Curaçao played by a symphony orchestra in B-flat major.: file; help

The Anthem of Curaçao (Papiamento: Himno di Kòrsou) is the national anthem of Curaçao. Officially adopted on 26 July 1978, it consists of four verses, although only the first and last are commonly sung. Its theme is best summed up by the first stanza, praising the grandeur of Curaçao, as small as the island may be.

== History ==
The lyrics were first written by a friar of Dutch origin, Friar Radulphus, in celebration of the coronation of Queen Wilhelmina in 1898. The song was known as "Den Tur Nashon Nos Patria Ta Poko Konosí" ("In Every Nation Our Fatherland Is Little Known"). During the celebrations, the pupils of a local elementary school, the St. Jozefschool, sang this to the melody of the Tyrolean hymn "Andreas-Hofer-lied".

It wasn't until the 1930s when Friar Candidus Nouwens composed the melody to which the anthem is sung today. For many years since, the song was sung on the Dutch national holiday Koninginnedag (or Queen's Day), and on other official occasions. In 1978, the government commissioned a group to rewrite the lyrics before it would be adopted as the official anthem of Curaçao on 26 July. The assumed belittlement of the Island by the title and the first phrase was one of the motives for the adaptation ordered by the insular government. The website of the insular government of Curaçao cites Guillermo Rosario, Mae Henriquez, Enrique Muller and Betty Doran as the writers of the anthem's lyrics.

== Performance ==
On June 18, 2003, the insular government of Curaçao defined regulations on the official use of the anthem. Typically, only the first and last verses are sung. The only occasions where all four are officially sung are:

- When the administrator, a deputy or a member of the insular government starts their tenure,
- At meetings organised by the insular government to celebrate an official holiday or an official commemoration of an event and,
- When raising the flag at official events organised for the insular government.

As for all television and radio broadcasts, the anthem is played at midnight on New Year's and every day at the beginning and end of transmission. Various radio stations on the island play the anthem at noon as well. The anthem may only be sung in Papiamentu.

== Lyrics ==
Typically, only the first and last verses are sung.

Papiamentu original

I
Lantá nos bos ban kanta
grandesa di Kòrsou;
Kòrsou, isla chikitu,
baranka den laman!

Kòrsou, nos ta stima bo
ariba tur nashon.
Bo gloria nos ta kanta
di henter nos kurason.

II
Nos pueblo tin su lucha,
ma semper nos tin fe
di logra den tur tempu
viktoria ku trabou!

Ban duna di nos parti
p'e isla prosperá.
Laga nos uni forsa
p'asina triumfá.

III
Nos patria nos ta demonstrá
onor i lealdat,
meskos na e bandera
union di nos nashon.

Nos bida lo ta poko
pa duna nos pais,
luchando uní pa libertat,
amor i komprenshon.

IV
I ora nos ta leu fo'i kas
nos tur ta rekordá
Kòrsou, su solo i playanan,
orguyo di nos tur.

Laga nos gloria Kreador
tur tempu i sin fin,
k'El a hasi nos digno
di ta yu di Kòrsou!

IPA transcription (Note: See Help:IPA, Papiamento § Phonology and Papiamento orthography.)

1
[lan.ta nos bos ban kan.ta]
[gran.de.sa di kɔr.sɔu̯]
[kɔr.sɔu̯ is.la t͡ʃi.ki.tu]
[ba.raŋ.ka den la.man]

[kɔr.sɔu̯ nos ta sti.ma bo]
[a.ri.ba tur na.ʃon]
[bo glo.rja nos ta kan.ta]
[di(‿)hen.ter nos ku.ra.son]

2
[nos pwe.blo tin su lu.t͡ʃa]
[ma sɛm.pər nos tin fe]
[di log.ra den tur tem.pu]
[vik.to.rja ku tra.bɔu̯]

[ban duna di nos par.ti]
[pe is.la pros.pe.ra]
[la.ga nos u.ni for.sa]
[pa.si.na tri.um.fa]

3
[nos pa.trja nos ta de.mon.stra]
[o.nor i le.al.dat]
[mes.kos na e ban.de.ra]
[u.njon di nos na.ʃon]

[nos bi.da lo ta po.ko]
[pa du.na nos pa.is]
[lu.t͡ʃan.do‿u.ni pa li.ber.tat]
[a.mor i kom.pren.ʃon]

4
[i o.ra nos ta leu̯ foi̯ kas]
[nos tur ta re.kɔr.da]
[kɔr.sɔu̯ su so.lo‿i pla.ja.nan]
[or.gu.jo di nos tur]

[la.ga nos glo.rja kre.a.dor]
[tur tem.pu i sin fin]
[kel a ha.si nos dig.no]
[di ta yu di kɔr.sɔu̯]

English translation (unofficial)

I
Let's raise our voice and sing
the grandeur of Curaçao;
Curaçao, small island,
a boulder in the sea!

Curaçao, we love you
above all nations.
Your glory we sing
with all our hearts.

II
Our people have their struggle
but we always have our faith
to accomplish always
victory through labour!

Let us do our part
for the island's prosperity.
Let us unite forces
so we can triumph.

III
(To) Our fatherland we demonstrate
honour and loyalty,
as to the flag
the union of our nation.

Our lives would be little
to give for our country,
fighting united for liberty,
love and understanding.

IV
And when we are far from home
we all recall
Curaçao, its sun and beaches
the pride of us all.

Let us praise our Creator
always and forever,
for He has made us worthy
to be born of Curaçao! (Note: The phrase "yu di Kòrsou" literally means "child of Curaçao" but is the demonym for someone born on Curaçao in Papiamentu.)

Dutch translation (unofficial)

I
Laat ons onze stem verheffen en zing
de grootsheid van Curaçao;
Curaçao, klein eiland
een rots in de zee!

Curaçao, wij houden van u
boven alle naties.
Uw glorie zingen wij
met heel ons hart.

II
Ons volk heeft zijn strijd
maar wij geloven nog altijd
elke keer te kunnen overwinnen
door middel van arbeid!

Laat ons allemaal bieden
voor het voorspoed van het eiland.
Laat ons samen optreden
zodat wij kunnen triomferen.

III
(Aan) Ons vaderland tonen wij
eer en trouw,
net als aan de vlag
de unie van onze natie.

Onze leven zouden weinig zijn
om te geven voor ons land,
samen vechtend voor vrijheid,
liefde en begrip.

IV
En wanneer wij ver van huis zijn
denken we allemaal terug aan
Curaçao, zijn zon en stranden,
de trots van ons ieder.

Laat ons onze Schepper loven
altijd en voorgoed,
omdat Hij ons waardig heeft gemaakt
een kind van Curaçao te zijn!

== Bibliography ==
- "Nos Himno" [About Anthem] (in Papiamento). gobiernu.cw. Archived from the original on 2014-04-09.
