= State Anthem of Mari El =

Anthem of a Russian federal subject

Государственный гимн Республики Марий Эл Марий Эл Республик чапмурыжо Мары Эл Республик чапмурыжо
English: State Anthem of the Republic of Mari El
- Regional anthem of Mari El
- Lyrics: Yuri Toyvars-Yevdokimov (Mari lyrics); Vladimir Panov (Russian lyrics)
- Music: Davlet Islamov
- Adopted: 9 June 1992

Official a cappella choral vocal recording (trilingual version)
First Meadow Mari verse and chorus; second Hill Mari verse and chorus; second Russian verse and chorus

The State Anthem of the Republic of Mari El (Note: Russian: Государственный гимн Республики Марий Эл, romanized: Gosudarstvennyj gimn Respubliki Marij El; Meadow Mari: Марий Эл Республик чапмурыжо, romanized: Marij El Respublik tšapmurõžo; Hill Mari: Мары Эл Республик чапмурыжо, romanized: Mary El Respublik čapmuryžo) is the regional anthem of Mari El, a federal subject of Russia. The anthem has lyrics in three languages: the two versions of Mari, and Russian. The melody was composed by Yuri Toyvars-Yevdokimov, the lyrics by Davlet Islamov. The Russian lyrics were written by Vladimir Panov.

== History ==
The anthem was approved by the Supreme Council of the Mari SSR on 9 July 1992. The anthem was written by professional composer and member of the Union of Russian Composers Yuri Evdokimov to the words of poet and member of the Union of Writers of Russia Davlet Islamov. An original second verse was excluded from the official lyrics. The Russian lyrics were written by Vladimir Panov and the Hill Mari lyrics by Ivan Gorny.

The description and procedure for using the anthem of the Republic of Mari El is not regulated by law. The Regulations on the Anthem are in force, approved by the Decree of the Supreme Council of the Mari SSR dated 07/09/1992 No. 313-III, and the text of the anthem is contained in the appendix to this Decree.

In the years that followed, there were several attempts to change the anthem.

In January 2000, the Government of the Republic of Mari El announced a competition for the creation of a new anthem. At the first stage, it was proposed to consider recognised works of Mari composers, as well as works by contemporary composers written specifically for the competition. At the second stage, it was proposed to choose the text of the anthem. The resolution stated that the competition was held in connection with the appeal of the public of the republic about the need to change the existing anthem.

In February 2007, a second competition was announced. Unlike the previous competition, in the first round it was allowed to present music with text in one of the state languages of the Republic of Mari El (creative collaboration between composer and poet was encouraged). It was reported that eight applications from various authors were submitted for the first stage of the competition. However, due to a lack of worthy contestants, the competition was declared invalid, and the Government announced a new competition with extended deadlines for the stages. It was reported that this time 11 applications were submitted. The results were supposed to be announced on 25 January 2008, but this did not happen.

== Protocol ==
According to the Regulations on the National Anthem of the Republic of Mari El, the anthem can be performed in any vocal or instrumental version, in strict accordance with the approved text and musical version.

The anthem of the Republic of Mari El is performed at official ceremonies, at the raising of the flag of the Republic of Mari El, at the opening and closing of sessions of the State Assembly of the Republic of Mari El and at meetings and departures of heads of state and heads of governments of foreign countries visiting the Republic of Mari El on official visits.

The anthem can also be performed at solemn events held by state authorities and local self-government bodies of the Republic of Mari El, as well as other organisations, at the opening and closing of sessions of representative authorities of the municipalities of the republic, at the opening of monuments and the presentation of awards established by the authorities of the Republic of Mari El.

During public performance of the State Anthem of the Republic of Mari El, those present listen to the Anthem while standing, and men take off their headdresses or put their hand to it.

In television broadcasts of the Mari El State TV and Radio Broadcasting Campaign, the anthem is performed on the days of national holidays; in radio broadcasts – daily at the beginning of the programme.

The anthem can be performed in an orchestral, choral, orchestral-choral or other vocal and instrumental performance.

== Lyrics ==
Meadow Mari (Cyrillic)

I
Марий Эл тый улат
Авай гай кажнылан.
Шке сурт гай тый кӱлат
Чыла мӱндыр марийлан.

Припев:
Ме таче, чон пуэн,
Марий мландым моктена.
Вийнам иктыш чумырен,
Пиалан илышым чоҥена.

II
Сакла чот кугешнен
Шке сынжым калыкна.
Йомартле улмыж ден
Эре тудо чаплана.

Припев

Meadow Mari (Latin)

I
Marii El tõi ulat
Avai gai kažnõlan.
Ške surt gai tõi külat
Tšõla mündõr mariilan.

Pripev:
Me tatše, tšon puen,
Marii mlandõm moktena.
Viinam iktõš tšumõren,
Pialan ilõšõm tšongena.

II
Sakla tšot kugešnen
Ške sõnžõm kalõkna.
Jomartle ulmõž den
Ere tudo tšaplana.

Pripev

Hill Mari (Cyrillic)

I
Марий Эл, ӓвӓ гань
Ылат каждыйланок.
Келӓт шачмы пӧрт гань
Цилӓ мӹндӹр йыхланок.

Припев:
Кымылын ӹвӹртӓл,
Мары млӓндӹм мактенӓ.
Силам иктӹш цымырал,
Соты цӓшнӓм ӹшкеок чангенӓ.

II
Лӱктӓ кӱш лӹмжӹмӓт
Мары халык соок.
Веселӓжӹ, сӹржӓт
Лӹмлештӓлтеш йӹрвӓшок.

Припев

Hill Mari (Latin)

I
Marii El, ävä gaň
Ylat každyilanok.
Kelät šačmy pört gaň
Cilä mÿndÿr jyhlanok.

Pripev:
Kymylyn ÿvÿrtäl,
Mary mländÿm maktenä.
Silam iktÿš cymyral,
Soty cäšnäm ÿškeok čangenä.

II
Lüktä küš lÿmžÿmät
Mary halyk sook.
Veseläžÿ, sÿržät
Lÿmleštälteš jÿrväšok.

Pripev

Russian (Cyrillic)

I
Марий Эл, ты — как мать
Для каждого в судьбе.
Где бы ни был — вспоминать
Твой сын будет о тебе.

Припев:
Славься, наш край родной,
Цвети в счастье и в труде.
Гордимся всегда тобой
И поём, Марий Эл, о тебе!

II
Свою честь сохранит
Народ наш на века,
И дружба как гранит
Всегда с братьями крепка.

Припев

Russian (Latin)

I
Marij El, ty — kak matj
Dlja každogo v sudjbe.
Gde by ni byl — vspominatj
Tvoj syn budet o tebe.

Pripev:
Slavjsja, naš kraj rodnoj
Cveti v sčastje i v trude.
Gordimsja vsegda toboj
I pojom, Marij El, o tebe!

II
Svoju čestj sohranit
Narod naš na veka,
I družba kak granit
Vsegda s bratiami krepka.

Pripev

English translation (from Russian)

I
Mari El, you're like a mother
For everyone in their fate.
Wherever he may be,
Your son will remember you.

Chorus:
Be glorious, our native land,
Flourish in happiness and labour.
We are always proud of you
And we sing, Mari El, about you!

II
Our people will preserve
Their honour for centuries,
And its friendship, like granite,
Is forever strong with its brothers.

Chorus
