= Himno a Chiapas =

State anthem of Chiapas

English: Anthem to Chiapas
- State anthem of Chiapas
- Also known as: Himno Chiapaneco (English: Chiapanecan Anthem)
- Lyrics: José Emilio Grajales, 1913
- Music: Miguel Lara Vasallo, 1913
- Adopted: December 8, 1913

The Anthem to Chiapas (Spanish: Himno a Chiapas) is the name of the anthem of the Mexican state of Chiapas. Was officially adopted on December 8, 1913. The lyrics of the state anthem were composed by José Emilio Grajales and the music composed by Miguel Lara Vasallo.

On the proposal of General Bernardo A. Z. Palafox, interim Governor of the State of Chiapas and Chairman of the Organising Board of Guadalupe Fair in Tuxtla Gutierrez, was included in the program of celebrations of the Virgen de Guadalupe the "Union Day of Chiapas" which included a special civic and literary program for each of the Departments in which the state was divided politically, in order to unify after the terrible events between the cities of San Cristobal de las Casas and Tuxtla Gutiérrez by dispute over the seat of the Powers of the State in 1911. In the same program was considered the call for a contest of creation of the Anthem to Chiapas, in order to make a call for peace and unity between the people of Chiapas.

In mid October 1913, was issued the call for the contest of words and music of the Anthem to Chiapas, on 20 November were completed to receive the proposals and the 25th was the winner, unanimously, the "Anthem to Chiapas".

== Lyrics ==
Coro

¡Compatriotas, que Chiapas levante una oliva de paz inmortal,
y marchando con paso gigante a la gloria camine triunfal!

Chorus

Countrymen, may Chiapas raise an olive of immortal peace,
and marching with giant steps to the glory and walk triumphant!

Estrofa I

Cesen ya de la angustia y las penas
los momentos de triste sufrir;
que retomen las horas serenas
que prometen feliz porvenir.
Que se olvide la odiosa venganza;
que termine por siempre el rencor;
que una sea nuestra hermosa esperanza
y uno sólo también nuestro amor.

Stanza I

Cease now from the anguish and pain,
the moments of sad suffering;
let return the serene hours
that promise a happy future.
May the horrible vengeance be forgotten,
may rancor end forever;
May our beautiful hope be one
and one only also our love.

Coro

Chorus

Estrofa II

Contemplad esos campos desiertos
que antes fueron florido vergel.
Están tristes, y mudos, y yertos,
arrasados por lucha cruel.
No la sangre fecunda la tierra,
ni al hermano es glorioso matar.
Si es horrible entre extraños la guerra,
a la patria es infame acabar.

Stanza II

Contemplate those deserted fields
that earlier were flowering gardens.
They are sad, and mute, and stiff,
devastated by the cruel struggle.
Blood does not fertilize the soil,
nor is it glorious for man to kill.
Yes, war between strangers is horrible,
to the homeland ending is disgraceful.

Coro

Chorus

Estrofa III

Chiapanecos, la paz os reclama,
y el trabajo también y la unión.
Que el amor como fúlgida llama
os inflame el viril corazón.
Vuestro arrojo guardad, quizá un día
una hueste extranjera vendrá.
¿Quién entonces con gran bizarría
de la patria el honor salvará ?

Stanza III

Chiapans, reclaim peace
and also work and unity.
May love like a blazing flame
inflame your virile heart.
Guard your bravery, perhaps someday
a foreign host will come.
Who then dashingly
will save the honor of the homeland?

Coro

Chorus

Estrofa IV

Chiapanecos, unid vuestras manos
y un anhelo tened nada más:
de estimaros cual nobles hermanos
sin pensar en los odios jamás.
No haya un pueblo que sea tenebroso
en la tierra que viónos nacer.
Que de Chiapas el nombre glorioso
con respeto se diga doquier.

Stanza IV

Chiapans, unite your hands
and have one more desire:
to esteem those noble brothers
who never think of hatred.
There is no town that is gloomy
in the land that saw us born.
May the glorious name of Chiapas
be said with respect everywhere.

== See also ==
- Chiapas
