= Imno ning Kapampangan =

Provincial anthem of Pampanga

English: Pampanga Hymn
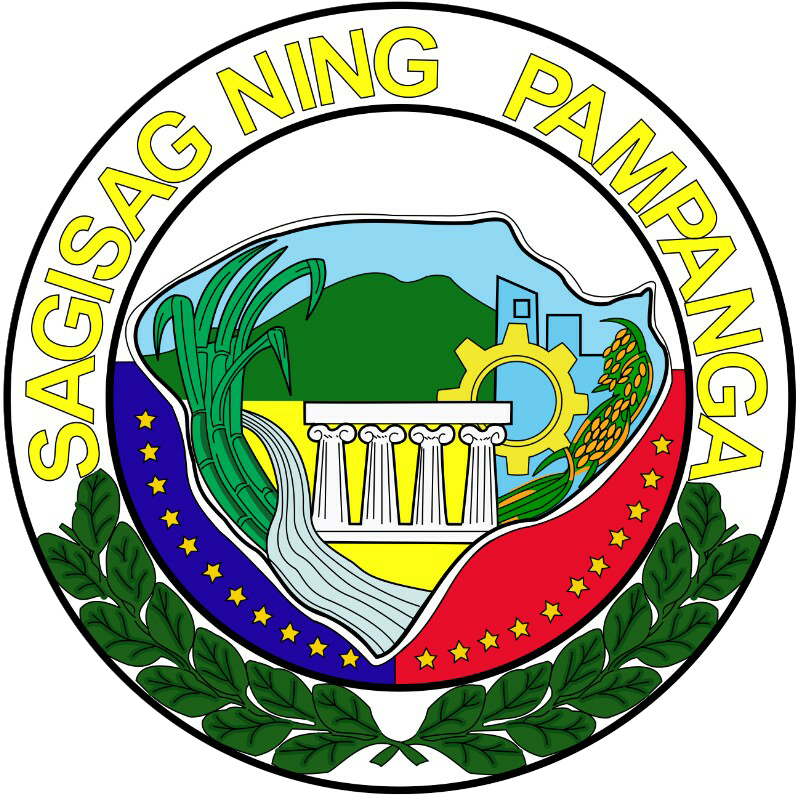
- Provincial anthem of Pampanga
- Also known as: Himno ning Kapampangan
- Lyrics: Vedasto Ocampo, Serafin Lacson and Jose Gallardo, 1982
- Music: Gregorio Canlas, 1982
- Adopted: April 14, 1988

Audio sample
- Imno ning Kapampangan: file; help

"Imno ning Kapampangan" (alternatively spelled "Himno ning Kapampangan"; Kapampangan for "Hymn of Pampanga"), also known as the Pampanga Hymn, is the official anthem of the province of Pampanga in the Philippines.

== History ==
A provincial hymn for Pampanga was commissioned by Governor Estelito Mendoza in connection with the signing of Proclamation No. 2226 by President Ferdinand Marcos, which officially made the Aldo ning Kapampangan (Pampanga Day), the province's foundation day, a non-working holiday.

The lyrics to "Imno ning Kapampangan" were commissioned by Mendoza in early 1982. With Aristedes "Teddy" Panopio, brother of noted Kapampangan yodeler Fred Panopio, serving as his emissary, Mendoza initially commissioned Jose Gallardo and Vedasto Ocampo for the project. Gallardo was a noted poet who held the honorary title of "Ari ning Parnaso" ("King of Parnassus"), bestowed upon the province's premier poet, and Ocampo was the organizer of the Ligligan Pamanyulat Kapampangan, a province-sponsored Kapampangan-language writing contest. Ocampo later suggested to Panopio that they invite another noted Kapampangan poet, Serafin Lacson, to join them.

All three poets initially decided to write separate poems, which they would then compare to one another. After their first writing session, which took thirty minutes, the poems were found to be substantially similar, with only minor differences in meter and rhyme, which led to Lacson and Ocampo asking Gallardo to consolidate all three into one composition. The final lyrics, building largely on Gallardo's version, were completed after three days, after which copies were circulated between Ocampo, Lacson and a few others. At the request of two Carmelite nuns, Ocampo translated the lyrics into English for non-Kapampangan speakers.

After the lyrics were finalized, the provincial government organized a songwriting competition for the hymn's melody, which was won by Monsignor Gregorio Canlas, known in Pampanga for his church hymns. Canlas also arranged the composition, primarily played by a government brass band.

While "Imno ning Kapampangan" was finished in 1982, and the song's ownership passed to the provincial government, it did not become the official song of Pampanga until April 14, 1988, when the Pampanga Provincial Board, led by Vice Governor Cielo Macapagal Salgado, passed Resolution No. 18 which institutionalized the song's legal status.

== Lyrics ==
For several years, the lyrics to "Imno ning Kapampangan" were believed to only have one author, Serafin Lacson. This changed, though, starting in 2010, when researcher Joel Mallari wrote to the Pampanga edition of the SunStar, validating rumoured claims of the song having multiple authors. Three years later, further research uncovered documents proving the song's multiple authorship, as well as Vedasto Ocampo's preference that the authors remain anonymous.

Original Kapampangan version
Imno ning Kapampangan (1982)
penned by Vedasto Ocampo, Serafin Lacson and Jose Gallardo
Tagalog translation
Pampanga Hymn
English translation
Pampanga Hymn
translated by Vedasto Ocampo

Kapampangan, misapuak
King leguan na ning Alaya
Gabun ding pantas at marangal
Sibul ning lugud, karinan ning tepangan;

Batis ning katalaruan
At panandam makabalen
Ligaya mi ing mie payapa
King malugud mung kandungan.

Kapampangan, sale ning leguan
Kapampangan, sandalan ning katimawan
Kilub ding pusu mi atin kang dambana
Luid ka, luid ka! Palsintan ming Kapampangan!

Pampanga, ipinanganak
Ng kagandahan ng Silangan
lupain ng pantas at marangal
Bukal ng pag-ibig, tahanan ng katapangan;

Batis ng katarungan
At pagiging makabayan
Masaya kaming mamuhay nang payapa
Sa iyong mapagmahal na kandungan.

Pampanga, duyan ng kagandahan
Pampanga, sandalan ng kalayaan
Sa loob ng aming mga puso mayroon kang dambana.
Mabuhay, mabuhay! Mahal naming Pampanga!

Pampanga, born
Of the beauty of the East
land of the wise and dignified
Spring of love, abode of bravery;

Fountain of justice
And patriotism
We are happy to live in peace
On your loving lap.

Pampanga, birthplace of beauty
Pampanga, backrest of liberty
Within our hearts you have an altar.
Long live, long live! Our beloved Pampanga!

The lyrics, deliberately written with allegorical language and a limit of 12 lines, have been interpreted as a strong statement of Kapampangans' love for their province, with the music evoking a sense of pride.

== Performance ==
Singing "Imno ning Kapampangan" is mandatory during official events in the province of Pampanga. In addition to its performance at official functions, the song has since been included in anthologies of Kapampangan traditional music, released by various Kapampangan musical artists.
