= Himno de Yucatán =

English: Anthem of Yucatán
- State anthem of Yucatán
- Also known as: Himno Patriótico Yucateco (English: Yucatecan Patriotic Anthem)
- Lyrics: Manuel Palomeque, 1867
- Music: Jacinto Cuevas, 1867
- Adopted: September 15, 1867

The Anthem of Yucatán (Spanish: Himno de Yucatán) was officially adopted on September 15, 1867. The lyrics of the state anthem were composed by Manuel Palomeque and the music composed by Jacinto Cuevas. The Anthem of Yucatán was the first state anthem in Mexico (the second was the state of Veracruz). During almost all the 20th century, the anthem was sung in schools.

On mid-2000, after many years of not being heard at an official ceremony, the Anthem of Yucatán was heard in the fifth governance report of then Governor Víctor Cervera Pacheco. Some media called it a political campaign of the then governor against then President Vicente Fox Quesada.

Similarly, there was a resurgence of the Flag of the Republic of Yucatán, which made its appearance in several places and items such as stickers (attached to motor vehicles and homes), cups, mugs, clothing and caps. Also by order of the Ministry of Public Education in Yucatán the anthem began to be sung again in schools. Currently, the flag of Yucatán still appears in public acts but has not been officialized.

== Lyrics ==
Short version:

Estrofa I:

Al grito de guerra despierta el valor
y el aire se inunda con bélico son.
Haced compatriotas que truene el cañón,
lloviendo metralla sobre el invasor.

Stanza I:

At the battle cry awakens the value
and the air is flooded with war sound.
Make compatriots that cannon roar,
raining bullets on the invader.

Estrofa II:

El cinco de mayo, nos preste su sol
que eclipsa la estrella de Luis Napoleón.
El mundo nos mira, con admiración
y a México envidia su claro blasón.

Stanza II:

The May 5, lend us its sun
which overshadowing the star of Louis Napoleon.
The world is watching us, with admiration
and to Mexico envy its clear coat of arms.

Estrofa III:

Vino el águila esclava de Europa
sancionando la infamia con balas
y regresa arrastrando las alas
con escarnio y vergüenza a la vez.

Stanza III:

Came the eagle slave from Europe
sanctioning the infamy with bullets
and returns dragging the wings
with scorn and shame at a time.

Estrofa IV:

El altivo cóndor del Anáhuac
le dejó los palacios y reales
desafióla en los rudos nopales
y postróla humillada a sus pies.

Stanza IV:

The proud condor of Anahuac
left to it the palaces and money
challenged it in the rude cactus
and it fell humbled at his feet.

This anthem refers to the victory of the Republic over the Empire imposed after the Second French intervention in Mexico and the execution of Maximiliano of Habsburgo in Cerro de las Campanas in the state of Querétaro.

== See also ==
- Second Mexican Empire
- Maximilian I of Mexico
- French intervention in Mexico
- Republic of Yucatán
