= Siebenbürgenlied =

1846 anthem for the Transylvanian Saxons

English: Transylvania song
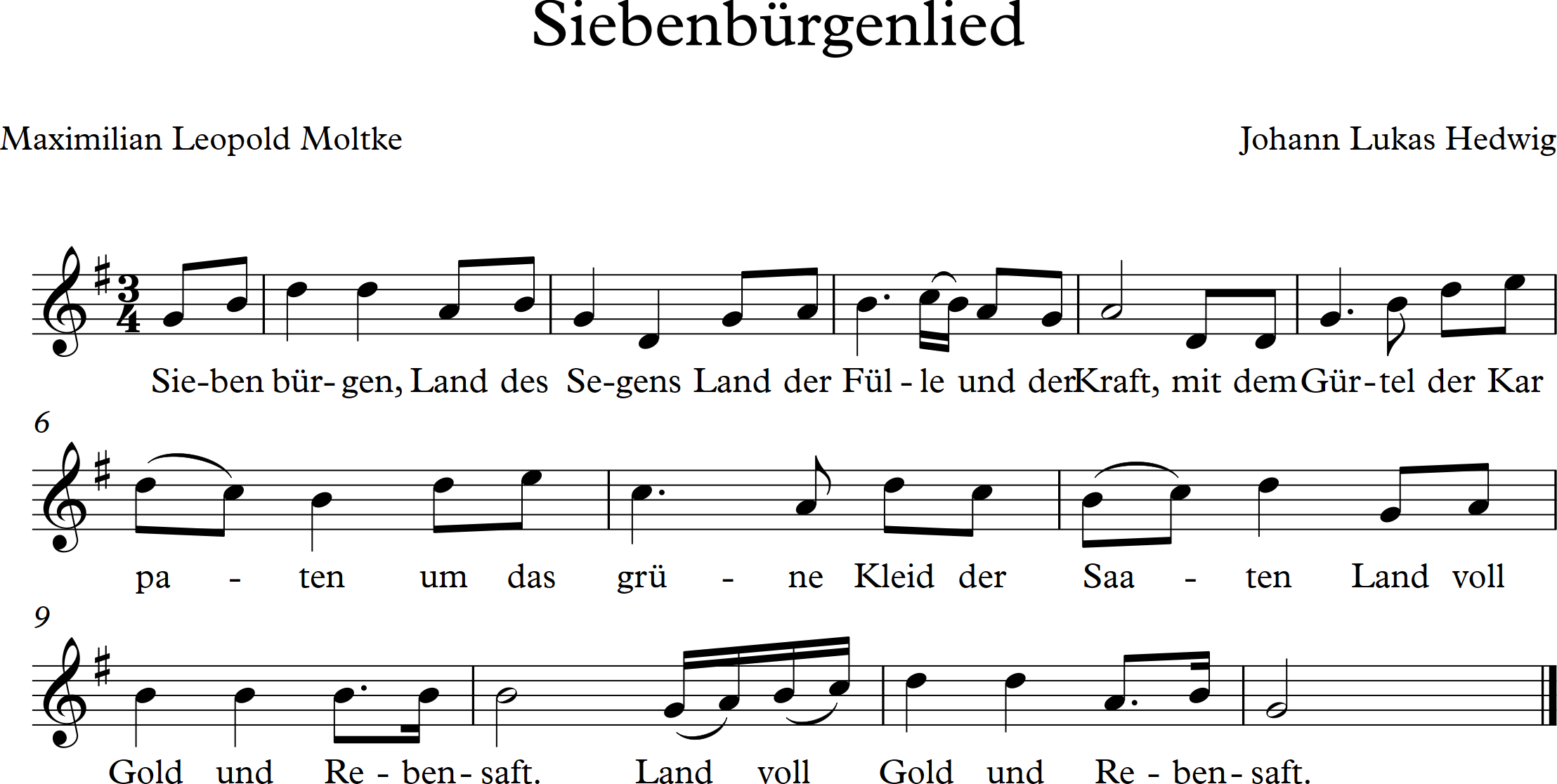
- Sheet music for Siebenbürgenlied
- anthem of Transylvania, Romania (unofficial regional anthem), Transylvanian Saxons (official anthem of this community)
- Lyrics: Maximilian Leopold Moltke, 1846
- Music: Johann Lukas Hedwig, 1848

Siebenbürgenlied (literally Transylvania song or Transylvania's song) is a regional anthem composed by Johann Lukas Hedwig with lyrics by Maximilian Leopold Moltke originally as a regional anthem for the Transylvanian Saxons. The anthem has been translated into both Hungarian by Ritoók János and Romanian by Dan Dănilă, thus becoming an unofficial anthem for Transylvania as a whole.

== Lyrics ==
German	Hungarian	Alternate Hungarian	Romanian
1. Siebenbürgen, Land des Segens; Land der Fülle und der Kraft, mit dem Gürtel der Karpaten um das grüne Kleid der Saaten ||: Land voll Gold und Rebensaft. :||	1. Erdélyország áldott földje, bőség és erő hazája. Kárpátoknak őlelése zöld erdő, s arany kalász. ||: Erdélyország a hazánk. :||		1. Transilvanie, mândră țară; cu puteri și bogății de Carpați împrejmuită, cu verdeață răsădită, ||: plai cu aur și cu vii. :||
2. Siebenbürgen, Meeresboden; einer längst verflossnen Flut; nun ein Meer von Ährenwogen, dessen Ufer waldumzogen, ||: an der Brust des Himmels ruht! :||			2. Transilvanie, țărm de mare; răsărit din vechi talaz, astăzi spice-n legănare odihnesc la sân de zare ||: între maluri verzi de brazi. :||
3. Siebenbürgen, Land der Trümmer; einer Vorzeit, stark und groß, deren tausendjährige Spuren ruhen noch in deinen Fluren ||: ungeschwächtem Ackerschoß! :||			3. Transilvanie, vechi ruine; dintr-un ev îndepărtat, urme mari și milenare odihnesc sub glia care ||: rodnicia și-a păstrat. :||
4. Siebenbürgen, grüne Wiege; einer bunten Völkerschar! Mit dem Klima aller Zonen, mit dem Kranz von Nationen ||: um des Vaterlands Altar! :||			4. Transilvanie, leagăn verde; pentru oricare vlăstar, reunești climele toate, națiuni, cununi purtate ||: pe al patriei altar. :||
5. Siebenbürgen, grüner Tempel; mit der Berge hohem Chor, wo der Andacht Huldigungen steigen in so vielen Zungen ||: zu dem einen Gott empor! :||			5. Transilvanie, plai de graiuri; diferite-n fel și ton, dar în rugăciuni unite urcă limbile-mpărțite ||: spre dumnezeiescul tron. :||
6. Siebenbürgen, Land der Duldung; jedes Glaubens sichrer Hort, mögst du bis zu fernen Tagen als ein Hort der Freiheit ragen ||: und als Wehr dem freien Wort! :||	6. Erdélyország drága kincsünk, Minden nép és minden vallás, arra kér most adj erőt. Isten, áldd meg Erdély földjét! ||: Erdélyország a hazánk. :||	6. Erdélyország, türelem föld, minden hitnek tábora! Óvd meg hosszú századokon át fiaidnak szabadságjogát, S légy a tiszta szó hona!	6. Transilvanie tolerantă; adăpost credințelor, până-n zile-ndepărtate apără în libertate ||: ființa cuvintelor. :||
7. Siebenbürgen, süße Heimat; unser teures Vaterland! Sei gegrüßt in deiner Schöne und um alle deine Söhne ||: schlinge sich der Eintracht Band! :||	7. Erdélyország édes hazánk Őseinknek otthona, Gyönyörűség melynek párját e világon nem leled. ||: Erdélyország a hazánk. :||	7. Erdélyország, édes földünk, drága jó szülőhazánk! Áldott légy szépségedért, s tájaidnak minden gyermekét ||: egyetértés fogja át! :||	7. Transilvanie, patrie dulce, țară a părinților, frumusețe, slavă ție, fiii tăi în armonie ||: să-i unească doar un dor. :||
