= Jsem Moravan =

Moravian regional anthem

English: I am a Moravian
- Regional anthem of Moravia (Unofficial since 1949)
- Also known as: Ó Moravo (English: Oh Moravia)
- Lyrics: Kašpar Pivoda, 1904
- Music: Václav Novotný, 1867

Audio sample
- "Jsem Moravan" (instrumental): file; help

Jsem Moravan (English: I am a Moravian), sometimes also called Ó Moravo (English: Oh, Moravia), is a song composed by Václav Novotný in late 19th century. Jsem Moravan, is, along with Moravo, Moravo and Bože cos ráčil, considered one of the anthems of historical region Moravia in the Czech Republic. Out of these three, Jsem Moravan is most commonly recognized as the primary unofficial anthem, although it is rarely used nowadays.

The exact date of composition of the song is not known, but it very likely that Novotný composed it during his stay in the Moravian town of Ivančice. Jsem Moravan was first published in the Písně pro školní mládež (English: Songs for school youth) collection in 1867. The lyrics were later rewritten by Kašpar Pivoda and released in 1904 as part of the Sokolský zpěvník (English: Sokol song-book). The newer version has become popular among members of the all-age gymnastics organization Sokol, which also promoted Czech nationalism amongst the Czech people in opposition to Austrian and Hungarian dominance within Austria-Hungary. Sokol was disbanded in Czechoslovakia after the Communist coup d'état in 1948 due to ideological reasons and the fact that many Sokol members participated as part of the Western resistance against Nazi Germany. Although the Sokols reappeared briefly during the Prague Spring of 1968, the Sokol movement was revived again after the 1989 revolution. Jsem Moravan is sometimes sung by Sokols on important occasions since then.

== Lyrics ==
=== Pivoda's lyrics ===
Jsem Moravan — toť chlouba má,
kdo, rcete, otčinu mou zná?
Kdo zná ten požehnaný kraj,
ten utěšený zemský ráj?
Ó Moravo — ty vlasti má,
tys země moje přemilá!

Zde Rostislav, zde Svatopluk
mé drahé mluvy střehli zvuk.
Zde posvátný konával děj
na Velehradě Metoděj.
Ó Moravo, ó vlasti má,
tys dávnou slávou věnčená!

Zde Olomúc, kde Jaroslav
byl potřel Tatar vrahóv dav;
zde Moravan vždy k boji stál,
když ve zbraň volal jeho král!
Ó Moravo, ó vlasti má,
tys krví otců svěcená!

Zde každý kraj má nový div —
zde onen dobrý lid je živ.
Ten miluje svou Moravu
a dbá o její oslavu.
Jsem Moravan, k tomu se znám
a za vlast statek, život dám!

=== Original lyrics ===
Moravan jsem — to je má slast,
kdo znáte moji krásnou vlast?
K té já se srdcem vroucím znám,
pro ni rád statek, život dám?
Ó Moravo — ó vlasti má,
tys drahých předků otčina!

Zde Rostislav, zde Svatopluk
mé drahé mluvy střehli zvuk.
Zde první konal svatý děj
na Velehradě Methoděj.
Ó Moravo — ó vlasti má!
Velehrad tvůj září znova!

Zde Hostýn náš, zde Olomouc,
kde zlomena zlých Tatar moc.
Zde s Moravany český lev,
pro svobodu proléval krev.
Ó Moravo, ó vlasti má!
Krví praotců svěcená!

Zde Macocha, zde divů kraj,
zde brněnský se pyšní háj.
Zde obilí bohatý zdroj,
zde Hanáků malebný kroj.
Ó Moravo, ó vlasti má!
Ty's vší krásou požehnaná.
