= Garbo sa Kabisay-an =

Provincial anthem of Negros Oriental

English: Pride of the Visayas
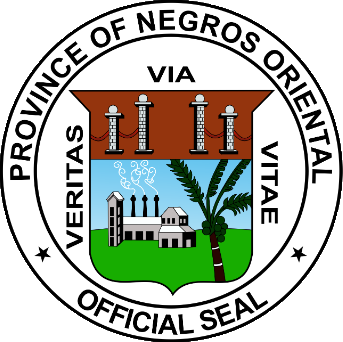
- Provincial anthem of Negros Oriental
- Also known as: Negros Oriental Hymn
- Lyrics: Mamerto Villegas, 1983
- Music: Mamerto Villegas, 1983
- Adopted: June 20, 2002

"Garbo sa Kabisay-an" (Cebuano for "Pride of the Visayas"), also known as the Negros Oriental Hymn, is the official anthem of the province of Negros Oriental in the Philippines.

== History ==
"Garbo sa Kabisay-an" was composed and written by Mamerto Villegas (1945–2011), a professor of music at both Silliman University and the Negros Oriental State University. It was then entered into a competition organized in 1983 by the government of governor Lorenzo Teves to select a new provincial hymn, where it won the grand prize.

Although the song won the competition and was subsequently performed whenever the Sangguniang Panlalawigan of Negros Oriental was in session, the provincial government had organized another competition for a provincial hymn in 1998 during the governorship of Emilio Macias to celebrate the province's centennial, which was won by Zoe Lopez with the song "Sidlakang Negros", also known as "Lalawigan Kong Mahal" ("My Beloved Province"). While that song was reportedly recognized as the provincial hymn during Macias's governorship, during the governorship of his successor George Arnaiz, the Sangguniang Panlalawigan passed a provincial ordinance on June 20, 2002 formalizing the adoption of "Garbo sa Kabisay-an" as the provincial hymn. It was later clarified that "Sidlakang Negros" was actually adopted as the province's centennial hymn and not as the general provincial hymn, but the adoption of "Garbo sa Kabisay-an" as the provincial hymn over "Sidlakang Negros" was overshadowed by a political dispute between Arnaiz and Macias over the treatment of the province's name in both songs, which in turn extended into a debate over which song should be adopted as the provincial hymn.

Mandatory performance of "Garbo sa Kabisay-an" was not required until 2022, when a subsequent ordinance was passed during the governorship of Pryde Henry Teves. The ordinance was passed in order to "reboot" promotion of the song in the run-up to that year's Buglasan Festival in Dumaguete the following month.

In 2023, Villegas was posthumously given an award by the provincial government for writing and composing the song.

== Lyrics ==
Original Cebuano version
Garbo sa Kabisay-an
penned by Mamerto Villegas
English translation
Pride of the Visayas

Masaarong pulo ning kapudpud-an
Garbo ka sa Kabisay-an
Nag-una sa mga kauswagan
Himsog ug kayuta-an

Ikaw ang hiyas sa bag-ong katilingban
Sa Silangang Kabisay-an
Ang imong bulak ug mga kabunturan
Kaanyag dili hitupngan

Koro:
𝄆 Negros Oriental, yuta kang natawhan
Ikaw kanunay ning akong dughan
Ning kasingkasing ikaw ang bahandi
Nga wala'y saping ikabugti

Ang imong ugma di namo pasagdan
Andam kaming tanan
Kay sa imo unyang kalambu-an
Magmalipayon ang tanan 𝄇

Beautiful island of the archipelago
You are the pride of the Visayas
Leading the way in progress,
health and happiness

You are the jewel of the new society
In Eastern Visayas
Your flowers and mountains
Are of unparalleled beauty

Chorus:
𝄆 Negros Oriental, land of my birth
You are always in my chest
In my heart you are the treasure
That there is no substitute for

We will not neglect your tomorrow
We the people are prepared
Because of your development
Everyone will be happy 𝄇

While the lyrics of the song have been interpreted as a call for Oriental Negrenses to love their province, the lyrics also erroneously point to the province as being located in Eastern Visayas, as opposed to Central Visayas where the province was actually located at the time it was written.

== Performance and use ==
Singing "Garbo sa Kabisay-an" is mandatory whenever there is an official event being held in the province of Negros Oriental. Although the song was initially required to be performed at the end of an event except during school flag ceremonies, where it would be performed immediately after "Lupang Hinirang", the Philippine national anthem, this was changed during the governorship of Manuel "Chaco" Sagarbarria in 2024 when performance of the song immediately after "Lupang Hinirang" was required in all instances. Sagarbarria subsequently adopted the song's title as the official "mantra" of his administration.

Performance of the song is also required during the sign-on and sign-off sequences of all cable television and radio stations operating in Negros Oriental, as well as in movie theaters before the start of a movie screening, while its performance by private entities, though not required, is encouraged.
