= Madreterra =

Official anthem of Sicily, Italy

English: "Motherland"
- Regional anthem of Sicily
- Music: Vincenzo Spampinato
- Published: 2003
- Adopted: 10 December 2001

Audio sample
- Madreterra: file; help

"Madreterra" (Italian: [ˌmadreˈtɛrra]; Sicilian: Matriterra [ˌmaʈɽɪˈtɛrːa]) is the official anthem of Sicily since 2003. It was the first regional anthem in Italy, and was written by Vincenzo Spampinato, who was chosen after an official competition. However, other songs (notably, Suoni la tromba, English translation: Blare the trumpet) have been traditionally regarded as national anthems of Sicily. The lyrics are in Italian. Madreterra was performed in public for the first time at the Ancient theatre of Taormina on 14 June 2003 by the Sicilian Symphony Orchestra and the Musa 2000 Choir.

== Lyrics ==
Italian lyrics

Sei tu il sorriso che fa ritornare
sei la Montagna di cui senti il cuore
con l'universo non ti cambierei!
Madreterra di Uomini e Dei

Sei tu l'inverno che riesce a scaldare
l'estate antica che fa innamorare
sei la cometa che io seguirei
Madreterra di Uomini e Dei

Sicilia terra mia triangolo di luce in mezzo al mondo
Sicilia terra mia un sole onesto che non ha tramonto!
Sicilia sei così... il paradiso è qui!

Tra le tue braccia è nata la Storia
sulla tua bocca « Fratelli d'Italia »!
e per difenderti io morirei
Madreterra di Uomini e Dei

Sicilia terra mia triangolo di pace per il mondo
Sicilia terra mia tu « rosa aulentissima » nel tempo
Sicilia terra mia bandiera liberata in mezzo al vento
Sicilia sei così... il paradiso è qui!

English translation

You are the smile that makes you come back
you are the Mountain whose heart you feel
with the universe I would not change you!
Motherland of Men and Gods

You are the winter that manages to warm up
the ancient summer that makes you fall in love
you are the comet that I would follow
Motherland of Men and Gods

Sicily my triangular land of light in the middle of the world
Sicily my land an honest sun that has no sunset!
Sicily you are like this... paradise is here!

History was born in your arms
on your lips "Brothers of Italy"!
and to defend you I would die
Motherland of Men and Gods

Sicily my triangular land of peace for the world
Sicily my land you "long-lasting scented rose"
Sicily my land freed flag in the middle of the wind
Sicily you are like this... paradise is here!
