= Himno de Aguascalientes =

Official anthem of the Mexican state of Aguascalientes

English: Anthem of Aguascalientes
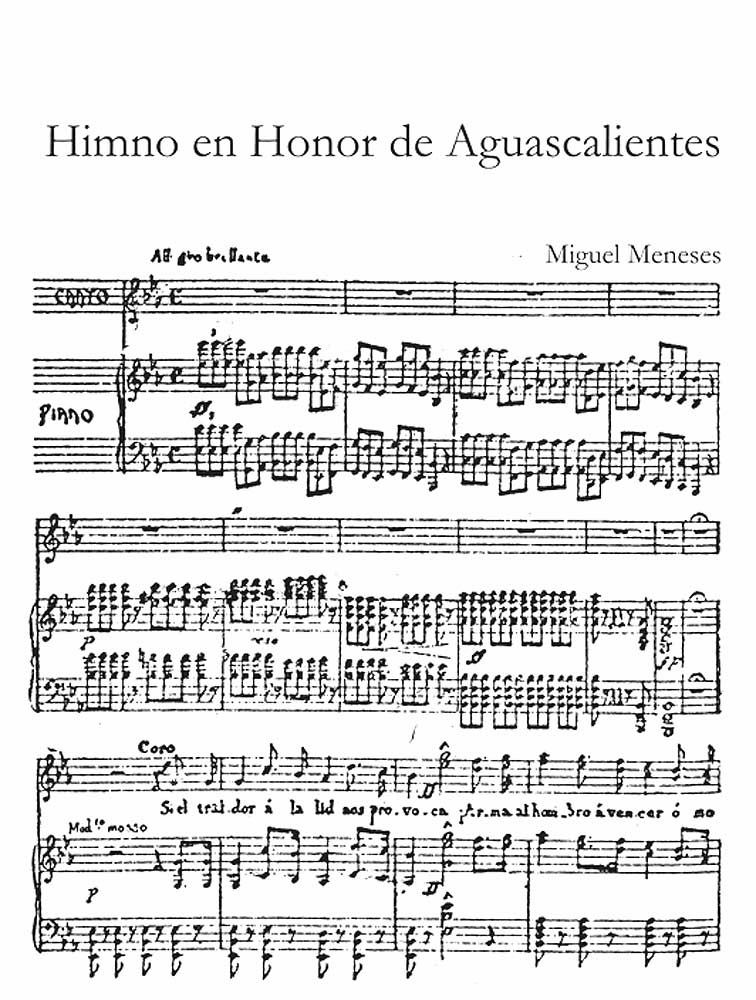
- Original score of the Anthem of Aguascalientes
- State anthem of Aguascalientes
- Also known as: Himno en Honor de Aguascalientes (English: Anthem in Honor of Aguascalientes)
- Lyrics: Esteban Ávila Mier, 1867
- Music: Miguel Meneses, 1867

Audio sample
- Himno a Aguascalientes (Instrumental): file; help

The Anthem of Aguascalientes (Spanish: Himno de Aguascalientes, Spanish pronunciation: [ˈimno estaˈtal de aɣwaskaˈljentes]), officially Himno en Honor de Aguascalientes, is the official anthem of the Mexican state of Aguascalientes. It was composed by Esteban Ávila Mier, former governor, and music by Miguel Meneses on 1867.

== Lyrics ==
Short version:

Spanish original	English translation	IPA transcription
Coro: Si el traidor a la lid nos provoca ¡Arma al hombro a vencer o morir! Que el rehusar si el clarín nos convoca Es afrenta en el mundo vivir.	Chorus: If the traitor causes us to fight Weapon in shoulder to win or die! That to refuse if the bugle summons us Is a disgrace in the living world.	Coro: [si el tɾajˈðoɾ a la ˈlið nos pɾoˈβoka] [ˈaɾma al ˈombɾo a βenˈseɾ o moˈɾiɾ] [ke el re.uˈsaɾ si el klaˈɾin nos komˈboka] [es aˈfɾenta en el ˈmundo βiˈβiɾ]
Estrofa I y IV; Cuna ilustre de Chávez y Arteaga, Que a la patria mil héroes le das, Ciudad bella, hermosísima maga, Dios te otorgue el progreso y la paz.	Stanza I and IV: Illustrious cradle of Chávez and Arteaga, That the country you give a thousand heroes, Beautiful city, beautiful sorceress, God grant you peace and progress.	Estrofa I y IV: [ˈkuna iˈlustɾe ðe ˈtʃaβes i aɾteˈaɣa] [ke a la ˈpatɾja mil ˈeɾoez le ˈðas sjuˈðað ˈβeʎa eɾmoˈsisima ˈmaɣa] [ˈdjos te oˈtoɾɣe el pɾoˈɣɾeso i la ˈpas]
Estrofa II: Nunca el sol de los libres su rayo Niegue airado a tu bóveda azul, Ese sol esplendente de Mayo; Que a tu gloria ha prestado su luz.	Stanza II: Never the free rays of the sun Angrily deny your blue dome, That shining sun of May; That to your glory has provided light.	Estrofa II: [ˈnuŋka el sol de loz ˈliβɾes su ˈraʝo] [ˈnjeɣe ajˈɾaðo a tu ˈβoβeða aˈsul] [ˈese sol esplenˈdente ðe ˈmaʝo] [ke a tu ˈɣloɾja a pɾesˈtaðo su ˈlus]
Estrofa III: Él alumbre tu senda de flores, Él ¡oh Patria! Otros triunfos te dé, Y no logren los ciegos traidores Nunca, nunca su luz obtener.	Stanza III: He illuminates your path with flowers He, oh Fatherland! Other triumphs gives to you, And the blind traitors fail Never, ever get its light.	Estrofa III: [ˈel aˈlumbɾe tu ˈsenda ðe ˈfloɾes] [ˈel o ˈpatɾja ˈotɾos ˈtɾjumfos te ˈðe] [i no ˈloɣɾen los ˈsjeɣos tɾajˈðoɾes] [ˈnuŋka ˈnuŋka su ˈlus oβteˈneɾ]

== See also ==
- Aguascalientes
