= Petite fleur aimée =

Unofficial regional anthem of Réunion

Petite Fleur aimée
English: Little Beloved Flower
- Regional anthem of Réunion
- Also known as: Petite Fleur fanée (English: Little Faded Flower)
- Lyrics: Georges Fourcade
- Music: Jules Fossy

Audio sample
- file; help

Petite Fleur aimée ("Little Beloved flower", also known as Petite Fleur fanée, "Little Faded flower") is the best known song from the island of Réunion. While "La Marseillaise" is the official national anthem, "Petite Fleur aimée" is considered an unofficial local anthem.

The text is written in Réunion Creole by Georges Fourcade and the music is by Jules Fossy.
