= Venezuelan Fiesta =

Studio album by Aldemaro Romero and his Salon Orchestra
- Released: 1956
- Recorded: 1956
- Genre: Folk-classical
- Label: RCA
- Producer: Aldemaro Romero

Aldemaro Romero and his Salon Orchestra chronology
Flight to Romance (1956)	Venezuelan Fiesta (1956)	Criollísima (1957)

Venezuelan Fiesta is a 33-RPM LP album by Venezuelan composer/arranger/conductor Aldemaro Romero, released in 1956, under contract with RCA Victor.

This was the second Romero's album with RCA Victor, featuring popular Venezuelan pieces, and the release of the joropo Venezuelan Fiesta, continuing with the modernization of Venezuelan folk music, upgrading it from folk instrumentations to full modern orchestral versions, and making it palatable to international audiences.

== Album information ==
From the back cover of the album:

- Las Bellas Noches de Maiquetía — Valse Venezolano (The Beautiful Nights of Maiquetía). "This composition by Pedro Arcila Ponte was inspired by the beauty of the nights of Maiquetía, a seaport near La Guaira."
- Brisas del Zulia — Valse (Breezes of Zulia). "This is a musical tribute to Lake Maracaibo, written by Amable Espina."
- Geranio — Valse (Geranium). "Written by one of Venezuela's foremost composers, Pedro Elías Gutiérrez, who also wrote the famous joropo Alma Llanera. The Vienna style is predominant."
- Amalia — Valse-Joropo. "A very famous valse-joropo written by Francisco de Paula Aguirre and Leoncio Martínez "Leo"."
- El Cari-Cari — Joropo. "One of the standard favorites of the country."
- El Cumaco de San Juan — Merengue. "A typical merengue from Caracas."
- El Polo Coriano — Polo. "An outstanding example of this type of music."

== Track listing ==
Track	Song title	Composer	Genre
1.	Las Bellas Noches de Maiquetía	Pedro Arcila Ponte	Venezuelan waltz
2.	Brisas del Zulia	Amable Espina	Venezuelan waltz
3.	Geranio	Pedro Elías Gutiérrez	Venezuelan waltz
4.	Marisela	S. Díaz Peña	Joropo
5.	Quejas del alma	Delgado Briceño	Venezuelan waltz
6.	Juliana	Lionel Belasco	Venezuelan waltz
7.	Venezuelan Fiesta	Aldemaro Romero	Joropo
8.	Amalia	Francisco de Paula Aguirre/ Leoncio Martínez	Waltz-joropo
9.	El Cari-Cari	Rafael Romero	Joropo
10.	Tu Partida	Augusto Brandt	Love song
11.	El Cumaco de San Juan	Francisco Pacheco	Venezuelan merengue
12.	El Polo Coriano	Arranger: Aldemaro Romero	Polo

== See also ==
- Venezuela
- Aldemaro Romero
- Venezuelan music
