= La Mejor Música de los Andes Venezolanos =

Studio album by Aldemaro Romero and his Orchestra
- Released: 1961
- Recorded: 1961
- Genre: Folk-Classical; Andean music
- Label: Cymbal
- Producer: Aldemaro Romero

Aldemaro Romero and his Orchestra chronology
unknown	La Mejor Música de los Andes Venezolanos	Los Diablos

La Mejor Música de los Andes Venezolanos is a 33 rpm LP album by Venezuelan composer, arranger, and conductor Aldemaro Romero, released in 1961 by the record label Cymbal.

Aldemaro Romero presents at this album popular pieces from the Venezuelan Andes, upgrading this waltzes and bambucos from its folk instrumentations to full modern orchestral versions, at the celebration of the 400th anniversary of San Cristóbal city.

== Track listing ==
Track	Song title	Composer	Genre
1.	Cantos de mi tierra	L. E. Armas and L. E. Flores	Venezuelan bambuco
2.	Quejas del alma	M. A. Delgado Briceño	Venezuelan waltz
3.	Tu Nombre	Alejandro Fernández	Venezuelan bambuco
4.	El Huérfano	Alfonso Espinel Gómez	Venezuelan waltz
5.	Punta de Soga	Telésforo Jaime	Joropo
6.	Pluma y Lira	Telésforo Jaime	Venezuelan waltz
7.	Rosa Haydee	Enrique Duque	Venezuelan bambuco
8.	Penas de Amor	Fernando Torre Olivares	Venezuelan waltz
9.	Aires Andinos	José María Rivera	Venezuelan bambuco
10.	Entre Amigos	Telésforo Jaime	Venezuelan waltz
