= Culture of Venezuela =

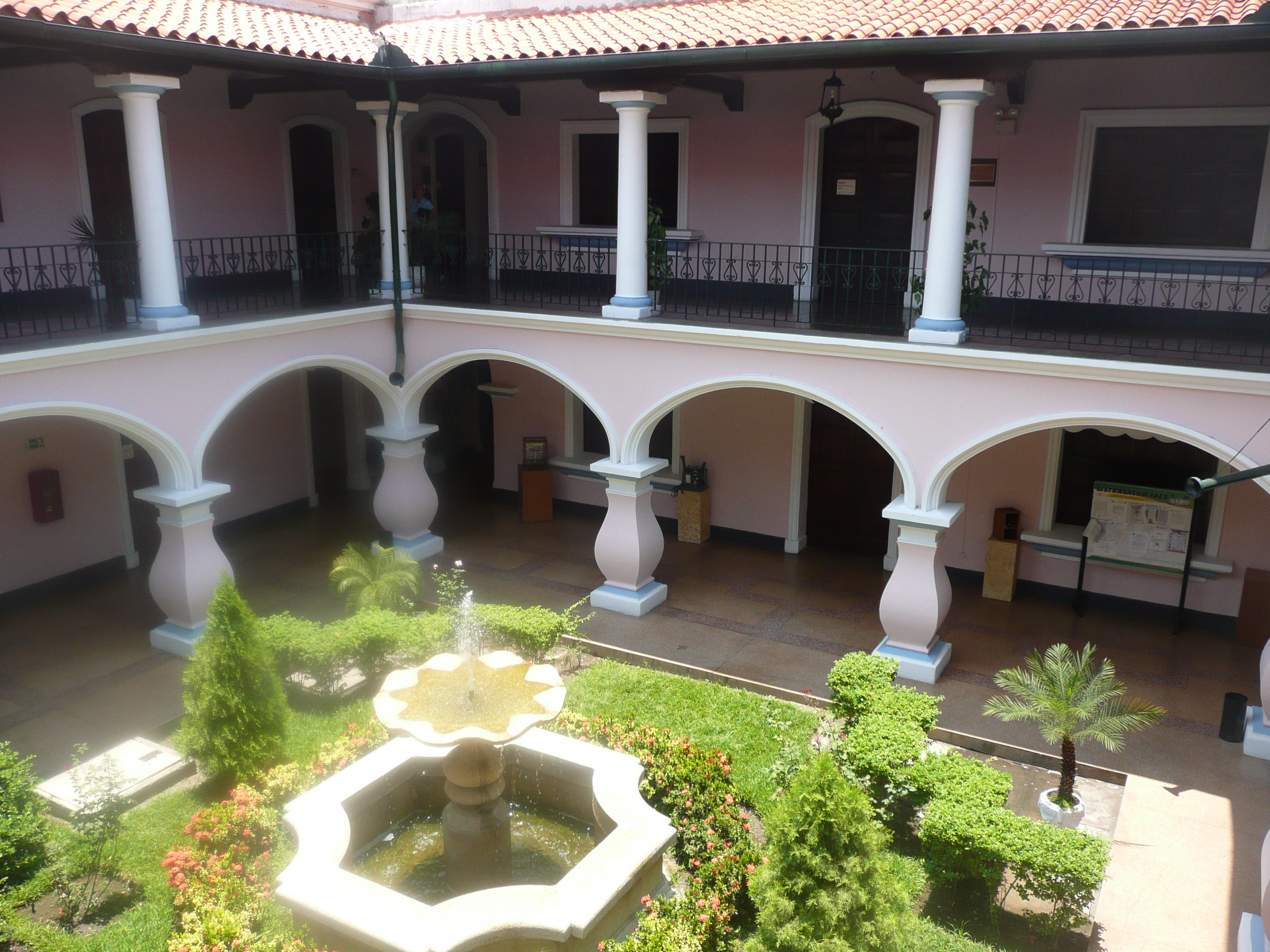
Instituto Arnoldo Gabaldón, declared on August 30, 1984, as a National Historic Landmark

The culture of Venezuela is a mix of three primary roots: Indigenous, African and Spanish. This process is known as mestizaje, which originated at the beginning of the colonial period with the arrival of Spanish settlers and, later, enslaved African populations, who integrated with the native indigenous peoples. Today, Venezuelan culture is characterized by its music, gastronomy, art and literature, while its people are recognized for their strong sense of companionship and national pride.

== People ==
Venezuela's cultural heritage includes the original Venezuelan natives, the Spanish and Africans who arrived after the Spanish conquest, and the 19^{th} century A.D. waves of immigration that brought many: Italians, Portuguese, Arabs, Germans, Moroccan Jews and others from the bordering countries of South America. Approximately 93% of Venezuelans reside in urban areas, primarily in the northern part of the country. Even though almost half of the land area is south of the Orinoco River, only 5% of the population lives in that area. More than 71% of the population call themselves Catholic and most of the rest are other Christians, mainly Protestant.

Venezuela's heritage, art, and culture have been heavily influenced by its Caribbean context, including its historic architecture, art, landscape and boundaries.

The World Values Survey has shown Venezuelans to be among the happiest people in the world, with 55% of those questioned saying they were "very happy" in 2007.

== Art ==
Venezuelan art was initially dominated by religious themes but began to emphasize historical and heroic representations in the late 19^{th} century, a shift led by Martín Tovar y Tovar. Modernism took over in the 20^{th} century. Venezuelan Artists include: Arturo Michelena, Cristóbal Rojas, Antonio Herrera Toro, Armando Reverón, Manuel Cabré; the kinetic artists Jesús-Rafael Soto and Carlos Cruz-Díez; and contemporary artist Yucef Merhi.

== Literature ==
Venezuelan literature originated soon after the Spanish conquest of the mostly pre-literate indigenous societies; it was dominated by Spanish influences. Following the rise of political literature during the War of Independence, Venezuelan Romanticism, notably expounded by Juan Vicente González and Fermin Toro, emerged as the first important genre in the region. Although mainly focused on narrative writing, Venezuelan literature was also advanced by poets such as Andrés Eloy Blanco and Fermín Toro.

Major writers and novelists include: Rómulo Gallegos, Teresa de la Parra, Arturo Uslar Pietri, Adriano González León, Miguel Otero Silva, and Mariano Picón Salas. Andrés Bello was also an educator and poet. Others, such as Laureano Vallenilla Lanz and José Gil Fortoul, contributed to Venezuelan positivism.

== Music ==
Folk music of Venezuela is exemplified by the groups Un Solo Pueblo and Serenata Guayanesa. The national musical instrument is the cuatro. Typical musical styles and pieces mainly emerged in and around the llanos region, including: "Alma Llanera" (by Pedro Elías Gutiérrez and Rafael Bolívar Coronado), Florentino y el Diablo (by Alberto Arvelo Torrealba), Concierto en la Llanura (by Juan Vicente Torrealba) and "Caballo Viejo" (by Simón Díaz).

The Zulian gaita is also a popular style, generally performed during Christmas. The national dance is the joropo. Teresa Carreño was a 19^{th}-century piano virtuoso. The Simon Bolivar Youth Orchestra has performed in many European concert halls, including at the 2007 Proms.

== Festivals ==
The celebration of Corpus Christi includes dancing in the streets in masks and uniforms. The tradition dates back to Spanish colonial times.

== Sports ==
Baseball is Venezuela's most popular sport. There is a Venezuela national football team.

== Gastronomy ==
The food (ingredients, style of cooking, inside and outside influences, specific customs applied) of this country is part of the Latin American world.
