= Dinner in Caracas =

Studio album by Aldemaro Romero
- Released: 1955 LP; 1971 CC; 1993 CD
- Recorded: 1954
- Genre: Folk-classical
- Length: 36:52
- Label: RCA
- Producer: Aldemaro Romero

Aldemaro Romero chronology
| Dinner in Caracas (1955) | Dinner in Colombia (1956) |

Dinner in Caracas is a 33-RPM LP album by Venezuelan composer/arranger/conductor Aldemaro Romero. It was released in 1955, via RCA Victor.

This album was to be the first of a very successful series of records, whose names began with "Dinner in ..." featuring popular Latin American pieces. The Dinner in Caracas album was innovative work, a stylish modernization of Venezuelan folk music, upgrading it from folk instrumentations to full modern orchestral versions, and making it palatable to international audiences. Recording was made by Romero in the Webster Hall Studios in New York City, owned by RCA Victor, in December, 13th and 14th of 1954. This LP was released in 1955.

The album Dinner in Caracas included Venezuelan-only pieces such as: Alma Llanera, Dama Antañona, La Reina, Adiós a Ocumare, Conticinio, Endrina, Fúlgida Luna, Besos en mis sueños, Serenata, Luna de Maracaibo, and Sombra en los Médanos. In 1993, the master tape of this recording was digitized and a CD version was released by BMG US Latin, owner in that time of RCA Victor's latinamerican music archives.

AllMusic referred to it as "one of the best-selling albums in the history of the South American charts".

== Track listing ==
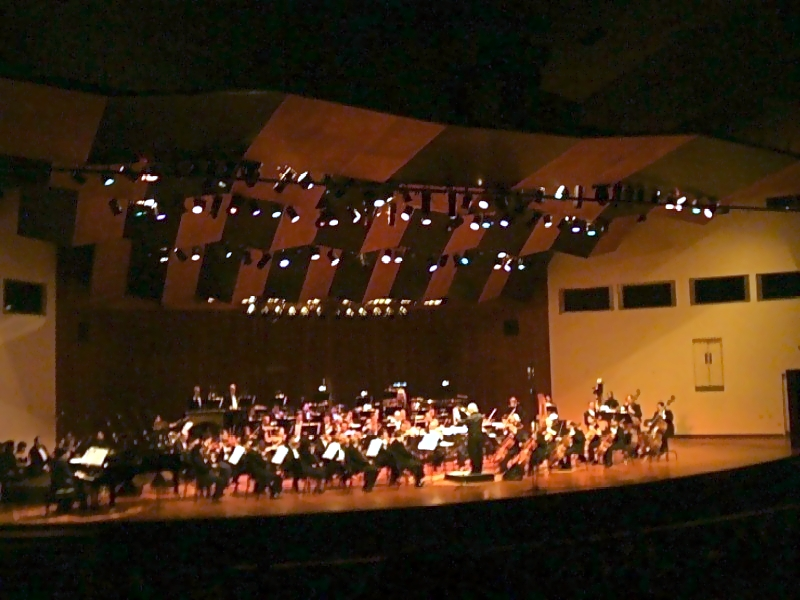
Aldemaro Romero directing the Municipal Symphony Orchestra of Caracas, at the celebration of the 50th anniversary of Dinner in Caracas

| Track | Song title | Composer | Time |
|---|---|---|---|
| 1. | Alma Llanera | Pedro Elías Gutiérrez | 2:31 |
| 2. | Luna de Maracaibo | Lionel Belasco | 3:53 |
| 3. | Endrina | Napoleón Lucena | 4:56 |
| 4. | Conticinio | Laudelino Mejías | 3:11 |
| 5. | La Reina | Amable Espina | 3:39 |
| 6. | Adios a Ocumare | Angel M Landaeta | 3:46 |
| 7. | Sombra en Los Médanos | Rafael Sánchez López | 2:37 |
| 8. | Serenata | Manuel E. Pérez Díaz | 2:54 |
| 9. | Dama Antañona | Leoncio Martínez / Francisco de Paula Aguirre | 3:41 |
| 10. | Fúlgida Luna | Compilation: Vicente Emilio Sojo | 2:45 |
| 11. | Besos En Mis Sueños | Augusto Brandt | 3:08 |
| 12. | Barlovento | Eduardo Serrano | 2:31 |
