= Criollísima =

Studio album by Aldemaro Romero and his Salon Orchestra
- Released: 1957
- Recorded: 1956
- Genre: Folk-classical
- Label: RCA
- Producer: Aldemaro Romero

Aldemaro Romero and his Salon Orchestra chronology
Venezuelan fiesta (1956)	Criollísima (1957)	Almendra (1957)

Criollísima is a 33-RPM LP album by Venezuelan composer/arranger/conductor Aldemaro Romero, released in 1957, under contract with RCA Victor and distributed by Grabadora Venezolana de Discos.

== Track listing ==
Track	Song title	Composer	Genre
1.	Concierto en la Llanura	Juan Vicente Torrealba	Pasaje
2.	Que bellas son las Flores	Dr. Gómez Peraza	Venezuelan waltz
3.	El Bachaco, Mi Coletón, Josefina	Reyna, Lorenzo Herrera, Lorenzo Herrera	Joropo
4.	Visión Porteña	Pedro Pablo Caldera	Venezuelan waltz
5.	Selección de Merengues	Arranger: Aldemaro Romero	Venezuelan merengues
6.	Quitapesares	Carlos Bonnet	Joropo
7.	Rosa Gentil	Miller and Blakut	Venezuelan waltz
8.	Canta tu Ruiseñor	Lorenzo Herrera	Venezuelan merengue
9.	El Cigarrón	Juan Vicente Torrealba	Golpe
10.	El Chivo	Balbino García	Venezuelan merengue

== Miscellanea ==
- The woman at the cover of the album is the Venezuelan Miss World 1955, Susana Duijm.
- The album was recorded in November 1956 at the Mexican RCA Victor studios.
- The production and distribution was in charged of the company Grabadora Venezolana de Discos.
