= El Garrasí =

Album by Aldemaro Romero

Studio album by Aldemaro Romero and his Salon Orchestra
- Released: 1959
- Recorded: 1958
- Genre: Folk-classical
- Label: Cymbal
- Producer: Aldemaro Romero

Aldemaro Romero and his Salon Orchestra chronology
Venezuela	El Garrasí

El Garrasí is a 33-RPM LP album by Venezuelan composer/arranger/conductor Aldemaro Romero, released in 1959, with the record label Cymbal.

The album features popular Venezuelan pieces, continuing with the modernization of Venezuelan folk music, upgrading it from folk instrumentations to full modern orchestral versions, and making it palatable to international audiences, and the presentation of two compositions by Romero, El Garrasí and Dos Golondrinas.

Romero explains at the back cover of the album, the process of recording, the origin of his new compositions and his travel to New York City.

== Track listing ==
Track	Song title	Composer	Genre
1.	El Garrasí	Aldemaro Romero	Seis Numerao and Seis Corrido
2.	Esta es Venezuela	César Viera	Venezuelan merengue
3.	Andino	Johnnie Quiroz	Venezuelan waltz
4.	La Fiesta	Vicente Cedeño	Venezuelan waltz
5.	Arroz con leche	Arranger: Aldemaro Romero	Child song
6.	Sinfonía del Palmar	Juan Vicente Torrealba	Pasaje
7.	Dos Golondrinas	Aldemaro Romero	Venezuelan waltz
8.	San José	Lionel Belasco	Venezuelan waltz
9.	Voraz	Compilation: Vicente Emilio Sojo	Song
10.	Valencia	Juan Vicente Torrealba	Pasaje
11.	Compadre Pancho	Lorenzo Herrera	Venezuelan merengue

== Miscellanea ==
- The album was recorded in October 1958 at the Columbia Recording Company studios in New York City.
- The Garrasí is part of the Venezuelan plains popular clothing.
- Some of the musicians at the recording were part of the NBC Symphony Orchestra, Metropolitan Opera House, and the New York Philharmonic.
