= Los Diablos =

Studio album by Aldemaro Romero
- Released: 1962
- Recorded: 1962
- Genre: Folk-Classical
- Label: Cymbal
- Producer: Aldemaro Romero

Aldemaro Romero chronology
La Mejor Música de los Andes Venezolanos	Los Diablos	unknown

Los Diablos is a 33-RPM LP album by Venezuelan composer/arranger/conductor Aldemaro Romero, released in 1962 by the record label Cymbal.

- Performed by Aldemaro Romero and his Salon Orchestra.
- The name and the cover of the album, are dedicated to the Venezuelan tradition of the Dancing Devils of Corpus Christi day.

== Track listing ==
Track	Song title	Composer
1.	Río Manzanares	J. A. López
2.	Jarro Mocho	Federico Vollmer
3.	Guayanesa	Juan Vicente Torrealba
4.	Ansiedad	Chelique Sarabia
5.	Madrugada Llanera	Juan Vicente Torrealba
6.	Los Diablos	Aldemaro Romero
7.	Las Tenazas	Rafael Romero
8.	El Muñeco de la ciudad	Adrián Pérez
9.	Barloventeño	Juan Vicente Torrealba
10.	Juramento	J. A. López
11.	El Regional	L. Jacobo
12.	Chupa tu Mamey	Lorenzo Herrera
