= Valses venezolanos =

Compilation album by Aldemaro Romero
- Released: 1990
- Genre: Instrumental
- Label: Fonográfica Gilmar

Valses venezolanos (Venezuelan waltzes) is a compilation album by Aldemaro Romero and his hall orchestra, released in 1990 by the record label Fonográfica Gilmar.

== Track listing ==
| Track | Song title | Composer |
|---|---|---|
| 1. | Dama Antañona | Francisco de Paula Aguirre |
| 2. | Visión Porteña | Pedro Pablo Caldera |
| 3. | Adiós a Ocumare | Ángel María Landaeta |
| 4. | Conticinio | Laudelino Mejías |
| 5. | Que bellas son las flores | Francisco de Paula Aguirre |
| 6. | Sombra En Los Médanos | Rafael Sánchez López |
| 7. | Quejas del alma | Dr. Delgado Briceño |
| 8. | Flor de Loto | Francisco J. Marciales |
| 9. | Pluma y Lira | Telésforo Jaimes |
| 10. | Brisas del Zulia | Amable Espina |
| 11. | Morir es Nacer | Rafael Andrade |
| 12. | Vals Venezolano | Antonio Lauro |
| 13. | El Campo Esta Florido | Telésforo Jaimes |
| 14. | Las Bellas Noches De Maiquetia | Pedro R. Arcila Aponte |
| 15. | La Ruperta | unknown |
| 16. | Pablera | Juan Ramón Barrios |
