= Carlos Brandt =

Venezuelan author, naturopath, philosopher and vegetarianism activist (1875–1964)

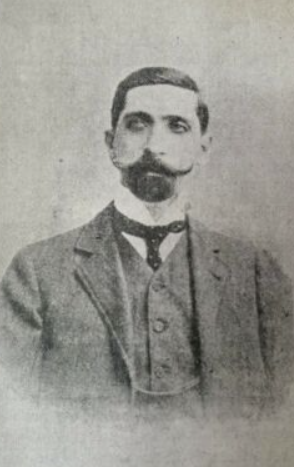
- Born: 11 October 1875; Miranda
- Died: 27 February 1964 (aged 88); Caracas
- Occupations: Naturopath, philosopher

Carlos Brandt (11 October 1875 – 27 February 1964) was a Venezuelan author, naturopath, philosopher and vegetarianism activist.

== Biography ==
He was born in Miranda, Venezuela, the son of a German immigrant Karl Brandt, a coffee planter and exporter, and Zoraida Tortolero, mother to Carlos, Juan Luis, Fernando, Augusto, Asteria and Mary. His younger brother (by 17 years) was the composer Augusto Brandt. He studied in Puerto Cabello Elementary School and was sent to Germany to join the Pro Gymnasium in Hamburg, aged 14 to 19. He toured Germany and France, and returned to Venezuela at 19, fluent in German, French and English. At 25, he met Leo Tolstoy, which encouraged his literary ambitions. In 1901, his first book was published, La belleza de la mujer (The Beauty of Women).

Under the dictatorship of Juan Vicente Gómez, he was imprisoned and then exiled to Spain, Italy, Belgium, the Netherlands and then the United States. Protesting the dictatorship, he encountered the anarchist organization "Generación Consciente" in Barcelona. Brandt promoted natural living, pacifism, free-thinking, liberty and vegetarianism, in his writings, as well as being a biographer and novelist. Many of his books emerged during his time in exile. In 1913, Fundamentos de la Moral, also known as El problema vital (The Vital Problem), was published with a prologue by Albert Einstein. For his work, the American School of Naturopathy awarded him an honorary doctorate. With this and further writings, Brandt counted as one of the original founders of the vegetarianism movement. He founded the Venezuelan Naturist Society and promoted a pantheistic philosophy.

His books were published in Spanish, Italian, Flemish, Dutch, English, French and German. As well as his historic and philosophical writings, Brandt had an extensive correspondence with authors such as George Bernard Shaw, Leo Tolstoy, Albert Einstein, Benedict Lust (one of the founders of naturopathy), Ernst Haeckel, Max Nordau, Gabriela Mistral, Raffaele Garofalo, Alfred Russel Wallace and Elmer Lee. In 1901, he translated Tolstoy's Church and State into Spanish.

Brandt returned to Venezuela in 1958 where he lived in anonymity and extreme poverty. He died from complications of hemiplegia in Caracas after refusing surgery, aged 88.

== Naturopathy ==
Brandt, along with Arnold Ehret, Benedict Lust and Louis Kuhn, was one of the original pioneers of naturopathy. Brandt taught Nicolás Capó (born around 1902), who wrote his first book circa 1935. Many of Brandt's books were distributed through Capo's Instituto de Trofoterapia, in Barcelona. Brant published the naturopathic magazine Cultura.

Capó and José Castro (Galician naturopath), were pioneers of dietary health and healing in Spain, during the 1920s to 1940s, opening Escuela Naturo-Trofologica in Barcelona in 1925. Capo left Spain for Argentina around 1939, fleeing from Francoist Spain.

Brandt is listed in Who’s Who In Latin America.

== Works ==
- Análisis Critica De La Biblia / Critical Analysis Of The Bible
- Bajo La Tiranía De Cipriano Castro / Under The Tyranny Of Cipriano Castro
- Bajo la tiranía de Cipranio Castro, Tipografía Vargas, 1952
- Beethoven, Su Vida, Su Obra, Y El Sentido De Su Música / Beethoven: His Life, His Work & The Sense Of His Music 1940, 1954
- Belleza De La Mujer, Tratado De Las Proporciones Armoniosas Del Cuerpo Humano Y De La Importancia Filosófica, Artística Y Sociológica De La Belleza Física / The Beauty Of Woman: The Harmonious Proportions Of The Human Body & The Philosophical, Artistic & Sociological Importance Of Physical Beauty 1935
- Camino De Perfección / The Way Of Perfection
- Cervantes: El Titán De La Literatura Y Su Obra Maestra: El Quijote / Cervantes: The Titan Of Literature & His Masterpiece: Don Quixote, 1942, Las Novedades, Caracas
- Colon / Columbus
- Diógenes: El Atleta De La Voluntad / Diogenes: The Willing Athlete
- El Anarquismo En América Latina / Anarchism In Latin America
- El Estado Y La Iglesia / The Estate & The Church
- El fanatismo religioso, Editorial Símbolo
- El Fundamento De La Moral New York: Benedict Lust, 1918
- El misterioso almirante y su enigmático descubrimiento by Carlos Brandt Ministerio de Educación Nacional, Dirección de Cultura, 1949
- El Misterioso Almirante Y Su Enigmático Descubrimiento: Biografía Caracas / The Mysterious Admiral & His Enigmatic Discovery: A Biography Of Caracas
- El Modernismo / Modernism 1994
- El Problema Económico-Social / The Social-Economic Problem
- El Problema Vital / The Vital Problem: The Path To Health, Wisdom & Universal Peace 1924, 1969, 1999, Instituto De Trofoterapia, Barcelona and Benedict Lust Publishers, New York (1924)
- El Sendero De La Salud / The Path Of Health
- El Vegetarianismo / Vegetarianism
- Filosofía Del Vegetarismo / The Philosophy Of Vegetarianism 1927, Librería Sintes, Barcelona
- Giordano Bruno, El Mártir Más Auténtico De La Historia / Giordano Bruno: The Most Authentic Martyr Of History Kier, 1940
- Hight and Right (in English)
- Jesús, El Filósofo Por Excelencia / Jesus: The Philosopher Par Excellence 1939
- La Belleza De La Mujer / The Beauty Of Women
- La Clave Del Misterio / The Key To The Mystery
- La Dictadura Gomecista / The Gomecist Dictatorship
- La Época Del Terror: En El País De Gómez / The Age Of Terror: In The Country Of Gomez
- La Paz Universal / Universal Peace
- La Superstición Médica / Medical Superstition
- Leonardo da Vinci: El Profeta De Los Profetas / Leonardo da Vinci: The Prophet Of Prophets, Editorial Latorre Caracas 1939, Simon & Schuster 1993
- Los Enigmas De La Ciencia / The Enigmas Of Science
- Naturaleza Frugivora Del Hombre / The Frugivorous Nature Of Man
- Patología Racional: Las Enfermedades, Su Origen Y Curación / Rational Pathology: Illnesses, Their Origin & Cures 1942, 1949, Ediciones Universo, Toulouse
- Pitágoras Y Vegetarianismo / Pythagoras & Vegetarianism, 1970, Instituto De Trofoterapia, Barcelona
- Pitágoras, Padre De La Sabiduría Europea / Pythagoras, Father Of European Wisdom
- Siluetas Luminosas / Luminous Silhouettes
- Spinoza Y El Panteísmo / Spinoza & Pantheism 1972
- Fundamentos de la Moral (The Vital Problem)
