= El Diablo Suelto =

Song
- Language: Spanish
- Published: 1888
- Composer: Heraclio Fernández Noya

El Diablo Suelto (The Devil on the Loose), published originally in 1888, is one of the most renowned songs in Venezuela's music history. Composed by Heraclio Fernández, this popular waltz created in the western state of Zulia is played as a joropo, as it forms part of Venezuelan folk culture.

Popular musician and composer Enrique Hidalgo wrote little-known lyrics for the song, which were recorded by Gualberto Ibarreto in 1976.

== See also ==
- Venezuelan music
