= Flight to Romance =

Studio album by Aldemaro Romero
- Released: 1956
- Recorded: 1956
- Genre: Folk-classical
- Label: RCA
- Producer: Aldemaro Romero

Aldemaro Romero chronology
Dinner in Colombia (1956)	Flight to Romance (1956)	Venezuelan Fiesta (1956)

Flight to Romance is a 33-RPM LP album by Venezuelan composer/arranger/conductor Aldemaro Romero, released in 1956, under contract with RCA Victor.

After a very successful series of records, whose names began with "Dinner in ...", featuring popular Latin American pieces, starting in 1955 with Dinner in Caracas, Romero released Flight to Romance with folk music of the Andes.

== Track listing ==
Track	Song title	Composer	Genre
1.	Estrellita del Sur	Felipe Coronel Rueda	Waltz
2.	Sombras	Carlos Brito	Pasillo
3.	Huaino	Raúl Barragán	Huaino
4.	El Plebeyo	Felipe Pinglo	Waltz
5.	Cueca	Raúl Barragán	Cueca
6.	La Coqueta	Luis Moreno	Rondeña
7.	Nube Gris	Eduardo Márquez	Waltz
8.	Carnaval	Raúl Barragán	Carnaval
9.	Ay Pobrecito		Sanjuanito
10.	La Pampa y la Puna	Carlos Valderrama - Ricardo Walter Stubbs	Indigenous music
11.	Lamento	Rafael Rossi	Bailecito
12.	El Pilahuin	Gerardo Arias	Aire Típico
