= Dinner in Colombia =

Studio album by Aldemaro Romero
- Released: 1956 LP; 1993 CD
- Recorded: 1956
- Genre: Folk-classical
- Label: RCA
- Producer: Aldemaro Romero

Aldemaro Romero chronology
Dinner in Caracas (1955)	Dinner in Colombia (1956)	Flight to Romance (1956)

Dinner in Colombia is a 33-RPM LP album by Venezuelan composer/arranger/conductor Aldemaro Romero, released in 1956, under contract with RCA Victor.

This album was part of a very successful series of records, whose names began with "Dinner in ..." featuring popular Latin American pieces, starting in 1955 with Dinner in Caracas.

== Track listing ==
Track	Song title	Composer
1.	Las Brisas del Pamplonita	Elías M. Soto
2.	Tiplecito de mi vida	Alejandro Wills
3.	Bésame Morenita	Álvaro Dalmar
4.	Flores Negras	C. A. Ortiz
5.	Caprichito	Lucho Bermúdez
6.	El Trapiche	Emilio Murillo
7.	Santa Marta	Eugenio Nobile
8.	Pachito E-ché	Alejandro Tovar
9.	Edelma	Terig Tucci
10.	Chispa	Milciades Garavito
11.	El Boga	Alejandro Wills
12.	Guabina Chiquinquireña	Alberto Urdaneta
