= Ay Mi Llanura =

Song by Arnulfo Briceño
- Released: 1967
- Songwriter(s): Arnulfo Briceño

"Ay Mi Llanura" is a Colombian song in the joropo genre written and performed by Arnulfo Briceño. The song pays tribute to the majesty of the plains of Colombia's Meta Department. In 1967, it won first prize in the VI Festival de la Canción Colombiana. In 1979, it was adopted as the official anthem of the Meta Department.

Viva Music Colombia rated the song No. 19 on its list of the 100 most important Colombian songs of all time. In its list of the 50 best Colombian songs of all time, El Tiempo, Colombia's most widely circulated newspaper, ranked the version of the song by Los Tolimenses at No. 28.
