= Aldemaro Romero =

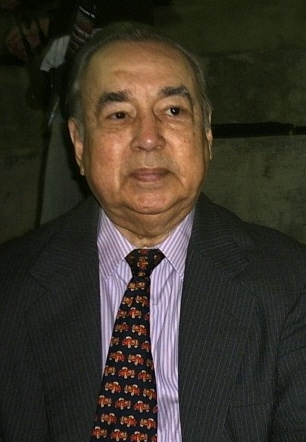

Background information
- Also known as: Maestro Aldemaro Romero; Al Romero
- Born: March 12, 1928; Valencia, Venezuela
- Died: September 15, 2007 (aged 79) Caracas, Venezuela
- Genres: Venezuelan popular music, jazz, Latin jazz, classical, Onda Nueva
- Occupations: Musician, pianist, composer
- Instrument: Piano
- Years active: 1937–2007
- Formerly of: Orquesta Filarmónica de Caracas
- Website: www.aldemaroromero.org

Aldemaro Romero (March 12, 1928 – September 15, 2007) was a Venezuelan pianist, composer, arranger and orchestral conductor. He was born in Valencia, Carabobo State.

== Biography ==
Aldemaro Romero Orchestra

Romero was a prolific composer, creating a wide range of music, such as: Caribbean, Jazz, Venezuelan waltzes, including works for orchestra, orchestra and soloist, orchestra and choir, chamber music, and symphonic works. He began his musical studies with his father, Rafael Romero. In 1941, he moved to Caracas and worked as pianist in nocturnal saloons and dance orchestras. In 1949, he toured in Cuba, and then went to New York. In 1952, he returned to Caracas and established his own dance orchestra.

In 1951, Romero became an arranger at RCA Victor in New York. As a part of this contract, he released his record-breaking Dinner in Caracas album, the first of his Dinner In... series featuring popular Latin American music. In the United States, he collaborated with many musicians, including Dean Martin, Jerry Lee Lewis, Stan Kenton, René Touzent, Machito and Tito Puente. He also toured extensively, performing in various countries: Mexico, Puerto Rico, Colombia, Peru, Brazil, Argentina, Spain, France, Greece, Switzerland, Sweden, Italy, Russia, Egypt, and Japan. Romero is considered the creator of the Venezuelan "New Wave" (Onda Nueva) genre, derived from the joropo and Brazilian Bossa Nova. In the 1970s, Romero recorded in Italy La Onda Maxima (1972) and Onda Nueva Instrumental (1976) with bassist/arranger Pino Presti and drummer Tullio De Piscopo.

In addition to his work in popular music, Romero was also involved in concert music. He founded the Caracas Philharmonic Orchestra in 1979, and was its first conductor. He also guest conducted the London Symphony Orchestra, the English Chamber Orchestra, the National Radio Orchestra of Romania and the Royal Philharmonic Orchestra.

== Personal life ==
He is the father of biologist Aldemaro Romero Jr.; Elaiza Romero, director of choir; and Ruby Romero de Issaev, producer and marketing director for Arts Ballet Theatre of Florida in the U.S.

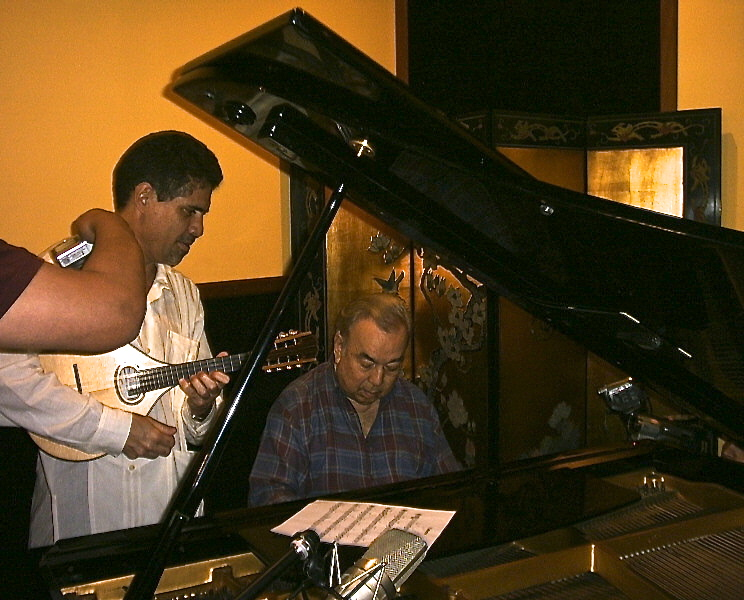
Saúl Vera and Aldemaro Romero

== Awards ==
Awards granted to Aldemaro Romero include:

- Peace Prize of the Soviet Intellectuals, Moscow Cinema Festival (Soundtrack for the Simón Bolivar epic film) (1969)
- First prize in the Majorca Palms Festival
- First prize in the Olympic Games Musical Festival in Greece
- First prize in the Latin Song Festival in Mexico
- Andrés Bello, Diego de Losada, Francisco de Miranda and the Work Merit orders from the Venezuelan Government
- National Music Prize (2000)
- Honorary degrees from the University of Carabobo, University of Zulia, and Lisandro Alvarado University of Barquisimeto (2006)

== Death ==
Aldemaro Romero died in Caracas on September 15, 2007, at the age of 79.

== Discography ==
- Dinner in Caracas (1954)
- Dinner in Colombia (1956)
- Flight to Romance (1956)
- Venezuelan Fiesta (1956)
- Criollísima (1957)
- Almendra (1957)
- Sketches in Rhythm (1958)
- Venezuela (1958)
- Caracas at dinner time (1959)
- El Garrasí (1959)
- La Onda Maxima (1972)
- Onda Nueva Instrumental (1976)

== See also ==
- Aldemaro Romero en Maracaibo
- Venezuelan music
- Valses venezolanos, a compilation album made by Aldemaro Romero and his hall orchestra
