= Sketches in Rhythm =

Studio album by Aldemaro Romero and his dance orchestra
- Released: 1958
- Recorded: 1958
- Genre: Latin music
- Label: RCA
- Producer: Aldemaro Romero

Aldemaro Romero and his dance orchestra chronology
Almendra	Sketches in Rhythm	Venezuela

Sketches in Rhythm is a 33-RPM LP album by Venezuelan composer/arranger/conductor Aldemaro Romero, released in 1958, under contract with RCA Victor.

- Performed by Aldemaro Romero and his dance orchestra.

== Track listing ==
Track	Song title
1.	Toreador
2.	Maquiavelo
3.	Whatever Lola Wants
4.	Con Ají Guaguao
5.	Nuestra Canción
6.	Mango Mangue
7.	Me Gusta El Volutobol
8.	Domitila
9.	Mi Baracutey
10.	Rock'N Mambo Cha-Roll
11.	Yo te quiero
12.	La Matraca
