= Aldemaro Romero Jr. =

Venezuelan-American biologist (born 1951)

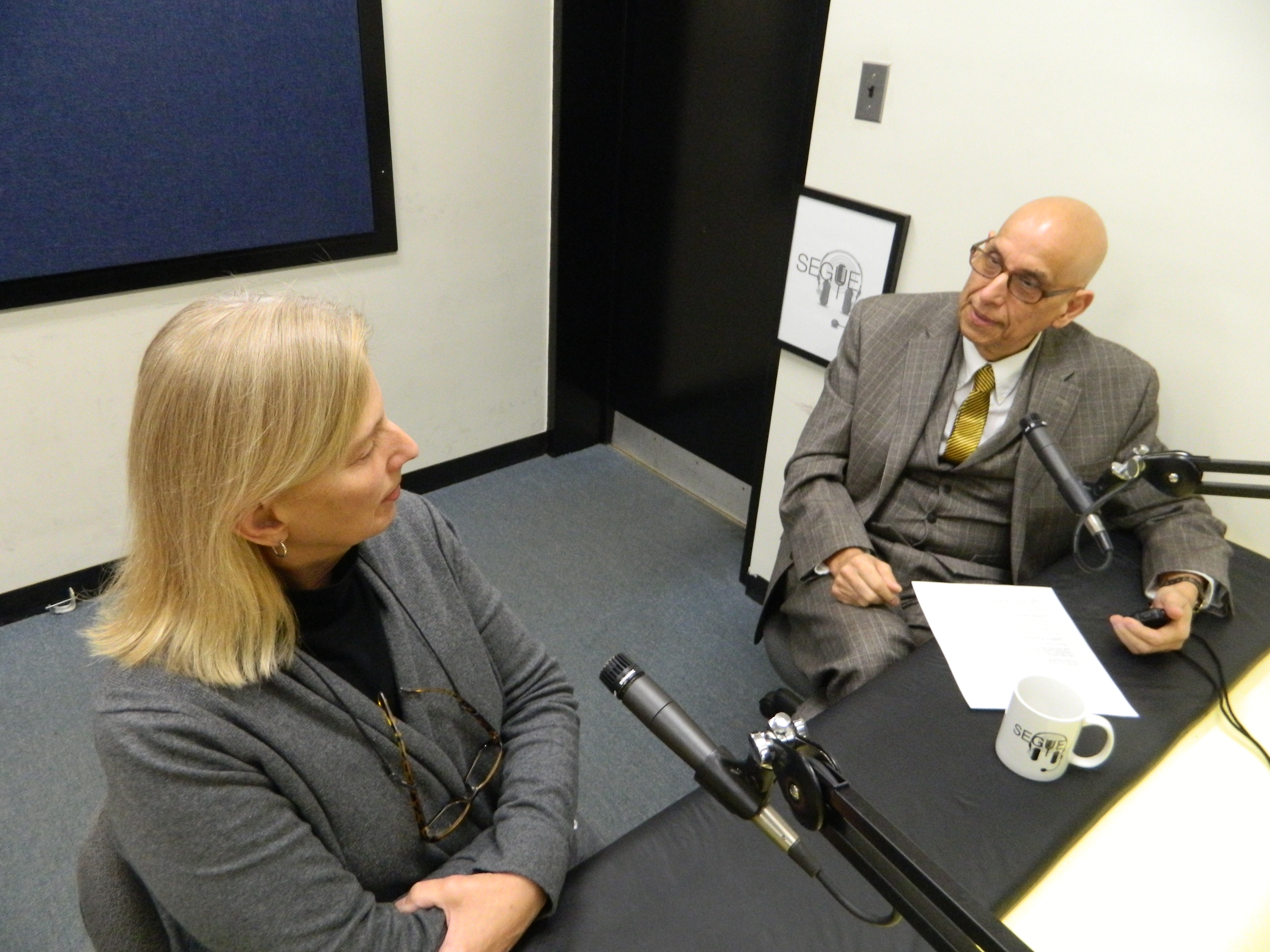
- Romero Jr. hosting the radio show Segue
- Born: Aldemaro Romero Jr. September 11, 1951 (age 75); Caracas, Venezuela
- Education: Universitat de Barcelona; University of Miami
- Known for: Cave biology Marine mammalogy Paleontology; Environmental studies History and philosophy of science Science communication and public outreach University administration
- Scientific career
- Fields: Biology, Education, Academic Administration
- Workplaces: Macalester College, Arkansas State University, Southern Illinois University Edwardsville, Baruch College/City University of New York

Aldemaro Romero Jr. (born September 11, 1951) is a Venezuelan/American scientist, communicator, and public intellectual. He has published more than 1,100 works, more than 30 books and monographs, and produced, directed, written and/or hosted more than 1500 radio shows and 400 TV shows and documentaries in areas ranging from science to history and philosophy. He is known for his approaches of combining field, laboratory and archival studies from different disciplines.

Romero served as dean of the College of Arts and Sciences at Southern Illinois University Edwardsville until 2015 and became dean of the George and Mildred Weissman School of Arts and Sciences at Baruch College/City University of New York, in July 2016. He was named Dean Emeritus by the International Council of Fine Arts Deans in 2021. Also that year he became a visiting scholar at the University of Miami, FL.

== Early life and education ==
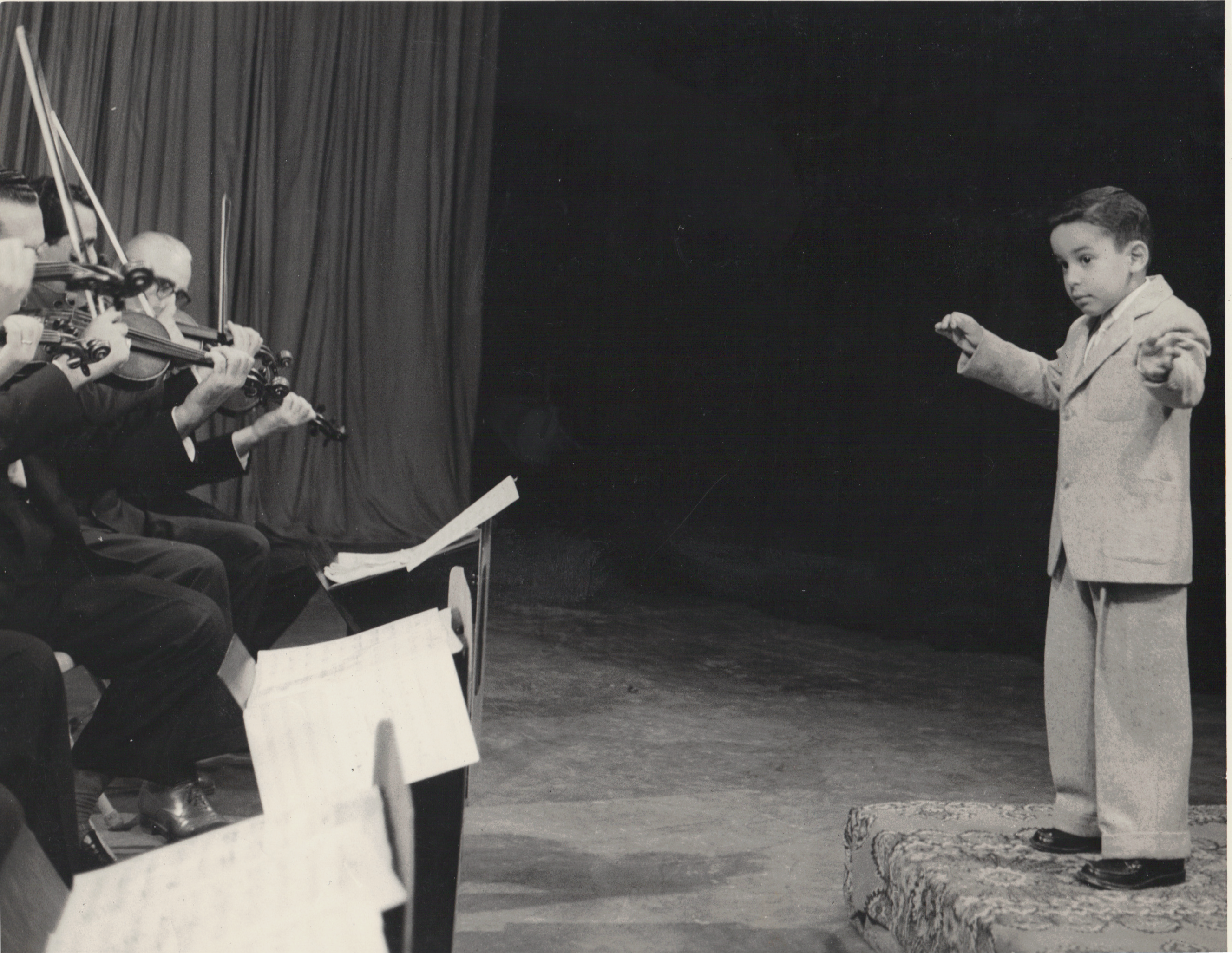
Romero Jr. conducting his father's orchestra

Romero Jr. was born in Caracas, Venezuela, the son of Venezuelan composer, pianist, and orchestra conductor Aldemaro Romero Sr. and his wife, Margot Díaz Saavedra de Romero. While listening to one of his father's records at home when he was four-years-old, his father saw him mimicking a conductor's mannerisms and had him appear on a live TV show conducting his orchestra. That and other TV appearances made him a celebrity in Venezuela even performing in movies conducting an orchestra. In adult life Romero never pursued a professional career as a musician but continued performing as an amateur.

Romero attributes his decision to become a scientist the day the press announced the launch of Sputnik. His decision to study biology was inspired by the Jacques-Yves Cousteau film The Silent World.

He obtained a Licenciatura in biology, with a zoology concentration, from the Universitat de Barcelona, in 1977, while working as a scientist in several institutions and as science writer for several printed, radio, and TV media. He obtained his doctorate in biology from the University of Miami, in Coral Gables, Florida, with a doctoral dissertation on the evolution and behavior of cavefish.

== Career ==
In 1994, he fled his native Venezuela to the United States, after denouncing the killing of dolphins by Venezuelan fishermen and receiving death threats. He paid a fisherman to dissect a live dolphin while he filmed the scene. He has taught at the University of Miami, Miami-Dade Community College, Florida Atlantic University, Macalester College, and Arkansas State University. Romero accepted the position as dean of the College of Arts and Sciences at Southern Illinois University Edwardsville in 2009, a position that he held until 2014. He became dean of the George and Mildred Weissman School of Arts and Sciences at Baruch College/City University of New York, effective July 2016, and stepped down in June 2020.

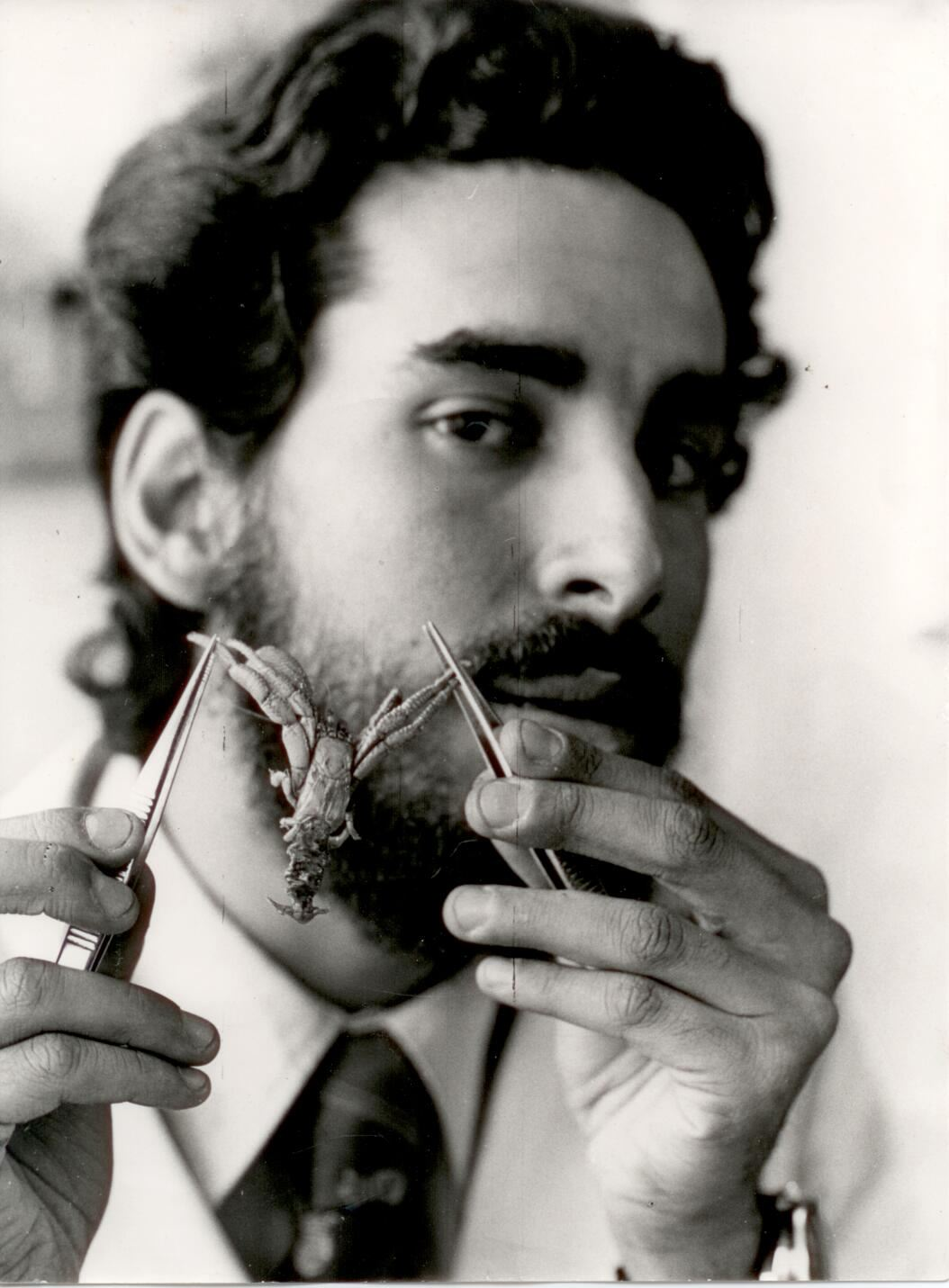
Romero Jr. at the Museum of Zoology of Barcelona

As an undergraduate student in biology at the Universitat de Barcelona in Spain, Romero volunteered at the Museum of Zoology (later renamed as Museum of Natural Sciences) where he created the Hydrobiology Section led a group of other undergraduates to work on aquatic organisms reorganizing some of the collections and re-identifying some of the mislabeled specimens. He also volunteered working at the Museum of Geology of the Seminario Conciliar of Barcelona where he described several new species of Middle Triassic (240-235 million years old) horseshoe crabs and a set of fossils that he described as an entirely new group (subphylum) of animals never reported to science before.

=== Cave biology ===
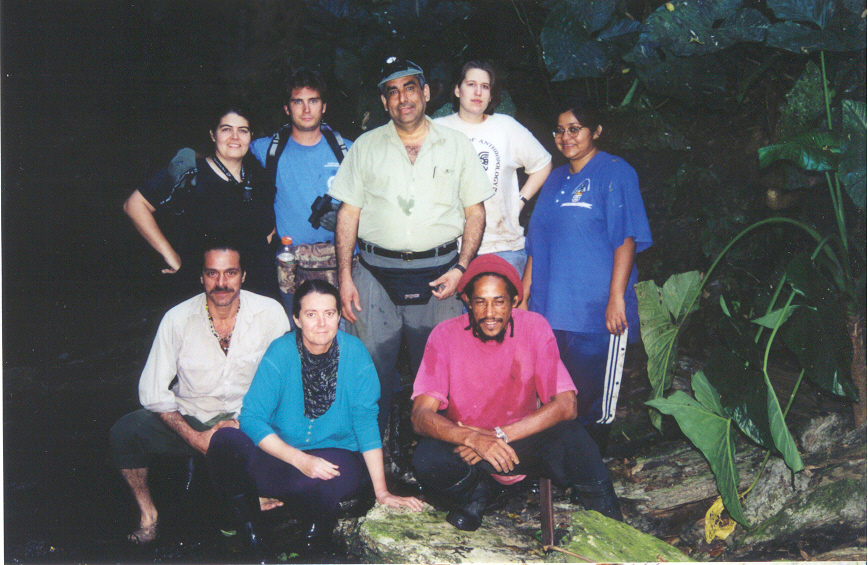
Romero Jr. (center) with a group of collaborators at Cumaca Cave in Trinidad

As a graduate student at the University of Miami, Romero specialized on the study of the evolution, behavior, and ecology of cavefishes. Through these studies he was the first to propose that colonization of cave environments was an active process via behavioral adaptations preceding morphological ones (e.g. blindness and depigmentation). Later he proposed a new hypothesis aimed at explaining the mechanisms leading towards the loss of eyes and pigmentation among these and other cave animals. He suggested that the mechanism behind this phenomenon was a little understood biological process at the time called phenotypic plasticity. This challenged the typological view of all cave creatures as completely differentiated from a genetic viewpoint from their surface (epigean) ancestors. According to Romero all what was needed for the evolution of drastically morphologically distinct cave species were just a few changes in the genes controlling the development of features such as eyes and pigmentation. These and other ideas were summarized in a book.

=== Marine mammalogy ===
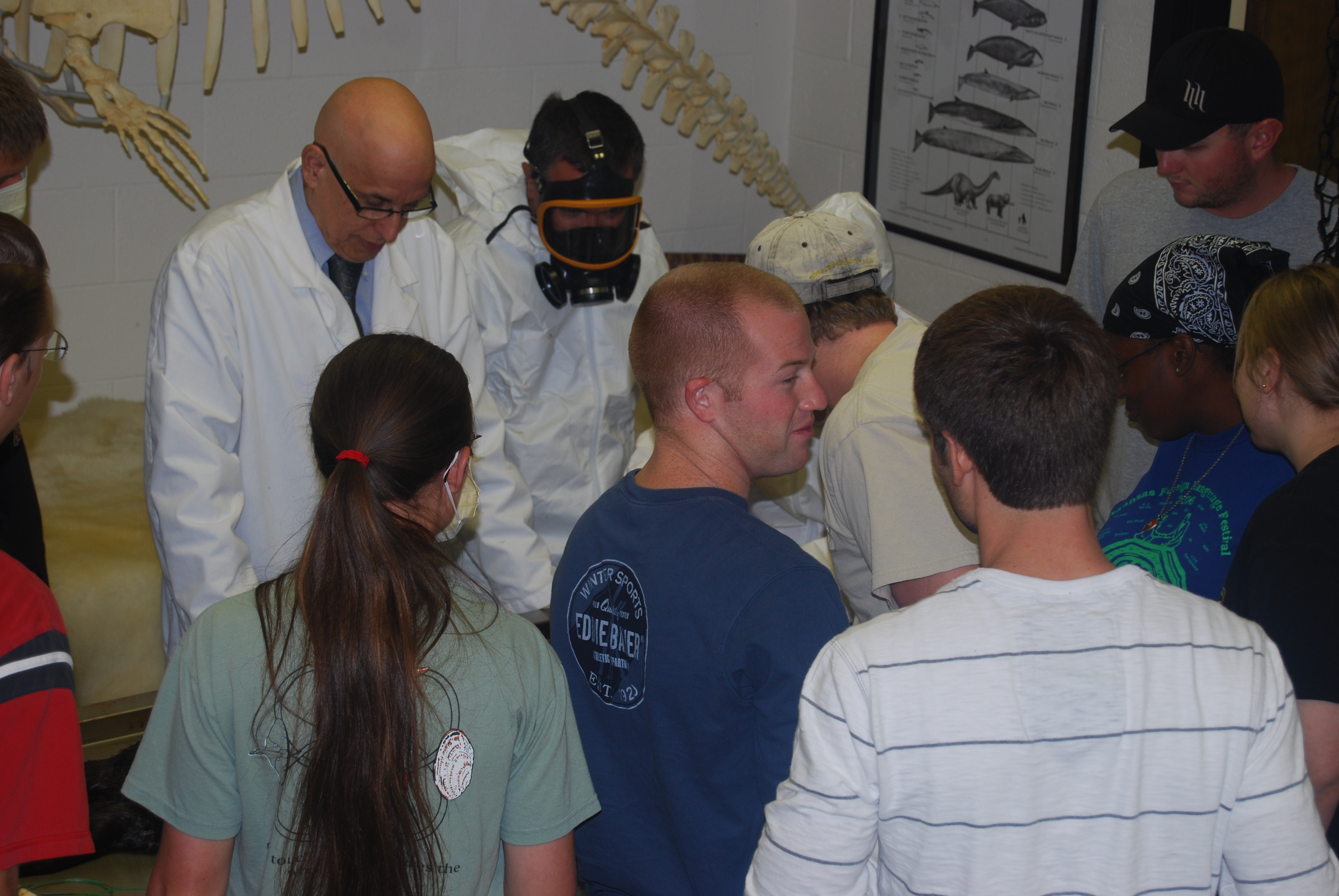
Romero Jr. (left) dissecting a sea otter while teaching marine mammalogy at Arkansas State University

Romero studied the history and practices of exploitation of marine mammals in the Caribbean basin. To that end he conducted field and archival studies in Venezuela, Trinidad and Tobago, Grenada, St Vincent and the Grenadines, Barbados, and Bermuda as well as in libraries and archives in the northeastern U.S. that keep logbooks from whaling vessels. He concluded that local shore whaling combined with Yankee whaling were responsible for the depletion of many whale and dolphin populations throughout the Caribbean basin and that both types of whaling influenced each other from a cultural viewpoint. For example, he recorded chants by local Caribbean whalers that mimicked those of Yankee whalers from the nineteenth century, demonstrating that cultural influence.

=== Paleontology ===
Fossil of one of the paleocyphonautes described by Romero

Romero has described a number of fossil species of horseshoe crabs, jellyfishes (of which there are very few good-quality fossil impressions from around the world) and a group of very unusual species that he grouped under the name of Paleocyphonates, which he described as a new subphylum. He proposed the hypothesis that these extinct, medium-size fossil impressions represented the adult stage of today existing larva cyphonautes and supported such hypothesis not only with paleontological information but with physiological and developmental biology data as well.

=== Environmental studies ===
In addition to his studies on marine mammal exploitation in the Caribbean, Romero also carried out a number of field and archival studies about the exploitation of other marine animals in the same region. One of those allowed him to discover that the first animal population depleted by Europeans in the American continent was of a pearl oyster species (Pinctada imbricata) off the coast of Venezuela. In 1996 he studied historical records and used information about the biology of these and other species to explain its rapid disappearance. Romero also conducted studies on the pollution caused by lead in gasoline in Venezuela – the only country in the Western Hemisphere that still produced leaded gasoline at that time. Those studies showed high levels of that contaminant in the Venezuelan environment and leaded gasoline was later eliminated from the market. He also produced a study about all of the environmental-related programs in U.S. higher education institutions. He concluded that the number of those programs always spiked after the electoral wins by Democratic presidents.

=== History and philosophy of science ===
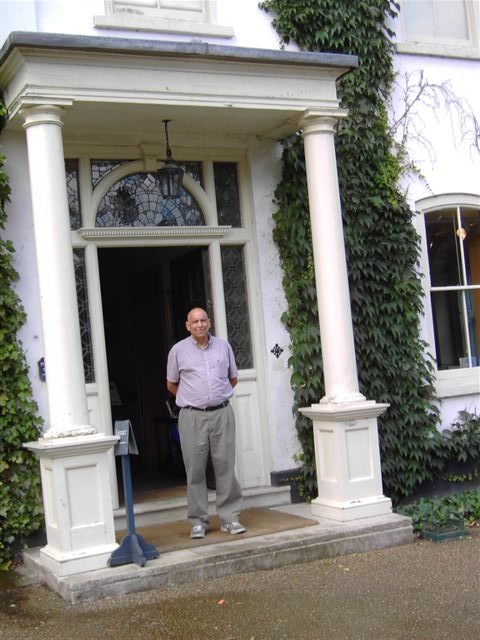
Romero Jr. at the entrance of Charles Darwin's home, Down House

Romero has published and taught on the history and philosophy of science, particularly on evolutionary ideas. Through his work he concluded that the initial resistance by French biologists to accept Charles Darwin's ideas was a combination of catholic mysticism and nationalism. In another study he concluded that environmental classification and intellectual inertia delayed for centuries the acceptance of whales and dolphins as mammals, instead of being considered fish. He has also worked on Darwin's life and published an analysis on how the British scientist was modifying his home at Downe, Kent, in order to accommodate to his scientific interests, his growing family and number of servants, as well as his health problems. To that end he developed an interactive house plan that shows the modifications he made through time.

=== Science communication and public outreach ===
Romero has promoted public understanding of science and the liberal arts, from hosting radio and TV shows, to producing documentaries. He has contributed to the Spanish newspaper El Noticiero Universal, Radio Nacional de España, Televisión Española, Radio Peninsular, Radio Capital, Venevision, the Jonesboro Sun and the Edwardsville Intelligencer, among others. He also hosted his own radio shows on KASU, the college radio station at Arkansas State University and WSIE at SIU, Edwardsville. His work has also appeared in several scholarly publications.

=== Non-profit and university administrator ===
Romero served as a program director for The Nature Conservancy, in Washington, DC, then as founder and executive director of BIOMA, The Venezuelan Foundation for the Conservation of Biological Diversity. He has also served as the director of the environmental studies program at Macalester College, chair of the biological sciences department at Arkansas State University, and dean of the College of Arts and Sciences at Southern Illinois University Edwardsville. He became dean of the George and Mildred School of Arts and Sciences at Baruch College/City University of New York, effective July 2016. His approach to higher education emphasizes experiential learning. He has also been an advocate for the value of a liberal arts education and has produced instructional videos and spoken in public and professional forums. He has led a number of initiatives to develop academic and cultural exchanges between the U.S. and Cuba, exemplified by the agreement between Southern Illinois University, Edwardsville and the University of Havana and other Cuban cultural institutions.

=== Artistic productions ===
Romero has been involved with the visual and performing arts organizing flashmobs, day-long art festivals or Art-a-Thons, while conducting his father's music to critical acclaim. He and his wife are collectors and patrons of visual arts. Pieces of their collections have been exhibited in New York City galleries.

== Personal life ==
Romero met his wife Ana during the early 1970s while both were undergraduate students at the Universitat de Barcelona.
