= Rafael Bolívar Coronado =

Venezuelan musician (1884–1924)

Rafael Bolívar Coronado was a Venezuelan composer and author. He was born on 6 June 1884 in Villa de Cura, Aragua State.

Bolívar is best known for writing the lyrics of the popular joropo song Alma Llanera, in conjunction with composer Pedro Elías Gutiérrez.

Bolívar died on 31 January 1924 in Barcelona, Spain at the age of 39, following complications from influenza.

== Sources ==
- Efemérides de Venezuela
