= Church and State (essay) =

1886 article by Leo Tolstoy

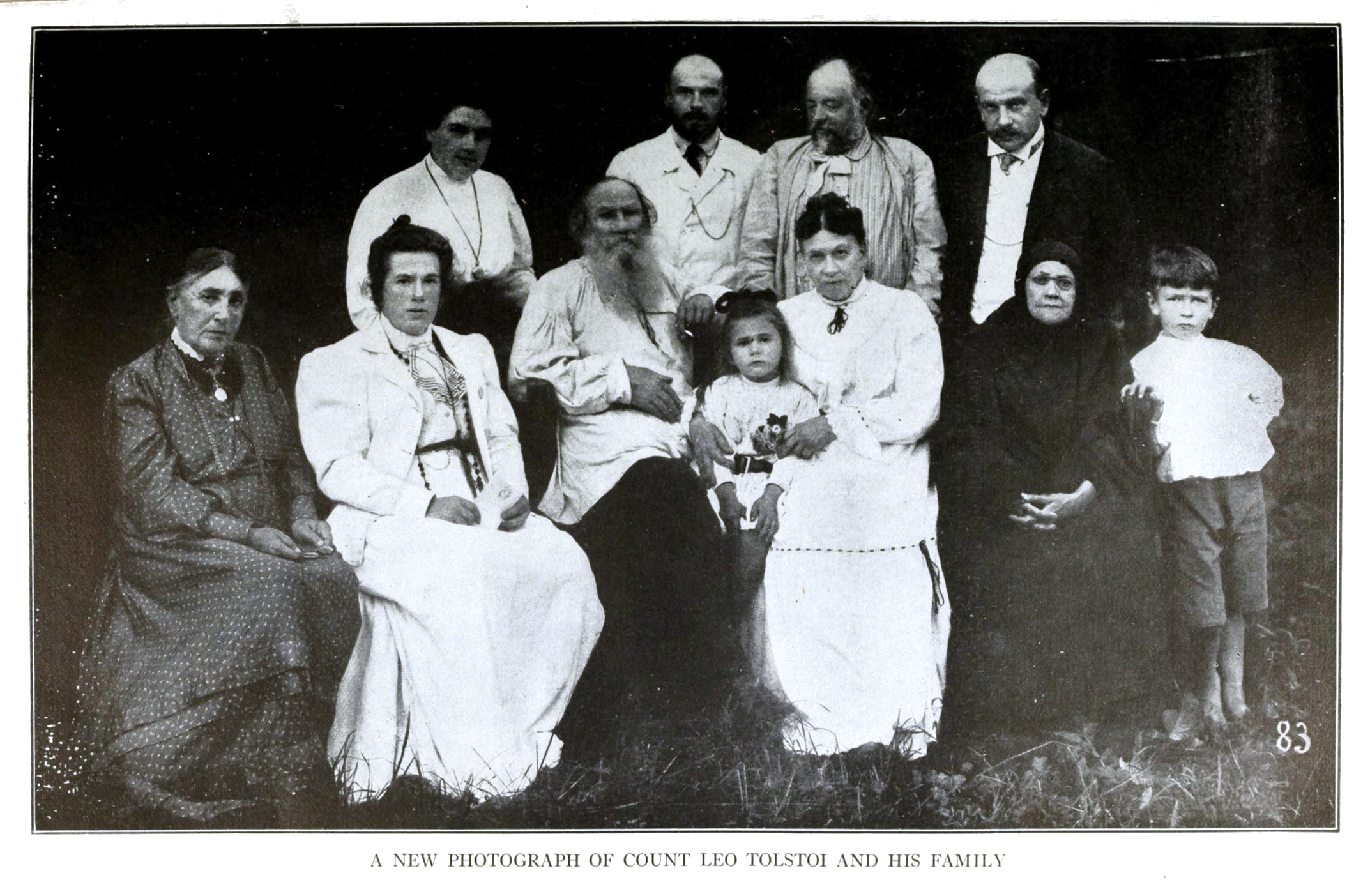
Leo Tolstoy and Family.

"Church and State" is an article by Leo Tolstoy written in 1886. It was translated to English and then published by the anarchist Benjamin Tucker. In this text, Tolstoy condemns anyone who collaborates with the state in committing a war, and especially condemns the Eastern Orthodox Church for supporting the Tsar's wars when Christianity teaches "Thou Shalt Not Kill."

== Legacy ==
It was republished by numerous, diverse groups, such as the Methodist Episcopal Church and the anarchist paper Mother Earth, edited by Emma Goldman and Alexander Berkman. In 1903, inspired by the Christian, anarchist, pacifist message of Tolstoy, Carlos Brandt planned with Tolstoy to have copies of it locally printed in Venezuela.

== Criticism ==
According to literary critic David Holbrook, like many of Tolstoy's other works, he advocates for sexual abstinence here, claiming that sex can "exhaust and debilitate" people. He is criticized elsewhere for sexist attitudes here, where Tolstoy says that it's deplorable to see a woman "capable of bearing children at men's work."

== See also ==
- Bibliography of Leo Tolstoy
