= Elmer Lee =

American physician and activist (1856–1945)

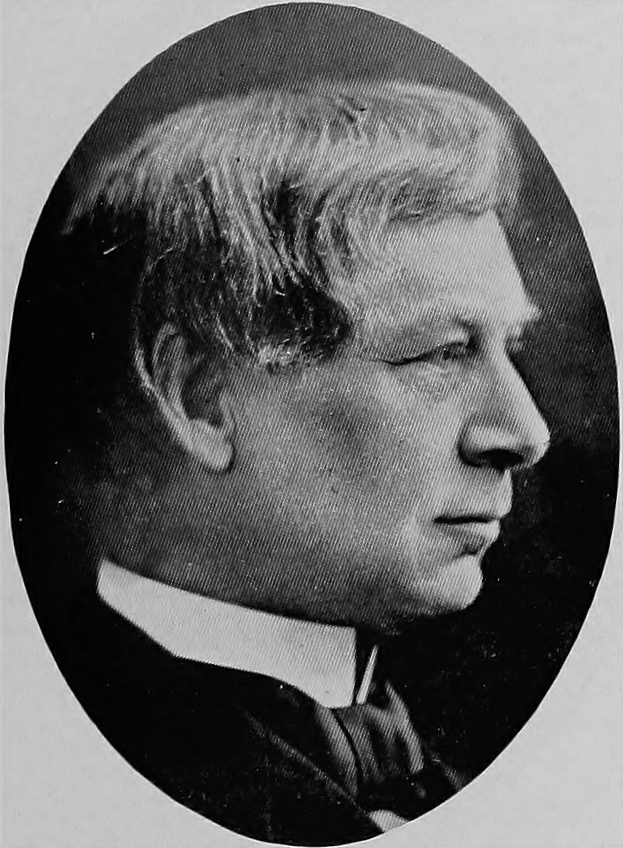
- Portrait from Empire State Notables, 1914
- Born: March 12, 1856; Piqua, Ohio, U.S.
- Died: June 13, 1945 (aged 89); College Hill, Cincinnati, Ohio, U.S.
- Education: Ohio Wesleyan University (A.B., 1877; A.M., 1880); Missouri Medical College (M.D., 1880); Saint Louis University (PhD, 1886)
- Occupations: Physician; magazine editor; activist
- Known for: Natural hygiene and vegetarianism advocacy
- Notable work: Health Culture

Elmer Lee (March 12, 1856 – June 13, 1945) was an American physician, magazine editor, and advocate of natural hygiene and vegetarianism. He founded and edited the health magazine Health Culture, which promoted diet reform and plant-based foods. Lee also worked as a naturopath, wrote on disease treatment and diet, patented a liquid-soap dispenser, and promoted what he called the "hygienic system".

== Biography ==
=== Early life and education ===
Elmer Lee was born in Ohio in 1856. He graduated from Ohio Wesleyan University with an A.B. in 1877 and received an A.M. in 1880. He then moved to St Louis, where he taught in public schools and worked in newspapers.

Lee earned his M.D. from the Missouri Medical College, now the Washington University School of Medicine, in 1880, and his PhD from Saint Louis University in 1886. He then moved to Chicago, where he lived for ten years. Lee studied cholera in Germany and Russia, living for a time in Saint Petersburg.

=== Career ===
Lee founded the health magazine Health Culture in 1894. The magazine promoted a plant-based diet. Lee edited it for 23 years, before being succeeded by Arthur Vos. The magazine continued publication until 1964.

Lee moved to New York City in 1898. He was acting Assistant Surgeon in the Spanish–American War. On November 23, 1898, he testified before a commission investigating conduct in the war. In 1902, Lee patented a reservoir for dispensing liquid soap.

In 1908, Lee wrote an article in The New York Times proposing a "Hospital of Hygiene". He began working as a naturopath in 1910 and developed a health movement known as the "hygienic system", influenced by Russell Trall.

=== Diet advocacy ===
In 1910, The New York Times published an article titled "Dr. Lee pleads for better foods", in which Lee advocated a diet of "live organic plant-foods" and claimed that social problems, including drunkenness, resulted from inadequate nutrition. John Davis has described this article as the first known use of the phrase "plant-foods" to describe a vegetarian diet.

In 1910, Lee reprinted Rupert H. Wheldon's No Animal Food and Nutrition and Diet with Vegetable Recipes, an early British vegan recipe book. The edition included a statement by Lee that a "Plant diet with butter, cream, milk, cheese, eggs, lard, fat, suet, or tallow added to it, is not vegetarian; it is mixed diet; the same in effect as if meat were used." Around 1921, Lee developed a plant milk made from oats and peanut meal.

Lee served as vice-president of the American Academy of Medicine and held offices in the American Medical Association and the American Social Science Association. He was on the advisory committee of the American Super-Race Foundation and worked as a lecturer for the New York Board of Education.

=== Later life and death ===
Lee retired around 1935 and donated his medical books to Ohio Wesleyan University. He died at Cincinnati Sanitarium in College Hill, Cincinnati, on June 13, 1945.

== Selected publications ==
- Lee, E. (February 26, 1891). "Hydro-therapeutic Principles in the Treatment of Typhoid Fever". Medical Record. 53 (9). New York.
- Lee, E. (September 1894). "The Treatment of Typhoid Fever". The American Journal of Dental Science. 28 (5): 223–228. PMC 6115018. PMID 30757396.
- Lee, E. (October 1895). "Treatment of Asiatic Cholera". The American Journal of Dental Science. 29 (6): 250–258. PMC 6118763. PMID 30757708.
- Lee, Elmer (August 1896). "Diphtheria and its Antitoxin". The Laryngoscope. 1 (2): 105–106. doi:10.1288/00005537-189608000-00011. S2CID 221920462.
- Lee, Elmer (February 24, 1900). "Food and Drink" (PDF). JAMA: The Journal of the American Medical Association. XXXIV (8): 465. doi:10.1001/jama.1900.24610080017001g. ISSN 0098-7484.

== Gallery ==
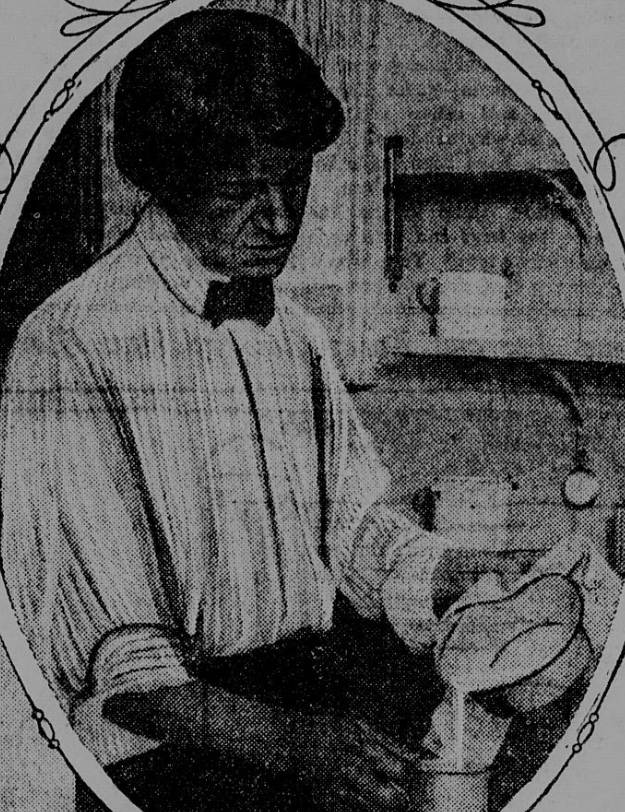
Lee in his laboratory making plant milk from chopped oats, ground peanuts, and water

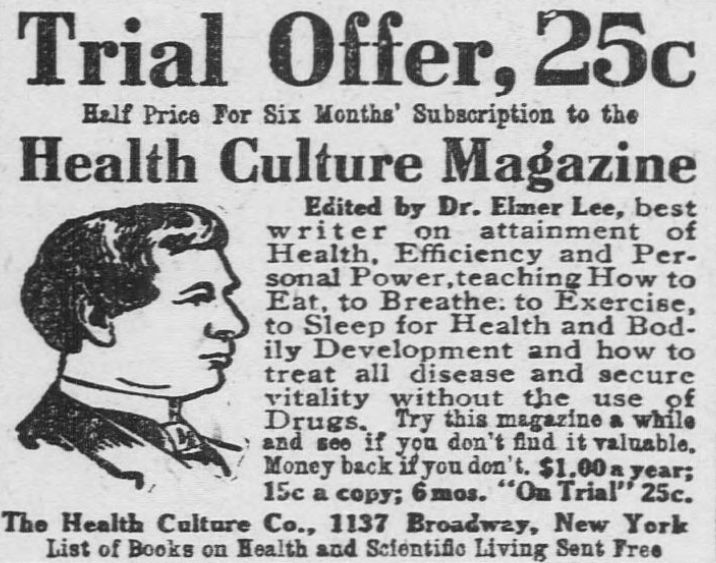
Advert for Lee's Health Culture magazine

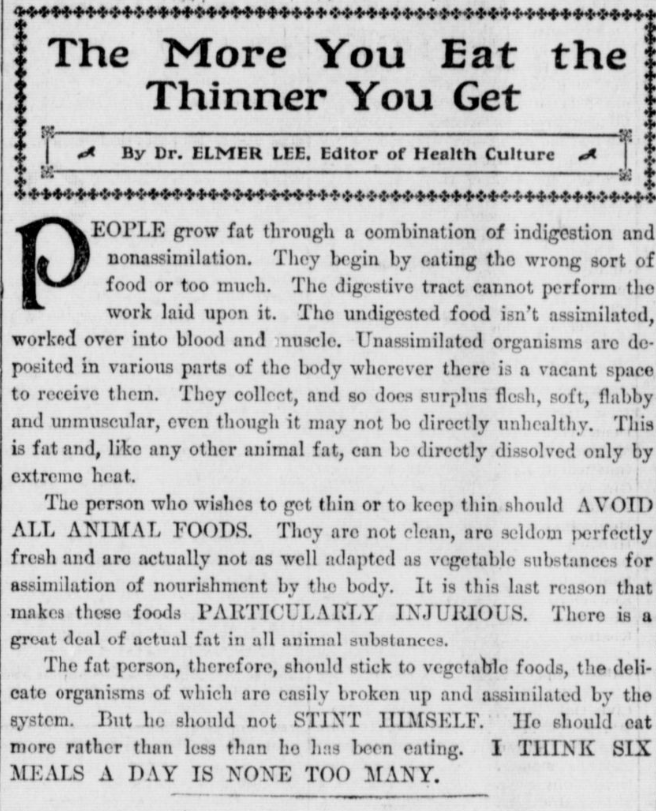
Lee promoting a vegan diet in 1911
