= Arnulfo Briceño =

Colombian musician, songwriter, and lawyer

- Born: Arnulfo Briceño Contreras; 26 June 1938; Villa Sucre, Norte de Santander, Colombia
- Died: 11 June 1989 (aged 50) Tame, Colombia
- Genres: Música llanera
- Years active: 1950s–1989

Arnulfo Briceño Contreras (Note: In this Spanish name, the first or paternal surname is Briceño and the second or maternal family name is Contreras.) (1938–1989) was a Colombian musician, songwriter, and lawyer. Briceño is considered a master of the Colombian genre of música llanera. His composition "Ay Mi Llanura" was made the official anthem of Meta in 1979.

== Biography ==
=== Early life ===
Briceño was born on 26 June 1938 in Villa Sucre, in the Colombian department of Norte de Santander, to Pedro José Briceño and Solina Contreras. He grew up in poverty with nine siblings, and went to primary school in Cúcuta.

=== Early music career ===
As a child, Briceño performed on the radio show Buscando Estrellas on station La Voz del Norte for 3 years, and at the end was given a guitar. In 1951 Alfredo Gutiérrez arrived in Cúcuta for treatment of his father's cancer, and Briceño and Gutiérrez formed the duo Los Pequeños Vallenatos, playing guacharaca and accordion respectively. The pair performed in Venezuela, Ecuador, and Peru. Eventually Briceño began playing guitar, and José Castillo took over on guacharaca. As a trio they toured various cities in Western Venezuela.

Los Pequeños Vallenatos broke up when Gutiérrez's father won money in a lottery, and Briceño moved back to Cúcuta where he enrolled at Liceo San Antonio to finish his secondary schooling. He sold newspapers at the same time to make a living. In Briceño's second year of secondary school, Gutiérrez also returned, and they formed a conjunto with Alfonso and Ernesto Hernández, Víctor Gutiérrez, Gustavo Amava, and Adonaí Díaz. The conjunto moved to Bucaramanga and then in 1953 to Bogotá, where they played alternately with Bovea y sus Vallenatos on a radio show for the station Nueva Granada. Later they moved to Caracas, where they performed on a TV show hosted by Renny Ottolina. Lastly they went to Guayaquil, where they recorded a single for label Onix, with "El Desengaño" by Briceño on the A-side, and a B-side of "El Cóndor" by José Barros.

=== Later music career and university studies ===
In 1958 Briceño married Oliva Vera and they moved to Cúcuta, where Briceño formed the Trío Hispano with Daniel Cáceres and Andrés Santander. In December 1963, Briceño graduated from high school. He then moved to Bogotá and enrolled to study law at the Universidad Libre de Colombia; to pay for his fees he worked as a taxi driver. In Bogotá, Briceño joined Marco Rayo's group Los Vlamers as guitarist and singer. They performed on the TV and radio and in 1966 travelled to Ecuador, Peru, and Mexico. In Mexico the group recorded an LP for Musart, which included the hit "La Quinceañera" that was written by Briceño.

In 1967 Briceño returned to Colombia and won the Villavicencio Festival de la Canción Colombiana with the song "Ay Mi Llanura". In 1973 he graduated as a lawyer from the Universidad Libre de Colombia. He went on to study music pedagogy at National Pedagogic University, graduating in 1981 with a specialisation in choral music. Briceño composed the choral mass "Misa para Coros en Sol Mayor" that was performed during Pope John Paul II's trip to Colombia in July 1986. He also wrote the soundtracks of the Colombian film Canaguaro and telenovela Hato Canaguay.

=== Personal life and death ===
On 19 September 1958, Briceño married Oliva Vera in Bucaramanga. Together they had 7 children: Rafael Antonio, Luz Stella, Elizabeth, Arnulfo, Emmanuel, Juan Francisco, and Daniel. Briceño also had 2 children, Ricardo and Catalina, with singer Zulma Gómez.

Briceño died along with 5 others on 11 June 1989 when the AeroTACA flight he was on crashed 25 kilometres from Tame.

== Musical style and compositions ==
Briceño wrote over 300 songs in various styles including cumbia, joropo, merengue, bambuco, and ranchera. His best known song is "Ay Mi Llanura", which was made the official anthem of Meta in 1979. Other notable compositions of his include the bambucos "A Quién Engañas, Abuelo" and "Verdaderamente Te Quiero", the pasillo "Siempre Mujer", and the joropos "Canta Llano", "Evocando al Jilguero", "Sierra de la Macarena", "Llanerita", "Sabanalarga", and "Adiós a Mi Llano".
