= Orquesta Caraqueña =

Music group in Venezuela

The Orquesta Caraqueña was a light music group led by composer and arranger Pedro Elías Gutiérrez which was based in Caracas, the capital city of Venezuela.

This group, created in the chamber music concept, played waltz, polka and other couple dances in the Venezuelan aristocratic ballrooms of the 1910s and 1920s, and also was one of the recording pioneers artists coming from Venezuela.

The instrumentation consisted of three violins, flute, two clarinets, harp, two cornets, baritone horn, tuba, two cuatros and two traps, and the group's repertoire was entirely instrumental.

Following is the list of tunes recorded by the Orquesta Caraqueña for Victor label on January 31, 1917. The recording session took place in Caracas and the technical process was held in New York.

| Matrix | Title | Composer |
| G-1817 | Emilia | P. E. Gutiérrez |
| G-1818 | Alma llanera | P. E. Gutiérrez |
| G-1819 | Crisantemos | P. E. Gutiérrez |
| G-1820 | Celajes | P. E. Gutiérrez |
| G-1821 | Caricari | P. E. Gutiérrez |
| K-1822 | Sans souci | P. E. Gutiérrez |
| G-1823 | Tardes del Tacarigua | P. E. Gutiérrez |

== See also ==
- Alma llanera
- Caraqueño

== Sources ==
- Enciclopedia de la Música en Venezuela / Directores José Peñín y Walter Guido, Tomo 1, pag. 706–710. Publisher: Caracas, Fundación Bigott, 1998. ISBN 9789806428027
