= Venezuelan bambuco =

Musical genre

Venezuelan Bambuco
- Stylistic origins: Habanera, bambuco
- Cultural origins: 19th and 20th century Andean region of Colombia
- Typical instruments: Piano, bass, guitar, mandolin, flute, cuatro, tiple, violin

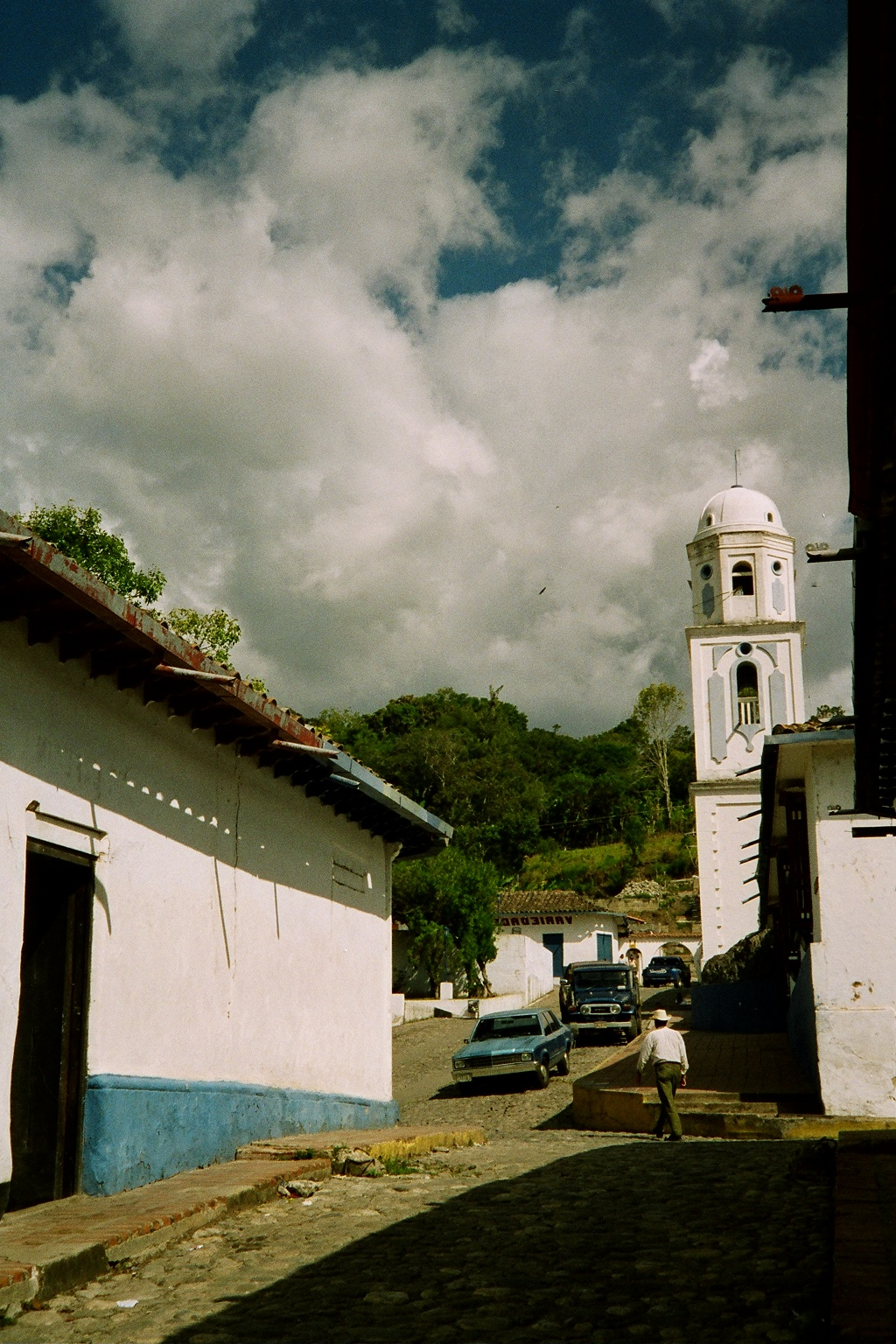
Typical town of the Venezuelan Andes

The Venezuelan bambuco is a musical genre native to the Colombian Andes that became popular in Venezuela after the colonial period. It is typical of the Andean region of Venezuela and is also found in the States of Zulia, Bolívar, Lara, and in the Capital District (Caracas). The instruments typically used are piano, bass, and guitar, and sometimes mandolin and flute. Venezuelan bambuco is typically played in a 5/8 meter.

Characteristic pieces include: "Mañanitas Navidenas" by Marco Antonio Useche, "Brisas del Torbes" by Luis Felipe Ramón y Rivera, “Tu Partida” by Augusto Brandt, “Serenata” by Manuel Enrique Perez Diaz and “Hendrina” by Napoleón Lucena.

== See also ==
- Venezuelan music
- Bambuco

== Sources ==
- Atlas de Tradiciones de Venezuela, Fundación Bigott, 1998, and SACVEN.
