= Heraclio Fernández =

Venezuelan musician

- Born: 1851; Maracaibo, Venezuela
- Died: 1886 (aged 34–35); La Guaira, Venezuela

Heraclio Fernández Noya (1851–1886) was a Venezuelan musician, best known for the composition El Diablo Suelto.

Heraclio Fernández Noya was born in Maracaibo in 1851 but spent his childhood in La Guaira, where he lived with his father, Manuel María Fernández, from whom he received his first piano lessons. In both his hometown and La Guaira, he taught piano lessons. In Caracas, he founded the newspaper El Zancudo, a weekly publication whose first issue was released on January 9, 1876. On October 10, 1884, he launched the biweekly magazine El Museo, which featured works by prominent composers of the time, as well as satirical and humorous musical-literary pieces. Fernández often signed these works with the pseudonym "El Zancudo."

In the magazine El Museo, on San José's day in 1888, "El diablo suelto" was released, a joropeado waltz composed by Heraclio Fernández, whose score was located and published by "the world's first guitarist", Alirio Díaz and later by José Peñín, editor and director of the Spanish and Hispano-American Music Dictionary and the Encyclopedia of Music in Venezuela. About Heraclio Fernandez and his ability as a pianist was read in the newspaper El Zancudo: "He played the piano with exquisite feeling and composed pieces of living room that lovers of good music kept as a model of rhythms and forms."

The only copy of his work "New method to learn to accompany the piano" is preserved in the National Library, and in it and other printed materials of his authorship gives advice and opinions of interpretation and character on how the piano was played at the end of the nineteenth century. Pieces such as "Misa a dos voces", the waltzes "Echoes of the heart", "The variations on the araguato", "Happy New Year", "To General Francisco Alcántara" and the dances "La juguetona", "Violetas sensivas", "Do not forget me" and "Recuerdos del teatro Naar" are part of the richest Venezuelan music collection, which nowadays travels the world, in particular, in the notes of "El diablo suelto" by Heraclio Fernández.
