= Eastern Joropo =

Eastern Joropo (Spanish: Joropo Oriental), is a variant of joropo present in Venezuela's Caribbean coast and Margarita Island.

The joropo oriental musical form may consist of a particular repeated, cyclical, rhythmic-harmonic sequence with the name of golpe." It can also take the two-part form of an opening section with fixed melodies (or a traditional golpe) repeated twice or more, followed by a more open-ended, improvisatory estribillo section. The lead melody instrument is most often the bandola oriental (bandolín), but a button accordion, a violin, or a harmonica might play this role as well. The bandola oriental differs from the bandola llanera, in its four double courses of mixed metal and nylon strings, in contrast with the bandola llanera's four single-course nylon strings. Also, its more linear melodies differ from the bandola llanera's frequent alternation between strings. The cuatro, considered to be the Venezuelan national instrument, provides rhythmic and chordal framework for the music. Joropo oriental playing style, however, is distinguished by its generous use of rasgueado texturing of the rhythm, in which the right hand opens as the fingers stroke the strings, creating more of a sustained, finger-roll sound than a crisp strike. Maraca playing style differs in Oriente from that of the plains, with different hand patterns producing a more lyrical rhythmic sound.
