= Rupert H. Wheldon =

American photographer and activist (1883–1960)

- Born: Rupert Henry Wheldon; July 3, 1883; Philadelphia, U.S.
- Died: June 6, 1960 (aged 76); Salinas, California, U.S.
- Occupations: Photographer, activist
- Spouse: Anna M. Wheldon

Rupert Henry Wheldon (July 3, 1883 – June 6, 1960) was an American photographer and veganism activist.

== Biography ==
Wheldon was born in Philadelphia to Henry David Wheldon and Marianne Wilson. He moved to England as a small child, where he spent most of his life. Wheldon married Anna M. Wheldon and had five stepchildren. He worked as a photographer in Petaluma from 1926 to 1942; he was the proprietor of Sunset Studios located at 23 Western Avenue.

Wheldon's book No Animal Food, published by C. W. Daniel in 1910 and by Health Culture Co. the same year, is often cited as the first vegan cookbook. However, Asenath Nicholson had authored the first vegan cookbook, Kitchen Philosophy for Vegetarians, in 1849. Wheldon's book contains a hundred vegan recipes and eschews animal foods for "ethical, aesthetic, and economic reasons." It was positively reviewed in the Vegetarian Society's The Vegetarian Messenger and Health Review, but was largely forgotten, causing Fay K. Henderson's Vegan Recipes in 1946 to be erroneously cited as the first vegan cookbook.

In the final months of his life, Wheldon moved to Salinas, California, where he ran a health food store. Following a short illness, he died on June 6, 1960, in a Salinas hospital.

== Selected publications ==
- Vegetarianism Versus Carnivorism (Theosophical Quarterly, 1909)
- No Animal Food (Health Culture Co., 1910)
