= Francisco de Paula Aguirre =

Venezuelan composer (1875–1939)

- Born: October 20, 1875; Caracas, Venezuela
- Died: 1939
- Occupation: Composer

Francisco de Paula Aguirre (October 20, 1875 – 1939) was a Venezuelan composer. He wrote many popular waltzes; his most important works include "Claveles de Galipán", "Que bellas son las flores", "Dama Antañona" and the joropo "Amalia". He died in 1939.

== See also ==
- Venezuela
- Venezuelan music
