= Venezuelan waltz =

Illustration of the 19th century, that invites to the Caracas carnival, and a waltz competition

The Venezuelan waltz is a hall dance and accompanying musical genre that was popularized in 19th-century Venezuela. Federico Villena is considered as the father of the Venezuelan Waltz, which changed the European waltz in form, and by adding African and local rhythms.

The two main types of waltz were the hall waltz and the popular waltz. The former was typically performed on piano. Key musicians in this genre were Federico Vollmer, Manuel Azpúrua, Manuel Guadalajara, Rafael Isaza, Heraclio Fernández, Rogelio Caraballo, Francisco de Paula Aguirre, Ramon Delgado Palacios, Laudelino Mejías and Antonio Lauro.

The popular waltz was performed on traditional regional instruments, often the violin and the bandola accompanied by guitar, tiple and cuatro. Most popular waltzes had anonymous composers.

== List of Venezuelan waltzes (partial) ==
- "Dama antañona" (Francisco de Paula Aguirre)
- "El Diablo Suelto" (Heraclio Fernández)
- "Visión porteña" (Pedro Pablo Caldera)
- "Adios, a Ocumare" (Angel María Landaeta)
- "Conticinio" (Laudelino Mejías)
- "Teresita" (Teresa Carreño)
- "Ansiedad" (Chelique Sarabia)
- "Besos en mis sueños" (Augusto Brandt)
- "Que bellas son las flores" (Francisco de Paula Aguirre)
- "Sombras en los médanos" (Rafael Sánchez López)
- "Quejas del alma" (Dr. Delgado Briceño)
- "Flor de loto" (Francisco J. Marciales)
- "Pluma y lira" (Telésforo Jaimes)
- "Brisas del Zulia" (Amable Espina)
- "Morir es nacer" (Rafael Andrade)
- "María Luisa" (Antonio Lauro)
- "Linda merideña" (Pedro José Castellanos)
- "El campo está florido" (Telésforo Jaimes)
- "Las bellas noches de Maiquetía" (Pedro Areila Aponte)
- "La Ruperta" (anonymous)
- "Pablera" (Juan Ramón Barrios)
- "Vals Nº 3 -Natalia-" (Antonio Lauro)
- "Primavera "(Teresa Carreño)
- "Geranio" (Pedro Elías Gutiérrez)

== See also ==
- Venezuelan music
- Joropo

== Sources ==
- Atlas de Tradiciones de Venezuela, Fundación Bigott, 1998.
