= Lorenzo Herrera =

- Born: August 2, 1896; Caracas, Venezuela
- Died: January 21, 1960 (aged 63) Caracas, Venezuela
- Genres: Venezuelan folk music
- Occupations: Musician, singer, composer
- Instrument: guitar

Lorenzo Esteban Herrera (August 2, 1896 – January 21, 1960) was a Venezuelan singer and composer of the first half of the 20th century.

== Sources ==
- Based on Guillermo Ramos Flamerich's reporting about the life of Lorenzo Herrera
