= Alma Llanera =

1914 Venezuelan song

Instrumental fraction of Alma Llanera.

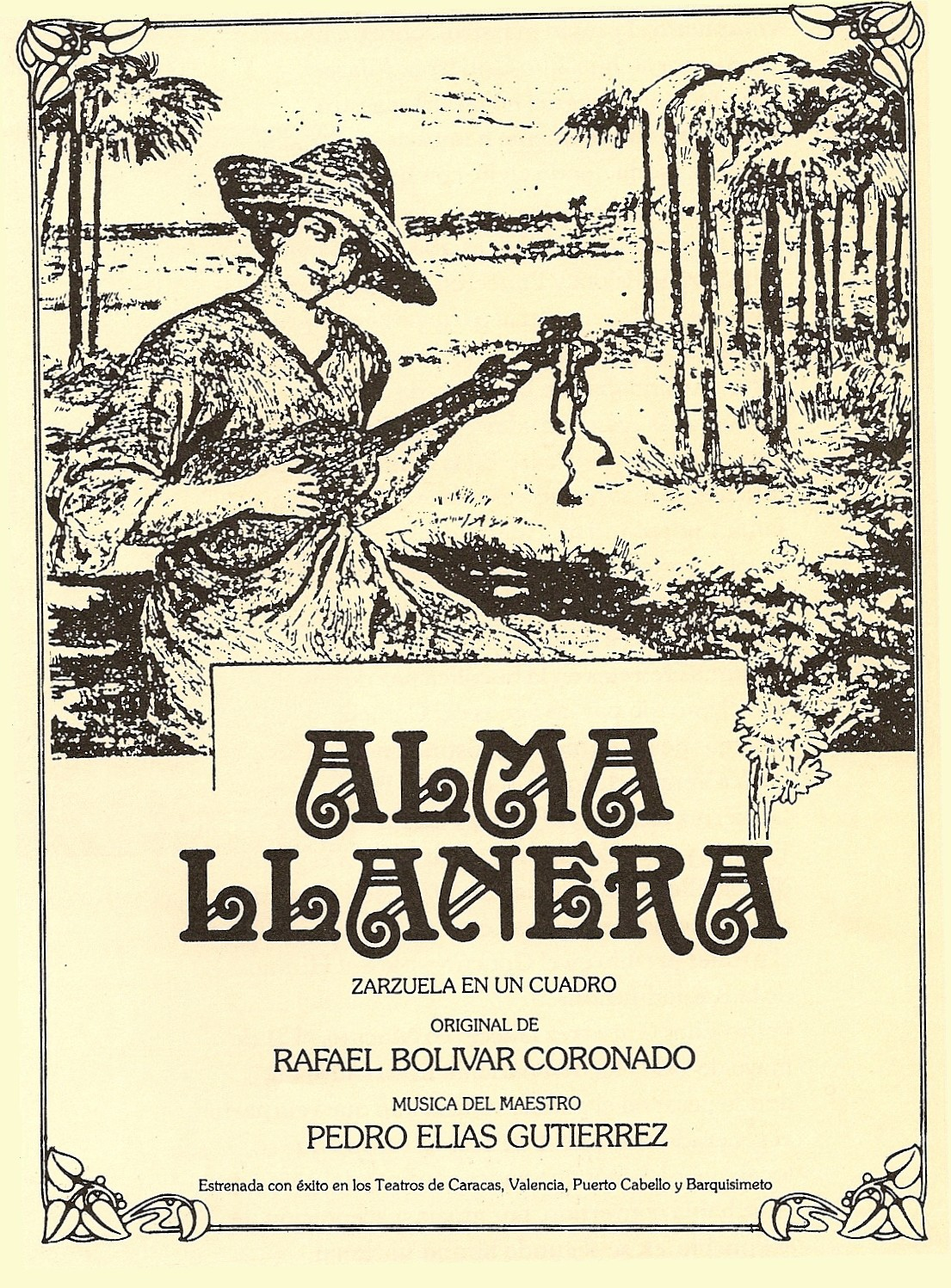
Cover of the first edition of Alma Llanera, unofficial second national anthem of Venezuela

"Alma Llanera" ("Soul of the Plains") is a Venezuelan song, a joropo, created by Venezuelan musicians Pedro Elías Gutiérrez (composer) and Rafael Bolívar Coronado (lyricist). It was originally part of a zarzuela whose premiere was on September 19, 1914, at the Teatro Caracas. Alma Llanera has since come to be considered as Venezuela's unofficial second national anthem. Its hundredth anniversary was marked by its being declared Bien de Interés Cultural.

== Song ==
The first part of Alma Llanera is inspired on the waltz Marisela by composer Sebastian Díaz Peña from Venezuela, while the second part of Alma Llanera is taken from the second part of the waltz Mita by the Curaçaoan composer Jan Gerard Palm (1831-1906). The title refers to the Llaneros, the herders of Venezuela whose culture is part of the country’s popular imagery. The llanero culture is at the root of the joropo, firstly as a dance and then as a musical genre.

It is a tradition in Venezuela to include "Alma Llanera" in national patriotic events, which is why it is considered the country's second anthem.

== Notable performances ==
The Venezuela Symphony Orchestra (OSV) made an arrangement of this piece of music to commemorate the 75 years of this widely popular song. Today, Alma Llanera is considered as a Latin America landmark song and has been performed by many famous singers all over the world such as the Spanish tenor, Plácido Domingo, and Mexican ranchera legend, Jorge Negrete.

The song was performed by Danny Ocean during the 2025 Nobel Peace Prize ceremony awarded to María Corina Machado.

== Lyrics ==
The original lyrics of the Alma Llanera are as follows:

Yo nací en esta ribera
del Arauca vibrador,
soy hermano de la espuma,
de las garzas, de las rosas,
soy hermano de la espuma,
de las garzas, de las rosas
y del sol, y del sol.

Me arrulló la viva Diana
de la brisa en el palmar,
y por eso tengo el alma
como el alma primorosa,
y por eso tengo el alma
como el alma primorosa
del cristal, del cristal.

Amo, lloro, canto, sueño
con claveles de pasión,
con claveles de pasión.
Amo, lloro, canto, sueño
para ornar las rubias crines
del potro de mi amador.

Yo nací en esta ribera
del Arauca vibrador,
soy hermana de la espuma,
de las garzas, de las rosas
y del sol.

A translation:

I was born in this bank
of the vibrating Arauca River,
I am brother of its foam,
of the herons, of the roses,
I am brother of its foam,
of the herons, of the roses
and the sun, and the sun.

I was lulled by the vivid reveille
of the breeze in the palm grove,
and so I have the soul
like the exquisite soul,
and so I have the soul
like the exquisite soul
of the crystal, of the crystal.

I love, I weep, I sing, I dream
with carnations of passion,
with carnations of passion.
I love, I weep, I sing, I dream
to adorn the blonde mane
of my lover's colt.

I was born in this bank
of the vibrating Arauca River,
I am brother of its foam,
of the herons, of the roses
and the sun.

== See also ==
- Orquesta Caraqueña
