= Augusto Brandt =

Venezuelan musician (1892–1942)

Augusto Brandt (1892 in Puerto Cabello – 1942 in Caracas) was a Venezuelan composer and violinist.

== Early life ==
The son of German immigrants, and younger brother of writer Carlos Brandt, he had piano lessons with Ana Jhan Wittestone as a child, and composed his first pieces at the age of six. From 1903, he studied violin in Caracas. In the municipal theatre of his town, in 1910, he composed a triumphal march for the centenary of the independence of Venezuela.

== Career ==
With a scholarship of 60 bolivares from the Puerto Cabello local government official Lopez Bello, on December 23, 1909, he went to Belgium. There, he was a pupil of César Thomson at the Brussels Conservatory, from which he graduated with first prize in the violin. He then lived in New York City, where he was first violinist of the orchestra at the Paramount Theater. Later, he joined the orchestra of the radio station WOR. Here, he initially served as first violinist, and later as a solo violinist and conductor.

== Later life ==
After the death of the dictator Juan Vicente Gómez, Brandt returned to Venezuela, where he and his brother Carlos Brandt, earned prestige due to their commitment to human rights.

== Works ==
- Jesús aplaca la tormenta, 1898
- Marcha Triunfal, 1910
- Joropo en Concierto - for Violin
- Preludio for piano en fa menor
- Himno Panamericano, 1934
- Marcha Solemne
- Bolívar en el Panteón
- Dulce Ensueño
- Recuerdos de mi Tierra, waltz
- Canción de Cuna, waltz
- Tu partida, waltz
- Nocturne, waltz
- Desfile Militar, march
- Himno Bolivariano
- Súplica, waltz
- El adiós de las gaviotas, waltz
- Besos en mis sueños, waltz
- Adiós a las Gaviotas, Sonata-Fantasia - for Piano
