= Pedro Elías Gutiérrez =

Venezuelan musician (1870–1954)

- Born: March 14, 1870; La Guaira, United States of Venezuela
- Died: May 31, 1954 (aged 84); Macuto, Vargas Departament, Federal District, Venezuela
- Known for: Writing Alma Llanera

a

Pedro Elías Gutiérrez (March 14, 1870–May 31, 1954) was a Venezuelan musician who is mainly remembered for the song Alma Llanera, whose music he composed for the zarzuela of the same name.

Gutiérrez also led the Orquesta Caraqueña, directed the Caracas Martial Band (Banda Marcial Caracas) from 1903 to 1946, and wrote several other zarzuelas, including Percance en Macuto and Un Gallero como Pocos. He died in Macuto, Vargas.

== Alma Llanera ==
The song is a joropo, a Venezuelan dance form. The lyrics were written by Rafael Bolivar Coronado and it is regarded as the unofficial second National anthem of Venezuela. The first part of Alma Llanera is inspired on the waltz Marisela by composer Sebastian Díaz Peña from Venezuela, while the second part of Alma Llanera is inspired on the waltz Mita by the Curaçaon composer Jan Gerard Palm.
