= Joropo =

Folk music genre from Colombia and Venezuela

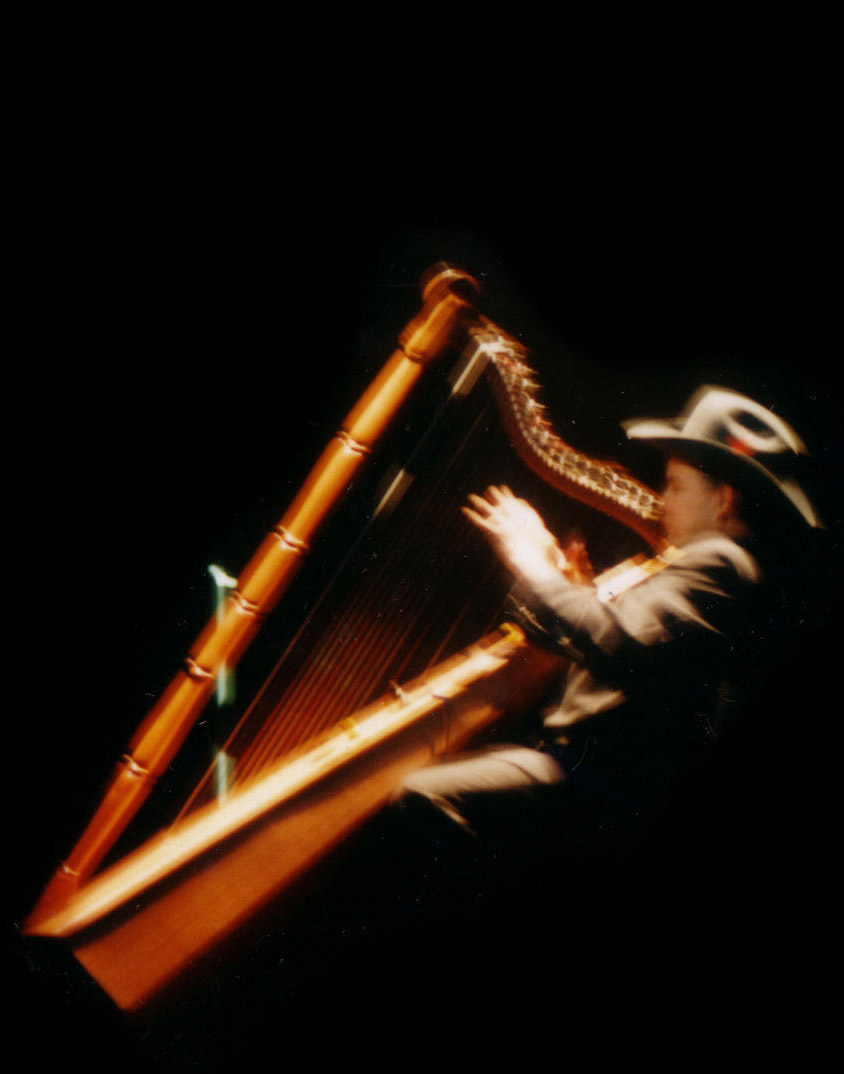
- Instrumental excerpt of Alma Llanera, considered the second national anthem of Venezuela.
- Stylistic origins: Arabic melismatic music, cante jondo, Spanish folklore
- Cultural origins: 18th century, Llanos region of Colombia Venezuela
- Typical instruments: Harp, cuatro venezolano, capachos or maracas, bandola, mandolin, tiple, bandolón, guitar and guacharaca

Subgenres
- Romantic Joropo, Creole Joropo, Alternative Joropo

Joropo in Venezuela
- UNESCO Intangible Cultural Heritage
- Country: Venezuela
- Reference: 02092
- Region: Latin America and the Caribbean

Inscription history
- Inscription: 2025 (20th session)
- List: Representative

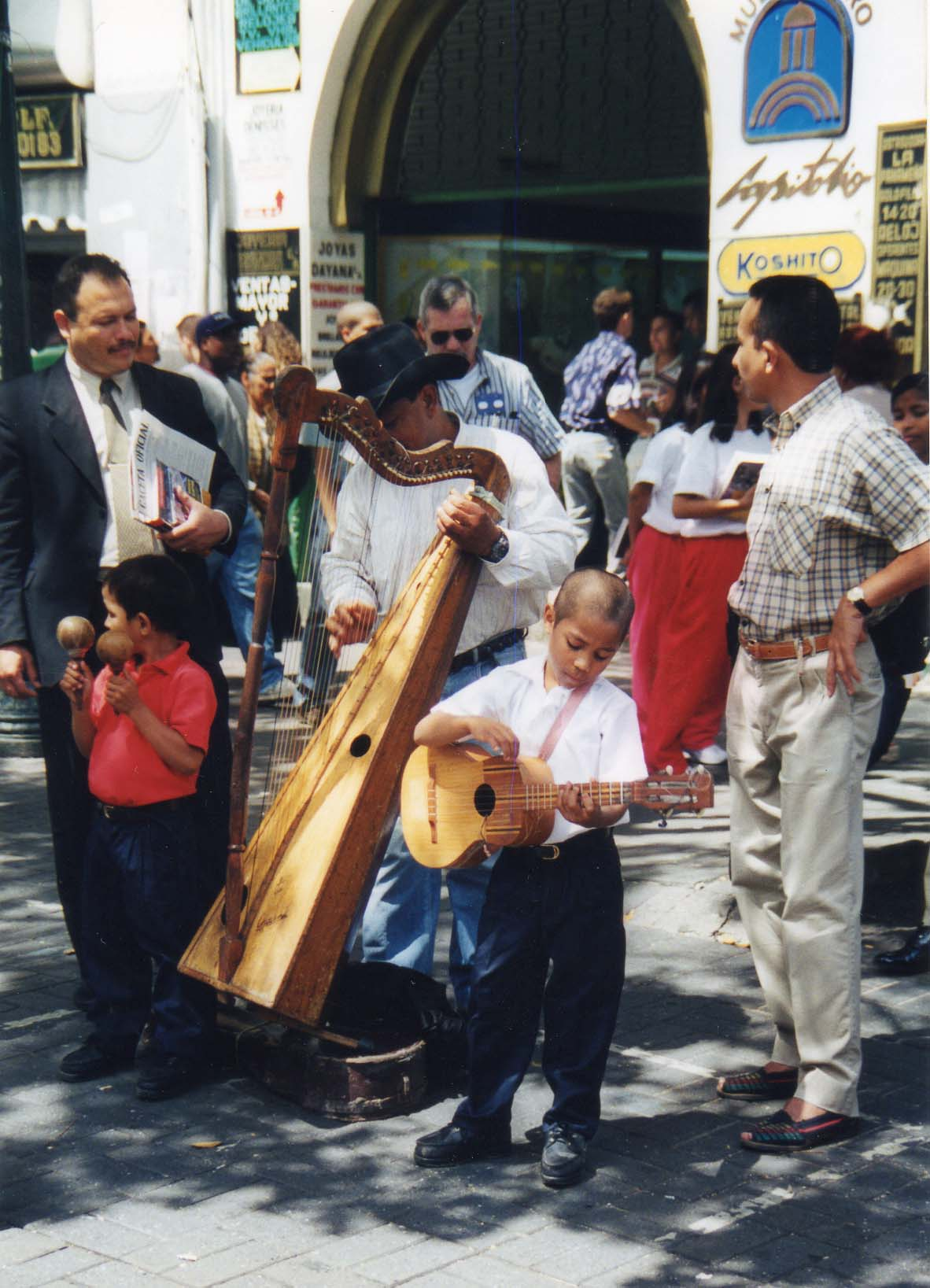
Street musicians in Caracas play joropo on the Venezuelan arpa

The joropo, or Música Llanera, is a musical style resembling the fandango, and an accompanying dance. It originated in the Llanos of Colombia and Venezuela 300 years ago and it has African, European and Native South American influences. There are different joropo variants: tuyero, oriental, and llanero. It is a fundamental genre of Venezuelan música criolla. It is also the most popular "folk rhythm": the well-known song "Alma Llanera" is a joropo by Pedro Elias Gutierrez, considered the unofficial national anthem of Venezuela. Also, the song “Ay Mi Llanura” by Arnulfo Briceño is considered the most representative of Colombia.

In 1882 it became Venezuela's national dance and music. Formerly, the Spanish word joropo meant "a party", but now it has come to mean a type of music and dance that identifies Venezuelans. In the 18th century, the llaneros started using the word joropo instead of fandango, which was used at the time for party and dance.

In 2025, UNESCO inscribed Venezuelan joropo on the Representative List of the Intangible Cultural Heritage of Humanity.

== Venezuela ==
=== Tuyero ===
Central joropo (Spanish: joropo central) is also known as tuyero ("Tuyan"), joropo tuyero ("Tuyan joropo") or golpe tuyero ("Tuyan beat").

Characteristic of the central states of Venezuela, like Aragua and Miranda, eastern Carabobo and northern Guárico, central joropo, or tuyero (as practiced in the Valles del Tuy along the Tuy River) is sung accompanied by harp (arpa tuyera, sometimes replaced by guitar) and maracas. Unlike the nylon strings of the llanera harp, the central joropo harp also uses metal strings, which gave its unique sound. The central joropo singer also plays the maracas and dances, requiring just two performers: the harpist, and the singer-maraquero. Joropo harpists prefer the name "arpisto" rather than arpista, the usual Spanish word for "harpist". The central joropo him the same considerations are applied around the passage and hit burrowing joropo, except speed, which is slightly lower. Another important distinction is that the central joropo revuelta consists of a chain of musical sections of fixed forms, in the same tone as a Baroque suite, without interruption, but with surprising twists. The movements of the revuelta are called passage; input or call Yaguazo, Yaguazo, and Marisela Guabina input. Sometimes they can call Marisela added to them, and even a small coda. The revuelta is thus equivalent to the batch or shift dance, and its length is probably the reason for its gradual decline in use, being replaced by the execution of the parts in isolation. The arrangement of these sections is of sequential nature, unlike golpes of Llanero joropo, having a cyclic condition. The most characteristic part of tuyero joropo, the Tuyera Revuelta consists of four sections: the exhibition (passage), development (yaguazo and guabina), the instrumental coda named Marisela, and an end known as "monkey call." They are central joropo own beats flowers and quitapesares. The most famous passages tuyeros are The Hermit Mario Diaz, Dawn tuyero of Cipriano Moreno and Pablo Hidalgo, and El gato enmochilado (Cat in a bag) by Fulgencio Aquino. Caraqueños and central musicians adopted central joropo as inspiration for their works, as in the case of Marisela (Sebastián Díaz Peña), the Alma Llanera (Pedro Elias Gutierrez), the waltz Quitapesares (Carlos Bonet) and even Creole Sonatina of Juan Bautista Plaza. Central joropo lyrics are of a sly, sardonic nature, in contrast to the forceful and violent own burrowing joropo, whose contrapunteos (counterpoints) end up not infrequently in sets and fights.

The most characteristic of tuyero folklore piece, "The Tuyero Revolt" ("Revuelta tuyera"), consists of four sections: the exhibition (passage), development (yaguaso and guabina), the instrumental coda ("Marisela") and an end known as "the call monkey". The most famous tuyero passages are "El ermitaño" of Mario Diaz, "Amanecer tuyero" of Cipriano Moreno and Pablo Hidalgo, and "El gato enmochilado" of Fulgencio Aquino.

=== Eastern joropo ===
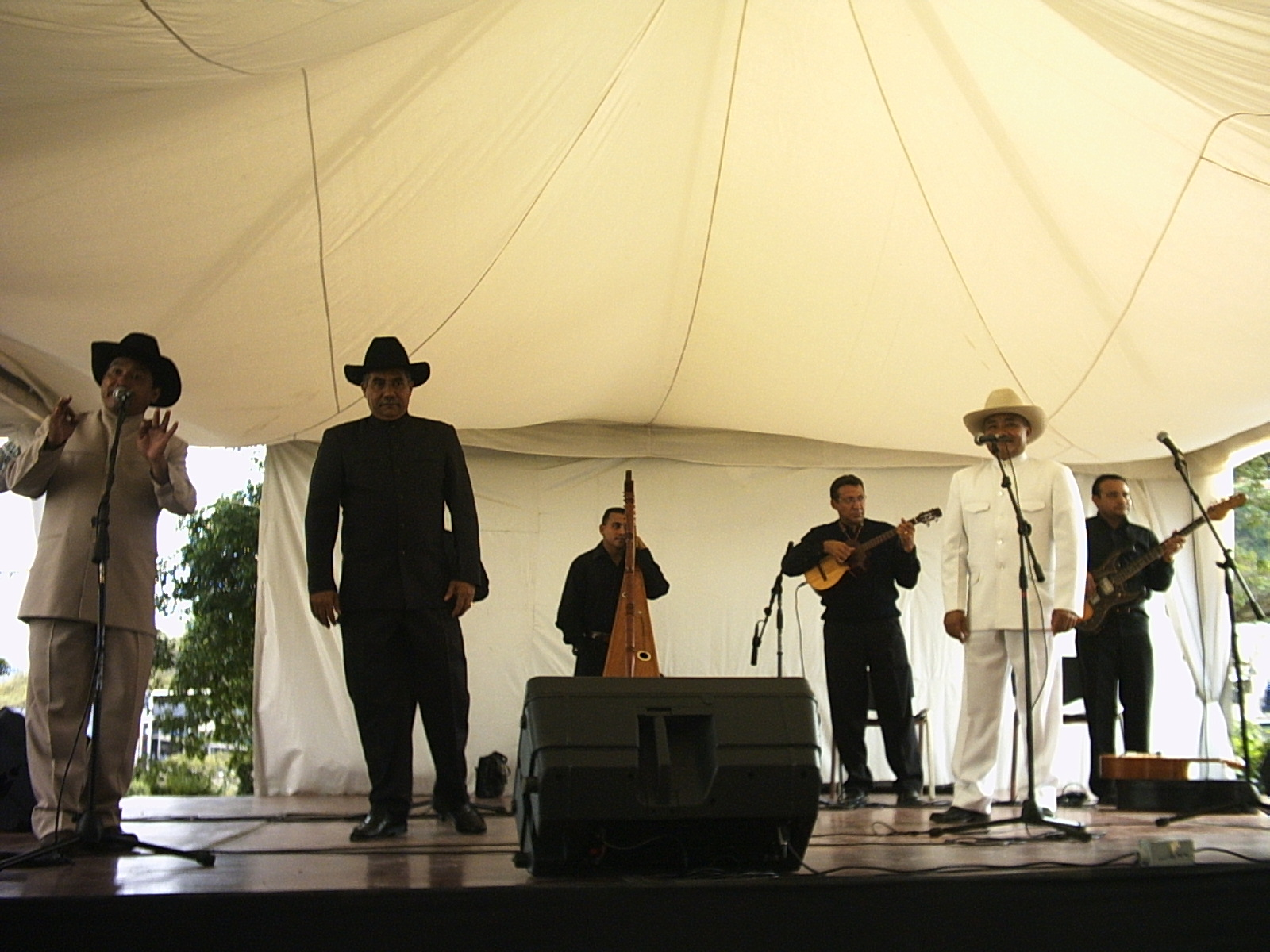
Interpretation of joropo in Caracas, Venezuela

Characteristic of the northeastern region of Venezuela, specifically of Sucre, Nueva Esparta and the north of Anzoátegui and Monagas states. In this particular type of joropo, the melodic instrument par excellence is the mandolin. However, the eastern mandolin (eight nylon strings), violin, harmonica and a small accordion called "cuereta" also have a major role in the oriental musical folklore. The so-called "joropo with refrain" consists of two sections: the first section or "hit" is traditionally a fixed melody in 3/4 rhythm that is repeated two or more times; the second section or "chorus" is an improvised melody over a fixed harmonic rhythm cycle is 6/8. Note that in the eastern joropo, cuatro and maracas are executed in a much freer and more complex than in the rest of Venezuelans joropos way. Likewise, it is important to mention that the musical tradition of the eastern region of Venezuela has many other forms besides the eastern joropo.

=== Guayanés joropo ===
Joropo in the Venezuelan region of Guayana is the product of the interaction of llaneros and eastern Bolivar state, specifically in Ciudad Bolívar. It is executed with the Guayanese mandolin (eight metal strings), cuatro and maracas. The Seis Guayanés, the Josa and Rompeluto highlight among the most famous Guyanese joropos.

=== Golpe tocuyano or larense joropo ===
Hailing from the West Central region of Venezuela, mainly the states of Lara, Portuguesa (Sierra de Portuguesa) and Yaracuy. Played by a variety of stringed instruments (Four, Middle Five, Five and Six) together with Tambora and maracas produce a very particular and unique sound among other Venezuelan joropos. Popular tocuyano hits include "Amalia Rosa", "Montilla", "Gavilan Tocuyano" and "Ah mundo! Barquisimeto", "Los Dos Gavilanes", "El Espanto", "Pajarillo Tocuyano", "Garrote Encabullao", and "Fuego Fuego", among many others. Dancing in the number of members is six couples.

=== Quirpa ===
Legend says that this type of joropo is named after Jose Antonio Oquendo, who was nicknamed "Quirpa" . Burrowing harpist of the late nineteenth century who died of a stab wound. The quirpa uses ternary and tertiary bars and sometimes combined, with shifts of rhythm and musical accents .

=== Joropo llanero ===
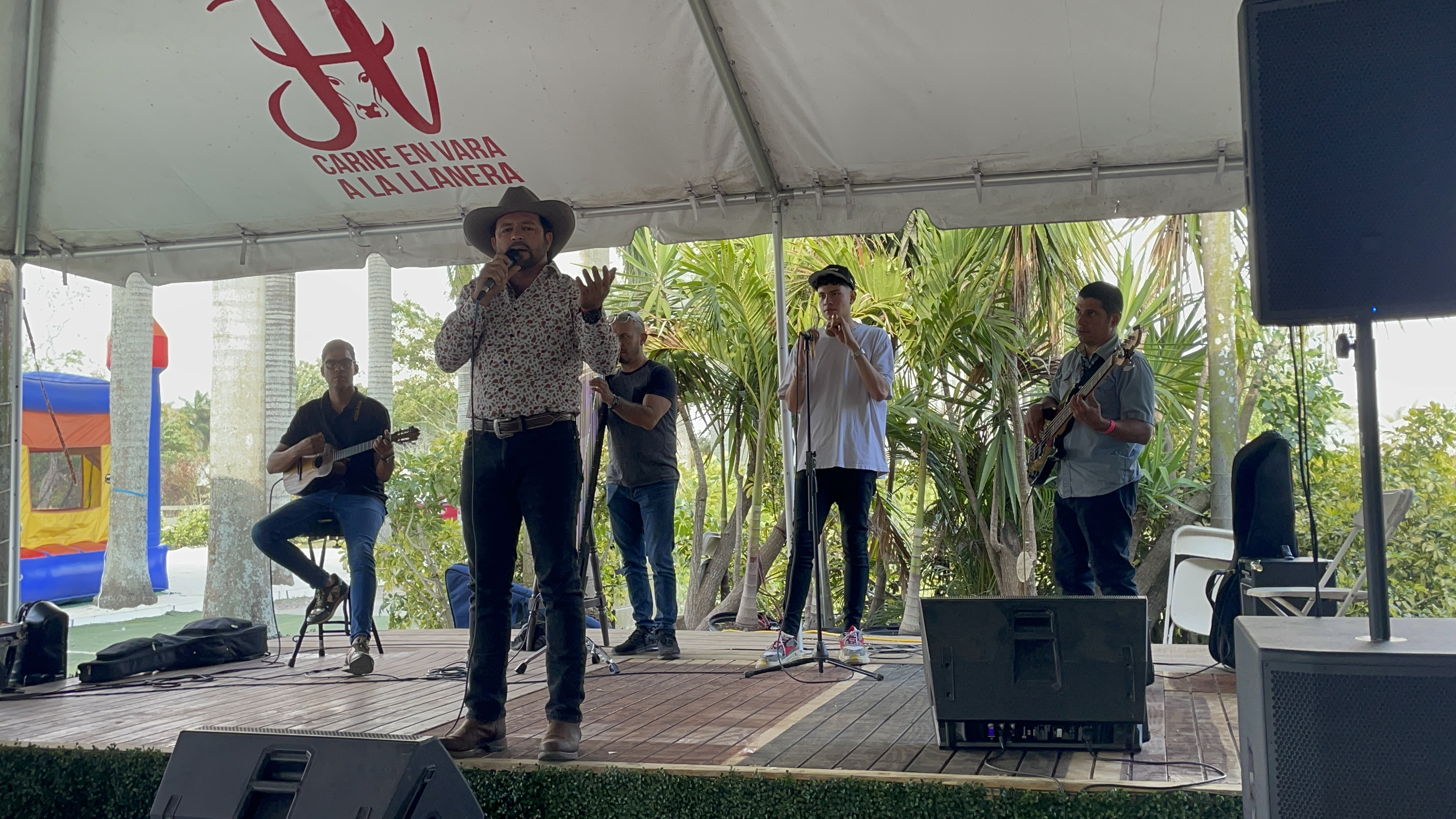
Joropo presentation in Miami, Florida, United States

Until the mid-twentieth century, and with regard to the region of the plains of Venezuela, the joropo word referring to a social event almost a fair- for a period that could vary from a few hours and even a full week. There participating local people or coming from various places, generally attracted by trade, where the central event it was the music, dance and contrapunteos. Burrowing joropo music was provided by a basic set consisting of Bandola, cuatro, maracas and singing. If there was no bandola, it could be replaced by a llanera harp, mandolin or violin. The genera of burrowing joropo are two: Passage: the more sedate, and generally known author. Its speed is approximately 152 bpm, and harmonic structure free, usually in two parts; Y Hit:. Anonymous author, although many of these strokes are attributed to composers of the early twentieth century The coup complies with certain recognizable melodic turns on fixed characteristic harmonic patterns that define its type. Singing is syllabic, that is, to each note of the melody corresponds to a syllable. The verses are octosyllabic and sometimes five syllables, all under contrafactum, ie the replacement of new texts in existing melodies. The stroke speed is greater than the passage (176–192 bpm). When the song is a story of an event or fantasy called the RAN, equivalent to the old Spanish romance. The blows are the basis for the buzzes or hums contrapunteo that between two or more opponents. The most common are the six law (major key), the bird (in a minor key), six numbering or six numerao (with transport augmentations in fourth grade), the Kirpa or quirpa, Gavan (in modes major and minor), the San Rafael, carnival, Chipola, the catira, the buzz buzzing, among the best known. The entreverao is the aggregation of two strokes, with a modulation of each other, usually to sing two people with different tessitura voice (baritone and tenor). As for the steps of the most frequent dance are valsiao, escobillao and footwork, in which, unlike the central joropo, feet off the floor rise. Family tree of performers llanera harp in Venezuela since the late nineteenth century to the present

== Colombia ==
=== Llanos orientales ===
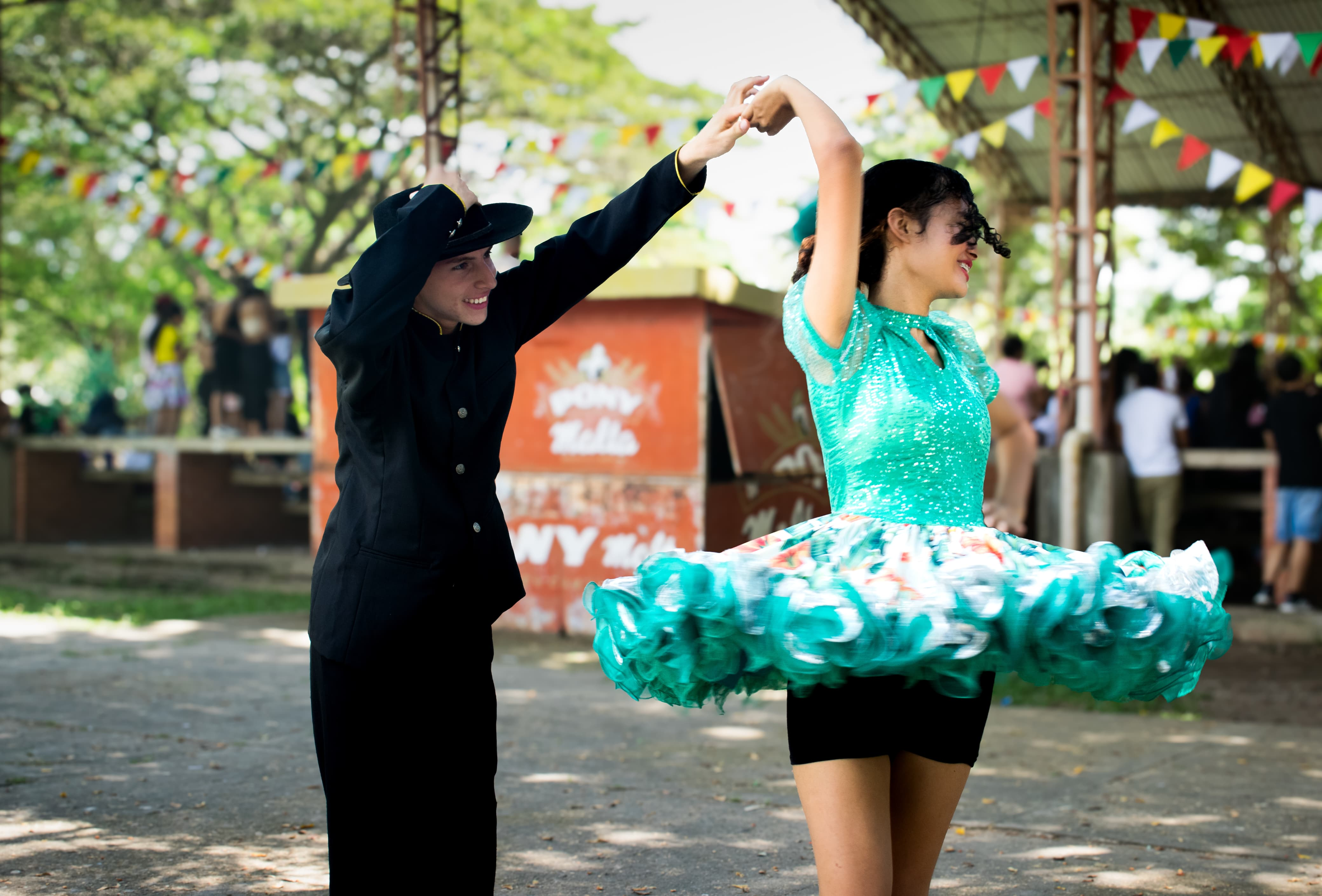
In Colombia's joropo dance, female dancers wear short skirts with brightly colored prints and lace.

The joropo is the representative musical genre and traditional dance of the Orinoquía region of Colombia, primarily practiced in the departments of Meta, Casanare, Arauca, and Vichada. Characterized by its fast-paced, it is performed using a traditional ensemble consisting of the llanera harp, the cuatro (a small four-stringed guitar), and maracas. In some sub-regions, the bandola llanera replaces the harp as the lead melodic instrument. The dance is distinguished by the zapateo (vigorous foot-stomping by the man) and the escobillao (a sweeping foot movement by the woman), symbolizing the gallantry and the rugged nature of the plainsman.

Historically, the joropo emerged from a complex process of transculturation between the 17th and 18th centuries. It traces its roots to Spanish fandangos and Andalusian melodies brought by Jesuit missionaries during the colonial era, which subsequently merged with African rhythmic influences and indigenous sensibilities. Originally, the term "joropo" referred to a festive social gathering or party rather than a specific musical style. Over time, it evolved into a distinct identity within the shared cultural corridor of the Llanos, spanning both Colombia and Venezuela, and transitioning from a rural, domestic celebration to a highly technical performance art.

In contemporary Colombia, the joropo is a pillar of national identity and a symbol of the "Llanero" spirit. It is most prominently heard during major cultural events such as the International Joropo Tournament in Villavicencio or the Araucanidad Day festivities. Beyond its festive role, the genre serves as an oral chronicle of the plains, with lyrics often depicting cattle ranching life, local heroism, and the vast natural landscape. Its relevance was officially recognized by the Colombian government through its declaration as Cultural Heritage of the Nation, ensuring the preservation of its poetic forms, such as the contrapunteo (improvised vocal duels), and its role as a vital link to the country's mestizo heritage.

The Colombian Congress declared joropo as “Cultural Heritage of the Nation” in 2025 and designated May 24 as National Joropo Day.

The song “Ay mi Llanura” by Arnulfo Briceño is the most representative of Colombia and is considered the second anthem of the department of Meta.

== Dancing ==
The Joropo folk dance in Venezuela is seen as a rich musical expression. This dance is greatly cherished and seen as the national dance and symbol of the nation. Joropo's known as an umbrella genre that implements a variety in dance and vocals. Music is a substantive part of Joropo, and till this day, Venezuela is not in opposition to its popularity. Joropo is filled with artists who move between academic and popular music. It is adopted and still uses the hand turn, the movement of the feet, and waltz turns. First, the partners dance a type of waltz holding each other tightly. Then they stand facing each other and make small steps forward and backward as if sweeping the floor. Lastly they hold each other's arms, and the woman does sweeping steps while the man stomps his feet along with the music's rhythm. Joropo is a genre, emerged to represent Venezuela's identity because of its popularity and by how much it was enjoyed across many regions in the nation. The Joropo is played with the bandola or llanera harp (arpa llanera), cuatro, and maracas, making use of polyrhythmic patterns, especially of hemiola, and alternation of 3/4 and 6/8 meters. It was originally played, most often also sung, by the llaneros, the Venezuelan Llanos, (plains), and thus also called música llanera (ibid).

The singer and the harp or bandola may perform the main melody while a cuatro performs the accompaniment, adding its characteristic rhythmic, sharp percussive effect. The cuatro and the bandola are four-stringed instruments which are descendants of the Spanish guitar. The only real percussion instruments used are the maracas. Besides the genre and dance, the name joropo also means the performance, the event or occasion of performance.

== Evolution and more refined forms ==
In modern times, several other instruments have been added to playing various parts in joropo performances, for instance, guitar, flute, clarinet, piano, and up to a complete symphony orchestra playing joropo arrangements.

== See also ==
- Alma Llanera
- Ay Mi Llanura
- Caballo Viejo
- Moliendo Café
- Fandango
- Venezuelan waltz
- Waltz

== Sources ==
- Dydynski, Krzysztof (2004). Lonely Planet Venezuela. ISBN 1-74104-197-X.
