= List of Malaysian patriotic songs =

List of Malaysian patriotic songs

== National ==
- "Negaraku" (National anthem)
- "Jalur Gemilang" (Flag anthem)
- "Malaysiaku Gemilang" ("Glory of My Malaysia" - The Anthem for the 50th Merdeka Day)
- "Perpaduan Teras Kejayaan" ("Unity Is The Core of Success" - The Anthem for the 51st Merdeka Day)
- "Satu Malaysia" ("One Malaysia" - The Anthem for the 52nd Merdeka Day)
- "Malaysiaku Berdaulat Tanah Tumpahnya Darahku" ("My Sovereign Malaysia, My Native Land") - The Anthem for the 56th Merdeka Day)
- "Malaysia, Disini Lahirnya Sebuah Cinta" ("Malaysia, Where the Love Is Born" - The Anthem for the 57th Merdeka Day)
- "Sehati Sejiwa" (The Anthem for the 58th Merdeka Day)
- "Kita Satu Malaysia" ("We Are One Malaysia")
- "Gemilangku Malaysia" ("Malaysia Our Glory")
- "Benderaku" ("Our Flag")
- "Setia Malaysia" (Loyal Malaysia)
- "Keranamu Malaysia" ("For You Malaysia") by Abang Lan
- "Setia" ("Loyal") - by Dato Ahmad Dassilah.
- "Rukun Negara" (Ideology songs)
- "Perajurit Tanah Air" aka "Inilah Barisan Kita" ("This is Our Team")
- "Malaysia Berjaya" ("Malaysia Success")
- "Pahlawanku" ("Our Ranger") - by Siti Nurhaliza
- "Warna-Warna Malaysiaku" - by Siti Nurhaliza
- "Satu Malaysia" ("One Malaysia") - by Siti Nurhaliza
- "Budi Bahasa Budaya Kita" - by Siti Nurhaliza
- "Hati" - by Siti Nurhaliza from the film 1957 Hati Malaya
- "Berkorban Apa Sahaja" ("Do Anything") - by P. Ramlee from the film Hang Tuah
- "Perwira" ("Super") - by Saloma
- "Zapin Malaysia" - by P. Ramlee and Saloma
- "Joget Malaysia" - by P. Ramlee and Saloma
- "Sekapur Sirih Seulas Pinang" - by Saloma
- "Bahtera Merdeka" - by Aishah
- "Bumi Bertuah, Malaysia" - by Jamal Abdillah
- "Namamu Tetap Gemilang" - by Jamal Abdillah
- "Berkorban Apa Sahaja" ("Do Anything") - by Jamal Abdillah from the film Tuah
- "Kau Pergi Demi Pertiwi" - by Jamal Abdillah
- "Takkan Melayu Hilang di Dunia" - by Sharifah Aini
- "Malaysia Indah" - by Khatijah Ibrahim
- "Sejahtera Malaysia"
- "Malaysia Oh Tanahairku " (Malaysia, Oh Our Land")
- "Selamat Pergi Pahlawanku"
- "Bumi Malaysia"
- "Tanggal 31 Ogos" (National day songs) - by Sudirman Arshad
- "Tegakkan Bendera Kita" ("Raise Our Flag") - by Sudirman Arshad
- "Di Bumi Bertuah" - by Sudirman Arshad
- "Warisan" - by Sudirman Arshad
- "Bapak" - by Sudirman Arshad (special tribute to the Father of Independence, Tunku Abdul Rahman Putra Alhaj)
- "Malaysia, Tanah Airku"
- "Malaysia Baru" ("New Malaysia")
- "Bersatu Berdisiplin"
- "Dirgahayu Oh Tanahairku"
- "Kemegahan Negaraku" (Pride of the Nation)
- "Perpaduan Bangsa"
- "Malaysia Berjaya"
- "Tanahairku"
- "Tanah Pusaka"
- "Jaya Diri"
- "Berjaya"
- "Cemerlang, Gemilang, Terbilang"
- "Wawasan 2020" ("Vision 2020")
- "Gagah Perkasa"
- "Si Baju Hijau" ("The Man in Green") - by Carefree
- "Di Medan Ini" - by Awie
- "Tanda" - by Awie
- "Gemilang" - by Ella
- "Standing in the Eyes of the World" - by Ella
- "Redha Kemenangan" - by Amy Search
- "Malaysiaku Tercinta"
- "Sehati Sejiwa Malaysia"
- "Cinta Setia"
- "Permainya Bumi Malaysia"
- "Perjuangan Yang Belum Selesai" - poem songs by Nora
- "Malaysia Boleh!"
- "Kami Anak Malaysia" aka "Proud To Be Malaysian" - both Malay and English version
- "Untukmu Malaysia "For You Malaysia"
- "Mulanya Di Sini" ("It All Starts Here") - by Freedom
- "Here in My Home" - by Malaysian Artists for Unity (MAFU), May 2008. An anti-racism song project preceded 15Malaysia film project.
- "Malaysia Satu" - by Faizal Tahir (Winner of "Our 1 Malaysia Song" competition)
- "Saya Anak Malaysia"
- "Fikirkan Boleh" - by Metropolitan
- "Malaysia Forever" - by Bobby Gimby
- "Luhur" by Kamikaze
- "Bersatu" by Raihan
- "Kita Punya Malaysia" ("This is Our Malaysia") by Bunkface
- "Malaysia Bersih" ("A Clean Malaysia") by Syamel and Ernie Zakri
- "Titiwangsa"

== States ==
=== Johor ===
- "Lagu Bangsa Johor" (State anthem)
- "Tanjung Puteri"
- "Johor Negeriku"
- "Selat Tebrau"
- "Luaskan Kuasamu Oh Johorku"
- "Walinong Sari"
- "Zapin Ya Salam"

=== Kedah ===
- "Allah Selamatkan Sultan Mahkota" (State anthem)
- "Biar Jasa Jadi Kenangan"
- "Kedah Serata-rata"
- "Jelapang Padi Kedah"
- "Mai Cek Oi Mai Cek Mai"

=== Kelantan ===
- "Selamat Sultan" (State anthem)
- "Anok Kelate"
- "E Wa Bule"
- "Gomo Kelate Gomo"
- "Tanah Serendah Sekebun Bunga"
- "Joget Kelantan"

=== Malacca ===
- "Melaka Maju Jaya" (State anthem)
- "Senandung Anak Melaka"
- "Berjuanglah"
- "Dondang Sayang"

=== Negeri Sembilan ===
- "Berkatlah Yang DiPertuan Besar Negeri Sembilan" (State anthem)
- "Anak Nogori"
- "Apo Nak Dikato"
- "Bersama Setia"
- "Dirgahayu Yang di-Pertuan Besar"
- "Joget Negeri Sembilan"
- "Hobin Jang Hobin"
- "Moh Dogheh"
- "Nogori Kito"
- "Pepatah Petitih"

=== Pahang ===
- "Allah Selamatkan Sultan Kami" (State anthem)
- "Pahang"
- "Menghilir di Sungai Pahang"
- "Ale Ale Tok Gajahku"
- "Sejahtera Pahang"
- "Pertiwi Ku Pahang Darul Makmur"
- "Walinong Sari"
- "Joget Pahang"

=== Penang ===
- "Untuk Negeri Kita" (State anthem)
- "Sila Berkunjung Ke Pulau Pinang"
- "Haria Penang Haria"

=== Perak ===
- "Allah Lanjutkan Usia Sultan" (State anthem)
- "Perak Darul Ridzuan" aka "Perak Oh Negeriku"
- "Kejor Yeop Kejor"
- "Kalau Tuan Datang Ke Negeri Teman"

=== Perlis ===
- "Amin amin ya Rabaljalil" (State anthem)
- "Kuala Perlis"
- "Singa Utara"

=== Sabah ===
- "Sabah Tanah Airku" (State anthem)

=== Sarawak ===
- "Ibu Pertiwiku" (State anthem)
- "Sarawak, namamu"
- "Sarawak ke alaf baru"
- "Puteri Santubong"

=== Selangor ===
- "Duli Yang Maha Mulia" (State anthem)
- "Selangor Bergerak Maju"
- "Joget Selangor"
- "Keroncong Selangor"

=== Terengganu ===
- "Lagu Negeri Terengganu" (State anthem)
- "Blues Terengganu Kita"
- "Terengganu Molek Doh!"
- "Terengganu Maju, Impianku"
- "Maju, Berkat, Sejahtera"

== The Federal Territories ==
- "Maju dan Sejahtera" (Territory anthem)

=== Kuala Lumpur ===
- "Selamatkan Kuala Lumpur" (Territory anthem)
- "Kuala Lumpur, Kuala Lumpur"
- "Keroncong Kuala Lumpur" - by P. Ramlee
- "Kuala Lumpur, Ibu Negeri" - by Saloma

=== Labuan ===
- "Labuan Negeriku" (Territory anthem)
