= State anthems of Malaysia =

Malaysia is a federation made up of thirteen states and three federal territories. The states have adopted their own distinct state anthems and a single anthem is shared by the federal territories.

== States ==
Entity	Composition	Adopted	Lyricist(s)	Composer(s)	Audio
Johor	"Lagu Bangsa Johor" ("Song of Johor")	1897	Hj. Mohamed Said Hj. Sulaiman	Mackertich Galistan Abdullah	State Anthem of Johor
Kedah	"Allah Selamatkan Sultan Mahkota" ("God Bless the Crowned Sultan")	1937	Abdullah Syed Hussain Shahabuddin	J. A. Redhill	Allah Selamatkan Sultan Mahkota
Kelantan	"Selamat Sultan" ("Save the Sultan")	1927	Tengku Mahmood Mahyideen	Haji Mohamed bin Mohamed Saaid	Selamat Sultan
Malacca	"Melaka Maju Jaya" ("Successful Malacca")	1974	Collectively	Saiful Bahri; Alias Arshad	Melaka Maju Jaya
Negeri Sembilan	"Berkatlah Yang DiPertuan Besar Negeri Sembilan" ("Bless the Great Lord of Negeri Sembilan")	1911	Tuanku Muhammad	Andrew Caldecott	Berkatlah Yang DiPertuan Besar Negeri Sembilan
Pahang	"Allah Rahmatkan Raja Kami" ("God Bless our King")	1923	Dorothy Lilian Swarder		State Anthem of Pahang
Penang	"Untuk Negeri Kita" ("For Our State")	1972	Awaluddin Zainal Alam		State Anthem of Penang
Perak	"Allah Lanjutkan Usia Sultan" ("God Bless His Majesty, The Sultan")	1901	Sultan Abdullah	Pierre Jean de Beranger	State Anthem of Perak
Perlis	"Amin amin ya Rabaljalil"	1935	Syed Hamzah ibni al-Marhum Syed Safi Jamalullail		State Anthem of Perlis
Sabah	"Sabah Tanah Airku" ("Sabah My Homeland")	1963	Unknown	HB Hermann	Sabah Tanah Airku
Sarawak	"Ibu Pertiwiku" ("My Motherland")	1988	Dato' Haji Wan Othman Ismail Hassan		Ibu Pertiwiku
Selangor	"Duli Yang Maha Mulia"	1967	Unknown	Saiful Bahri	Duli Yang Maha Mulia
Terengganu	"Selamat Sultan" ("Save the Sultan")	1927	Mohamad Hashim bin Abu Bakar		Selamat Sultan

== Federal territories ==
Entity	Composition	Adopted	Lyricist(s)	Composer(s)	Audio
Kuala Lumpur	"Maju dan Sejahtera" ("Peace and Prosperity")	2011	Syed Indera Syed Omar	Suhaimi Mohd Zain	Maju dan Sejahtera
Labuan	"Maju dan Sejahtera" ("Peace and Prosperity")	2011	Syed Indera Syed Omar	Suhaimi Mohd Zain	Maju dan Sejahtera
Putrajaya	"Maju dan Sejahtera" ("Peace and Prosperity")	2011	Syed Indera Syed Omar	Suhaimi Mohd Zain	Maju dan Sejahtera

== See also ==
- National anthem of Malaysia
- List of regional anthems
