= Malaysia Berjaya =

Malaysian national song

Berjaya is a patriotic Malaysian national song. This song was composed by Saiful Bahri Elyas (Saiful Bahri) in a day and performed by Jamaluddin Alias which was given wide air-time play by Radio Televisyen Malaysia (RTM) in the late 1960s and early 1970s. This song is launched on 16 November 1964, by the third Agong, Tuanku Syed Putra ibni Al-Marhum Syed Hassan Jamalullail for the First National Unity Week.

This song is believed to commemorate Malaysia's victory over Indonesia in the Konfrontasi; however, there has never been any confirmation on this.

== Lyrics ==
=== Original songs ===
Malaysia kita sudah berjaya,
Aman makmur bahagia
Malaysia abadi selamanya,
Berjaya dan berjaya!

Berbagai kaum sudah berikrar
Menjunjung cita-cita
Satu bangsa satu bahasa
Malaysia berjaya!

Dari Perlis sampailah ke Sabah
Kita sudah merdeka
Negara makmur rakyat mewah
Kita sudah berjaya!

Dengar semboyan kita berjaya
Gemuruh di angkasa
Satu bangsa satu negara
Malaysia berjaya!

=== English translations ===
Our Malaysia has succeed
Peaceful and radiant
Malaysia forever shall you live
and achieve more success!

The people have pledged
to strive for the aspiration
Of one people, one language
Successful Malaysia!

From Perlis to Sabah
We are now free
A prosperous nation, with affluent people
We have succeed!

With the bugle we sound our success
Shooting for the stars
One people, one nation
Successful Malaysia!

== See also ==
- Malaysia Berjaya MP3
- Malaysia Berjaya (this version has the first "satu bangsa..." as "...satu bahasa")
- Negaraku (National anthem)
- List of Malaysian patriotic songs
