= Teriring Doa =

EP by Sudirman
- Released: 1976
- Recorded: 1976
- Label: Warnada Record
- Producer: Daos

Sudirman chronology
Teriring Doa (1976)	Aku Penghiburmu (1978)

Teriring Doa (Malay for With Prayer) is the debut EP from Sudirman Arshad with Warnada Record after winning the Bintang RTM competition in 1976. This album is also released in the same year as he won the competition. The cover album shows the picture of him with the background of his wife, Kay (now she had become his ex-wife). Besides, the song "Surat Ku Yang Ini" also introducing the dialogue by Fadzillah Hassan that has been created by Din Osman. He once sang the song "Seruling Bamboo" in the Bintang RTM final competition.

== Track listing ==
Side One
No.	Title	Writer(s)	Length
1.	"Teriring Doa"	Ooi Eow Jin, Habsah Hassan	3:18
2.	"Ku Bersilat"	Johari Salleh	2:47

Side Two
No.	Title	Writer(s)	Length
1.	"Surat Ku Yang Ini" (Dialogue: Fadzillah Hassan)	Din Osman, Habsah Hassan	2:51
2.	"Seruling Bamboo"	Copyright Controlled	3:08
