= Kami (1982 film) =

1982 film by Patrick Yeoh

- Film poster
- Directed by: Patrick Yeoh
- Written by: Patrick Teoh; Sudirman Arshad
- Story by: Patrick Teoh
- Produced by: Zain Ibrahim; Zaharan Ibrahim; Aziz Sattar (executive)
- Starring: Sudirman Arshad; Zul Zamanhuri
- Cinematography: Aziz Yusof
- Edited by: Salehan Shamsuddin
- Music by: Kassim Masdor
- Distributed by: Indra Film Sdn Bhd
- Release date: 27 May 1982 (Malaysia)
- Running time: 105 minutes
- Country: Malaysia
- Language: Malay

Kami is a 1982 Malaysian Malay-language drama film. It is notable as being the only film featuring Sudirman Haji Arshad, a successful Malay singer dubbed the "Singing Lawyer" as he was a law graduate from the University of Malaya in Kuala Lumpur (an academic background almost unheard of among Malay entertainers). The film is written and directed by Patrick Yeoh, who was notable as being the first non-Malay in several decades to direct a Malay film.

The film is unusual for its time, not following the conventional Bollywood influenced formula that typified Malay films of the era.

== Plot ==
The film is about two young runaway teenagers who meet in the city of Kuala Lumpur after leaving their respective homes in different states. Tookoo (Sudirman) the elder of the two, who was first in the city, "adopts" Din (Zulzamri) and as their relationship develops, is both big brother and father to Din. As the film unfolds, Tookoo's aspirations of becoming a successful pop singer come into focus, alongside his and Din's daily struggle to survive in the city by collecting recyclable items to sell. The audience is moved by the challenges these two teenagers face in the urban landscape. They endure harassment from gangs that steal their hard-earned money, deceitful employers who refuse to pay them, and the distress of overzealous police mistakenly arresting Tookoo.

== Response ==
The film was panned by a generation of Malay film reviewers accustomed to the typical Malay film format. However, three out of four established film critics in the country voted it the best film of the year in Malaysia in 1983. The film represented Malaysia at two international film festivals. Zulzamri who played the character of Din won the Best Child Actor Award at the Malaysian National Film Festival.

== Cast ==
- Sudirman Arshad as Tookoo
- Zul Zamanhuri as Din
- Osman Zailani as Tookoo's father
- Ho Kwee Leng as Tookoo's stepmother
- Ibrahim Din as Mamak
- Shariff Babu as Pak Du
- Azmi Mohamad as Abang Husin
- Azizah Muslim
- Norhayati Yaacob
- Param Andhi
- Balakrishnan Andhi
- Ganesh Munusamy

== Songs ==
- Budak Baru - Sudirman Arshad
- Pelangi Petang - Sudirman Arshad
- Kesepian - Sudirman Arshad

== Media release ==
Kami was reaired on Radio Televisyen Malaysia (RTM) TV2 on 22 May 2009. It also aired on Astro Citra.
