= Kampung Balai =

Coordinates: 6.1015°N 102.373°E

Kampung Balai is a village in Bachok, Kelantan, Malaysia. It is located approximately 20 kilometers southeast of Kota Bharu.

== Origin of Name ==
While ‘’Balai’’ means ‘’hall’’ in Malay, there is no known historical correlation between the village and ‘’hall’’.

However, according to local inhabitants, “Balai” is derived from ‘’Ban Malai” or ‘’flower village’’ in Thai language. It is believed that the low-lying area where the rice field was, now planted with tobacco, was once a shallow lake filled with flowering lotus.

== History ==
The Thais of this village are believed to be originated from central Thailand more than 200 years ago when Kelantan was a tributary of the Kingdom of Siam. Their spoken Thai language is distinctly different from other Thais in Kelantan who generally speak the southern “Tak Bai" Thai language.

The village was most probably opened by these Thais or the Chinese.

The Chinese, mostly from Fujian, China came to the village probably at the same time with the Thais to develop the village. Some of the Chinese are of eighth or ninth generation descendants. Virtually all of them have lost contact with their ancestral roots in China.

== Demographics ==
The population of Balai is about 450, almost all of them are of Thai and Chinese descents.

The lingua franca among the villagers is mainly Thai although all the Chinese and most of the Thais could also speak, to some degree of competency, Kelantan Hokkien (Min Nan). All of them are fluent Malay speakers and some, especially the younger generation, could converse in Mandarin as well.

They are predominantly Buddhists. The Chinese also observe traditional Chinese practices.

== Places of interest ==
There are three Buddhist temples in the village i.e. Wat Phathumviharn, Wat Phithikyan Phutthaktham and a Kuan Yin temple located at seaside facing the South China Sea.
