= Tanggal 31 Ogos =

Malaysian patriotic and national song

Song
- Genre: Malaysian anthem
- Songwriter: Ahmad C.B.

Tanggal 31 Ogos ("The Date of 31st of August") is a Malaysian patriotic and national song. It is sung during the National Day celebrations throughout the nation. This song was popularised by Sudirman. The lyrics were originally written and sung by Ahmad C.B., a singer-songwriter from Medan, Indonesia. The refrain in the song, "Merdeka! Merdeka!" refers to independence.

== Lyrics ==
Malay

𝄆 Tanggal tiga puluh satu
Bulan lapan lima puluh tujuh
Merdeka, Merdeka
Tetaplah merdeka
Ia pasti menjadi sejarah

Tanggal tiga puluh satu
Bulan lapan lima puluh tujuh
Hari yang mulia
Hari bahagia
Sambut dengan jiwa yang merdeka

Mari kita seluruh warganegara
Ramai-ramai menyambut hari merdeka
Merdeka!
Tiga satu bulan lapan lima puluh tujuh
Hari mulia, negaraku (Note: Originally bangsaku (my people)) merdeka 𝄇

Mari kita seluruh warganegara
Ramai-ramai menyambut hari merdeka
Merdeka
Tiga satu bulan lapan lima puluh tujuh
Hari mulia negaraku merdeka

Merdeka, Merdeka, Merdeka......

Merdeka!

IPA (Note: See Help:IPA/Malay.)

𝄆 [taŋ.gal ti.ga pu.luh sa.tu]
[bu.lan la.pan li.ma pu.luh tu.d͡ʒuh]
[mər.de.ka mər.de.ka]
[tə.tap.lah mər.de.ka]
[i.a pas.ti mən.d͡ʒa.di sə.d͡ʒa.rah]

[taŋ.gal ti.ga pu.luh sa.tu]
[bu.lan la.pan li.ma pu.luh tu.d͡ʒuh]
[ha.ri jaŋ mu.li.a]
[ha.ri ba.ha.gi.a]
[sam.but də.ŋan d͡ʒi.wa jaŋ mər.de.ka]

[ma.ri ki.ta sə.lu.ruh war.ga.nə.ga.ra]
[ra.mai̯ ra.mai̯ mə.ɲam.but ha.ri mər.de.ka]
[mər.de.ka]
[ti.ga sa.tu bu.lan la.pan li.ma pu.luh tu.d͡ʒuh]
[ha.ri mu.li‿a nə.ga.ra.ku mər.de.ka] 𝄇

[ma.ri ki.ta sə.lu.ruh war.ga.nə.ga.ra]
[ra.mai̯ ra.mai̯ mə.ɲam.but ha.ri mər.de.ka]
[mər.de.ka]
[ti.ga sa.tu bu.lan la.pan li.ma pu.luh tu.d͡ʒuh]
[ha.ri mu.li‿a nə.ga.ra.ku mər.de.ka]

[mər.de.ka mər.de.ka mər.de.ka]

[mər.de.ka]

English

𝄆 On the date of the thirty-first day,
Of the eighth month of '57,
Independent, independent,
And it shall stay independent,
It will certainly become history.

On the date of the thirty-first day,
Of the eighth month of 1957,
It is a glorious day,
A day of happiness,
Celebrated by free lives.

Let us, all the citizens,
Together celebrate Independence Day.
Independence!
31st August, 1957,
This glorious day, when my nation is free! 𝄇

Let us, all the citizens,
Together celebrate Independence Day.
Independence!
31st August, 1957,
This glorious day, when my nation is free!

Independence, Independence, Independence ...

Independence!

== See also ==
- Tanggal 31 mp3
- Negaraku (National anthem)
- Tegakkan Bendera Kita
- List of Malaysian patriotic songs
