= Perajurit Tanah Air =

Malaysian patriotic song

"Perajurit Tanah Air" ("Soldiers of the Motherland"), also known by its incipit "Inilah Barisan Kita" ("Here We Are Standing United"), is a Malaysian patriotic song composed by Indonesian musician Saiful Bahri, who composed various state songs of Malaysia. The song extols soldiers' readiness to fight and die.

The song found renewed popularity among Malaysians in the wake of the 2013 Lahad Datu standoff and the COVID-19 pandemic as a song dedicated to the frontliners. It is also sung by Ultras Malaya supporters of the Malaysian national football team.

== Lyrics ==
Malay original

Inilah barisan kita,
Yang ikhlas berjuang.
Siap sedia berkorban,
Untuk ibu pertiwi!

Sebelum kita berjaya,
Jangan harap kami pulang!
Inilah sumpah pendekar kita,
Menuju medan bakti!

Andai kata kami gugur semua,
Taburlah bunga di atas pusara.
Kami mohon doa,
Malaysia berjaya!

Semboyan telah berbunyi,
Menuju medan bakti!

Chinese version

請看吧！我保國衛家
在激烈戰鬥裡
血染犧牲我不遲疑
親愛地祖國大地！

誓保護我們的家園
勿盼望我們的歸來
這就是我們宣誓的使命
為勝利勇敢前進！

倘若黎明前我們捐驅沙場
請將鮮花拋撒在我墓上
我們祈求上蒼
馬來西亞更輝煌！

號角聲燃起我勇氣
為勝利勇敢前進！

English translation

Here we are standing united,
We are willing to fight,
Brave and ready to sacrifice,
For our nation's liberty!

And before victory is called,
We shall never be returned home!
This is our true oath, as true warriors,
March on to the battlefield!

If we all fall while in the line of battle,
We ask you to place flowers on our graves,
And to God we all pray,
Malaysia will prevail!

And the war signal is calling,
March on to the battlefield!
