= Tegakkan Bendera Kita =

Tegakkan Bendera Kita is a Malaysian patriotic and national song. It was played by Sudirman Arshad on 1982.

== Lyrics ==
Hormatilah bendera kita
Ia lambang negara
Bersatu padu kita dibawahnya
Hidup berkeluarga

Putih merah biru kuning
Warna bendera kita
Berkibar-kibar megah
Di angkasa
Kemegahan semua

Tegakkan bendera kita

=== English translations ===
Honor our flag
It's the nation emblem
We united under it
Living as a family

White red blue yellow
The color of our flag
Proudly streaming
In heaven (In the air)
Pride of all (of us)

Raise our flag

== See also ==
- Negaraku (National anthem)
- Jalur Gemilang
- Tanggal 31 Ogos
- List of Malaysian patriotic songs
