= Flag and coat of arms of Kelantan =

Symbols of the Malaysian state

The flag and the coat of arms of Kelantan are state symbols of Kelantan, Malaysia. Like the flag of Kedah, the Kelantanese flag is red with a single charge from Kelantan's coat of arms, albeit partially.

Similar to other states of Malaysia with Malay royalties, both the flag and arms of Kelantan are influenced by Kelantanese royalties, Islam, and political and natural symbols of the state.

== Flag ==
Kelantan کلنتن
- Use: Civil and state flag
- Proportion: 1:2
- Adopted: 1924
- Design: A red field defaced with a white crescent and star and two white kris and spears.

Adopted in 1924, the Kelantanese flag consists of only a red field with a white charge in the centre derived from its state coat of arms, consisting of the arm's crescent, five pointed star, dual spears and unsheathed krises. The red represents the honesty of Kelantan's settlers, citizens and king (the Sultan of Kelantan), while the charge signifies the sanctity of the Sultan of Kelantan.

=== History ===
Between 1912 and 1923, Kelantan adopted a significantly different flag design, which encompasses a white flag with a blue border enveloping the top, fly, and hoist of the flag, and Jawi scriptures stylised as a canine or a feline. The tip of the tail is interpreted as "Kerajaan Kelantan" (denoting the Kelantanese government), while the main body of the animal-based scripture contains two passages from the Qur'an, an excerpt of the 13th ayat of the 61st surah, the Al-Saf:

وَأُخْرَىٰ تُحِبُّونَهَا ۖ نَصْرٌ مِّنَ اللَّهِ وَفَتْحٌ قَرِيبٌ ۗ وَبَشِّرِ الْمُؤْمِنِينَ
Pertolongan dari Allah dan kemenangan yang dekat. Dan sampaikanlah berita gembira ini kepada orang-orang yang beriman. / Help from Allah and a speedy victory. So give the glad tidings to the believers.

Following the abolishment of the 1912-1923 flag and the adoption of the new red-and-white flag in 1924, the charge of the new flag was given minor refinements over time. Between 1928 and 1932, accounts of the flag were made indicating the charge's heraldic elements was more closely similar to that of the arms. While white, the charge sported more intricate details in the interior, and the points of the star are connected to their opposite corners by red lines. These details are since removed, contributing to a more silhouetted appearance of the charge.

Sultanate of Kelantan, 1912–1923

=== Variants ===
==== Royal Standards ====
The royal family of Kelantan flies a series of flags for its respectable members. High-ranking members are designated their own flags, while others are grouped to fly any one of three flags. The flags vary by design but are typically designed as either a plain flag or a flag with a quarter-length hoist.

Royal standard	Dates	Use	Details
	2010–present	Royal standard of the Sultan	The Arms of the Sultan of Kelantan on two equal horizontal bands of white and red.
	pre 2010	Royal standard of the Sultan	A white flag with the royal arms in blue (a blue star and upward pointing crescent surmounted by a coronet similar to that from the arms, surrounded by a blue wreath) charged on the centre; an older, more intricate variant of the flag features a yellow star and crescent, a yellow crown, and a blue wreath.
	present	Royal standard of the Raja Perempuan	A yellow flag with the royal arms in blue charged in the centre.
	present	Royal standard of the Crown Prince	A white flag with a yellow hoist measuring an estimated one quarter of the flag's length, with a blue star and crescent (a simplified variant of the royal arms) charged on the fly.
	present	Royal standard of the Crown Princess	A yellow flag with a white hoist, with a blue star and crescent (a simplified variant of the royal arms) charged on the fly.
	present	Royal standard of the Representative of the Sultan	A horizontal bicolor of yellow and red with a white equilateral triangle based at the hoist containing the royal arms in blue at its centre.
	2010–present	Royal standard of the Regent	A white flag with the Arms of the Regent of Kelantan, and a red bordure.
	pre 2010	Royal standard of the Regent	A horizontally divided white-over-red flag with the royal arms in blue charged on the centre.
	present	Royal standard of the Tengku Bendahara	A blue flag with a yellow hoist, with a white crescent and star and two white kris and spears charged on the fly.
	present	Royal standard of the Tengku Temenggong	A red flag with a yellow hoist, with a white crescent and star and two white kris and spears charged on the fly.
	present	Flag of the Royal Family Members with Portfolio	A yellow-purple per bend divided flag with a white crescent and star and two white kris and spears in the bottom right.
	present	Flag of the Royal Family Members without Portfolio	A yellow-purple per bend divided flag.
	present	Flag of the Non-Ministerial Royal Family Members	A purple flag with a yellow hoist.

==== Governmental flags ====
Flag	Use	Details
	State constitution flag	Differences with State Flag at "Tombak" and "Keris".
	State ceremonial flag	A yellow field and a blue bordure defaced with a red scroll bearing the words "Istiadat Kerajaan" on the bottom left and a blue state crest on the bottom right, with the Kelantanese flag in the canton.
	Flag of the Menteri Besar	A blue flag with a white hoist, with a white crescent and star and two white kris and spears charged on the fly.
	Flag of the Deputy Menteri Besar	A green flag with a blue hoist, with a white crescent and star and two white kris and spears charged on the fly.
	Flag of the Ministers with Portfolio	A red flag with a grey hoist, with a white crescent and star and two white kris and spears charged on the fly.
	Flag of the Ministers without Portfolio	A red flag with a grey hoist.
	Flag of the State Secretary	A red flag with a green hoist, with a white crescent and star and two white kris and spears charged on the fly.
	Flag of the Mufti	A green flag with a white crescent and star and two white kris and spears charged on the fly.
	Flag of the Members of the State Legislative Assembly	A blue flag with a white crescent and star and two white kris and spears charged on the fly.
	Flag of the Private Secretary to the Sultan	A blue-red per bend divided flag with a white crescent and star and two white kris and spears in the bottom right.
	Flag of the Head of Royal Ceremonies	A yellow-blue per bend divided flag with a white crescent and star and two white kris and spears in the bottom right.
	Flag of the Personal Assistant to the Sultan	A horizontally divided blue-over-red flag with a white crescent and star and two white kris and spears charged on the centre.
	State ensign	A blue field with a white crescent and star and two white kris and spears in a red canton.
	Civil ensign	A blue field with a red canton.

==== District flags ====
As with neighbouring Terengganu as well as Johor, each administrative district (jajahan) in Kelantan was assigned its own flag. The flags follow a standard pattern - the flag is divided into four quarters with the Kelantan flag occupying the canton, the bottom right quarter coloured red (as per the Kelantan flag) and the remaining quarters assigned the district's respective colour. The design somehow bears a semblance to the flag of Selangor.

District	Flag	Colour	Remarks
Kota Bharu		Black	State capital & royal seat
Tumpat		Navy	Second administration area & Terminus of the KTM East Coast Line.
Pasir Mas		Purple	State duty free trade zone & third administrative area
Bachok		Light blue	State tourism beach centre
Pasir Puteh		Grey	State fish port
Machang		Green	Hot water pool & cultivation of grapes
Tanah Merah		Yellow	The longest old railway track in the state (second in Malaysia)
Jeli		Orange	Natural area
Kuala Krai		Dark Green	Rural (Ulu) areas & Palm oil plantation area also the highest waterfall area in Southeast Asia
Gua Musang		Pink	The limestone cave and mangrove hiking area is also a logging area
Lojing		Apple green	Mountain areas & tall hills are also Orang Asli settlement & logging area

== Coat of arms ==
=== Design ===
Coat of arms of Kelantan
- Armiger: Kelantan
- Adopted: 1920 (latest version)
- Crest: The Royal Crown of Kelantan proper
- Shield: Two spears in pale point upwards, between two krises in chief point inwards and two cannons dismounted in base point outwards, all surmounted by a crescent and mullet.
- Supporters: Two muntjacs springing
- Motto: برسراه كڤد توهن كراجأن كلنتن (Berserah Kepada Tuhan Kerajaan Kelantan) 'The Kingdom of Kelantan Surrenders to God' in Jawi Script
- Other elements: Three Decorative Flora

The Kelantanese coat of arms, bearing elements of Western heraldry, consists of a crescent and a five-pointed star backed by three sets of weapons (compared to only two on the state's flag). The arms is further supported by a pair of springing muntjacs (kijangs), topped by a crown, and includes a motto as a scroll below. Also present are decorative flora. The arms may be depicted entirely in yellow-to-orange, but variants with more vibrant inclusions of red and blue are also in use.

The Kelantese arms was introduced in 1916 under the order of Sultan Muhammad IV. Originally consisting of only the crescent and star, the three pair of weapons and the motto, the kijangs and coronet were only added several years later by Sultan Ismail.(1880 - 1944), resulting in its present form. Until 1916, Kelantan had no coat of arms.

Details of the arms' elements are as follows:

Crown
The helm is depicted as a crown adorned with crescents and five-pointed stars, representing the sovereignty of the Kelantanese Sultan.

Crescent and five-pointed star
Together with the weapons, the crescent and five-pointed star form the principal element of the arms, with the crescent pointed upwards and its tips at the same height as the star. They symbolise the Islamic faith.

Dual spears and krises
The dual spears and unsheathed krises, traditional weapons of Kelantanese Malay culture, back the crescent, with the spears pointing upwards and the kris pointing at diagonal directions downwards and inwards. Both weapons signify the strength of Kelantanese Malays.

Dual cannons
Like the spears and krises, the dual cannons back the crescent, but point outwards and downwards diagonally. The cannons represent the Kelantan's constant readiness to defend itself.

Supporters
The supporters of the arms are two springing muntjacs (kijangs), which serves as a reminder of Kelantan's long history. The kijang's prominence may trace back to the rule of the legendary Queen of Kelantan, Che' Siti Wan Kembang who adored her beloved kijang to the point of adopting coin with their depictions.

Motto
The motto consists of a scroll with written Jawi that reads (Surrender to God Kingdom of Kelantan).
