= Allah Rahmatkan Raja Kami =

State anthem of Pahang, Malaysia

English: God Bless Our King
- State anthem of Pahang
- Also known as: Allah Selamatkan Sultan Kami
- Music: Dorothy Lilian Sworder, 1924
- Adopted: 1925

Audio sample
- Allah Rahmatkan Raja Kami (chorus): file; help

Allah Rahmatkan Raja Kami (pronounced [allah rahmatkan raja kami]; God, Bless Our King) is the state anthem of Pahang officially adopted in 1925. The anthem was based on the song Perang Pahang ('Pahang War'), re-arranged by Miss Dorothy Lilian Sworder in December 1924.

The anthem was also known as Allah Selamatkan Sultan Kami (God, Save Our Sultan).

== History ==
"Allah Selamatkan Sultan Kami" (chorus)
State anthem of Pahang until 2025 (vocal)

In 1924, during the reign of Sultan Abdullah al-Mu'tassim Billah, a competition was arranged in Pahang to select a tune for the state anthem. One of the entries was submitted by Miss Dorothy Lilian Sworder (1892–1982), daughter of the Agricultural Officer at Pekan, who was paying he father a visit. Miss Sworder was a talented musician and an LRAM. Her composition, which was the re-arranged version of the song Perang Pahang, was selected and presented by the British Resident of Pahang, H.W Thompson to the Sultan on 1 May 1925. The music score of the anthem was sent to Kuala Lumpur and performed for the first time by the State Band during the meeting of the Federal council during the same year.

== Lyrics ==
The current official anthem is a modified version of the original lyrics.

Pre-2025 lines saw the third line, the original term Kebawah Duli Yang Maha Mulia was revised to Duli Yang Maha Mulia. Similarly, at the seventh line, the Ke Bawah Duli Raja Kami was also revised to Duli Tuanku Raja Kami.

In 2025, to reflect the current title of Al-Sultan Abdullah, the same lines once again revised to Duli Paduka Baginda and Duli Baginda Raja Kami. The sixth line was also changed from Ya Allah, selamatkanlah to Ya Allah, rahmatkanlah.

Malay in Rumi
Malay in Jawi
IPA transcription (Note: See Help:IPA/Malay.)
Translation
Allah Rahmatkan Sultan Kami

Ya Allah yang maha kuasa
Lanjutkan usia
Duli paduka baginda
Dirgahayu, darul makmur
Aman dan bahagia sentiasa
Ya Allah rahmatkanlah
Duli baginda raja kami.

يا الله يڠ مها كواس
لنجوتكن أوسيا
دولي ڤدوك بڬيندا
ديرݢاهايو دار المعمور
أمان دان بهاݢيا سنتياس
يا ألله رحمةکنله
دولي بڬيندا راج كامي

[ja ɑllɑh jaŋ maha kuasa]
[landʒutkan us‿ia]
[duli paduka baginda]
[dirgahaju darul maʔmur]
[aman dan bahagia sənti‿asa]
[ja ɑllɑh rahmatkanlah]
[duli baginda radʒa kami]

O God the Almighty
Grant a long life
To His Royal Highness
Long live to you, our Land of Tranquility
Grant us peace and happiness
O Almighty Lord, bless
His Royal Highness, our King.
