= Sudirman (singer) =

Malaysian singer and songwriter (1954–1992)

Allahyarham Penghibur Lagenda Dato' Sudirman Arshad DSAP JMN
- Sudirman in 1976
- Born: Sudirman bin Arshad; 25 May 1954; Temerloh, Pahang, Federation of Malaya (now Malaysia)
- Died: 22 February 1992 (aged 37); Lucky Garden, Bangsar, Kuala Lumpur, Malaysia
- Resting place: Chengal Muslim Cemetery, Temerloh, Pahang
- Other name: Sudir
- Education: University of Malaya (LLB)
- Occupations: Singer, lawyer, actor, writer, businessman, cartoonist, journalist
- Years active: 1976–1992
- Spouse: Datin Kamariah "Kay" Jamaluddin (m. 1982; div. 1984)
- Parents: Haji Arshad bin Haji Hassan (father); Hajah Romlah binti Dahalan (mother); Hajah Mariam binti Mohamad (stepmother)
- Relatives: Datin Rodziah Arshad (sister); Dr Razman Azrai Zainudin (Atai; nephew)
- Musical career
- Genre: Malaysian Pop
- Instrument: Vocals
- Labels: Warnada Record; EMI Music Publishing Malaysia Sdn. Bhd.

Dato' Sudirman bin Haji Arshad (25 May 1954 – 22 February 1992), known mononymously as Sudirman, was a Malaysian singer, songwriter and actor. His singing career kicked off after winning the Bintang RTM singing competition on 11 August 1976. His career defining moment came after he was awarded winner of the "1989 Asia's No. 1 Performer" title during the ‘'Asian Popular Music Awards'’ competition held at the Royal Albert Hall in London on 19 March 1989. Throughout his career, he was known as the "Singing Lawyer", the "People's Singer", the "Patriotic Singer" and the "Elvis Presley and Claude François of Malaysia". Apart from being a singer and actor, he was also a lawyer, a composer, writer (specifically focused in producing memoirs and children books), cartoonist, and entrepreneur.

He represented Malaysia at the 1985 ABU Popular Song Contest.

== Early life ==
Sudirman was born on 25 May 1954 in Temerloh, Pahang, the youngest of seven siblings. His father, Arshad Hassan, was a manager of a local bus company in Sudirman's family hometown, whereas his mother, Romlah Dahalan, used to work as a seamstress and was also the first woman to become a Malaysian state assemblywoman in Pahang during the 1950s. Romlah was often away from home due to being active in politics, causing Sudirman to miss her badly. Both of his parents had also been involved in the business of fabrics and clothing. Sources indicate that he was named after Indonesian army general Sudirman by his father, who had hoped that he would grow up to become a brave warrior.

Sudirman's mother Romlah battled with cervical cancer and died at the age of 33, when he was just five. His father then remarried a woman named Mariam Mohamad. According to Sudirman, his stepmother did not adapt easily with her new family. His passion for singing and entertainment started at a very young age, as during his childhood he would entertain his family and neighbours and they in turn would happily let him do so and encourage him.

He completed his secondary education in Sultan Abu Bakar School (SABS), Temerloh. After turning down a scholarship to further his studies in medicine, he studied law instead at the University of Malaya in 1976. He then received his degree with third class honours four years later together with Malaysia's current and former Attorney General Idrus Harun and Abdul Gani Patail. He commenced his pupillage in 1982 under Mr Ong Joo Theam of Messrs Abdul Aziz, Ong & Co. He was called to the bar in 1984 in and commenced practice thereafter, though he left due to lack of interest.

It was during his period of studying law that he managed to juggle time between singing and tutorial classes. His big break came when he entered Johan Bintang RTM, a singing competition organised by public broadcaster Radio Televisyen Malaysia held in Malacca in August 1976, where he swooned the audience with his spontaneous sense of humour and melodious singing.

== Career ==
=== Music ===
Possessing of a clear piercing tenor with a breadth of range and dynamic control especially at the extreme high end, Sudirman's voice was instantly recognisable. His ability to act through his voice is evident from songs such as "Bercanda di Pasiran Pantai", a Latin-flavoured duet with Anita Sarawak. His unique talents had helped him to win many local competitions from Bintang RTM's Best Singer (1976) to Muzik-Muzik TV3's Best Performer and Berita Harian's Most Popular Artist, which was voted by fans. He topped Malaysian, Brunei and Indonesia charts with songs such as "Merisik Khabar" (Seeking News), "Milik Siapakah Gadis Ini" (Who Does This Girl Belong To) and "Salam Terakhir" (Final Greetings). Songwriters who have supported him in the past include S. Atan, Manan Ngah, Michael Veerapan and Syed Harun.

Sudirman was also the first Malaysian singer to perform at The Paddock at the Hilton of Kuala Lumpur in 1983 and was the singing ambassador for companies such as Proton, Malaysia Airlines, Honda and honoured pioneer card member with Hong Leong Bank. He was known for his versatility, singing Malay, Indian, Chinese and English songs with prominent choreography, and even sketched portraits of his fans while singing.

Several musicians have played for him, including Alex Boon, Jay Jay, Hillary Ang, Ricky Omar, Fauzi Marzuki, Michael Veerapan, Mac Chiew and Jenny Chin. There were also women, whom he refers to as "The Girls", who have performed with him as his dancers, including supermodel Samantha Schubert and Linda Jasmine Hashim, who is now one of the leading dancing choreographer-cum-teachers in Malaysia's reality TV program show Akademi Fantasia. Backup singers who have worked with him include Liza Aziz, who is the daughter of actress Normahdiah and actor Aziz Jaafar, and Sheena, Orkid Abdullah's daughter.

Some Muslim fundamentalists and leftists, however, were not in favour of his concert performances. Some even distributed warning pamphlets that "something would happen" during his Universiti Kebangsaan Malaysia (UKM) Bangi concert to deter people from attending, possibly about concerns that his songs were claimed to be mixed with Western influences, which would derail their Muslim faiths. The concert was postponed following protests from the UKM students union body, its academic staff association, and the dean of the Islamic Studies faculty, as well as six other student bodies, who were concerned about Sudirman's "attempt to destroy the Eastern culture and Islamic holiness by performing the derailed Western style". This incident was captured by Zainuddin Maidin, who was then a journalist, now former Minister of Information, in his book "The Other Side of Mahathir". He narrated that the then-Prime Minister Mahathir Mohamad had called a few ministers to his residence to review the situation as the issue reflected Malaysia's position in terms of modernisation. The meeting led to the conclusion that the show had to be allowed to continue. Sudirman's fans turned up in force. He went about pleasing the crowd, crooning his hits. One campus resident said, "At last something alive has come here." The negativity surrounding the UKM incident did not last long, as a couple of years after his death in 1992, UKM held a Sudirman karaoke competition.

Sudirman produced an album for his favourite nephew, Razman Azrai, under Sudirman Productions. Also known as Atai, his nephew had a couple of hit songs that topped the charts in 1985. Atai also performed for Malaysia Day in 2014, as well as the Chow Kit Road concert 2.0 in 2016 and in SEA Games in 2017.

In 1983, Sudirman sang a song titled "Mama", dedicated to the actress and singer Saloma. When he approached her shortly before her death, she expressed her disbelief with tears, that someone would still remember and make a song solely for her.

On 14 April 1986, Sudirman held an open-air concert on Chow Kit Road, which was the first time ever that a street concert drew a 100,000-strong crowd on a Monday night. It jammed the stretch of Jalan Tuanku Abdul Rahman, Jalan Raja Muda to Jalan Raja Alang. Tan Sri Zaman Khan, the Head of KL police, then mentioned 'the crowd was so huge that we were praying at the office that it would be controlled' . Several fans fainted in the crowd, a few suffocated and were rushed to the hospital. Fans were seen not only on the streets but on top of roofs and trees. The Star, wrote that "Kuala Lumpur came to a standstill and it had nothing to do with the recession, but with one man, Malaysia's top entertainer, an electrifying performance and most memorable night".

Sudirman's songs topped the charts with every new album that he released. His song "Merisik Khabar" climbed up to the No. 1 position for two months while his second song "Milik Siapakah Gadis Ini" from the same album came in second and stayed at the top for a few weeks after "Merisik Khabar".

On 19 March 1989, Sudirman won "1989 Asia's No. 1 Performer" at the "Asian Popular Music Awards" contest at the Royal Albert Hall in London with his "One Thousand Million Smiles", defeating contenders including Hong Kong singer Leslie Cheung, Singaporean singer Anita Sarawak, Japanese singer-songwriter Epo, Thai singer Anchalee, Taiwanese singer Chyi Chin, Chinese singer-songwriter Cui Jian, South Korean singer Koo Chang-Mo, and Filipino singer Kuh Ledesma . Judges in the contest include Sinitta Renau Malone, a mentor in Britain's famous TV program, UK X factor and was dating Simon Cowell of American Idol. Other prominent judges include Chairman of BPI British Phonographic Industry Peter Jamieson, and Dutch singer C.C. Catch, while James Fisher Director of European Collection Body ASCAP. Boney M was the performing guest of the contest. As Malaysians united in celebration of his historic success, Sudirman dedicated the win to his country and then Prime Minister Mahathir Mohamad.

He was chosen to solely perform for the closing ceremony of the Southeast Asian Games on the same year and many others events, such as the opening ceremony of Sepak Takraw competition, Merdeka, New Year, and other national functions. In most cases, he would use his own money to ensure a successful concert.

Sudirman also had a strong fanbase in Singapore. His concert there resulted in a large turnout at the Kallang National Stadium in August 1987. Kelvin Tan Look Siew, Director of Singapore Armed Forces Music & Drama company, said, "We wanted to bring down a prominent artist from the region and Sudirman's name automatically cropped up."

EMI London took him on to work together with the British production trio Stock Aitken Waterman with a song titled "Love Will Find a Way", released with the album Rising by Donovan. Vic Lanza, manager of Wham!, declared Sudirman as the "institution of Malaysian Music industry". He was brought to Abbey Road Studios to record the album, but died soon afterwards.

=== Literatures ===
Sudirman Arshad wrote his autobiography Dari Dalam Sudir (From Inside Sudir), comic book Sejarah Awal Sudirman (Sudirman's Early History) in addition to some cartoons and weekly columns for magazines and some local newspapers such as Karangkraf.

One of his books for children titled "Taming Si Budak Pintar" (Taming The Genius Kid) was recognised the best by Mobil-Mabopa, a Mobil Oil book writing competition.

Moreover, he was also a journalist and columnist, who wrote on various serious issues. One journalist puts it, "It was quite difficult for us to concentrate on our job. The person sitting across the table during the meeting is a celebrity!" Those he interviewed include Tun Ghafar Baba.

=== Acting ===
Besides singing and writing, Sudirman also acted in a film called Kami (We), which was released in 1982. It was about two destitute orphans who find each other amidst the Kuala Lumpur street life. One of the film's tracks, "Pelangi Petang", or Evening Rainbow, has since been heralded as one of his iconic works.

=== Television ===
Aside from hosting various main prime time TV singing programs like Mekar Sejambak, Sudirman also successfully hosted Malaysia's TV prime time gameshow "Keluarga Bahagia Singer". This program was sponsored by Singer Malaysia, a subsidiary of Singer Corporation (before it was taken over by Berjaya Group in 1989).

=== Charity work ===
Sudirman was also well known for his charity work in which he helped invite veteran artists in the slots of his singing shows aside from giving them generous donations. Money charity for mosques and people in need such as Yayasan Ozanam was something he would do willingly. During his life, he had also adopted and brought up an Indian boy from a poor family and he would actively seek charity work through the Singers, Musicians and Composers Association of Malaysia (PAPITA).

=== Business ===
Sudirman also became Malaysia's first successful singer-entrepreneur by promoting his carbonated drink Sudi with business magazines and TV programs from Australia to Hong Kong featuring the drinks. Within six months, Sudi broke five per cent of the carbonated drink market in Malaysia.

Later, after his conglomerate, SUDI Sdn. Bhd., was established, Sudirman opened a franchise of Sudi Shoppe clothing apparel famous for his unique sunglass signature, and his restaurant, Restoran Selera Sudi located at the side of his record studio, Sudirman Productions. The company initially planned to launch "Sudi Rasa", with canned meals such as sardines, coconut powders, fruits, cocktails and instant noodles. It also purposed to release special cooking oils, tomato and chilli sauces, under the same product name.

He was Malaysia's first singer to be on the cover of Malaysian Business and Asian Business magazine. He had a business office atop the UBN Shangrila Tower and Sri Hartamas. He also served as vice-president of PAPITA.

Aside from food company, Sudirman also owns a recording studio, Sudirman Productions, located at what is now Taman Sri Hartamas. During its active years, it had recorded several albums involving various singers, including Sahabat, Sudirman's album dedicated to his nephew, Razman Azrai Zainudin, or Atai. He had also hired Michael Bernie Chin and Dharanee Dharan Kannan in 1987 before their resignations, which then forced him to run the studio by himself. In that period, he chose singer Uji Rashid, known for her beautiful voices, to partner with him. She also had a commitment with a private drama studio, which she was running at the time, causing her to be outside Kuala Lumpur for a long time. These revelations forced Sudirman to shut down his recording studio in 1991.

Sudirman's companies ceased to exist in September 1991, shortly before his death, due to financial and management problems as well as his worsening illness.

== Illness and death ==
On 17 July 1991, Sudirman was admitted to Pusat Perubatan Tawakkal Kuala Lumpur (ICU) for 4 days. It was reported that he collapsed while singing at Butterworth, Penang. He died at 4 a.m. on 22 February 1992 at his sister Datin Rudiah's house in Bangsar, Kuala Lumpur, after suffering from pneumonia for 7 months. He was 37 years old.

Thousands in Malaysia took part in his funeral procession. His remains were brought to his hometown in Temerloh, Pahang, where he was laid to rest at Chengal Muslim Cemetery near the graves of his parents, which was what he had wished.

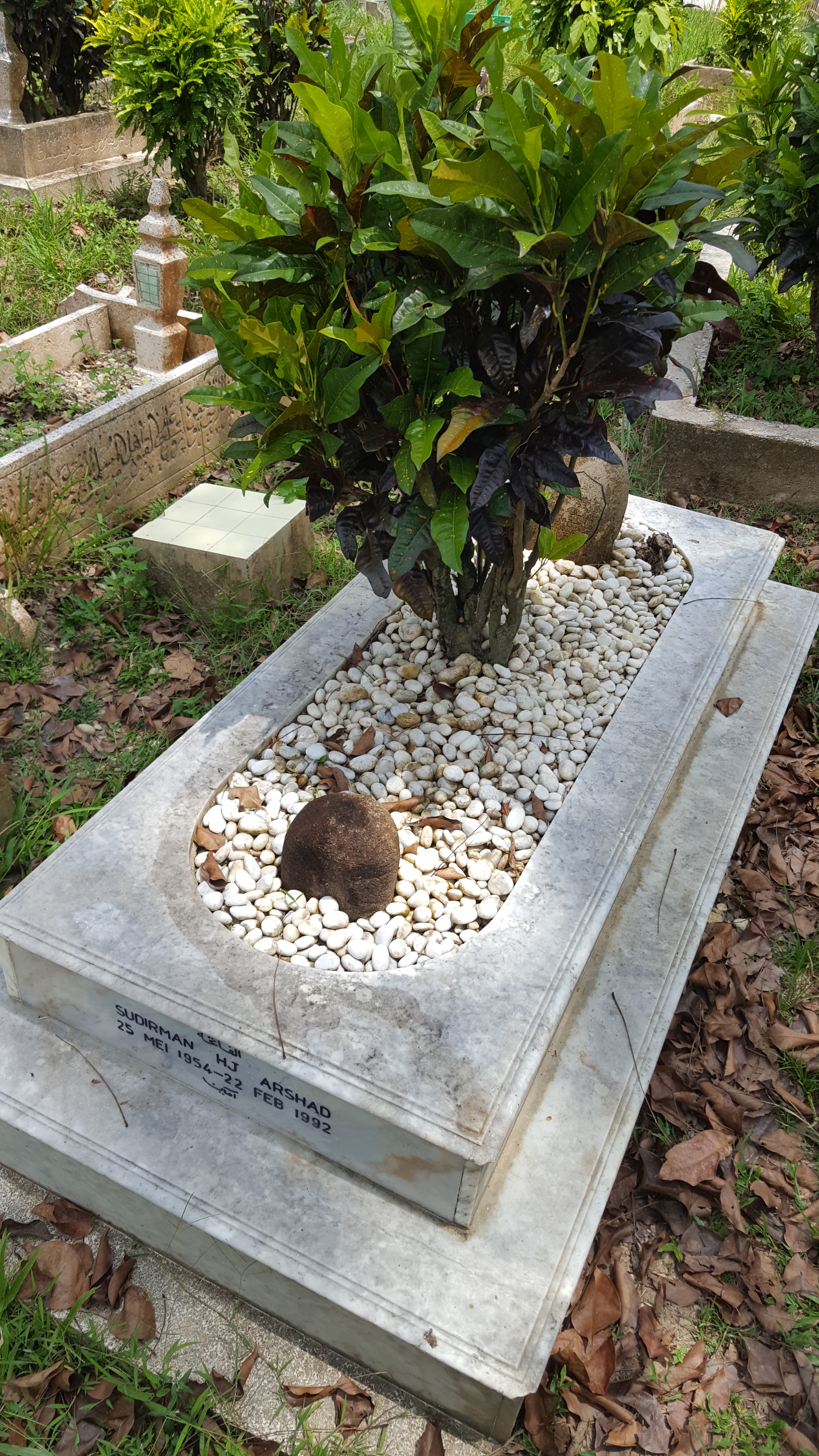
Sudirman's gravesite at Chengal Muslim Cemetery, Temerloh, Pahang.

== Legacy ==
Sudirman was named 'Malaysia's Singing Ambassador' by the Malaysia Tourism Development Board (MTDC). He was the voice behind the MTDC (Malaysian Tourism Development Corp) tune, To know Malaysia is to love Malaysia which was composed by American Emmy, Grammy and Oscar nominated singer and songwriter Carol Connors. He was referred to as the 'Singing Dynamite' by Singaporean journalists. His singing brought him standing ovations in Australia (in Sydney and Melbourne), Japan, Kuwait and the United States (Hawaii). Simon Napier-Bell, the manager for George Michael's band Wham!, referred to Sudirman Arshad as the 'institution of Malaysian music industry'.

He was posthumously awarded an Anugerah Industri Muzik award and a street (Jalan Sudirman) was named after him in his hometown of Temerloh. PAPITA created an award especially categorised under his name, which to this date has yet to be won by anyone.

In the Malaysia Book of Records, he was given a posthumous award together with P. Ramlee, Mokhtar Dahari, Tun Ghafar Baba and Ramasamy Letchemanah (Mighty Man).

On 26 July 2010, The National Choir paid a tribute to Sudirman by organising a concert in conjunction with the KL Music Festival 2010, with an audience of about 1,000 present.

In 2011, his life journey documentary, Sudirman Arshad aired on The History Channel (Astro Channel 555) on 20 February 2011, produced by FINAS and AETN All-Asia Networks. It also reaired on RTM on 22 February 2015.

On 2014, Malaysia's 57th independence day's theme is "Disini Lahirnya Sebuah Cinta" (Here Is The Birth Of Love) which is the starting line for Sudirman's "Warisan" (Legacy).

From 3 to 5 November 2016, Kuala Lumpur Performing Arts Centre created a musical tribute for Sudirman, having sponsors from JTI Malaysia, UEM Group, My Kasih Foundation, Yakult, Ambank and Nationwide Express. Yayasan Sime Darby gave out its first ever fund to create the Sudirman Scholarship Fund for young people.

On 25 May 2019, on Sudirman's 65th birthday, he was honored with a Google Doodle.

On 18 Aug, 2022, the National Archive organized a Sudirman Gallery, in the heart of Kuala Lumpur at Fahrenheit 88 mall. It was launched by Tengku Hassanal Ibrahim Alam Shah, the son of then Yang di-Pertuan Agong Abdullah of Pahang.

On 31 Aug, 2022, as part of Malaysia's Independence Day celebration, a metaverse was created called the Merdekaverse. One of the portals is where Sudirman's performance of "Tanggal 31" can be found.

On 16 September 2023, the Malaysian Philharmonic Orchestra launched a concert tribute to Sudirman, which featured a hologram of him. The concert was attended by former Prime Minister Mahathir Mohamad and his wife Siti Hasmah.

== Awards and recognitions ==
- Penghibur TV Terbaik, Anugerah Seri Angkasa, RTM 1978
- "Malaysia's Singing Ambassador" MTDC 1985 ("To know Malaysia is to love Malaysia")
- Persembahan Terbaik Anugerah Juara Lagu TV3, 1987
- Malaysia's Indian Music Award, 1987
- Penyanyi Lelaki Popular, Anugerah Bintang Popular Berita Harian 1989
- Asia's Number One Performer at the Salem Music Award London, 1989
- Malaysia Guinness Awards
- Ahli Mahkota Pahang by Sultan of Pahang, 1990
- Ahli Mangku Negara by Yang di-Pertuan Agong, 1990
- Johan Mangku Negara by Yang di-Pertuan Agong, 1992
- No. 1 Malaysian singer (from New Straits Times)
- Darjah Sultan Ahmad Shah Pahang (DSAP), carrying the posthumous title of Dato' by Sultan of Pahang, 2009
- Balik Kampung voted as Malaysia's best song ever by readers of the Star Online, 2013
- song "Disini Lahirnya Sebuah Cinta" chosen for National Independence Day theme (Tema Merdeka Malaysia Ke-57), 2014
- Sudirman Scholarship Fund created by Yayasan Sime Darby launched in Kuala Lumpur Performing Arts Centre on 5 November 2016 with a musical tribute
- In South East Asia Games 2017, Sudirman's song balik kampung was performed by his nephew 'Atai' and ' Datuk Aznil Hj Nawawi'
- University Malaya launched Sudirman exhibition centre in its library in 2018
- Sudirman Cafe at EDC Hotel KL launched in 2018
- Tun Dr. Mahathir on 14 June 2018 eve of eid mentioned Selamat Hari Raya song sang and written by Sudirman as his favourite eid song
- 25 May 2019, Google doodles Sudirman on his birth date
- 18 Aug 2022, Archive Department, Kamura and Sudirman Asset Management launched "Sudirman Gallery" officiated by the Regent of Pahang, Kebawah Duli Yang Maha Mulia Tengku Hassanal Ibrahim Alam Shah ibni Al-Sultan Abdullah Ri’ayatuddin Al-Mustafa Billah Shah
- 31 Aug 2022, Launching of a Malaysian artist first metaverse by Ministry Mxr
- 29 Aug 2023, Malaysian Philharmonic Orchestra made a concert on the late Sudirman with VIP attended by Tun Dr Mahathir and Dato Seri Shafie Apdhal
- 5 Dec 2024, cinema Film "Babah" has a scene deliberating facts on Sudirman
- 11 May 2025, one of Malaysia's famous rap and r&b group KRU had a momentous concert GenKRU at Axiata Arena, paid a tribute to Sudirman by singing the song Terasing and acknowledged the presence of his nephew atai. The concert is mainly sponsored by Maybank.
- 5 Feb 2026, Kita Kita Aje podcast hosted by Datuk Aznil Hj Nawawi interviewed Atai and his experience with Sudirman Hj Arshad

== Discography ==
- Teriring Doa 1976 (EP)
- Aku Penghiburmu (1978)
- Perasaan (1979)
- Anak Muda (1980)
- Lagu Anak Desa (1981)
- Lagu Dari Kota (1981)
- Twinkle Twinkle Little Star (1981)
- Abadi (1982)
- Lagu Cinta (1982)
- Images (1983)
- Orang Baru (1984)
- Lagu Dari Sebuah Bilik (1984)
- Orang Kampung (1986)
- Kul it! (1986)
- Asia’s No. 1 Performer (1989)

Among his other songs are Tanggal 31 Ogos and Tegakkan Bendera Kita.

== Filmography ==
=== Film ===
Year	Title	Role
1982	Kami	Tookoo

=== Television ===
Year	Title	Role	TV channel
1987	Keluarga Bahagia Singer	Host with Atai	TV1
1987–1988	Istimewa Bersama Sudirman	Himself	TV1
1988	Mekar Sejambak	Guest with Atai	TV1
