= Selamat Sultan =

State anthem of Kelantan, Malaysia

English: (God) Save The Sultan
- Coat of arms of Kelantan
- State anthem of Kelantan
- Lyrics: Tengku Mahmood Mahyideen, 5 July 1927-1935
- Music: Mohamed Bin Hamzah Saaid, 5 July 1927
- Adopted: 1927

Audio sample
- Vocal: file; help

Instrumental

Selamat Sultan (pronounced [sə.la.mat sul.tan]) is the state anthem of Kelantan, Malaysia. Its melody was composed in 1927 by Allahyarham Mohamed bin Hamzah Saaid (1895–1971), the Goa-born Bandmaster of the Kelantan Police Band who was ordered to have an instrumental song played for the then-Sultan of Kelantan, Sultan Ismail ibni Sultan Muhammad IV. Subsequently, the words were composed by Tengku Mahmood Mahyideen (1908-1954), who was the State Superintendent of Education at that time.

== Lyrics ==
Rumi script

Lanjutkan usia Al-Sultan kami,
Sultan Kelantan raja ikrami,
Aman sentosa Tuhan sirami,
Kekal memerintah kami.

Kasih dan taat setia disembahkan,
Keriangan diucapkan,
Segala kebesaran Allah cucurkan,
Bertambah kemuliaan.

Jawi script

لنجوتکن اوسيا السلطان کامي⹁
سلطان کلنتن راج اکرامي⹁
امان سنتوسا توهن سيرمي⹁
ککل ممرينته کامي.

کاسيه دان طاعة ستيا دسمبهکن⹁
کرياڠن دأوچاڤکن⹁
سݢالا کبسرن الله چوچورکن⹁
برتامبه کمولياءن.

IPA transcription (Note: See Help:IPA/Malay.)

[lan.d͡ʒut.kan u.si.a al.sul.tan ka.mi]
[sul.tan kə‿lan.tan ra.d͡ʒa iʔ.ra.mi]
[a.man sən.to.sa tu.han si.ra.mi]
[kə.kal mə.mə.rin.tah ka.mi]

[ka.sih dan ta.ʔat sə.ti.a di.səm.bah.kan]
[kə.ri.a.ŋan di.u.t͡ʃap.kan]
[sə.ga.la kə.bə.sa.ran ɑɫ'ɫɑːh t͡ʃu.t͡ʃur.kan]
[bər.tam.bah kə.mu.li.a.ʔan]

English translation

Prolonged be the life of our Sultan,
The divine Sultan of Kelantan,
In peace with God's blessing,
Forever rule over us.

Love and loyalty we offer,
A wish of happiness we utter,
May God bless him with greatness,
And his glory increase.
