= Maju dan Sejahtera =

Anthem of Kuala Lumpur, Malaysia

Maju dan Sejahtera (Progress and Prosper) is the official anthem of the Federal Territories of Malaysia. The anthem was adopted on 12 August 2006. On 28 January 2011, the new anthem and lyrics for the Federal Territories were launched.

== Old anthem (2006 - 2011) ==
Maju dan Sejahtera
English: Progress and Prosper
- State anthem of the Federal Territories of Malaysia
- Lyrics: Datuk Wah Idris, 2006
- Music: Datuk Wah Idris, 2006
- Adopted: 12 August 2006
- Relinquished: 28 January 2011

The old canticle of the Federal Territories was entirely written and composed by Datuk Wah Idris, both in 2006.

=== Lyrics ===
Malay (Rumi) lyrics	Malay (Jawi) lyrics	English translation
Harmoni Wilayah Pertiwi; Semoga Sentiasa Diberkati; Wawasan Hala Pembangunan; Sebagai Semangat Perpaduan; Wilayah Persekutuan; Maju dan Sejahtera	هرموني ولايه ڤرتيوي سموݢ سنتياس دبرکتي واوسن هالا ڤمباڠونن سباݢاي سماڠت ڤرڤادوان ولايه ڤرسکوتوان ماجو دان سجهترا	Harmonious are this country's territories May it always be blessed Our vision directs our development as the spirit of unity Federal Territories; Progress and Prosper

== New anthem (2011 - present) ==
Wilayah Persekutuan Maju dan Sejahtera
English: The Progressive and Prosperous Federal Territory
- State anthem of the Federal Territories of Malaysia
- Lyrics: Syed Indera Syed Omar, 2011
- Music: Suhaimi Mohd Zain, 2011
- Adopted: 28 January 2011

Audio sample
- "Maju dan Sejahtera" (chorus): file; help

"Maju dan Sejahtera" (instrumental)
New arrangement of Maju dan Sejahtera

The lyrics for the new anthem were written by Syed Indera Syed Omar and its musical composed by Suhaimi Mohd Zain, both in 2011.

=== Lyrics ===
Malay (Rumi) lyrics	Malay (Jawi) lyrics	English translation
Inilah Wilayah Bumi Yang Bertuah; Maju Membangun Dijulang Megah; Aman Sentosa Di Sepanjang Masa; Teguh Disemai Sentiasa Membara Semangat Setiap Warganya; Cergas Mindanya Semangat Waja; Pada Wilayah Ditumpah Setia; Hormat Hormati Penuh Mesra Bersatulah, Berbaktilah; Semua Warga Wilayah; Sayangilah, Lindungilah; Sepenuh Jiwa Raga Kita Jaga Keharmonian Semua; Maju Sejahtera; Wilayah Persekutuan	اينله ولايه بومي يڠ برتواه ماجو ممباڠون دجولڠ مݢه امان سنتوسا د سڤنجڠ ماس تݢوه دسماي سنتياس ممبارا سماڠت ستياڤ ورݢڽ چرݢس مينداڽ سماڠت واج ڤد ولايه دتومڤه ستيا حرمت حرمتي ڤنوه مسرا برساتوله، بربقتيله سموا ورݢ ولايه سايڠيله، ليندوڠيله سڤنوه جيوا راݢ کيت جاݢ کهرمونين سموا ماجو سجهترا ولايه ڤرسکوتوان	This is the Territory, the fortunate land Develop onwards, raised gloriously Being peace at all time The firmness always manured The peoples' spirit is burning Their spirit is active, and in resilience To the Territory giving loyalty Cordially be respective Let's unite, let's serve Oh all the Territory peoples Let's love, let's protect Wholeheartedly Let's keep the harmony together Be progressive and prosperous, the Federal Territory
