= Saiful Bahri =

Indonesian musician

- Born: 19 September 1924; Payakumbuh, West Sumatra, Dutch East Indies
- Died: 26 December 1976 (aged 52); Tokyo, Japan
- Resting place: TPU Tanah Kusir
- Other names: Surya Buana, Sjaiful Bachri, Allahyarham Saiful Bahri Ilyas
- Education: INS (Indonesisch Nederlansche School) Kayutanam
- Occupations: Musician; composer; songwriter
- Known for: "Melaka Maju Jaya", "Duli Yang Maha Mulia", Tiga Dara
- Awards: Citra Award

Saiful Bahri (19 September 1924 – 26 December 1976) was an Indonesian saxophonist, violinist, bandleader, composer, and songwriter, active in Indonesia and Malaysia during the 1950s and 1960s. He was also famous for conducting a number of orchestras during the period. Bahri composed and wrote Melaka Maju Jaya, the Malaccan state anthem, and wrote the lyrics to Duli Yang Maha Mulia, the Selangor state anthem.

== Life and career ==
Bahri was born in Payakumbuh, West Sumatra, in the then-Dutch East Indies.

He was educated at INS Kayutanam, a colonial-era school for the Bumiputera, where he sharpened his musical skills. In 1941, Bahri moved to Jakarta, and became a saxophonist and violinist for the Jakarta Studio Orchestra (OSD). From 1950 to 1960, he served as conductor for the Orchestra.

In 1956, he composed the soundtrack to Tiga Dara. For this, he won the Citra Award at the 1960 Indonesian Film Festival for Best Soundtrack.

In 1963, during the Indonesia–Malaysia confrontation, he emigrated to Malaysia, quickly becoming a pillar for the nascent nation's cultural and arts scene. He was involved with Malayan Radio Orchestra and the Filem Negara Malaysia. During this period in his life, he used the alias Surya Buana. He also composed music scores for about hundreds of films from 1950s until his death. Bahri was known for his raspy, growling tenor saxophone sound.

== Death ==
Bahri died in Tokyo on 26 December 1976 while in service of the Filem Negara Malaysia. His remains were brought back to Jakarta, and interred at Tanah Kusir Public Cemetery.
