= Melaka Maju Jaya =

State anthem of Melaka, Malaysia

English: Malacca, Onwards Come!
- Coat of arms of Malacca
- State anthem of Malacca
- Lyrics: Collectively
- Music: Saiful Bahri and Alias Arshad
- Adopted: 1974

Audio sample
- Melaka Maju Jaya: file; help

"Melaka Maju Jaya" (chorus)
Official anthem of Malacca (vocal)

Melaka Maju Jaya (pronounced [məlaka madʒu dʒaja]); "Malacca, Onwards Come!") is the official anthem of the Malaysia state of Malacca. It was introduced and played for the first time on 31 August 1974 in conjunction with the state level independence day at that time.

The music was composed by Saiful Bahri, who also wrote the lyrics to the Selangor state anthem, Duli Yang Maha Mulia and Alias Arshad of the Royal Malaysian Police, while the lyrics were composed by a committee led by state secretary Datuk Haji Abu Mansor bin Haji Hassan. On 16 August 1994, the Malacca state government approved the modifications of the lyrics and tempo of the state anthem at its Executive council meeting to be played on 31 August that year.

== Lyrics ==
=== Current version since 1994 ===
Rumi script

Melaka, negeri bersejarah,
Tempat tumpah darah kita,
Dijunjung dengan sepenuh jiwa,
Untuk maju dan jaya!
Rakyat Melaka sudah bersatu padu,
Berikrar taat setia,
Jujur berkhidmat setiap masa,
Melaka, maju jaya!

Jawi script
ملاک⹁ نݢري برسجاره⹁
تمڤت تومڤه داره کيت⹁
دجونجوڠ دڠن سڤنوه جيوا⹁
اونتوق ماجو دان جاي!
رعيت ملاک سوده برساتو ڤادو⹁
براقرار طاعة ستيا⹁
جوجور برخدمت ستياڤ ماس⹁
ملاک⹁ ماجو جاي!
IPA transcription (Note: See Help:IPA/Malay.)

[mə.la.ka nə.gə.ri bər.sə.d͡ʒa.rah]
[təm.pat tum.pah da.rah ki.ta]
[di.d͡ʒun.d͡ʒuŋ də.ŋan sə.pə.nuh d͡ʒi.wa]
[un.tuʔ ma.d͡ʒu dan d͡ʒa.ja]
[raʔ.jat mə.la.ka su.dah bər.sa.tu pa.du]
[bər.iʔ.rar ta.ʔat sə.ti‿a]
[d͡ʒu.d͡ʒur bər.xid.mat sə.ti.ap ma.sa]
[mə.la.ka ma.d͡ʒu d͡ʒa.ja]

English translation

Malacca, o historic land,
The place where our blood has been shed,
We'll uphold with heart and hand,
Your glory by our toil!
We the people come as one,
Sworn solemn to be true,
To serve you the ages through,
Malacca, onwards come!

=== Original version (1974–1994) ===
Rumi script

Melaka, negeri Melaka,
Tempat tumpah darah kita,
Dijunjung dengan sepenuh jiwa,
Untuk maju dan jaya!
Rakyat Melaka sudah bersatu padu,
Berikrar taat setia,
Jujur berkhidmat setiap masa,
Melaka, maju jaya!

Jawi script
ملاک⹁ نݢري ملاک⹁
تمڤت تومڤه داره کيت⹁
دجونجوڠ دڠن سڤنوه جيوا⹁
اونتوق ماجو دان جاي!
رعيت ملاک سوده برساتو ڤادو⹁
براقرار طاعة ستيا⹁
جوجور برخدمت ستياڤ ماس⹁
ملاک⹁ ماجو جاي!
IPA transcription

[mə.la.ka nə.gə.ri mə.la.ka]
[təm.pat tum.pah da.rah ki.ta]
[di.d͡ʒun.d͡ʒuŋ də.ŋan sə.pə.nuh d͡ʒi.wa]
[un.tuʔ ma.d͡ʒu dan d͡ʒa.ja]
[raʔ.jat mə.la.ka su.dah bər.sa.tu pa.du]
[bər.iʔ.rar ta.ʔat sə.ti‿a]
[d͡ʒu.d͡ʒur bər.xid.mat sə.ti.ap ma.sa]
[mə.la.ka ma.d͡ʒu d͡ʒa.ja]

English translation

Malacca, o State of Malacca,
The place where our blood has been shed,
We'll uphold with heart and hand,
Your glory by our toil!
We the people come as one,
Sworn solemn to be true,
To serve you the ages through,
Malacca, onwards come!
