= Untuk Negeri Kita =

State anthem of Penang, Malaysia

English: For Our State
- Coat of arms of Penang
- State anthem of Penang
- Lyrics: Awaluddin Zainal Alam
- Music: Awaluddin Zainal Alam
- Adopted: 1972

Audio sample
- file; help

"Untuk Negeri Kita" (chorus)
Official anthem of Penang (vocal)

"Untuk Negeri Kita" (pronounced [untuʔ nəgəri kita]; "For Our State") is the state anthem of the Malaysian state of Penang. It was composed by the late Second Lieutenant Awaluddin Zainal Alam who submitted it to a competition made for selecting the state anthem. It won the competition on 15 November 1972 and was introduced and first played on 22 December the same year, during the birthday celebrations of the then Governor of Penang, Tun Syed Sheh Hassan Barakhbah at the City Stadium in the capital George Town.

The Penang state anthem was modified in 1993 from a slower tempo to its current, faster pace. This particular move, announced by the then Chief Minister of Penang, Koh Tsu Koon, was said to reflect the enthusiasm and dynamism of Penang's citizens towards the state's progress.

== Lyrics ==
Malay

Selamat Tuhan kurniakan,
Selamat Pulau Pinang,
Negeriku yang mulia,
Kutaat dan setia,
Aman dan bahagia.
Majulah, jayalah,
Negeriku yang ku-cinta,
Bersatu dan bersama,
Untuk negeri kita.

Jawi

سلامت توهن کورنياکن⹁
سلامت ڤولاو ڤينڠ⹁
نݢريکو يڠ موليا⹁
کوطاعة دان ستيا⹁
امان دان بهاݢيا.
ماجوله⹁ جايله⹁
نݢريکو يڠ کوچينتا⹁
برساتو دان برسام⹁
اونتوق نݢري کيت.

IPA (Note: See Help:IPA/Malay.)

[səlamat tuhan kurniakan]
[səlamat pulau pinaŋ]
[nəgəriku jaŋ mulia]
[kutaʔat dan sətia]
[aman dan bahagia]
[madʒulah dʒajalah]
[nəgəriku jaŋ kutʃinta]
[bərsatu dan bərsama]
[untuʔ nəgəri kita]

English

May God safety grant,
To Penang, our noble land,
We swear solemn to thee,
Ever faithful to be,
In peace and prosperity.
Progress ever sow,
To love this land is our fate,
All together come now,
For our beloved state.

== Use ==
At the start of all official functions held within the state of Penang, the state anthem of Penang must be played after the Malaysian national anthem, Negaraku. The state anthem must be sung according to the official Malay lyrics. The flag of Penang is also raised simultaneously with the singing of the state anthem. Every person present must stand at attention while singing the state anthem.

In addition, the state anthem is sung once a week in all national schools throughout Penang.
