= Amin, Amin, ya Rabaljalil =

State anthem of Perlis, Malaysia

Amin, Amin, ya Rabiljalil
English: Amen, Amen, o Majestic Lord
- Coat of arms of Perlis
- State anthem of Perlis
- Lyrics: Syed Hamzah ibni al-Marhum Syed Safi Jamalullail, 1930
- Music: Syed Hamzah ibni al-Marhum Syed Safi Jamalullail, transcribed by R. G. Iles, further revisions by Edgar Lenthall, 1930
- Adopted: 1935

Audio sample
- file; help

"Amin, Amin, ya Rabiljalil" (pronounced [amin amin ja rabaldʒalil]) is the anthem of Perlis, Malaysia. The lyrics are written in an admixture of Malay and Arabic.

== History ==
In 1930, Syed Hamzah ibni al-Marhum Syed Safi Jamalullail, the fifth Raja of Perlis, and at the time serving as Vice President of the Perlis State Council, composed the tune to Amin, Amin, ya Rabiljalil. Jamalullail then asked R. G. Iles, the State Engineer, to transcribe and harmonise it, since he was not proficient at reading or writing music.

Subsequently, the tune was orchestrated by Captain Edgar Lenthall, bandmaster for the Central Band of the Royal Malay Regiment. It would be adopted as state anthem of Perlis in 1935.

== Lyrics ==
Malay original [ New Lyrics ]

Amin, amin, ya Rabiljalil,
Doa hamba yang sangat zalil,
Tinggikan daulat serta adil,
Kekal perintah Jamalullail.

Jawi version

امين⹁ امين⹁ يا رب الجليل⹁
دعاء همبا يڠ ساڠت ذليل⹁
تيڠݢيکن دولت سرتا عاديل⹁
ککل ڤرينته جمال الليل.

IPA transcription (Note: See Help:IPA/Malay.)

[amin amin ja rɑbild͡ʒalil]
[doʔa hamba jaŋ saŋat zalil]
[tiŋgikan daulat sərta adil]
[kəkal pə‿rintah d͡ʒamalullail]

English translation

Amen, amen, O majestic Lord,
Hear the prayers of your wards,
Uphold he whom is just and sovereign,
May Jamalullail forever reign.
