= Allah Selamatkan Sultan Mahkota =

State anthem of Kedah, Malaysia

English: God Save the Crowned Sultan
- Coat of arms of Kedah
- State anthem of Kedah
- Lyrics: Almarhum Abdullah Syed Hussain, 1958
- Music: J. A. Redhill (Reutenberg)
- Adopted: 1937

Audio sample
- Allah Selamatkan Sultan Mahkota (instrumental): file; help

"Allah Selamat Sultan Mahkota" (chorus)
Official anthem of Kedah (vocal)

"Allah Selamatkan Sultan Mahkota" (pronounced [aɫ.ɫah sə.la.mat.kan sul.tan mah.ko.ta]) is the state anthem of Kedah, Malaysia. The lyrics were written by Almarhum Abdullah Syed Hussain Shahabuddin and it was composed by J. A. Redhill (Reutenberg). It was officially adopted on 22 March 1937.

== History ==
Reutenberg, a Russian Khazar and the then-Conductor of the Selangor Club Orchestra, had been ordered to compose a state anthem for Kedah with $1000 as the reward. He successfully composed it in 25 minutes time. The plan to create it was initiated by the British Adviser of Kedah, S.L. Jones.

The anthem was recomposed by Tunku Yakob with the addition of its lyrics written by Hj. Mohammad Sheriff, the then Menteri Besar and the melody from J.F. Agustin in 1949.

== Lyrics ==
Rumi Script	Jawi Script	IPA Transliteration	English
Allah selamat Sultan Mahkota, Berpanjangan usia di atas Takhta, Memelihara ugama Nabi kita, Negeri Kedah serata-rata.	الله سلامت سلطان مهكوتا، برڤنجاڠن اوسيا دأتس تختا، ممليهارا أڬام نبي كيت، نڬري قدح سراتا-رات	[ɑɫ.ɫɑh sə.la.mat sul.tan mah.ko.ta] [bər.pan.d͡ʒa.ŋan u.si‿a di a.tas tax.ta] [mə.me‿li.ha.ra u.ga.ma na.bi ki.ta] [nə.gə.ri kə.dah sə.rata.rata]	Allah save the Sultan crowned, Longevity bestow upon his throne, As he upholds our Prophet's faith, In all corners of Kedah state.
