= Johor State Anthem =

State anthem in Malaysia

Lagu Bangsa Johor
English: Johor State Anthem
- Coat of arms of Johor
- State anthem of Johor
- Lyrics: Hj. Mohamed Said Hj. Sulaiman, 1914
- Music: Mackertich Galistan Abdullah, 1897
- Adopted: 1897

Audio sample
- Lagu Bangsa Johor (instrumental): file; help

"Lagu Bangsa Johor" (chorus)
Official anthem of Johor (vocal)

The Johor State Anthem (Malay: Lagu Bangsa Johor, pronounced [lagu baŋsa dʒohor]), which was composed by Armenian bandmaster Mackertich Galistan Abdullah, had no official lyrics until 1914 when a staff member of the Hong Kong Bank in Johor Bahru, Hubert Allen Courtney, wrote the first English words and Haji Mohamed Said Hj. Sulaiman rewrote it in Malay. It was adapted from the famous Malay tune Dondang Sayang and officially approved and adopted by Sultan Ibrahim in 1897.

== Lyrics ==
Malay
Jawi
IPA transcription (Note: See Help:IPA/Malay.)
English
Lagu Bangsa Johor

Allah peliharakan Sultan
'Nugerahkan dia segala kehormatan
Sihat dan ria, kekal dan makmur
Luaskan kuasa menaungkan kami
Rakyat dipimpini berzaman lagi
Dengan merdeka bersatu hati
Allah berkati Johor
Allah selamatkan Sultan.

ﷲ ڤليهاراکن سلطان
انوݢرهکن دي سݢالا کحرمتن
صيحت دان ريا⹁ ککل دان معمور
لواسکن کواس مناءوڠکن کامي
رعيت دڤيمڤيني برزمان لاݢي
دڠن مرديک برساتو هاتي
ﷲ برکتي جوهر
ﷲ سلامتکن سلطان.

[ʔɑɫ'ɫɑːh pəliˈharəkan ˈsultan]
[nuɡəˈrahkan ˈdiə səˈɡalə kəˈhomatan]
[ˈsihat dan ˈriə ˈkəkal dan ˈmakmo]
[lu‿askan ku‿asə məˈnaʊŋkan kami]
[raʔjat diˈpimpini bərˈzaman ˈlaɡi]
[ˈdəŋan mərˈdeka bərˈsatu ˈhati]
[ʔɑɫ'ɫɑːh bərˈkati ˈd͡ʒoho]
[ʔɑɫ'ɫɑːh səˈlamatkan ˈsultan]

God preserve the Sultan
Grant that honour, health and happiness
May be with him ever more!
Long may his hand protect our land
and lead his people on; Through years to be
in freedom and in unity
God bless Johor
God save the Sultan.
