= Sabah Tanah Airku =

State anthem of Sabah, Malaysia

English: Sabah, My Homeland
- State anthem of Sabah
- Music: H.B. Hermann
- Adopted: 1963

Audio sample
- "Sabah Tanah Airku" (Instrumental): file; help

"Sabah Tanah Airku" (chorus)
Official anthem of Sabah (vocal)

Sabah Tanah Airku (pronounced [sabah tanah airku]; "Sabah, My Homeland") is the official state anthem of Sabah, Malaysia that was composed by HB Hermann, a Singaporean resident who submitted it to a competition made for selecting the state anthem. It won the competition on 16 May 1963 and was aired for the first time on 18 July of that year. It became the state anthem upon Sabah's accession to the Federation of Malaysia on 16 September that same year.

On 1 January 1996, a faster tempo to the state anthem were introduced.

== Lyrics ==
Rumi script

Sabah, tanah airku
Negeri kita yang tercinta
Pemuda-pemudi
Semua marilah
Bangunlah bersatu semua
Marilah bersama serta maju jaya
Merdeka sepanjang masa
Bersatu segala bangsa sentosa
Sabah negeri merdeka.

Jawi script

سابه تانه ايرکو
نݢري کيت يڠ ترچينتا
ڤمودا-ڤمود سموا ماريله
باڠونله برساتو سموا
ماريله برسام سرتا ماجو جاي
مرديک سڤنجڠ ماس
برساتو سݢالا بڠسا سنتوسا
سابه نݢري مرديک

IPA transcription (Note: See Help:IPA/Malay.)

[sabah tanah airku]
[nəgəri kita jaŋ tərtʃinta]
[pəmuda pəmudi]
[səmua marilah]
[baŋunlah bərsatu səmua]
[marilah bərsama sərta madʒu dʒaja]
[mərdeka səpandʒaŋ masa]
[bərsatu səgala baŋsa səntosa]
[sabah nəgəri mərdeka]

English transcription

Sabah, my homeland
Our beloved state
Youngsters
Hereby make it known
Arise all together
Come together to be successful
Liberty for all time
From all the nations let one arise
Sabah, the independent state
