= Duli Yang Maha Mulia =

State anthem of Selangor, Malaysia

English: Your Royal Highness
- Coat of arms of Selangor
- State anthem of Selangor
- Music: Saiful Bahri
- Adopted: 1967

Audio sample
- Duli Yang Maha Mulia (instrumental): file; help

"Duli Yang Maha Mulia" (chorus)
Official anthem of Selangor (vocal)

Duli Yang Maha Mulia (pronounced [du.li jaŋ ma.ha mu.li.a]) is the title of the state anthem of Selangor, Malaysia. It was adopted in 1967. The writer of the lyrics is unknown. The music was written by Saiful Bahri, who also wrote and composed the Malaccan state anthem, Melaka Maju Jaya.

The phrase is a royal title, equivalent to "His Royal Highness". It is used to refer to state rulers in Malaysia. This royal title is used especially on the heads of states of Negeri Sembilan, Selangor, Perlis, Terengganu, Kedah, Kelantan, Pahang, Johor, and Perak.

== History ==
The first state anthem of Selangor was composed in 1908. It was a re-interpretation of the folk song Chantek Manis by Daniel Ortega. The lyrics to that are as follows:

ALLAH selamatkan Duli Yang Maha Mulia,
Kekal dan selamat di-atas Takhta,
Panjangkan umur dan aman sentosa,
Adil mewah murah memerintah rata,
Daulat!

In 1967, Sultan Salahuddin Abdul Aziz Shah, then the Sultan of Selangor, announced that the song would be replaced with the present anthem.

== Lyrics ==
Malay in Rumi
Malay in Jawi
IPA translation (Note: See Help:IPA/Malay.)
Translation
Duli Yang Maha Mulia

Duli Yang Maha Mulia
Selamat di atas takhta
ALLAH lanjutkan usia Tuanku
Rakyat mohon restu bawah Duli Tuanku
Bahagia selama-lamanya
Aman dan sentosa
Duli Yang Maha Mulia.

دولي يڠ مها موليا
سلامت دأتس تختا
الله لنجوتکن اوسيا توانکو
رعيت موهون رستو باوه دولي توانکو
بهاݢيا سلاما-لاماڽ
امان دان سنتوسا
دولي يڠ مها موليا

[du.li jaŋ ma.ha mu.li.a]
[sə.la.mat di a.tas tax.ta]
[aɫ'ɫaːh lan.d͡ʒut.kan u.sia tu.an.ku]
[raʔ.jat mo.hon rəs.tu ba.wah du.li tu.an.ku]
[ba.ha.gi.a sə.la.ma la.ma.ɲa]
[a.man dan sən.to.sa]
[du.li jaŋ ma.ha mu.li‿a]

Your Royal Highness
Safe on Your throne
May ALLAH grant you long life
The people ask for blessings
From you, The Highness
Forever fortunate
Peaceful and serene
Your Royal Highness.
