= Terengganu State Anthem =

State anthem of Terengganu, Malaysia

Selamat Sultan
English: (God) Save The Sultan
- Coat of arms of Terengganu
- State anthem of Terengganu
- Lyrics: Mohamad Hashim bin Abu Bakar, 1927
- Music: Mohamad Hashim bin Abu Bakar, 1927
- Adopted: 1927

Audio sample
- Instrumental: file; help

"Selamat Sultan" (chorus)
Official anthem of Terengganu (vocal)

"(God) Save The Sultan" (Malay: Selamat Sultan, pronounced [səlamat sultan]) is the official state anthem of Terengganu, Malaysia. It was composed by Mohamad Hashim bin Abu Bakar in 1927, an Assistant Teacher at the Malay Primary School at Paya Bunga. He also wrote the lyrics.

== History ==
In 1927, Sultan Sulaiman Badrul Alam Shah instructed Mohamad Hashim bin Abu Bakar to compose a tune, which was to be played on the occasion of His Highness's birthday. Abu Bakar was then the leader of a Boy Scout band in Kuala Terengganu and later Bandmaster of the Terengganu Police Band. The music which he composed with accompanying words were submitted to the late Dato Sri Andika Di Raja, who was Aide-de-Camp to the Sultan and also a member of the Council of Ministers, and a few days later Abu Bakar was commanded to appear outside the Istana Kolam (Royal Palace), and he sang the anthem to the accompaniment of the Band of the Sultan Sulaiman Boy Scouts Troop in His Highness's presence. Not long afterwards Abu Bakar trained a group of school children from Paya Bunga to sing the anthem and after he sang it a second time the Sultan accepted the music and words as the Terengganu State Anthem and commanded that Abu Bakar should be rewarded.

=== Japanese Occupation ===
A slight amendment was made to the fourth and sixth lines during the Japanese occupation but the music and the rest of the words remained as they were originally composed.

== Lyrics ==
Malay
Jawi
IPA transcription (Note: See Help:IPA/Malay.)
Translation
Selamat Sultan

Allah daulatkan Tuanku Sultan
Terengganu Darul Iman
Allah peliharakan Tuanku Sultan
Sejahtera sepanjang zaman
Allah rahmatkan Tuanku Sultan
Memerintah rakyat aman.

الله دولتکن توانکو سلطان
ترڠݢانو دارالإيمان
الله ڤليهاراکن توانکو سلطان
سجهترا سڤنجڠ زمان
الله رحمتکن توانکو سلطان
ممرينته رعيت امان

[allah daulatkan tuanku sultan]
[tərəŋɡanu darul iman allah pəliharakan]
[tuanku sultan]
[sədʒahtəra səpandʒaŋ zaman]
[allah rahmatkan tuanku sultan]
[məmərintah raʔjat aman]

God bestow upon His Majesty sovereignty
Terengganu the Abode of Faith
God cherish His Majesty
Blissful throughout his reign
God bless His Majesty
Govern the People in peace.
