= Kelantan =

State of Malaysia

Kelantan Klate
- State
- State of Kelantan; Negeri Kelantan (Malay)
- Flag Coat of arms
- Nicknames: Negeri Che Siti Wan Kembang (State of Che Siti Wan Kembang); Tanah Serendah Sekebun Bunga (Land of Flower Beds); Darul Naim (Abode of Bliss)
- Motto: Berserah Kepada Tuhan Kerajaan Kelantan "The Kingdom of Kelantan Surrenders to God"
- Anthem: Selamat Sultan "(God) Save The Sultan"
- Kelantan in Malaysia
- Country: Malaysia
- The earliest recorded kingdom: 100 BC
- Patani control: 1603
- Siamese control: 1786
- Kelantan Sultanate: 1800
- British control: 1909
- Japanese occupation: 1942
- Malayan Declaration of Independence: 31 August 1957
- Proclamation of Malaysia: 16 September 1963
- Capital and largest city: Kota Bharu; 6°8′N 102°15′E
- Royal capital: Kubang Kerian
- Official languages: Malay
- Recognised regional languages: Kelantan Malay; Temiar; Jahai; Bateq; Tak Bai Thai
- Ethnic groups (2020): 96.6% Bumiputera; 2.5% Chinese; 0.3% Indian; 0.6% Other ethnicities
- Religion (2020): 95.5% Sunni Islam (official); 2.8% Buddhism; 0.9% No religion; 0.4% Christianity; 0.2% Hinduism; 0.2% Others
- Demonym(s): Kelantanese/Oghe Klate
- Government: Federated parliamentary constitutional monarchy
  - Sultan: Muhammad V
  - Menteri Besar: Mohd Nassuruddin Daud (PN–PAS)
  - Deputy Menteri Besar: Mohamed Fadzli Hassan
- Legislature: Legislative Assembly

Area
  - Total: 15,040 km^{2} (5,810 sq mi)
- Highest elevation (Mount Yong Belar): 2,181 m (7,156 ft)

Population
  - 2020 census: 1,792,501
  - Density: 119/km^{2} (308.2/sq mi) (11th)
- GDP (PPP): 2023 estimate
  - Total: $21.871 billion (13th)
  - Per capita: $11,773 (15th)
- GDP (nominal): 2023 estimate
  - Total: $6.859 billion (13th)
  - Per capita: $3,692 (15th)
- Gini (2022): ▲0.385 low
- HDI (2024): ▲0.763 high · 16th
- Currency: Malaysian ringgit (RM/MYR)
- Time zone: UTC+8 (Malaysian Time)
- Date format: dd-mm-yyyy
- Driving side: Left
- Calling code: 09
- Postal code: 15xxx to 18xxx
- ISO 3166 code: MY-03
- Website: kelantan.gov.my

Kelantan (Malay pronunciation: [kəˈlantan]; Kelantanese Malay: Klate; Kelantanese Malay pronunciation: [kläˈtɛ]) is a state in Malaysia. The capital, Kota Bharu, includes the royal seat of Kubang Kerian. The honorific name of the state is Darul Naim ("The Blissful Abode"). Kelantan is located in the north-eastern corner of Peninsular Malaysia. Kelantan is an agrarian state with paddy fields, fishing villages and casuarina-lined beaches. Kelantan is home to some of the most ancient archaeological discoveries in Malaysia, including several prehistoric aboriginal settlements.

Due to Kelantan's relative isolation and largely rural lifestyle, Kelantanese culture differs somewhat from Malay culture in the rest of the peninsula; this is reflected in the cuisine, arts and the unique Kelantanese Malay language, which is not readily intelligible with standard Malay.

Kelantan is bordered by Narathiwat province of Thailand to the north, Terengganu to the south-east, Perak to the west and Pahang to the south. To the north-east of Kelantan is the South China Sea. Kelantan has diverse tropical rainforests and an equatorial climate. The state's mountain ranges belong to the Titiwangsa Mountains, which are part of the Tenasserim Hills that span southern Myanmar, southern Thailand and Peninsular Malaysia, with Mount Yong Belar being the state's highest point.

== Etymology ==
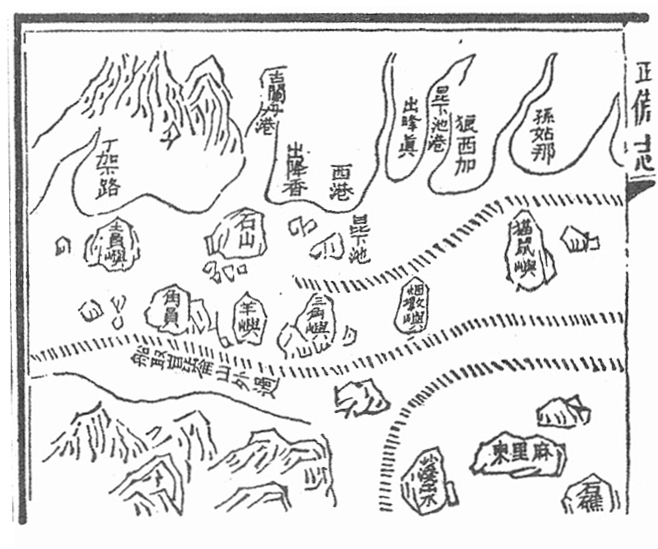
The 17th century Mao Kun map from Wubei Zhi which is based on the early 15th century navigation maps of Zheng He showing Kelantan river estuary (吉蘭丹港)

There are a number of theories for the origin of the name Kelantan. One theory proposes that the word Kelantan comes from a modified version of the word gelam hutam, the Malay word for the cajuput, or swamp tea tree (Melaleuca leucadendron). Other theories claim that the name comes from the Malay word kilatan, "shiny or glittery" or kolam tanah, "clay pool". Kelantan was called Kalantan (Thai: กลันตัน) by the Siamese when it was under their influence.

== History ==
=== Prehistoric ===
Kelantan's early history is not very clear, but archaeological evidence shows human settlement in prehistoric times.

=== Pre-Malaccan Era ===
Early Kelantan had links to the Funan Kingdom, the Khmer Empire, Srivijaya, Majapahit, Champa and Siam. Around 1411, there was an Islamic ruler named Raja Kumar and Kelantan was an important centre of trade at that time.

=== Kelantan Sultanate ===
In 1499, Kelantan became a vassal state of the Malacca Sultanate. With the fall of Malacca in 1511, Kelantan was divided up and ruled by petty chieftains, paying tribute to Patani, then a powerful Malay Kingdom of the eastern peninsula. By the early 17th century, most of these Kelantanese chiefs became subject to Patani. The legendary Cik Siti Wan Kembang was said to have reigned over Kelantan between 1610 and 1667. Kelantan made a political alliance with Patani during the reign of Raja Biru in 1619 for mutual trade and military interests. The Queen of Patani was deposed in 1651 by the Raja of Kelantan, starting a period of Kelantanese rule in Patani.

The flag of Kelantan before 1924

Around 1760, Long Yunus, an aristocratic warlord of Patani origin succeeded in unifying the territory of present-day Kelantan and was enthroned by his father-in-law Ku Tanang Wangsa (Regent of Terengganu) as Yang di-Pertuan Muda or Deputy Ruler of Kelantan. Long Yunus was succeeded in 1795 by his son-in-law Tengku Muhammad by Sultan Mansur of Terengganu. The enthronement of Tengku Muhammad by Terengganu was opposed by Long Yunus' sons, triggering a war against Terengganu by Long Muhammad, the eldest son of Long Yunus. The pro-Terengganu faction was defeated in 1800 and Long Muhammad ruled Kelantan with the new title of Sultan as Sultan Muhammad I.

Later, when the Sultan died childless, it triggered another civil war among claimants to the throne. His nephew Long Senik Mulut Merah, triumphed over his uncles and cousins and assumed the throne in 1835 as Sultan Muhammad II.

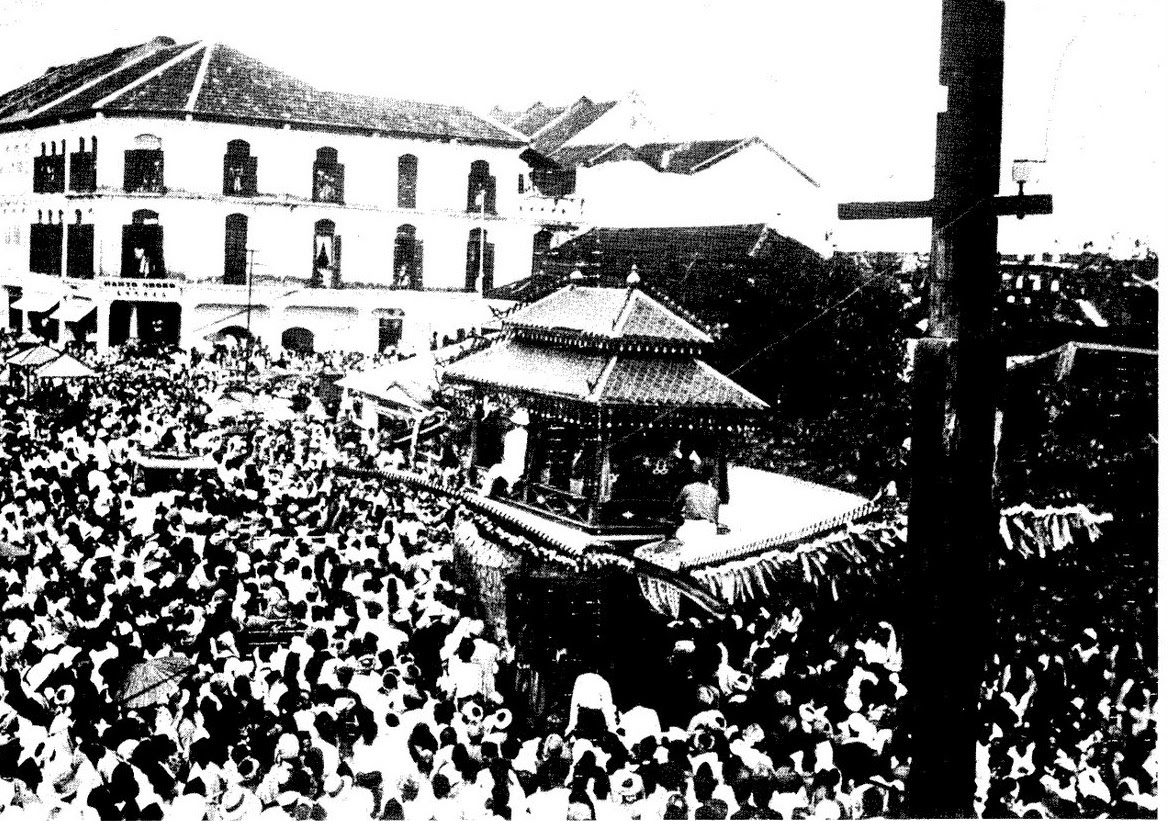
Thousands flocked into the streets of Kota Bharu to witness the Burung Petala Procession in 1933.

Sultan Muhammad II used his loose alliance with Siam to form the modern Kelantan state, centered in his new fort on the eastern bank of the Kelantan river, which became Kota Bharu in 1844.

=== Unfederated Malay States ===
Under the terms of the Anglo-Siamese Treaty of 1909, the Thais relinquished their claims over Kelantan, Terengganu, Kedah and Perlis to the British Empire, and Kelantan thus became one of the Unfederated Malay States with a British Adviser.

=== Japanese occupation ===
Kelantan was where the Japanese first landed during their invasion of Malaya, on 8 December 1941. In 1943, Kelantan was transferred by the Japanese to Thailand and became a province of Thailand. Kelantan reverted to Malaya upon the end of World War II in August 1945.

=== Malayan Union and the Federation of Malaya ===
Kelantan became part of the Malayan Union in 1946 and then the Federation of Malaya on 1 February 1948, and together with other Malayan states attained independence on 31 August 1957. On 16 September 1963, Kelantan became one of the states of Malaysia.

=== Modern history ===
The Malaysian Islamic Party (PAS) came to power in Kelantan for the first time in 1959. In November 1977, the federal government declared a state of emergency in Kelantan following a political crisis and street violence. An election took place soon after the emergency, in which the United Malays National Organisation (UMNO) won removing the PAS from power. Kelantan was then governed by the Barisan Nasional coalition (of which UMNO was part of) until the 1990 General Election when the PAS returned with an overwhelming victory, winning all 39 State and 13 Parliamentary seats. The success was achieved through the PAS-led coalition, called Angkatan Perpaduan Ummah (APU). In the following General Election in 1995, PAS won again, though with a reduced majority. The PAS won a large victory in 1999 due in part to Malayan anger over the treatment of former Deputy Prime Minister Anwar Ibrahim by Prime Minister Mahathir Mohamad and other officials of the national government. In 2004 the PAS nearly lost control of Kelantan, retaining it with only a 1-seat majority, when the Barisan Nasional, under the new leadership of Abdullah Badawi following Mahathir's retirement, won by a landslide nationally. However, after the 2008 Malaysian general election, the PAS regained a two-thirds majority of seats in the state assembly.

== Geography ==
Rising high on the slopes of Gunung Korbu, the second highest peak in Peninsular Malaysia, the Nengiri River flows east to merge first with the Galas, and then with the Lebir — the latter begins in the Taman Negara National Park — before turning decisively northwards and emptying into the shallow waters of the South China Sea. From Kuala Krai the conjoined streams become the Kelantan River (also known as Sungai Kelantan), a broad, mud-coloured stream which dominates the fertile coastal plains and defines the geography of the region. The Kelantan River valley is a fertile rice-bowl, rich in hardwoods and rubber and lush with tropical fruits.

For centuries, Kelantan was mostly separated from the rest of the country by the Titiwangsa Mountains, which runs from north to south through the peninsula. Weeks of hard travel were required to reach Kelantan. The easiest way to Kelantan was to sail around the peninsula. For this reason Kelantan's history often involves the sea and boats. Even today, many of its people are tied to the sea.

A railway line was built in the 1920s, during British colonial rule, linking Tumpat on the state's northern coast, through the jungles of upper Kelantan and Pahang and then on to other states. Also, between the 1920s and 1980s, trunk roads were built to link Kelantan with adjacent states. Presently, one can travel by road from the capital city Kuala Lumpur to Kota Bharu using national highway 8 through the mountain range within 8 hours.

=== Climate ===
Kelantan has a tropical climate, with temperatures from 21 to 32 °C and intermittent rain throughout the year. The wet season is the east-coast monsoon season from November to January.

=== Environment ===
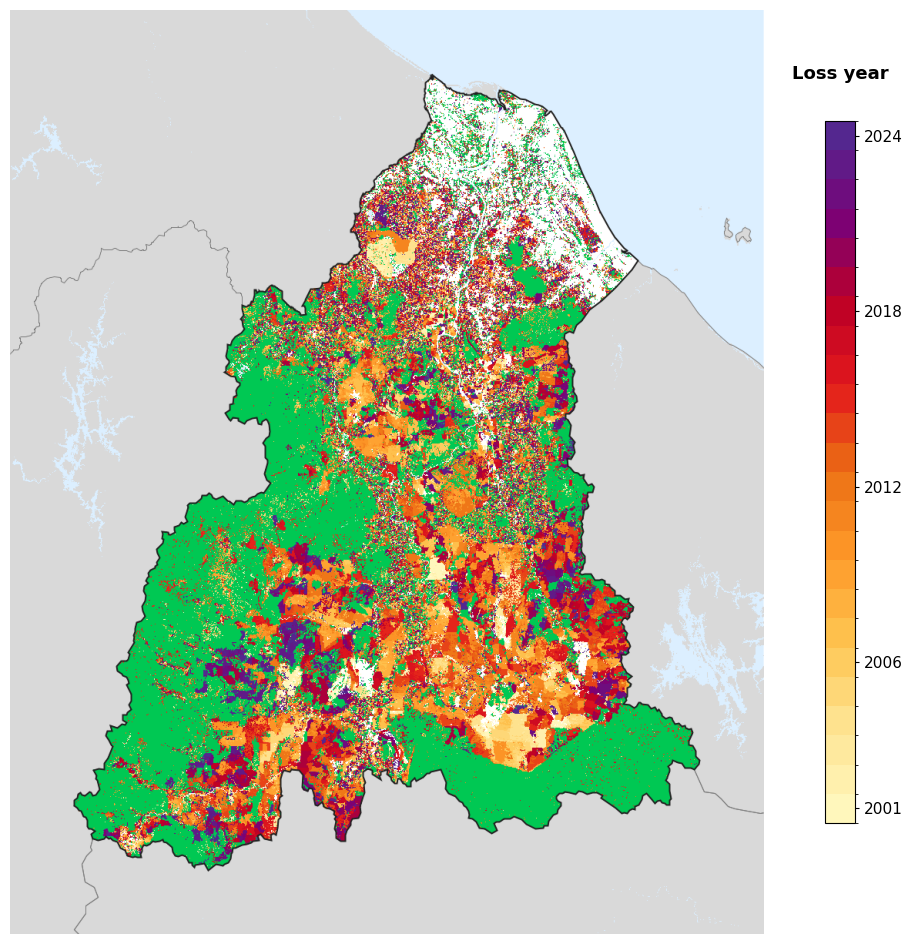
Tree-cover loss year in Kelantan, 2001-2024, from the Global Forest Change dataset

Some experts claim groundwater extraction is causing land in Kelantan to lower, causing more floods.

== Economy ==
Kelantan has a chiefly agrarian economy dominated by rice, rubber and tobacco. Fishing along its 96-kilometre coastline is also an important economic activity. Cottage industries which employ traditional skills in handicraft production such as batik, woodcarving and songket weaving are also evident. Logging activities are active given the vast remaining area of forest. In recent years, tourism, especially to offshore islands, has increased in importance. A few reputable hotels have been established and more modern shopping malls have been opened to cater to urban populations.

Kota Bharu, the capital, is the major urban centre, and there are also plans to open up the southern portion of the state under an ambitious multimillion-dollar development project. The main market at the city centre is a top attraction.

Kelantan had a GDP per capita in 2006 at RM7,985. The State Socioeconomic Report 2017 published on 26 July 2018 reported that Kelantan has a GDP per capita of RM13,593 in 2017, significantly lower than any other state in Malaysia.

Kelantan's cultural ties with Pattani make use of the Malaysian-Thai border, where Kelantanese and Southern Thais cross frequently to visit their relatives and transport goods for small business.

== Governance and politics ==
Kelantan is a constitutional monarchy, as guaranteed by the highest form of law of the state – the Laws of the Constitution of Kelantan, with a ruler elected by the Council of Succession (Majlis Perajaan Negeri). The sultan is the constitutional head of Kelantan. The current sultan of Kelantan is Muhammad V (born Tengku Muhammad Faris Petra), who acceded to the throne on 13 September 2010. The main royal palace for the sultan is the Istana Negeri (State Palace), while the consort's is the Istana Mahkota (Crown Palace) and the crown prince's is the Istana Kota Lama (Old Fortress Palace). Other palaces are the Istana Balai Besar (Grand Hall Palace), Istana Telipot, Istana Bukit Tanah, Istana Bukit Jahar and Istana Batu. All palaces except for Istana Bukit Tanah (located in Tumpat are located in the state capital. Of all the eight royal palaces, two of these are currently functioning as Royal Museums.

=== Executive ===
The state government is headed by a Menteri Besar (Chief Minister), assisted by an 11-member Executive Council (Exco) selected from the members of the Kelantan State Legislative Assembly.

=== Legislature ===
The 45-seat Assembly is the legislative branch of Kelantan's government, responsible for making laws in matters regarding the state. It is based on the Westminster system. Members of the Assembly are elected by citizens every five years by universal suffrage. The Menteri Besar (Chief Minister) is appointed on the basis of their ability to command a majority in the Assembly. The majority (42 seats) is currently held by Perikatan Nasional (PN).

Affiliation	Coalition/party leader	Status	Seats	
Affiliation	Coalition/party leader	Status	2023 election	Current
Perikatan Nasional	Mohd Nassuruddin Daud	Government	43	42
Pakatan Harapan; Barisan Nasional	Mohd Syahbuddin Hashim	Opposition	2	3
Government majority			41	39

=== Kelantan under PAS administration ===
A part of the conservative Malay heartland, Kelantan has been ruled by the Malaysian Islamic Party (PAS) since 1990. It is one of four Malaysian states led by PAS after the 2022 elections, the others being Terengganu, Kedah, and Perlis.

Almost all PAS members are Malay Muslims, as are about 97% of Kelantan's population.

For years, the PAS has attempted to impose a strict interpretation of Islamic Law on Kelantan. It has successfully imposed certain social strictures such as single-sex supermarket queues, separate public benches for men and women, and limiting entertainment centers to prohibit "salacious behavior." An Islamic regional law such as caning for unmarried couples doing cohabitation (khalwat), amputation of limbs for thievery, execution for murder, and stoning for adultery (collectively known as Hudud Law) have been passed and enacted into law, however, have been unenforced by the national government on constitutional grounds.

One of the most controversial steps that PAS have taken in Kelantan is to place strict restrictions or outright bans on the traditional performance of syncretic Malay theatrical forms, such as Wayang Kulit, Mak Yong, Dikir Barat, and Main Puteri. PAS also took action to remove any sculpture that looked like human or animal, modified versions without the traditional references to Hindu dewa–dewi and traditional Malay hantu (spirits or ghosts) and otherwise in keeping with orthodox Islam are, however, tolerated in some instances. Also restricted are public performances by women: Aside from Quran recitals, such arrangements are entirely banned if men are in the audience. While PAS has maintained that these steps were to promote Islam and put an end to immoral behavior among the Muslim population, many consider them an act of defiance against Barisan Nasional's laws — which are more tolerant, depending on one's viewpoint — and also a significant loss to Malay traditional arts.

A 2019 directive from the office of the Sultan prohibited state government buildings from displaying portraits of individuals other than the Sultan, Crown Prince, previous Sultan, and the state's First Minister. This was quickly amended also to allow images of the Malaysian King and Queen.

PAS has also defended the practice of child marriage, a practice that been the focus of recent controversy due to recent cases in Kelantan.

=== The 1975 Oil royalties dispute ===
On 9 May 1975, an agreement was signed between the Menteri Besar of Kelantan, Datuk Mohamed Nasir, and the Chairman of Petronas, Tengku Razaleigh Hamzah. According to the terms of the agreement, Kelantan was to receive a cash payment of 5 percent a year biannually, for any oil found in Kelantan or its coastal areas. In return, Kelantan grants Petronas to exclusive rights to "petroleum whether lying onshore or offshore of Malaysia".

It became an issue as to whether Kelantan had the right to claim oil royalties from federal government as described in the agreement. Relevant to the issue, in Schedule 9, List I of the Federal Constitution, the following topics are assigned to the Federal Government:

- Except as to State rights over permits and licences, the Federal Government has rights over development of mineral resources, mines, mining, minerals and mineral ores, oils and oilfields, petroleum products, safety in mines and oilfields
- Gas and gasworks, production and distribution of power and energy
- Foreign and extraterritorial jurisdiction
- Treaties, agreements and conventions with other countries and all matters which bring the Federation into relations with any other country

As for the state government:

- Land: Schedule 9 List II, Para 2(a). Under the Interpretation Acts, 1948 and 1967, Section 3, land includes "the surface of the earth ... all substances therein... all vegetations and other natural products... whether on or below the surface... and land covered by water". The territorial waters of Kelantan will come within the definition of "land covered by water". Territorial waters are defined by Section 4(2) of the Emergency (Essential Powers) Ordinance No 7, 1969. Subject to some exceptions, they refer to three nautical miles.
- Revenue from lands: Schedule 10, Part III Para 2.
- In addition to the income from land, one notes that in Article 110[3A] there is provision for discretionary payment on such terms and conditions as maybe prescribed by or under federal law of the export duty on "mineral oils" produced in the state. Petroleum comes within the meaning of "mineral oils" under Section 10 of the Petroleum Development Act.

From the schedule, Peninsular Malaysian states have the constitutional right to set fees for permits and licences for extraction of any petroleum that is derived from their land and territorial waters. Anything beyond territorial waters, such as on the continental shelf, is entirely in federal hands. However, because exploration of oil and gas is approximately 150 km from Kota Bharu and beyond the territorial water of Kelantan. Emeritus Professor Shad Saleem Faruqi concluded that Kelantan has no constitutional right to regulate it and to receive compensation for it. He further argued given the agreement deed to support Kelantan rights over royalties will render as unconstitutional and void under the doctrine of severability (constitutional parts of the law remain even if other parts are unconstitutional), as the Assignment by Kelantan gives to Petronas the ownership of all petroleum "whether lying onshore or offshore of Malaysia" was an overstatement, and Kelantan has no rights to what lies off the shores of the whole of Malaysia.

States cannot transfer rights over something they do not own. Unfortunately for Kelantan, the matter cannot end with the two agreements. There is a supreme Constitution in Malaysia with a federal-state division of legislative and financial powers. The constitutional allocation cannot be altered except by constitutionally permitted procedures and amendments. Even mutual agreements cannot override the constitutional scheme of things because jurisdiction is a matter of law and not of consent or acquiescence.

The Kelantan state government is owed between RM850 million and RM1 billion from oil revenue royalties from the central government, according to the Petroleum Act 1974. In 2009, the central government offered 'compensation' or Wang Ehsan, a fraction of the sum actually owed. Discrimination of Kelantan on the matter has led the state government considering action in the International Court of Justice (ICJ). Support for Kelantan and the local government in defiance of the central government includes the group Kelantan Peoples' Movement Demanding Petroleum Royalties or Gerakan Menuntut Royalti Petroleum Rakyat Kelantan (GMR).

=== Administrative divisions ===
Kelantan is the only state in Peninsular Malaysia that does not use the Arab-Malay term "Daerah" for its second-level administrative divisions, also known as districts. Instead, these divisions are known by the local term "Jajahan", roughly translated as collectivities, colonised lands or colonies. The term originates from several historical accounts that Kelantan was a feudal state divided into separate petty territories local rulers, until these were conquered and became united under one sultan.

Modern State of Kelantan is divided into 10 districts, 311 mukims, and 12 local government areas (LGA). Lojing is an autonomous sub-district under Gua Musang District. Most districts have a single local government, excepting Kota Bharu and Kuala Krai, each divided into two local councils: Kota Bharu and Ketereh in Kota Bharu District and Kuala Krai and Dabong in Kuala Krai District.

Administrative divisions in Kelantan
UPI code	Districts	Seat	Mukims	Area (km^{2})	Population (2021)
0301	Bachok	Bachok	32	279	158,900
0302	Kota Bharu	Kota Bharu	89	403	568,900
0303	Machang	Machang	22	526	112,900
0304	Pasir Mas	Pasir Mas	48	570	233,400
0305	Pasir Puteh	Pasir Puteh	33	423	137,400
0306	Tanah Merah	Tanah Merah	18	880	152,400
0307	Tumpat	Tumpat	29	180	183,100
0308	Gua Musang	Gua Musang	16	8,179	113,200
0310	Kuala Krai	Kuala Krai	17	2,275	105,900
0311	Jeli	Jeli	7	1,326	55,600
0312	Lojing	–	7	–	–

== Demographics ==
Historical population
Year	Pop.	±%
1970	684,738	—
1980	859,270	+25.5%
1991	1,181,315	+37.5%
2000	1,287,367	+9.0%
2010	1,470,696	+14.2%
2020	1,792,501	+21.9%

The largely rural state preserves Malay traditions such as kite-flying contests, top-spinning contests, and bird singing competitions, and traditional handicrafts such as batik, songket, and silver crafts. As of 2020, Kelantan's ethnic composition is 96.6% Malay, 2.5% Chinese, 0.3% Indian and 0.6% others.

The ethnicities of Kelantan generally live together harmoniously. For example, members of the Thai community received a permit to build a very large statue of the Buddha without any objection from the Malay community or the PAS government that granted the permit.

=== Ethnic groups ===
==== Malays ====
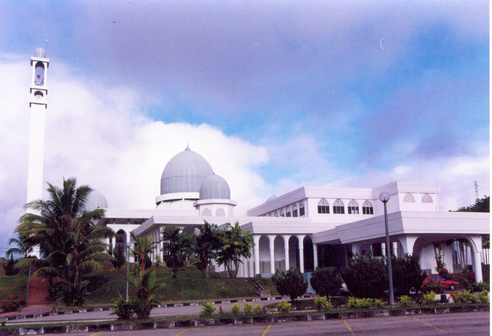
Tengku Muhammad Faiz Petra Mosque

Kelantanese Malays are the predominant ethnic group in the state. They speak Kelantanese Malay which is distinguished from standard Malay as well as other Malay varieties in Malaysia by its unique grammar, pronunciation and figures of speech.

Kelantanese Malay is somewhat mutually intelligible with other Malay dialects. Jawi script, which has less influence in other parts of Malaysia, is still widely used in writing and printing the Malay language in Kelantan. Signboards in Kelantan are written in both Jawi and Romanised Malay. To a certain extent, the Southern Thai language is also used.

95.7% of Kelantan's population are ethnic Malays, and under the Malaysian Constitution, all Malays are Muslims; therefore, Islam is the largest religion in the state.

Kota Bharu, as the state capital, is a popular centre for pursuits such as silat, martial arts, and kertok drumming. Here, too, more than any other place in Malaysia, the traditional pastimes of top-spinning — known as gasing — and the flying of giant, elaborately decorated kites called wau, is still observed.

==== Siamese ====
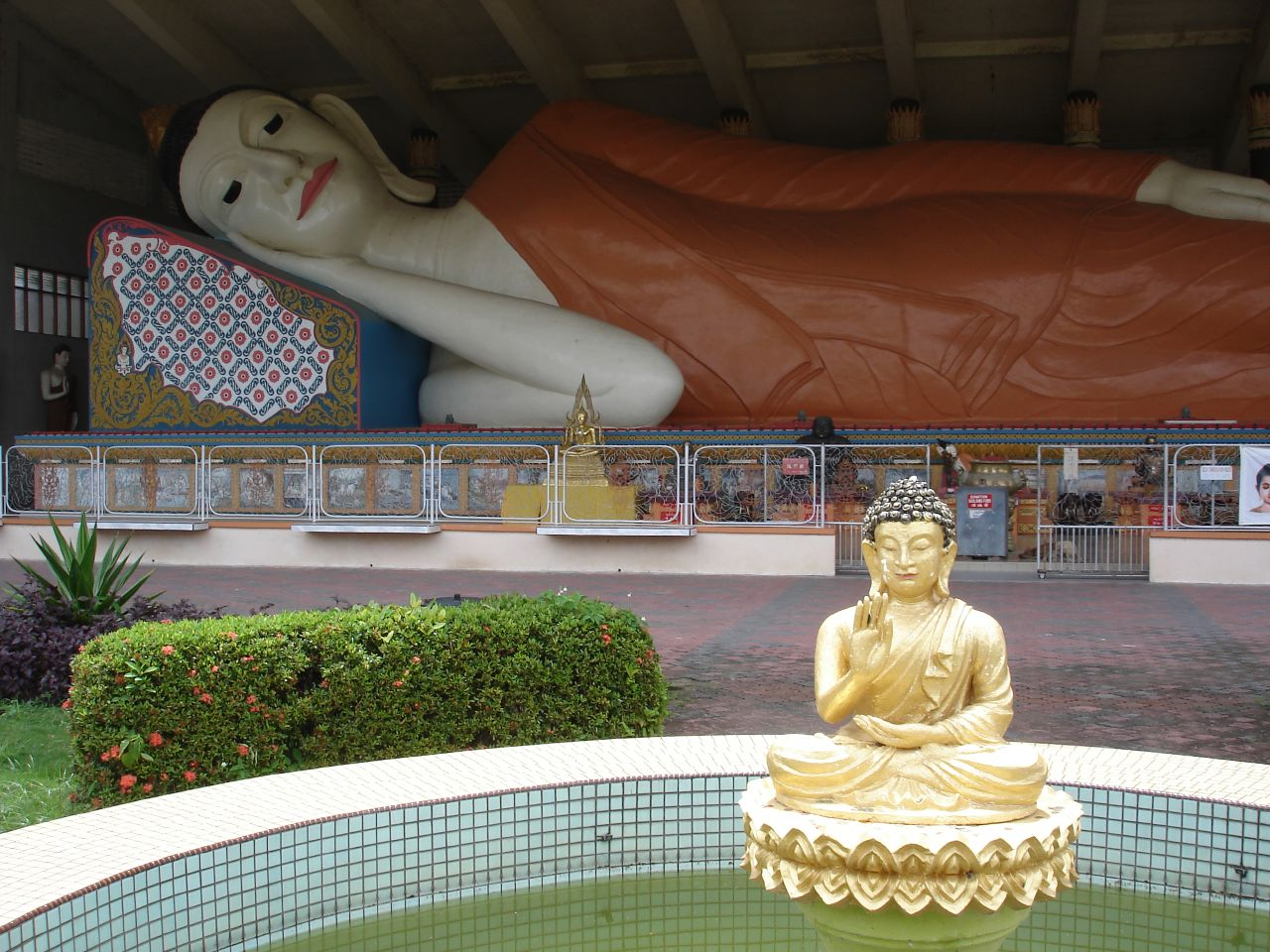
Reclining Buddha in Wat Photivihan

The minority ethnic Malaysian Siamese inhabitants of Kelantan are mostly centred around the coastal town of Tumpat, which is home to most of the state's two hundred or so Buddhist temples, and has a number of relatively well-off Siamese villages.

The dialect of the Thai language spoken in Kelantan is called Tak Bai, after the southernmost coastal town Tak Bai of Narathiwat province, just across the Golok River from Malaysia. The Tak Bai dialect differs substantially from standard southern Thai and other regional Thai dialects, and it seems certain that the Kelantan Thais are the descendants of an original enclave of Narathiwat settlers established in sparsely populated Malay territory as long as four centuries ago.

Buddhism is also visible in the hundreds of Thai wats, also known as ketik, found throughout the state. Since 1980, the longest statue of a reclining Buddha in Southeast Asia can be found in Wat Photivihan, in Tumpat. This temple is very popular with pilgrims and devotees. The Metta chanting uses the original Pali language or a Thai translation. About a thousand visitors attend the Wat for such religious celebrations as Tok'katinna, Loy Krathong, Saibat and Songkran.

==== Chinese ====
In Kelantan, the Kelantanese Chinese see themselves as either Cino Kapong (village Chinese) or Cino Bandar (town/urban Chinese).

The "village Chinese" are Hokkien migrants that set up houses along the Kelantan River up to 8–9 generations, or over 160 years ago. Chinese villages in Kelantan include Kampung Tok'kong (300-year-old temple), Batu Jong, Kampung Jelatok, Kampung Joh, Kampung Temangan, Kampung Mata Ayer, Kampung Tawang, Kampung Balai, and Gua Musang. Descendants of the earlier waves of small-scale migration are known as oghe Cino kito (our own Chinese) and the elders are seen as oghe Kelate beto (true Kelantanese). The Cina Kampung in Kelantan have native speaker competence in the Kelantanese dialect that makes them impossible to distinguish from Malays. Cina Kampung assimilation in Kelantan is manifested as: "Malay behaviour as frontstage and Chinese behaviour as backstage". "Frontstage" or public behaviour includes speaking Kelantanese Malay even when among themselves, adopting Malay-style clothing, and observing certain Malay customs and holidays. "Backstage" or private behaviour includes maintaining certain traditional Chinese beliefs and customs confined only within the home. A pattern which they also associate as Peranakan Chinese, nonetheless they are culturally different in some ways from the Strait-Chinese Peranakan of Malacca, Penang, Singapore and Indonesia.

Much of Chinese culture still continues until today; such as the lion dance and dragon dance during Chinese New Year, temple celebration, eating bakchang, mooncake, baby fullmoon, pulut kuning, telur merah, eat 'e' (tangyuan), religious celebration including praying to the Na Tuk Kong. They also cook 'bak hong', 'uang (meatball)' during wedding ceremonies and 'kiam mai' during funerals.

The village of Kampung Tok'kong in the Kelantan state of Malaysian is well known for a historically significant Chinese temple known as Seng Choon Kiong. 25 km from Kota Bharu, it is located within a paddy field village with a population of around 500 person. The temple is approximately 300 years old and is dedicated to the worship of the goddess Mazu. Every year on the equivalent date to 23 March on the Chinese calendar, the birthday of Mazu is commemorated with concerts, lion dance, carrying god ride 'Kheng kiu', 'siam hee' and also wayang kulit show for three days. Chinese and Mazu followers visit the temple to pay homage to Mazu, to offer prayers for health and wealth, as well as for personal safety and security and eat Kampung Tokkong most famous 'Bak hong'.

Unlike the Chinese in other parts of Malaysia, Kelantanese Chinese prefer to conduct their wedding party at home rather than at a restaurant. This reflects their mindset that their presence to celebrate the newly weds is more important than the wedding banquet. And also make it a gathering ceremony to celebrate the angsu 'red/ happiness'. The amount of guests relate to how respectable the house owner is. This is further proven by their generosity of the money gifts from the newly weds. Usually the wedding ceremony begins on Thursday night and proceeds until the next morning because the weekend holiday is Friday in Kelantan. For good luck, the groom has to bring home the bride before 12 noon on the Friday in a car decorated with flowers.

Most Chinese villagers bury their dead at the local town cemetery. Others cremate the dead at the nearest Wat. If the deceased was old, a three-day funeral ceremony and memorial is conducted, complete with chanting from the monks. But if the deceased was of the younger generation, they are either buried or cremated as soon as possible. They also offers prayers for anniversary for the death.

==== Indians ====
Indians are known to be one of the smallest ethnic groups in Kelantan. During British rule, Indians were brought in to Kelantan to work in rubber estates around Gua Musang District and Tanah Merah as labourers.

==== Orang Asli ====
Orang Asli, mostly Temiar people, are people who have lived in the forests of Kelantan and Perak for thousands of years. Some of the Temiar maintain traditional beliefs in their natural surroundings and other forms of animist elements. Other Orang Asli ethnic groups that live in Kelantan are Jahais, Bateks and Mendriqs.

=== Religion ===
Religion in Kelantan – 2020 Census
religion	percent
Islam	97%
Buddhism	2.3%
Christianity	0.1%
No religion	0.2%
Hinduism	0.1%
Others	0.2%
Chinese ethnic religion	0%
Unknown / none	0%

As of 2020 the population of Kelantan is 97% Muslim, 2.3% Buddhist, 0.1% Christian, 0.1% Hindu, 0.4% follower of other religions or non-religious.

Statistics from the 2010 Census indicate that 93.2% of the Chinese population identify as Buddhists, with significant minorities of adherents identifying as Muslims (3.0%), Christians (2.8%) and Chinese folk religions (0.6%). The latter figure may include followers of Taoism. The majority of the Indian population identify as Hindus (76.5%), with a significant minorities of numbers identifying as Muslims (11.6%), Buddhists (6.7%) and Christians (3.7%). The non-Malay bumiputera community are predominantly Muslims (39.8%), with significant minorities identifying as Atheists (30.3%) and Christians (14.3%). All Malays are considered Muslims according to Malaysian law.

== Culture ==
The culture of Kelantan has been influenced by Thai culture due to its location on the Thai border. Among the popular cultural practices are Dikir Barat, Wayang Kulit Kelantan, Wayang Kulit Melayu, Mak Yong, Menora, Main Puteri, Wau Bulan (kite-flying), Gasing (top-spinning), Silat, Tomoi, bird-singing competition and handicrafts. The unique Kelantan culture, Mak Yong is recognized by UNESCO. This ancient theatre form created by Malaysia's Malay communities combines acting, vocal and instrumental music, gestures and elaborate costumes. Specific to the villages of Kelantan in northwest Malaysia, where the tradition originated, Mak Yong is performed mainly as entertainment or for ritual purposes related to healing practices.

Among the handicraft products that are produce in Kelantan are songket, batik, silverware and mengkuang.

=== Cuisine ===
The Kelantanese cuisine is part of Malay cuisine but maintains its own unique identity. Kelantanese food makes more use of coconut milk than anywhere else in the country. Curries are richer, and creamier.

==== Local dishes ====
Specialty	Description
Nasi dagang	A mix of white rice and brown glutinous rice, cooked with coconut milk, blended onions, garlic and some spices (such as fenugreek) (halba). Fish or chicken curry is usually a complementary dish, together with a mild brown sugared sambal (chili paste).
Nasi kerabu	Nasi Kerabu literally means rice salad. Kelantan has a variety of nasi kerabu. Nasi Kerabu biasa ("normal"), putih ("white"), hitam ("black"), though the actual color is blue after the flower used as colouring in the recipe and kuning ("yellow"), for the turmeric used in the cooking process. Each kerabu is usually served with a matching, traditional sambal. The kerabu (salad) itself can be any combination of vegetables or edible leaves. It is also served with fried breaded fish, keropok keping, (see below), salted egg, solok lada (chillies stuffed with minced fish and grated coconut), and pickled garlic. Importantly, a sauce called budu must be included for the dish to qualify.
Nasi tumpang	Rice packed in a cone-shaped banana leaf. A pack of nasi tumpang consists of an omelette, meat floss, chicken and/or shrimp curry and sweet gravy. It is traditionally meant for travellers.
Ayam percik	Wood-fire broiled chicken dressed with sweet coconut gravy. Ayam golek/ayam percik is eaten with white rice in major family dishes and is served during feasts.
Nasi Berlauk	A popular breakfast food for the Kelantanese. Nasi berlauk is rice served with fish or chicken and vegetables cooked with turmeric and galangal infused yellow gravy.
Nasi ulam	Ulam is the local term for raw vegetables – the meal consists of white rice served with a variety of raw vegetables, and is one of the healthier dishes found in Malay cuisine.
Keropok	These are Kelantanese crackers and can be made from fish, prawns or squid. The way they are made is similar to keropok gote, but after they are steamed or boiled and thinly sliced and dried for storage or further cooking.
Keropok lekor	These are Kelantanese fish sausages of Terengganu origin. Made by combining fish flesh and sago or tapioca flour, keropok lekor is rolled into long firm sticks and then steamed or boiled. To enjoy it, one has to cut it into desired bite sized and deep fried. It is a popular schoolchildren's snack food.
Laksa kelantan	The Laksa dish, white noodles served with gravy (curry or otherwise) and vegetables, is made differently in every states in Malaysia. The Laksa in Kelantan is richer and has a more full-bodied flavour. The main ingredient is fish flesh. Laksam is another version, with a thicker noodle. Laksa or Laksam is served with Ulam (salad) similar to that in nasi kerabu, with a pinch of salt and belacan, a fermented shrimp paste.

==== Colek ====
Contrary to popular belief, colek is not just a dipping sauce, but can also refer to a snack eaten with the sauce. Colek comes in various forms, including meaty cholek, colek ayam (chicken), colek perut (cow tripe), colek pelepong (cow or lamb lung; usually fried plain), and also a variety of colek buah (fruits; usually unmatured, thus crunchy and sour tasting) such as colek pauh (mango).

Colek manis (with brown sugar) is a sweet, sour and very mildly hot version. This colek is different from other chili sauces because colek is very thin and rather sweet. This dipping sauce is used for chicken, and also goes well with shrimp, fish cake, spring roll, sausage, etc.

==== Budu ====
Budu is a salted (fermented) anchovy sauce eaten mainly as flavouring with rice, grilled fish and vegetables/salads (ulam). A bit of lime juice, hot chilis and shallots are added on for taste. Also, tempoyak (fermented durian) or fresh durian is added. Once combined, the purple-brownish condiment has a blend of salty and sour taste. Sometimes, budu is used in cooking as an ingredient.

Nowadays, other types of fish are also used to create budu. Famous budu making villages include Kg. Tawang, Bachok and Kg. Penambang near Kota Bharu.

Similar sauces are found in the Philippines and Indochina (Vietnam, Cambodia).

==== Somtam ====
Somtam is a thai-influenced green papaya salad with a salty, spicy, and sour taste. The main items in it are young, unripe papaya, soy sauce, groundnuts, fish sauce, lime juice, and chilies. These items are combined in a mortar, pounded with a pestle for few seconds and served. The salty and lime juicy taste is very popular. This light dish is widely available in regions with large numbers of ethnic Thais, such as Tumpat and Siamese wats.

==== Tongmo ====
Tongmo (from Cham tung lamo "cow intestines") is a spiced sausage introduced by the Cambodian Chams community concentrated in Kota Bharu.

== Tourism ==
Among the popular tourist destinations in Kelantan are:

- Siti Khadijah Market – A market mostly run by women.
- Taman Negara – Located in the Gua Musang Region, Kelantan, near the Pahang border and Terengganu. It is located in the Hantu Hill and Lebir reserve forest.
- Wat Photivihan Sleeping Buddha – This temple is one of the 25 temples found in Tumpat, and is one of the most popular in the country.
- Seng Choon Kiong (Mazu Temple) – approximately 300 years old Temple in Kampung Tok'kong and is a site of pilgrimage for worshippers of Mazu in Malaysia
- Sultan Ismail Petra Silver Jubilee Mosque – Mosque that combines Chinese and Islamic architecture and resembles a 1,000-year-old Niujie Mosque in Beijing, China.
- Irama Bachok Beach – Located within the Bachok District and is the main tourist spot of Bachok District residents and Kelantan residents in particular.
- Gunung Stong State Park – Home to one of the highest waterfalls in Malaysia, the seven-tiered Jelawang Waterfall.
- Muhammadi Mosque – One of the symbols of splendor in this city that has the hallmarks of graceful gates and golden colors. Al-Muhammadi Mosque's name is a tribute to Sultan Muhammad IV's contribution and service to the state.
- Masjid Al-Ismaili – Mosque located in Bandar Baru Pasir Pekan, Wakaf Baru.
- Pantai Bisikan Bayu (Beach of Whispering Breeze) – also known as Pantai Dalam Rhu, the wind at the beach produces a quite sound that, locals say, sounds like a soothing whisper.
- Handicraft Village and Craft Museum – Also known as "Balai Getam Guri", it has many examples of Kelantanese craftsmanship such as traditional embroidery, songket weaving, batik printing, silver work and wood carving.

== See also ==
- Kelantan Royal Mausoleum
