= Vernon =

Vernon may refer to:

== Places ==
=== Australia ===
- Vernon County, New South Wales

=== Canada ===
- Vernon, British Columbia, a city
- Vernon, Ontario

=== France ===
- Vernon, Ardèche
- Vernon, Eure

=== United States ===
- Vernon, Alabama
- Vernon, Arizona
- Vernon, California
- Lake Vernon, California
- Vernon, Colorado
- Vernon, Connecticut
- Vernon, Delaware
- Vernon, Florida, a city
- Vernon Lake (Idaho)
- Vernon, Illinois
- Vernon, Indiana
- Vernon, Kansas
- Vernon Community, Hestand, Kentucky
- Vernon Parish, Louisiana
  - Vernon Lake, a man-made lake in the parish
- Vernon, Michigan
- Vernon Township, Isabella County, Michigan
- Vernon Township, Shiawassee County, Michigan
- Vernon, Jasper County, Mississippi
- Vernon, Madison County, Mississippi
- Vernon, Winston County, Mississippi
- Vernon Township, New Jersey
- Vernon (town), New York
  - Vernon (village), New York
- Vernon (Mount Olive, North Carolina), a historic plantation house
- Vernon Township, Crawford County, Ohio
- Vernon Township, Scioto County, Ohio
- Vernon Township, Trumbull County, Ohio
- Vernon, Oklahoma
- Vernon, Portland, Oregon, a neighborhood of Portland
- Vernon, Texas
- Vernon, Utah
- Vernon, Vermont
- Vernon, West Virginia
- Vernon, Wisconsin, a village
- Vernon (community), Wisconsin, an unincorporated community
- Vernon County, Wisconsin

=== Multiple countries ===
- Mount Vernon (disambiguation)

== People and fictional characters ==
- Vernon (given name), a list of people and fictional characters with the given name
- Vernon (surname), including a list of people with the surname
- Vernon (rapper) (born 1998), South Korean and American rapper and member of Seventeen
- Di Vernon, pen name of Eliza D. Keith (1854–1939), American educator, suffragist and journalist

== Ships ==
- HMS Vernon, two ships and a training establishment of the British Royal Navy
- Vernon (1779 ship)
- Vernon (1839 ship)
- Vernon II
- Vernon III

== Other uses ==
- Vickers Vernon, a British military cargo aircraft of the interwar period
- Vernon (1839), a paddle steamer built in 1839
- Baron Vernon, a title in Great Britain
- Vernon Systems, a museum collections management software company based in New Zealand
- Vernons, a football pool company
- Vernon Automobile Corporation
- Vernon station, a light rail station in Los Angeles
- Tropical Storm Vernon, several tropical cyclones named Vernon

== See also ==
- Vernon Islands (disambiguation)
