= Vernon Islands (disambiguation) =

Vernon Islands is an island group in the Northern Territory of Australia.

Vernon Islands may also refer to.

- Vernon Islands, Northern Territory, a locality
- Vernon Islands Conservation Reserve, a protected area in the Northern Territory

== See also ==
- Vernon (disambiguation)
- Edward Venables-Vernon-Harcourt
