= Glyde Point =

- Suburb
- Interactive map of Glyde Point
- Coordinates: 12°10′50″S 131°04′44″E
- Country: Australia
- State: Northern Territory
- LGA: Litchfield Municipality
- Location: 37 km (23 mi) NE of Darwin
- Established: 4 April 2007

Government
  - Territory electorate: Nelson
  - Federal division: Lingiari

Population
  - Total: 0 (2016 census)
- Time zone: UTC+9:30 (ACST)
- Postcode: 0822
- Mean max temp: 32.1 °C (89.8 °F)
- Mean min temp: 23.2 °C (73.8 °F)
- Annual rainfall: 1,725.1 mm (67.92 in)
Suburbs around Glyde Point
Vernon Islands	Vernon Islands	Vernon Islands
Gunn Point	Glyde Point	Vernon Islands; Koolpinyah
Murrumujuk	Koolpinyah	Koolpinyah
- Locations; Adjoining localities

Glyde Point is a locality in the Northern Territory of Australia located about 37 kilometres (23 mi) north-east of the territory capital of Darwin.

Glyde Point is located on land on the south coast of the Clarence Strait which overlooks the Vernon Islands. This locality is named after the point of the same name which was named in the 1860s possibly after Lavington Glyde, a former member of the South Australian Parliament. Its boundaries and name were gazetted on 4 April 2007.

The 2016 Australian census which was conducted in August 2016 reports that Glyde Point had no people living within its boundaries.

In 2019, the Australian Broadcasting Corporation reported that consideration was being given to building a port facility within the locality at Glyde Point that could be used by the Royal Australian Navy and the US Marine Corps. This was proposed in response to the 99-year lease of Port Darwin to a company owned by a Chinese Communist Party-connected billionaire.

Glyde Point is located within the federal division of Lingiari, the territory electoral division of Nelson and within the local government area of the Litchfield Municipality.
