= List of anthems of Venezuela =

All twenty-three of states of Venezuela count with their own state anthems, which have been adopted over the course of time by the states' local governments. The anthems are considered symbols of each state alongside their flags, coats of arms and representative trees.

The country's national anthem is Gloria al Bravo Pueblo ("Glory to the Brave People"), written by Vicente Salias in 1810 and adopted in 1881.

== State anthems ==
State	Anthem	Composer	Lyricist
Amazonas	"Himno del Estado Amazonas"	Sergio Elguí	Carlos Arocha Luna
Anzoátegui	"Himno del Estado Anzoátegui"	Angel Mottola Martucci	Enrique Pérez Valencia
Apure	"¡Vuelvan Caras!"	César Ramírez Gómez	Amadeo Garbi
Aragua	"Himno del Estado Aragua"	Manuel Betancourt	Ramón Bastidas
Barinas	Himno del Estado Barinas	Pedro Elías Gutiérrez	Rafael Montenegro
Bolívar	"Himno del Estado Bolívar"	Manuel Lara Colmenares	José Manuel Agosto Méndez
Carabobo	"Himno del Estado Carabobo"	Sebastián Díaz Peña	Santiago Gonzáles Guiñán
Cojedes	"Himno del Estado Cojedes"	Miguel Ángel Granados	Mauricio Pérez Lazo
Delta Amacuro	"Himno del Estado Delta Amacuro"	José Inés Richemón	José Joaquín de León
Falcón	"Himno del Estado Falcón"	Rafael Alcorcer	Elías David Curiel
Guárico	"Himno del Estado Guárico"	Salvador Llamozas	Pedro Pablo Montenegro
Lara	"Himno del Estado Lara"	Juan Bautista Oviedo	Pedro Istúriz
Mérida	"Himno del Estado Mérida"	Antonio Febres Cordero	Gil Antonio Gil
Miranda	"Himno del Estado Miranda"	Germán Lira	Jacinto Áñez
Monagas	"Himno del Estado Monagas"	Carlos Mohle	Idelfonso Núñez
Nueva Esparta	"Himno del Estado Nueva Esparta"	Benigno Rodríguez Buzual	M. A. Mata Silva
Portuguesa	"Himno del Estado Portuguesa"	Jesús Alvarado	Fernando Eduardo Delgado
Sucre	"Himno del Estado Sucre"	Benigno Rodríguez Bruzual	Ramón David León
Táchira	"Himno del Estado Táchira"	Miguel Ángel Espinel	Ramón Vargas
Trujillo	"Himno del Estado Trujillo"	Esteban Rasquin	Antonio Pacheco
Vargas	"Carmañola Americana"	Unknown	
Yaracuy	"Himno del Estado Yaracuy"	Abdón Ramírez	Pedro María Sosa
Zulia	"Sobre Palmas"	José Antonio Chaves	Udón Pérez

== Other anthems ==
- Anthem of the Baruta Municipality

== See also ==
- List of flags of Venezuela
- Symbols of Venezuela
- List of regional anthems
