= Vernon Islands =

Island group in Northern Territory, Australia

Native name: Potinga Islands
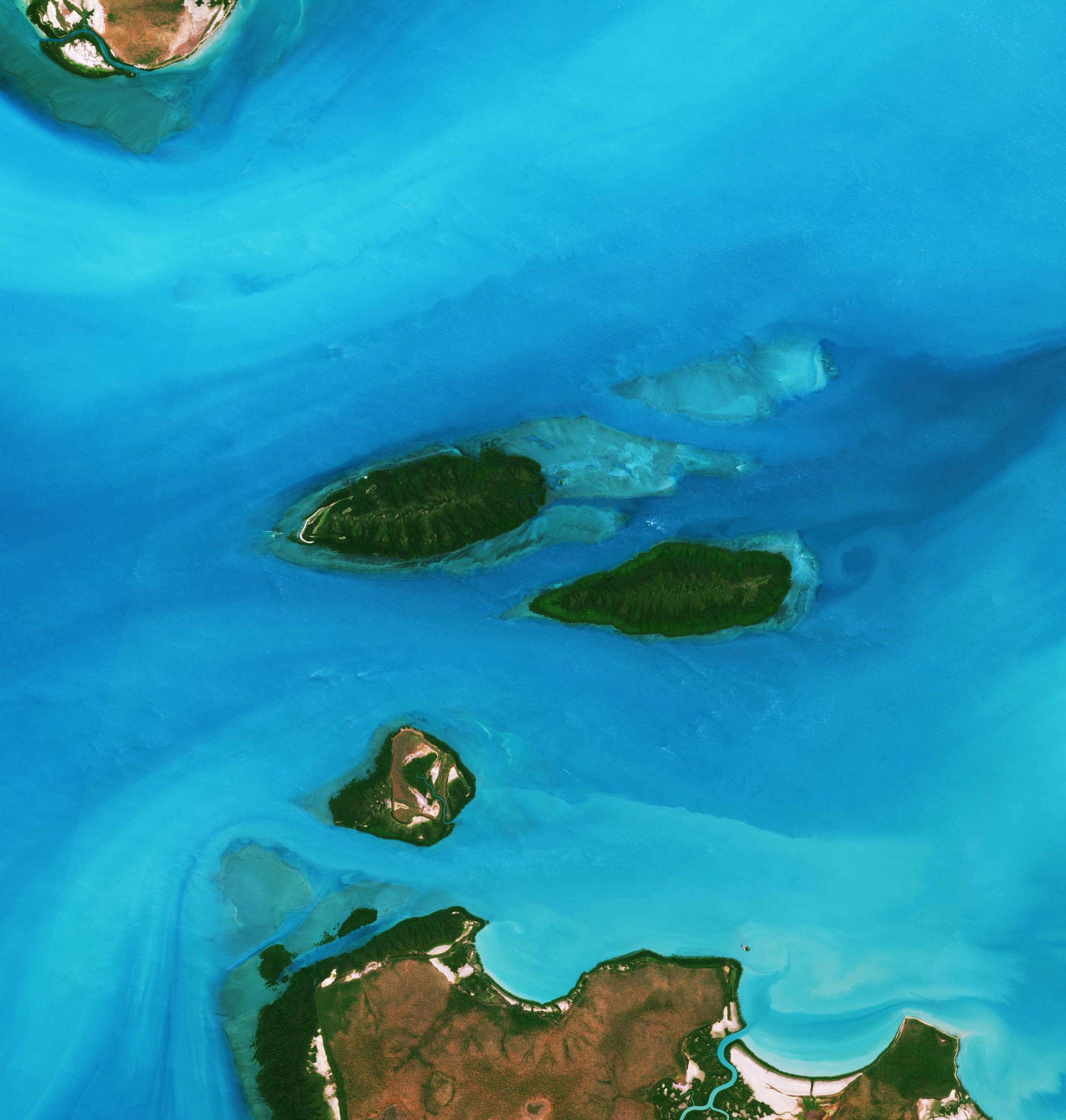
- Satellite image of the Vernon Islands, 2019

- Location within Northern Territory
- Etymology: Edward Venables-Vernon-Harcourt

Geography
- Location: Clarence Strait
- Coordinates: 12°05′00″S 131°02′00″E
- Adjacent to: Clarence Strait
- Total islands: 3
- Major islands: East Vernon Island; North West Vernon Island; South West Vernon Island
- Highest elevation: 4 m (13 ft)

Administration
- Australia
- Territory: Northern Territory
- Locality: Vernon Islands

Demographics
- Population: 0 (2016)

Vernon Islands, also known as the Potinga Islands, is an island group in the Northern Territory of Australia located in the Clarence Strait about 55 kilometres (34 mi) north-east of the territory capital of Darwin. The group consists of three islands which were first sighted by Europeans in 1818 on a British navy ship under the command of Phillip Parker King. The group were part of the subject of a successful aboriginal land claim which was resolved after 40 years in 2018 when the Tiwi people received title. All three islands host navigation aids which assist vessels passing through the Clarence Strait. It and some adjoining seabed have had protected area status since 1974 and which has been known as the Vernon Islands Conservation Reserve since 1979. Since 2007, the island group has been located in the locality of Vernon Islands.

== Description ==
The Vernon Islands are located in the Northern Territory of Australia in the southern half of the Clarence Strait about 55 kilometres (34 mi) north-east of the Northern Territory capital of Darwin. The group consists of three islands - East Vernon Island, North West Vernon Island and South West Vernon Island. The islands are composed of coral and are each surrounded by a coral reef that is fully covered at high water.

The Vernon Islands are located within the part of Clarence Strait where passage by watercraft is possible. The group is bounded by the following navigable passages – the North Channel to the north, the South Channel to south with a third passage, the Howard Channel, passing through the centre of group separating South West Vernon Island from the other two islands.

== Flora and fauna ==
=== Flora ===
East Vernon Island and North West Vernon Island are covered with mangroves while South West Vernon Island has terrestrial trees on its centre and mangroves to its coastline. The tree cover on all islands is reported as reaching heights in range of 18 to 21m Intertidal flora consists of seagrass and “algal beds.”

=== Fauna ===
The intertidal zone around the Vernon Islands is described in one source as “an important coral reef locality” and as a site for turtles and dugongs.

== History ==
=== Aboriginal use ===
The Vernon Islands are of cultural and spiritual significance to the following Australian aboriginal peoples – the Tiwi Islanders, the Larrakia and the Wulna. In particular, Tiwi Islanders believe that the Tiwi Islands and adjoining waters including the Clarence Strait were created by their ancestor, Mudunkala. Historically, Tiwi Islanders used the island group for the hunting of dugong and turtles, and as a staging post for journeys to the mainland to “capture mainland women”.

The island group was part of the subject of a land claim lodged in 1978 under the Aboriginal Land Rights (Northern Territory) Act 1976. The land claim was subsequently resolved and revised legislation was assented on 11 December 2015 with the title of the land was given to the Mantiyupwi Tiwi people on 12 March 2018.

In 2013, the Tiwi Land Council, a statutory body which acts on behalf of the Tiwi Islanders, proposed to add the patrol of the coastline of the island group and adjoining waters to its usual management agenda to monitor “weeds and/or feral animals, marine debris, unusual events such as fish kills or unseasonal algal blooms,” and “visitor numbers.”

The Tiwi Land Council allows recreational fishing in the islands’ intertidal zone, but requires those persons wishing to access any of the three islands to obtain a visitor permit.

The Tiwi islanders refer to the island group as the Potinga Islands with Kulangana being the name for Southwest Vernon Island, Warabatj being the name for Northwest Vernon Island and Muma being the name for East Vernon Island.

=== European use ===
The first reported sighting of the Vernon Islands by any European individual or group was the crew of the British vessel, HMS Mermaid commanded by Phillip Parker King. King named the islands on either 29 or 30 May 1818 probably after Edward Venables-Vernon-Harcourt, the Archbishop of York, who is sometimes known as Edward Vernon.

In the twenty first century, the waters adjoining the Vernon Islands have been described by one source as a popular site for both recreational fishing and boating activity.

== Navigation aids ==
Navigation aids have been located on parts of the following islands adjoining the Howard Channel to assist the passage of “ocean-going vessels” travelling between Beagle Gulf and Van Diemen Gulf – western end of North West Vernon Island, the north coast of South West Vernon Island and the south coast of East Vernon Island.

== Protected area status ==
The Vernon Islands and a reef to the north-east of the island group known as Knight Reef, were gazetted in 1974 as a protected area which has been known as the Vernon Islands Conservation Reserve since 1979.

== Administrative status ==
On 4 April 2007, most of the area occupied by the Clarence Strait including the Vernon Islands was gazetted by the Northern Territory Government as a locality with the name, Vernon Islands. The locality has not been added to any existing local government area and is considered to be part of the Northern Territory's unincorporated areas.
