= Carmañola Americana =

Revolutionary song

English: American Carmagnole
- State anthem of La Guaira, Venezuela
- Music: , c. 1797

The Carmañola Americana (American Carmagnole) is a revolutionary song composed circa 1797 following the model of the French Carmagnole. In context, it was composed during the independentist movement of Manuel Gual and José María España. The song incited the population to revolt against Spanish colonial rule, seeking for freedom and independence.

The song was found in a raid on the prisoners of the La Guaira prison in 1797 together with another anti-monarchist copla titled "Canción americana", forming a book that also contained a translation of Rights of Man by Thomas Paine, a speech addressed to the "Free Inhabitants of Spanish America", among other propaganda documents. The translation may have been the work of Manuel Cortés Campomanes, though there is no explicit reference to this effect. This lyric was used as evidentiary material to demonstrate the crime of lèse-majesté of the participants in the Gual and España Conspiracy, some of whom had benefited from a pardon offered in the name of Charles IV by the Real Acuerdo of the Royal Audiencia of Caracas in exchange for informing on the conspiracy's participants.

The song is the unofficial state anthem of La Guaira State.

== Lyrics ==
Chorus
Bailen los sin camisas
y viva el son,
bailen los sin camisas
y viva el son del cañón.

I
Yo que soy un sin camisa
un baile tengo que dar
y en lugar de guitarras,
cañones sonaran.

II
Si alguno quiere saber
por que estoy descamisado,
porque con los tributos
el rey me ha desnudado.

III
No hay exceso ni maldad
que el rey no haya ejecutado
no hay fuero, no hay derecho
que no haya violado.

IV
Todos los reyes del mundo
son igualmente tiranos
y uno de los mayores
es ese infame Carlos.

V
Todos ellos a porfía
nos tiranizan furiosos,
son crueles, son avaros,
son soberbios y orgullosos.

VI
Pero no tardaran mucho
en recibir su castigo,
porque ya los sin camisas
afilan sus cuchillos.

VII
Los sanculotes en Francia
al mundo hicieron temblar,
mas los descamisados
no se quedaran atrás.

VIII
De la ira americana
ya podéis temblar, tiranos,
que con los sin camisas
vuestra hora ha llegado.

(Chorus) (Instrumental)

IX
Cuando por la libertad
algún pueblo ha peleado,
no hay ejemplo ninguno
de haber sido humillado.

X
Dios protege nuestra causa,
Él dirige nuestro brazo
que el rey con sus delitos
su justicia ha irritado.

XI
Florecerán nuestras artes,
comercio y agricultura
y viviremos todos
en la paz más segura.

XII
La fraternidad a todos
con sus frutos ligara
y el fruto de su industria
cada uno lograra.

== See also ==
- List of anthems of Venezuela
