= Apozomus gunn =

Scientific classification
- Kingdom: Animalia
- Phylum: Arthropoda
- Subphylum: Chelicerata
- Class: Arachnida
- Order: Schizomida
- Family: Hubbardiidae
- Genus: Apozomus
- Species: A. gunn

Binomial name
- Apozomus gunn Harvey, 1992

Species of short-tailed whip-scorpion

Apozomus gunn is a species of short-tailed whip-scorpions, also known as schizomids, in the Hubbardiidae family. It is endemic to Australia. It was described in 1992 by Australian arachnologist Mark Harvey. The specific epithet gunn refers to the type locality.

== Distribution and habitat ==
The species occurs in the Top End of the Northern Territory. The type locality is Gunn Point, near Darwin. The schizomids were found in open forest plant litter.

== Behaviour ==
The short-tailed whip-scorpions are terrestrial predators.
