= Murrumujuk =

Murrumujuk Darwin, Northern Territory
- Coordinates: 12°16′10.73″S 131°03′49.69″E
- Population: 0 (2016 census)
- LGA(s): Litchfield Municipality
Suburbs around Murrumujuk:
Beagle Gulf	Gunn Point	Glyde Point
Beagle Gulf; Shoal Bay	Murrumujuk	Koolpinyah
Shoal Bay	Shoal Bay	Koolpinyah
- Footnotes: Adjoining suburbs

Murrumujuk is an outer rural locality of Darwin. It is on the coast of Shoal Bay, south of Gunn Point. The area has been provisionally set aside for a residential subdivision. Murrumujuk is of aboriginal origin.
