= Vernon Islands, Northern Territory =

Vernon Islands Northern Territory
- Coordinates: 12°03′59″S 131°05′46″E
- Population: 0 (2016 census) (Note: The extent of the “state suburb” used by the Australian Bureau of Statistics only covers integral parts of the Vernon Islands group, i.e. the three islands and the reef to the immediate north-east, and not the full extent of the locality gazetted by the Northern Territory Government.)
- Established: 4 April 2007
- Postcode(s): 0822
- Elevation: 4 m (13 ft)
- Time zone: ACST (UTC+9:30)
- Location: 55 km (34 mi) NE of Darwin City
- LGA(s): Unincorporated area
- Territory electorate(s): Nelson
- Federal division(s): Lingiari
Mean max temp	Mean min temp	Annual rainfall
32.1 °C; 90 °F	23.2 °C; 74 °F	1,725.1 mm 67.9 in
Suburbs around Vernon Islands:
Beagle Gulf	Tiwi Islands; Van Diemen Gulf	Van Diemen Gulf
Beagle Gulf	Vernon Islands	Hotham
Beagle Gulf	Beagle Gulf; Gunn Point; Glyde Point; Koolpinyah	Koolpinyah
- Footnotes: Locations; Adjoining localities

Vernon Islands is a locality in the Northern Territory of Australia located over land and water in the Clarence Strait including the Vernon Islands and which is located about 55 kilometres (34 mi) north-east of the territory capital of Darwin.

The locality is bounded as follows:

1. The southern boundary and part of the eastern boundary is formed by the coastline of the mainland from Gunn Point in the west to Cape Hotham in the east,
2. The eastern boundary across the strait is a line from Cape Hotham running towards Muranapi Point on Melville Island,
3. The northern boundary is a contour located 3 nautical miles (5.6 km; 3.5 mi) south of the coastline of Melville Island and (Note: The three nautical mile contour is both the boundary of the locality of Tiwi Islands as gazetted in 2007 and the boundary of the Tiwi Land Council as gazetted in 1978.)
4. The western boundary is a line from Red Cliffe on Melville Island that runs towards Lee Point on the mainland and which intersects with a line running west from Gunn Point thereby enclosing a portion of the waters of the Beagle Gulf.

The locality’s name is derived from the Vernon Islands, the island group which is located within the boundary of the locality and which is the only land within the locality. The official source advises that the island group was named in 1818 by Royal Navy officer, Phillip Parker King, after most probably Edward Venables-Vernon-Harcourt who was the Archbishop of York at the time. Its boundaries and name were gazetted on 4 April 2007.

Human activity within the locality involves the passage of coastal shipping between Beagle Gulf and Van Diemen Gulf, recreational fishing and diving and cultural activities carried out by the Tiwi, Larrakia and Wulna peoples. The Vernon Islands and Knight Reef, a reef to the north-east of the island group, have been gazetted as a protected area since 1974 and which has been known as the Vernon Islands Conservation Reserve since 1979.

The locality includes Henry Ellis Reef which lies within the triangle formed by the southern extremity of East Vernon Island, western extremity of North West Vernon Island and the north-east extremity of South West Vernon Island. It was named for the barque Henry Ellis, Captain Thomas Phillips, which ran aground there in June 1864.

The 2016 Australian census which was conducted in August 2016 reports that Vernon Islands had no people living within its boundaries.

Vernon Islands is located within the federal division of Lingiari, the territory electoral division of Nelson and the unincorporated areas of the Northern Territory.
