= Nueva Esparta State Anthem =

Himno del Estado Nueva Esparta
English: Nueva Esparta State Anthem
- State anthem of Nueva Esparta, Venezuela
- Lyrics: Miguel Ángel Mata Silva
- Music: Benigno Rodríguez Bruzual

The anthem for the Nueva Esparta State, Venezuela (Spanish: Himno del Estado Nueva Esparta), was written by Miguel Ángel Mata Silva; and composed by Benigno Rodríguez Bruzual.

== Lyrics in Spanish ==
Chorus
Gloria a Margarita, ¡la perla de oriente!
Gloria a Nueva Esparta, ¡Patria del valor!
que nunca se apague su estrella fulgente,
su estrella de gloria, libertad y amor.

Verse One
Coronas de nubes de la Matasiete,
cinturón de espumas el Caribe Mar,
y es el heroísmo su escudo y ariete,
su rito el trabajo, la gloria su altar.
En la magna lucha levanta primero
cual iris sagrado, nuestro pabellón;
y nunca lo rinde su brazo guerrero,
pues ella es el faro de la insurrección.

Verse Two
Su ilustre espartano, la fama pregona,
la historia la ciñe de lauro inmortal.
Sus hijos son héroes de Marte y Belona,
sus héroes son hijos de Homero y Mistral.
Siete estrellas blancas, sagradas y bellas
la patria coronan bordando su azul
Margarita es una de las siete estrellas
y llena de rayos el cerúleo tul.

Verse Three
Le dieron renombre de heroica y divina,
renombre que esplende cual nimbo en su sien
con Luisa la mártir, la egregia heroína
Arismendi, Gómez, Mariño y también
Maneiro, Figueroa, Lares y Fermín
y Díaz, Aguirre, Solva (Cayetano)
y al par de mil héroes del Campo Antolín.

Verse Four
Unidos sus hijos en santa armonía
por ley de existencia, por noble deber
el yugo arrojemos de la tiranía,
cada vez que el yugo nos quiera imponer
y siempre guardemos con nuestra bravura
la sagrada herencia de la Libertad,
y siempre nos una por nuestra ventura
con lazos de flores la fraternidad.

== Lyrics translated into English ==
Chorus
Glory to Margarita, the pearl of the East!
Glory to New Esparta, land of courage!
May her bright star never fade,
her star of glory, freedom, and love.

Verse One
Crowns of clouds from the Matasiete,
belt of foam the Caribbean Sea,
and heroism is her shield and battering ram,
her ritual is work, glory her altar.
In the great battle, she rises first
Such a sacred rainbow, our pavilion;
and will never surrender her warrior arm,
because she is the guiding light of the insurrection.

Verse Two
Her illustrious spartan, the fame announces,
history clads her with immortal praise.
Her children are heroes of Mars and Bellona,
her heroes are children of Homer and Mistral.
Seven white stars, sacred and beautiful
the country they crown embroidering her blue
Margarita is one of the seven stars
and full of rays is her azure tulle.

Verse Three
They gave her heroic and divine reputation,
reputation that shines like a halo in her temple
with Luisa the martyr, the famous heroine
Arismendi, Gómez, Mariño and also
Maneiro, Figueroa, Lares and Fermín
and Díaz, Aguirre, Solva (Cayetano)
and together with one thousand heroes of Campo Antolín.

Verse Four
Her children united in holy harmony
by law of existence, by noble duty
we shall throw off the yoke of tyranny,
every time they try to impose it on us
and shall we always guard with our courage
the sacred heirloom of liberty,
and bind us always by our fate
with bonds of flowers and brotherhood.

== See also ==
- List of anthems of Venezuela
