= Apozomus alligator =

Scientific classification
- Kingdom: Animalia
- Phylum: Arthropoda
- Subphylum: Chelicerata
- Class: Arachnida
- Order: Schizomida
- Family: Hubbardiidae
- Genus: Apozomus
- Species: A. alligator

Binomial name
- Apozomus alligator Harvey, 1992

Species of short-tailed whip-scorpion

Apozomus alligator is a species of short-tailed whip-scorpions, also known as schizomids, in the Hubbardiidae family. It is endemic to Australia. It was described in 1992 by Australian arachnologist Mark Harvey. The specific epithet alligator refers to the type locality.

== Distribution and habitat ==
The species occurs in the Top End of the Northern Territory. The type locality is the South Alligator Inn. The schizomids were found in open forest plant litter.

== Behaviour ==
The short-tailed whip-scorpions are terrestrial predators.
