= Apozomus termitarium =

Scientific classification
- Kingdom: Animalia
- Phylum: Arthropoda
- Subphylum: Chelicerata
- Class: Arachnida
- Order: Schizomida
- Family: Hubbardiidae
- Genus: Apozomus
- Species: A. termitarium

Binomial name
- Apozomus termitarium Cokendolpher, Sissom and Reddell, 2010

Species of whipscorpion

Apozomus termitarium is a species of short-tailed whipscorpions of the genus Apozomus that belong to the family Hubbardiidae of arachnids.
