= Apozomus volschenki =

Scientific classification
- Kingdom: Animalia
- Phylum: Arthropoda
- Subphylum: Chelicerata
- Class: Arachnida
- Order: Schizomida
- Family: Hubbardiidae
- Genus: Apozomus
- Species: A. volschenki

Binomial name
- Apozomus volschenki Harvey, 2001

Species of short-tailed whip-scorpion

Apozomus volschenki is a species of short-tailed whip-scorpions, also known as schizomids, in the Hubbardiidae family. It is endemic to Australia. It was described in 2001 by Australian arachnologist Mark Harvey. The specific epithet volschenki honours Erich Volschenk, collector of type specimens.

== Description ==
The body length of the female holotype is 4.4 mm. The colour is yellowish-brown.

== Distribution and habitat ==
The species occurs in Far North Queensland. The type locality is Surprise Packet Cave, Chillagoe.

== Behaviour ==
The short-tailed whip-scorpions are cave-dwelling, terrestrial predators.
