= Anthem of the Baruta Municipality =

- anthem of Baruta Municipality, Venezuela
- Lyrics: Ernesto Luis Rodríguez
- Music: Inocente Carreño
- Adopted: June 7, 1994

The Anthem of the Baruta Municipality is the official anthem of Baruta Municipality in Venezuela. It has music by Inocente Carreño and lyrics by Ernesto Luis Rodríguez. It was adopted on June 7, 1994.

== See also ==
- Baruta Municipality
- Seal of Baruta Municipality
- Flag of Baruta Municipality, Miranda

== Sources ==
- Baruta Municipality website
