= Bolívar State Anthem =

- State anthem of Bolívar, Venezuela
- Lyrics: José Manuel Agosto Méndez
- Music: Manuel Lara Colmenares
- Adopted: January 22, 1910

The anthem of the Bolívar State, Venezuela, has lyrics written by José Manuel Agosto Méndez; the music for it was composed by Manuel Lara Colmenares. It was established as the anthem of the State by National Decree on 22 January 1910.

== Lyrics in Spanish Language ==
Chorus

Con áureos buriles tus magnas proezas
la historia en sus faustos por siempre grabó;
tu suelo es emporio de ingentes riquezas,
¡tu cielo, el más bello que el sol alumbró!

I
Gentil amazona de faz sonriente,
gallarda te muestras sobre alto peñón;
¡el lauro circunda tu olímpica frente
y el viento tremola tu airoso pendón!

II
Al trágico encuentro de hirsutos leones,
tus águilas fueron en marcha triunfal;
¡y el sol de San Félix brilló en tus blasones!,
¡y fue desde entonces tu nombre inmortal!

III
Tu encierras, ¡oh Patria! lo bello y lo grande.
La gloria te ilustra, te ampara el honor.
Y el bravo Orinoco tus pecho expande
Cantando su eterno poema de amor.

IV
¡Guayana! Santuario de músicas lleno,
que brindas al alma contento y solaz,
permitan los hados que siempre en tu seno
sus rosas y mirtos deshoje la paz.

== Lyrics in English Language ==
Chorus

With aureous burins your great exploits
the history in its pomps engraved forever;
your soil is center of enormous riches,
your sky, the most beautiful that the sun has illuminated!

I
Gentle amazona with a smiling face,
valiant you show yourself over a high rock;
the laurels encircle your olympic forehead
and the wind hoists your graceful pennant!

II
To the tragic encounter of hirsute lions,
your eagles went in a triumphal march;
and the sun at San Félix shone in your escutcheons!,
and your name was inmortal henceforth!

III
You enclose, oh Homeland! the beautiful and the great.
The glory makes you famous, the honor shelters you.
And the ferocious Orinoco your chest expands
Singing your eternal love poem.

IV
Guayana! Sanctuary full of music
that you offer to the content and relaxed soul,
may fate allow that forever in your bosom
Peace scatters the leaves from its roses and myrtles.

== See also ==
- List of anthems of Venezuela
