= Hector (cloud) =

Regularly recurring thundercloud

Coordinates: 12.4°S 128.9°E

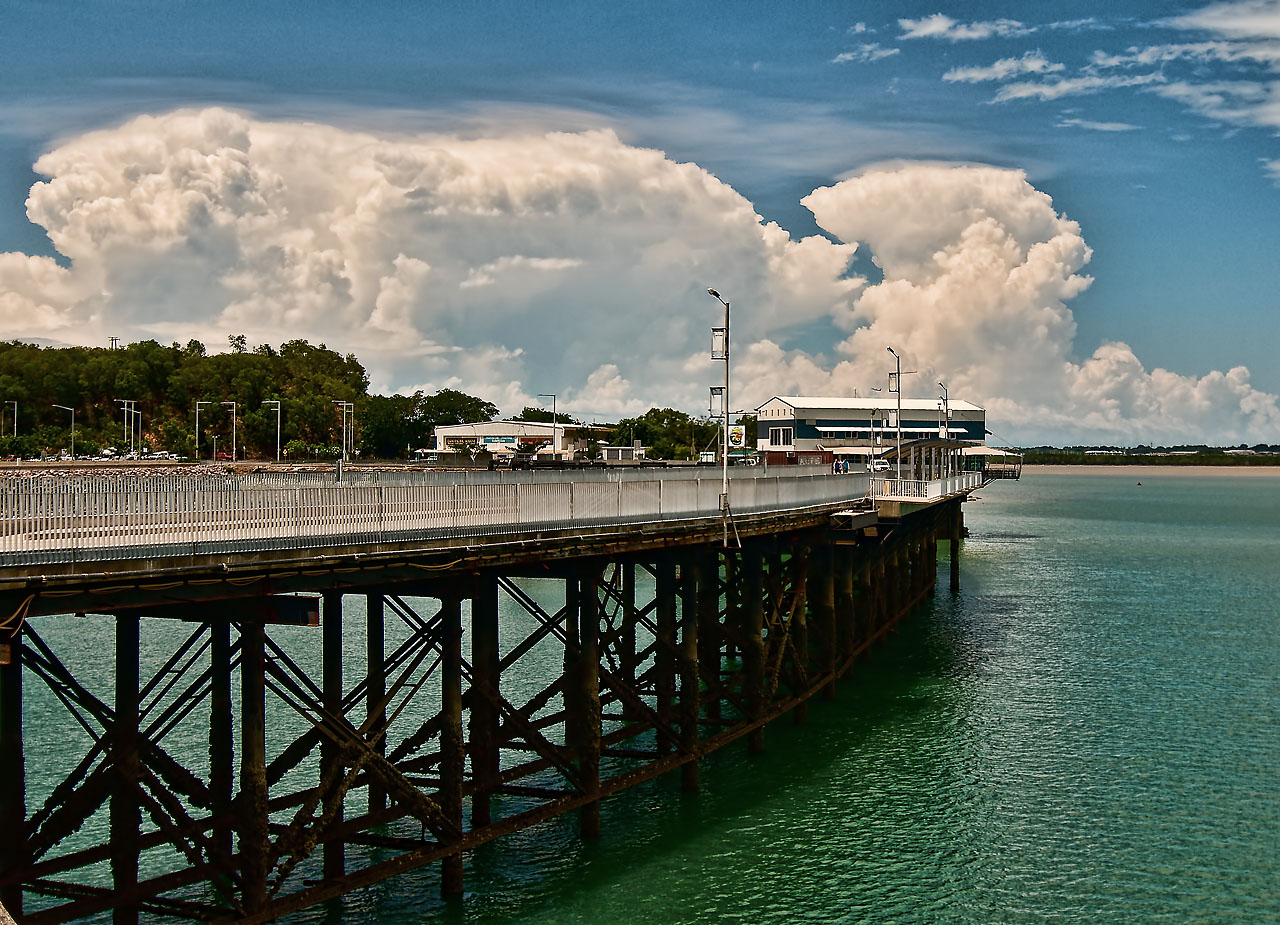
Hector viewed from Stokes Hill Wharf in Darwin looking northwest at a distance of approximately 80 km (50 mi)

Hector is a cumulonimbus thundercloud cluster that forms regularly nearly every afternoon on the Tiwi Islands in the Northern Territory of Australia, from approximately September to March each year. Hector, or sometimes Hector the Convector, is known as one of the world's most consistently large thunderstorms; specifically, a small mesoscale convective system (MCS) or large multicellular thunderstorm. It reaches heights of approximately 20 kilometres (66,000 ft).

== History ==
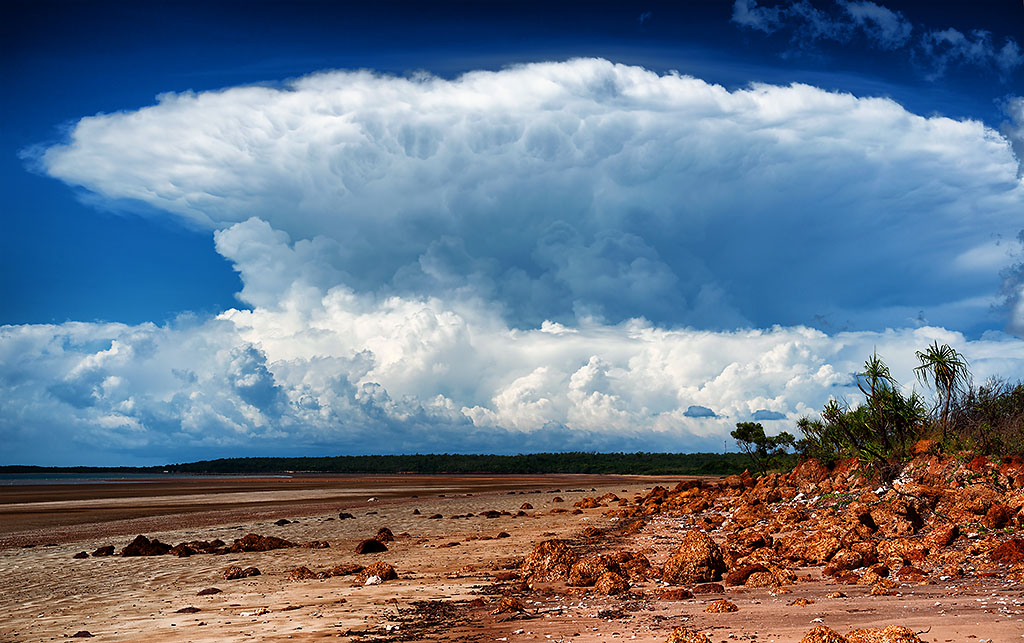
Hector from Gunn Point, Northern Territory

Named by pilots during the Second World War, the recurring position of the thunderstorm made it a navigational beacon for pilots and mariners in the region. A mesoscale phenomenon, Hector is caused primarily by a collision of several sea breeze boundaries across the Tiwi Islands and is known for its consistency and intensity. Lightning flash rates and updraft speeds are notable aspects of this thunderstorm and during the 1990s National Geographic magazine published a comprehensive study of the storm with pictures of damaged trees and details of updraft speeds and references to tornadic events. The consistency of the phenomenon is caused by frequently occurring atmospheric conditions due to the sea and due to topography, and the underlying atmospheric environment constitutes a distinct microclimate (which are common with islands, especially ones exhibiting significant topographic relief).

Since the late 1980s the thunderstorm complex has been the subject of many meteorological studies, many centred on Hector itself, but also utilising the consistency of the storm cell to study other aspects of thunderstorms, lightning, atmospheric boundaries, and marine and terrain effects on the atmosphere.

== See also ==
- List of cloud types
- Morning Glory cloud
- Catatumbo lightning
