= Zulia State Anthem =

English: Riding the Waves
- State anthem of Zulia, Venezuela
- Lyrics: Udón Perez
- Music: José Antonio Cháves
- Adopted: August 15, 1909

Audio sample
- file; help

The anthem of Zulia State, "Over Palm Trees", became official by Executive Order of August 15, 1909. It was the result of a public competition sponsored by the then Governor of the State, Jose Ignacio Lares Baralt, who on April 29 of that year, held a lyric and musical contest to select the words and melody of such treasured lyrical piece. The winner of the lyrical category was the famed poet laureate, Udón Perez; in the musical category, the winner was the equally renowned author, Jose Antonio Cháves. The winning entries were officially recognized on the above date, during a ceremony headed by the illustrious governor, but it was not until February 18, 1910 that the anthem was finally distributed throughout the various departments and offices of the State. With its beautiful melody, and a theme built around the ideas of freedom, peace, and hope, the anthem has remained a favorite of the people. It still speaks a revolutionary language - highly critical of dictatorship - and continues to communicate the State’s age-old abhorrence of centralist powers.

== Lyrics in Spanish ==
Chorus
Sobre palmas y lauros de oro
yergue el Zulia su limpio blasón;
y flamea en su plaustro sonoros
del progreso el radiante pendón.

I
La luz con el relámpago
tenaz del Catatumbo,
del nauta fija el rumbo,
cual límpido farol;
el alba de los trópicos,
la hoguera que deslumbra
cuando al zénit se encumbra
la cuadriga del sol
no emulan de tus glorias
el fúlgido arrebol

II
En la defensa olímpica
de los nativos fueros
tus hijos, sus aceros
llevaron al confín;
ciñendo lauros múltiples
los viste, con arrobo,
del Lago a Carabobo,
del Ávila a Junín;
y en Tarqui y Ayacucho
vibraron su clarín.

III
Erguido como Júpiter,
la diestra en alto armada,
fulgurante la mirada
de rabia y de rencor;
las veces que los sátrapas
quisieron tu mancilla:
mirarte de rodilla
sin prez y sin honor
cayó sobre sus frentes
tu rayo vengador.

IV
Y luego que la cólera
de tu justicia calmas,
va en pos de nuevas palmas
tu espíritu vivaz;
en aulas de areópagos,
cabildos y liceos;
te brindan sus trofeos
el numen de la paz;
y vese en blanca aureola
resplandecer tu faz.

V
En tu carroza alígera
que tiran diez corceles,
de cantos y laureles
guirnaldas mil se ven.
Allí del arte el símbolo
del sabio la corona,
de Temis y Pomona
la espada y el lairén.
La enseña del trabajo
y el lábaro del bien.

VI
Jamás, jamás, los déspotas
o la invasión taimada,
la oliva por la espada
te obliguen a trocar;
y sigas a la cúspide;
triunfante como eres,
rumores de talleres
oyendo sin cesar
en vez de los clarines
y el parche militar.

== See also ==
- List of anthems of Venezuela
