= Apozomus zhensis =

Scientific classification
- Domain: Eukaryota
- Kingdom: Animalia
- Phylum: Arthropoda
- Subphylum: Chelicerata
- Class: Arachnida
- Order: Schizomida
- Family: Hubbardiidae
- Genus: Apozomus
- Species: A. zhensis

Binomial name
- Apozomus zhensis Chen and Song, 1996

Species of whipscorpion

Apozomus zhensis is a species of short-tailed whipscorpions of the genus Apozomus that belong to the family Hubbardiidae of arachnids.
