= Apozomus rupina =

Scientific classification
- Kingdom: Animalia
- Phylum: Arthropoda
- Subphylum: Chelicerata
- Class: Arachnida
- Order: Schizomida
- Family: Hubbardiidae
- Genus: Apozomus
- Species: A. rupina

Binomial name
- Apozomus rupina Harvey, 1992

Species of short-tailed whip-scorpion

Apozomus rupina is a species of short-tailed whip-scorpions, also known as schizomids, in the Hubbardiidae family. It is endemic to Australia. It was described in 1992 by Australian arachnologist Mark Harvey.

== Distribution and habitat ==
The species occurs in the Northern Territory. The type locality is Butterfly Gorge in Nitmiluk National Park (Katherine Gorge). The schizomids were found in open forest plant litter.

== Behaviour ==
The short-tailed whip-scorpions are terrestrial predators.
