= Apozomus pellew =

Scientific classification
- Kingdom: Animalia
- Phylum: Arthropoda
- Subphylum: Chelicerata
- Class: Arachnida
- Order: Schizomida
- Family: Hubbardiidae
- Genus: Apozomus
- Species: A. pellew

Binomial name
- Apozomus pellew Harvey, 1992

Species of short-tailed whip-scorpion

Apozomus pellew is a species of short-tailed whip-scorpions, also known as schizomids, in the Hubbardiidae family. It is endemic to Australia. It was described in 1992 by Australian arachnologist Mark Harvey. The specific epithet pellew refers to the type locality.

== Distribution and habitat ==
The species occurs in the Northern Territory. The type locality is Horn Islet in the Sir Edward Pellew Group of Islands, in the south-west corner of the Gulf of Carpentaria. The schizomids were found in open forest plant litter.

== Behaviour ==
The short-tailed whip-scorpions are terrestrial predators.
