= Trujillo State Anthem =

- State anthem of Trujillo, Venezuela
- Lyrics: Antonio Pacheco
- Music: Esteban Rasquin

The anthem of the Trujillo State, Venezuela, was written by Antonio Pacheco; the music was composed by Esteban Rasquin.

== Lyrics in Spanish Language ==
Chorus
¡De Trujillo es tan alta la gloria!
¡De Trujillo es tan alto el honor!
¡Niquitao es el valor en la historia
y Santa Ana en la historia es amor!

I
¡Oh Trujillo! El perdón de la patria
que las armas los libre llamó:
como un ángel radiante en justicia
en tus campos ilustres brilló.

II
En tus campos es de Dios el trabajo,
en tus pompas es libre el corcel,
en tus pueblos palpita la vida,
y en tus valles se cuaja la miel.

III
Con Bolívar y Sucre, los genios
de la procera lucha inmortal
Cruz Carrillo llevó esa Bandera
a remotas regiones triunfales.

== See also ==
- List of anthems of Venezuela
