= Amazonas State Anthem =

Himno del Estado Amazonas
English: Amazonas State Anthem
- State anthem of Amazonas, Venezuela
- Music: Hernán Gruber Odremán

Audio sample
- file; help

The Amazonas State Anthem was written and composed by Hernán Gruber Odremán.

== Lyrics ==
=== Spanish original ===
Coro:
Amazonas, tu tierra engalana
las espumas del bravo raudal,
en tu selva se yergue el autana
atalaya de todo tu lar.

Para honrar la memoria sagrada
del glorioso y noble Mariscal
de Ayacucho, su gesta preciada
tomó el nombre de tu gran capital.

Coro

En tu Sierra Parima imponente
nace el río Orinoco, que Dios
en sus aguas sonoras, corrientes,
a tu pueblo alimento ofrendó.

Coro

Un emporio bendito es tu suelo,
del aborigen refugio y hogar;
de la patria ellos son lo primero
y su origen honra nacional.

Coro

Tu gran pueblo marcha al porvenir
con coraje y nobleza ideal,
y en tu cielo veremos lucir
Amazonas, tu prez sin igual.

Coro

=== English translation ===
Chorus:
Amazonas, adorned is thy land
by the mighty rapids' foam.
within thy jungle riseth Autana –
the sentinel watching o'er thy whole hearth.

To honor the sacred memory
of the glorious and noble Marshal
of Ayacucho, his cherished feats
took the name of thy great capital.

Chorus

In thine imposing Parima Mountains
the Orinoco River is born,
whose sonorous, flowing waters
were given by God to thy people.

Chorus

Thy soil's a blessed emporium –
a refuge and home for the indigenous;
they're the first children of the homeland,
and their origin's a national honor.

Chorus

Thy great people march toward the future
with ideal courage and nobility,
and in thy skies we shall see
the peerless glory of Amazonas shine.

Chorus

== See also ==
- List of anthems of Venezuela
