= Apozomus yamasakii =

Scientific classification
- Domain: Eukaryota
- Kingdom: Animalia
- Phylum: Arthropoda
- Subphylum: Chelicerata
- Class: Arachnida
- Order: Schizomida
- Family: Hubbardiidae
- Genus: Apozomus
- Species: A. yamasakii

Binomial name
- Apozomus yamasakii Cokendolpher, 1988

Species of whipscorpion

Apozomus yamasakii is a species of short-tailed whipscorpions of the genus Apozomus that belong to the family Hubbardiidae of arachnids.
