= Apozomus =

Scientific classification
- Domain: Eukaryota
- Kingdom: Animalia
- Phylum: Arthropoda
- Subphylum: Chelicerata
- Class: Arachnida
- Order: Schizomida
- Family: Hubbardiidae
- Genus: Apozomus; Harvey, 1992

Type species
- Apozomus watsoni Harvey, 1992

Species
- 19, see text

Genus of shorttailed whipscorpions

Apozomus is a genus of hubbardiid short-tailed whipscorpions, first described by Mark Harvey in 1992.

== Species ==
As of June 2022, the World Schizomida Catalog accepted the following nineteen species:

- Apozomus alligator Harvey, 1992 – Australia
- Apozomus brignolii Cokendolpher & Reddell, 2000 – Marshall Islands
- Apozomus buxtoni (Gravely, 1915) – Sri Lanka
- Apozomus cactus Harvey, 1992 – Australia
- Apozomus daitoensis (Shimojana, 1981) – Japan
- Apozomus eberhardi Harvey, 2001 – Australia
- Apozomus gerlachi Harvey, 2001 – Seychelles
- Apozomus gunn Harvey, 1992 – Australia
- Apozomus howarthi Harvey, 2001 – Australia
- Apozomus pellew Harvey, 1992 – Australia
- Apozomus rupina Harvey, 1992 – Australia
- Apozomus sauteri (Kraepelin, 1911) – China, Japan, Taiwan, Vietnam
- Apozomus termitarium Cokendolpher, Sissom & Reddell, 2010 – Malaysia
- Apozomus volschenki Harvey, 2001 – Australia
- Apozomus watsoni Harvey, 1992 – Australia
- Apozomus weiri Harvey, 1992 – Australia
- Apozomus yamasakii (Cokendolpher, 1988) – Taiwan
- Apozomus yirrkala Harvey, 1992 – Australia
- Apozomus zhensis (Chen & Song, 1996) – China
