= Monagas State Anthem =

Anthem of Monagas State, Venezuela

- State anthem of Monagas, Venezuela
- Lyrics: Idelfonso Núñez
- Music: Carlos Mohle

The anthem for the Monagas State, Venezuela, was written by Idelfonso Núñez; it has music by Carlos Mohle.

== Lyrics ==
Himno del Estado Monagas (Himno Patriótico a Maturín)	State Anthem of Monagas (Patriotic Hymn to Maturin)
Coro: Por la patria haya toques de diana; por la patria resuene el clarín; Y conserve la paz siempre ufana de su historia la fiel Maturín. Estrofa #1: Maturín, tus llanuras y vegas, altas cumbres y bosques umbríos, tus hermosas palmeras y ríos, son de dicha tu gran porvenir. Ignorada del mundo, tú eres, lo que expresa orgulloso tu escudo: "haz de bienes y gloria que pudo tu derecho a ser libre reunir". Estrofa #2: De Monagas el nombre que llevas Maturín, otros mil enaltece: fue tu hijo preclaro y merece que Ribas, Bermúdez y Piar. Entre todos resaltan aquellos que con Sanz, Paz Castillo y Zaraza, por el timbre debido a tu raza, fueron héroes de ella a la par. Estrofa #3: Cinco acciones campales libraron: tres de gloria, las otras de duelo; y en todas le cupo a tu suelo el renombre, la fama, el honor. Jamás quiso rendirse tu plaza al feroz español, al canario, ni al de América, vil mercenario que, sirviéndole al rey, fue traidor. Estrofa #4: De tus propias cenizas alzada, como el fénix tornaste a la vida: y ya puedes del lampo atraído, a más altos destinos volar. Alas tienes: las armas guerreras vuelve un hacha, un arado, una sierra, y veras que tus hijos la tierra pan les brinda, ventura y hogar.	Ref: There are touches of diana for the Homeland; For the Homeland resonates the clarion; And always keep this peace proud Of its history, the Faithful of Maturin. Stanza #1: Maturin, your Plains and Alluvial plains, High summits and dark forests, Your beautiful palm trees and rivers, Such are grace of your great future. You are ignored in the world, What your shield it expresses with proud: "Make wealth and honor what would Your Right to be free for a gather". Stanza #2: You carry the name of Monagas, Maturin, thousand people exalts you: It was your illustrious and honorable sons Like Ribas, Bermudez and Piar. Among those that stand out As Sanz, Paz Castillo and Zaraza, By the bell, because of your race, They were heroes for her at par. Stanza #3: They fought five actions of battles: Three of glory and the others of mourning; And all came to your land The renown, fame and honor. They never wanted to surrender in the places, To the Spanish Fierce, the Canary, Neither to America, vile mercenary And he, that serving the king, was a traitor. Stanza #4:33 You made the life like the phoenix Who revives from its own ashes, And you can fly to destinies very higher As the attracted lightning. You have wings: the warrior weapons Becomes an ax, a plow, a saw, And you will see your children of Earth, Will give you the bread, fortune and home.

== See also ==
- List of anthems of Venezuela
