= Apozomus howarthi =

Scientific classification
- Kingdom: Animalia
- Phylum: Arthropoda
- Subphylum: Chelicerata
- Class: Arachnida
- Order: Schizomida
- Family: Hubbardiidae
- Genus: Apozomus
- Species: A. howarthi

Binomial name
- Apozomus howarthi Harvey, 2001

Species of short-tailed whip-scorpion

Apozomus howarthi is a species of short-tailed whip-scorpions, also known as schizomids, in the Hubbardiidae family. It is endemic to Australia. It was described in 2001 by Australian arachnologist Mark Harvey. The specific epithet howarthi honours Frank Howarth, Chillagoe cave system researcher and collector of type specimens.

== Description ==
The body length of the male holotype is 3.8 mm; that of a female paratype 4.00 mm. The colour of adults is dark yellowish-brown.

== Distribution and habitat ==
The species occurs in Far North Queensland. The type locality is Tea Tree Cave, Chillagoe.

== Behaviour ==
The short-tailed whip-scorpions are cave-dwelling, terrestrial predators.
