= Apozomus gerlachi =

Conservation status
- Endangered (IUCN 3.1)

Scientific classification
- Domain: Eukaryota
- Kingdom: Animalia
- Phylum: Arthropoda
- Subphylum: Chelicerata
- Class: Arachnida
- Order: Schizomida
- Family: Hubbardiidae
- Genus: Apozomus
- Species: A. gerlachi

Binomial name
- Apozomus gerlachi Harvey, 2001

Species of whip scorpion

Apozomus gerlachi is a species of hubbardiid short-tailed whipscorpion that is endemic to Silhouette and North Islands in the Seychelles. It is threatened by habitat degradation due to invasive plants (especially Cinnamomum verum) and sea level rise.
