= Apozomus eberhardi =

Scientific classification
- Kingdom: Animalia
- Phylum: Arthropoda
- Subphylum: Chelicerata
- Class: Arachnida
- Order: Schizomida
- Family: Hubbardiidae
- Genus: Apozomus
- Species: A. eberhardi

Binomial name
- Apozomus eberhardi Harvey, 2001

Species of short-tailed whip-scorpion

Apozomus eberhardi is a species of short-tailed whip-scorpions, also known as schizomids, in the Hubbardiidae family. It is endemic to Australia. It was described in 2001 by Australian arachnologist Mark Harvey. The specific epithet eberhardi honours Stefan Eberhard, who collected the sole specimen.

== Description ==
The body length of the male holotype is 4.3 mm. The colour is yellowish-brown.

== Distribution and habitat ==
The species occurs in North West Australia. The type locality is Old Napier Downs Cave (KN-1) in the Napier Range of the Kimberley region.

== Behaviour ==
The short-tailed whip-scorpions are cave-dwelling, terrestrial predators.
