= Aragua State Anthem =

- State anthem of Aragua, Venezuela
- Lyrics: Ramón Bastidas
- Music: Manuel Betancourt

Audio sample
- file; help

The anthem of the Aragua State, Venezuela, has lyrics composed by Ramón Bastidas, with music made by Manuel Betancourt.

== Lyrics in Spanish ==
Chorus
En el libro que guarda la Fama,
tendrá nuestro nombre soberbio blasón;
el valor, nuestro hermoso oriflama,
y el único escudo será el corazón.

I
Nuestras armas, por siempre triunfales,
humillaron al fiero español,
del clarín a las voces marciales
que oyó en sus montañas la tierra del sol.

II
Nuestro pueblo vibró de coraje
cuando esclava la patria gimió,
como ruge, del yugo al ultraje,
con ira potente soberbio el león.

III
En el campo sangriento de Marte
libertad à la patria ofrendó
la proeza inmortal de Ricaurte,
que en tierra aragueña su Olimpo encontró.

IV
Coronó nuestras cumbres de gloria
cuando Ribas la espada blandió,
y a su homérico Afán La Victoria
con sangre opresora sus campos regó.

== Lyrics in English ==
Chorus
In the book that keeps fame,
our name will have an heroic banner;
bravery, shall be our beautiful flag,
and the only shield will be the heart.

I
Our weapons, for ever triumphant,
humiliated the fierce Spaniard,
from trumpet to the martial voices
that heard in its mountains the land of the sun.

II
our people vibrated from courage
when enslaved our fatherland cried,
how it roars, from yoke to rape,
with powerful rage proudly the lion.

III
in the bloody field of Mars
freedom to the fatherland was offered
by the immortal deed of Ricaurte,
that in Araguan land his Olimpus found.

IV
Crowned with glory were our hills
when Ribas the sword brandished,
and in his Homeric pursuit La Victoria
with oppressing blood its fields sprayed.

== See also ==
- List of anthems of Venezuela
