= Flag of Baruta Municipality, Miranda =

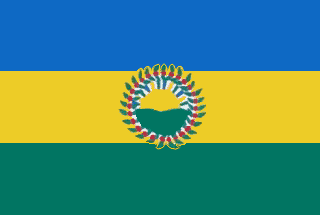

The flag of Baruta Municipality is yellow, green, and blue. It was designed by Yoana Carolina Martínez.

== See also ==
- Anthem of the Baruta Municipality
- Baruta Municipality
- Venezuela
