= Apozomus yirrkala =

Scientific classification
- Kingdom: Animalia
- Phylum: Arthropoda
- Subphylum: Chelicerata
- Class: Arachnida
- Order: Schizomida
- Family: Hubbardiidae
- Genus: Apozomus
- Species: A. yirrkala

Binomial name
- Apozomus yirrkala Harvey, 1992

Species of short-tailed whip-scorpion

Apozomus yirrkala is a species of short-tailed whip-scorpions, also known as schizomids, in the Hubbardiidae family. It is endemic to Australia. It was described in 1992 by Australian arachnologist Mark Harvey. The specific epithet yirrkala refers to the type locality.

== Distribution and habitat ==
The species occurs in the Top End of the Northern Territory. The type locality is Yirrkala Mission in the East Arnhem Region. The schizomids were found in plant litter.

== Behaviour ==
The short-tailed whip-scorpions are terrestrial predators.
