= Apozomus cactus =

Scientific classification
- Kingdom: Animalia
- Phylum: Arthropoda
- Subphylum: Chelicerata
- Class: Arachnida
- Order: Schizomida
- Family: Hubbardiidae
- Genus: Apozomus
- Species: A. cactus

Binomial name
- Apozomus cactus Harvey, 1992

Species of short-tailed whip-scorpion

Apozomus cactus is a species of short-tailed whip-scorpions, also known as schizomids, in the Hubbardiidae family. It is endemic to Australia. It was described in 1992 by Australian arachnologist Mark Harvey.

== Distribution and habitat ==
The species occurs in Far North Queensland. The type locality is the West Claudie River, Iron Range, on the Cape York Peninsula. The schizomids were found in closed forest plant litter.

== Behaviour ==
The short-tailed whip-scorpions are terrestrial predators.
