= Mérida State Anthem =

- State anthem of Mérida, Venezuela
- Lyrics: Antonio Febres Cordero
- Music: Gil Antonio Gil

The anthem of Mérida State, Venezuela, was written by Antonio Febres Cordero. The music was added by Gil Antonio Gil. Like the anthems of Cojedes and Guárico, it has only one stanza.

== Lyrics in Spanish ==
Chorus
Con orgullo lancemos al viento
la canción de la tierra natal
de confín a confín que resuene
de la Sierra la marcha triunfal.

I
Del preciado laurel se corona
como madre de sabios varones
y figura su timbre guerrero
esculpidos en sus patrios blasones;
porque fue de las siete Provincias
que ganaron la heráldica estrella
y por eso muy alto en los Fastos
cual sus níveas montañas descuellan.

== See also ==
- List of anthems of Venezuela
