= Táchira State Anthem =

- State anthem of Táchira, Venezuela
- Lyrics: Ramón Eugenio Vargas
- Music: Miguel Ángel Espinel
- Adopted: 1912

Audio sample
- Anthem of Táchira State: file; help

The anthem of the Táchira State, Venezuela, was written by Ramón Eugenio Vargas; the music was composed by Miguel Ángel Espinel. It was adopted in 1912, after a contest promoted by the regional government. The current anthem is the third made for the state.

== Lyrics in Spanish Language ==
Chorus
Las glorias de la Patria,
sus fueros de Nación,
unidos defendamos
con ínclito valor.

I
Somos libres. Las férreas cadenas
del esclavo rompiéronse ya;
el hogar tachirense sonríe
bajo un sol todo luz:La igualdad.

II
Extinguidos los odios añejos
Perseguimos un solo ideal:
Que prospere la tierra nativa
Bajo un cielo de amor y de paz.

III
El trabajo es la fuerza suprema
Que nos lleva cual nuevo Titán
A la meta sublime y gloriosa
De los pueblos que saben triunfar.

IV
Que en el Táchira ondule por siempre
como enseña de honor regional,
con la unión y altivez de sus hijos,
el trabajo, la paz, la igualdad.

== See also ==
- List of anthems of Venezuela
