= Lara State Anthem =

- State anthem of Lara, Venezuela
- Lyrics: Juan Bautista Oviedo
- Music: Pedro Istúriz

The anthem for Lara State, Venezuela, has lyrics written by Juan Bautista Oviedo; the music was composed by Pedro Istúriz.

The Lara State Anthem was instituted by the government of this federal entity in decrees of November 2/1910, and May 27/1911, with modifications to its original version by decree 123 published in Extraordinary Official Gazette No. 126 dated July 4, 1996.

It consists of two stanzas: the first of sixteen (16) verses and the second of twelve (12) verses.

== Lyrics in Spanish Language ==
Chorus
Gloria al pueblo mil veces altivo
que ha sabido la historia ilustrar;
indomable, pujante en la guerra,
y a la ley respetuosa en la paz.

I
Cuando el grito sublime de Patria
en el mundo vibró de Colón,
al sonar el clarín de los libres,
que a sus hijos llamaba, escuchó.

II
Procedidos del Dios de Colombia
sus guerreros al campo lanzó
y con Lara, Jiménez y Torres,
hizo trizas el yugo español.

III
Pueblo noble, que sabe ser grande
cuando así lo reclama el honor.
Quiera el cielo que siempre sus hijos
rindan culto ferviente a la unión.

IV
Que Pomona le brinde sus dones,
paz y dicha la diaria labor,
Y que el faro triunfal del progreso
Ilumine su vasta región.

== See also ==
- List of anthems of Venezuela
