= Quail Island (Northern Territory) =

Island of Northern Territory, Australian

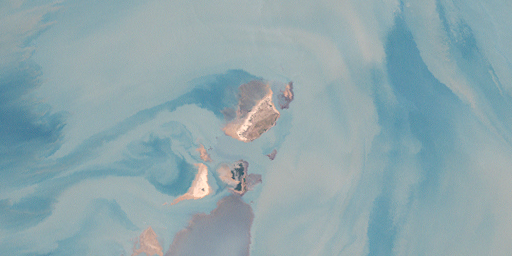
- LANDSAT true color image of Quail Island Group, Northern Territory, Australia
- Interactive map of Quail Island

Geography
- Coordinates: 12.519°S 130.435°E
- Archipelago: Quail Island Group
- Total islands: 3

Administration
- Australia
- Territory: Northern Territory
- Region: Top End
- Bay: Beagle Gulf
- Locality: Bynoe Harbour

Quail Island is an island in the Northern Territory of Australia in the Beagle Gulf about 40 kilometres (25 mi) from the territory capital of Darwin.

Quail Island belongs to the Quail Island Group. The other two islands in the archipelago are Bare Sand Island (southwest of Quail Island) and Djadjalbit Island (south).

The islands are known for being a breeding ground for flatback turtles.

== History ==
On 9 October 1881 when SS Brisbane, an 85.8 metres long passenger, cargo and mail ship, built by A & J Inglis, Pointhouse, Glasgow, struck the nearby Fish Reef, while heading there with cargo from Hong Kong.

=== Quail Island Air Weapons Range ===
The Quail Island Air Weapons Range was used a training ground for defense forces from 1945 to 1979. There are large munitions scattered around the island as a result. A three-year clean-up began in 2011 to remove hazards such as unexploded ordnance. Visitors such as tourists and recreational anglers have been banned from the islands during the clean-up process.

== See also ==
- Islands of the Northern Territory
- List of islands of Australia
