= Yaracuy State Anthem =

- State anthem of Yaracuy, Venezuela
- Lyrics: Pedro María Sosa
- Music: Abdón Ramírez

The anthem of the Yaracuy State, Venezuela, was written by Pedro María Sosa; the music was composed by Abdón Ramírez.

== Lyrics in Spanish Language ==
Chorus

Alto la fama pregona
mis gloriosas tradiciones,
la opulencia de mi zona,
la virtud de mis varones

I
Dominaba la España invasora
mis extensas y ricas comarcas
repletando insaciable, sus arcas
con la savia vital de mi flora.
el soberbio castillo almenado
que en el puerto cabello se ostenta
fue construido con oro esquilmado
a mi zona feraz, opulenta.

II
A tal punto llegó la crueldad
que mi pueblo con voz varonil
en la fecha gloriosa de abril
entusiasta gritó ¡libertad¡
yo no quise acatar la regencia
y firmé con patriótico empeño
aquella acta que el pueblo avileño
con orgullo exclamó: ¡independencia!

III
De Bolívar la fúlgida estrella
con denuedo mis hijos siguieron
y mis fueros sagrados hubieron
en aquella sangrienta epopeya;
persiguiendo el audaz español
mis guerreros en triunfo llegaron
al Perú que también libertaron
¡donde tuvo sus templos el sol!

IV
El progreso, esplendente fanal
con su mágica luz ilumina
la semilla del bien que germina
en mi hermoso jardín tropical;
elementos contengo, prolijos,
honra y prez de mi noble existencia;
en la paz, en la guerra, en la ciencia,
¡porque en todo culminan mis hijos!

V
Mientras riegue mis valles el río
Yaracuy que su nombre me ha dado
de la unión federal seré estado
y mis pueblos tendrán su albedrío;
y si el hado fatal me obligara
de la patria a no izar la bandera:
¡que perezca mi raza altanera
cual mi tribu inmortal Jirajara!

== See also ==
- List of anthems of Venezuela
