= Portuguesa State Anthem =

- State anthem of Portuguesa, Venezuela
- Lyrics: Fernando Eduardo Delgado
- Music: Jesús Alvarado

The anthem for the Portuguesa State, Venezuela, was composed by Fernando Eduardo Delgado; the musical part was done by Jesús Alvarado.

== Lyrics in Spanish Language ==
Chorus
Loor al pueblo que el cruel vasallaje
del Ibérico León combatió,
castigando los ruines ultrajes
a la patria su vida ofrendó.

I
Hasta el confín lejano
de la extensa llanura
asombra tu bravura,
tu arrojo, tu valor.

Resuelto, noble, leal
luchando hasta morir,
prefiere sucumbir
altivo y con honor.

II
Mimado por la gloria
propicio a la fortuna,
fuiste de Páez la cuna,
de Unda, Castejón.

Héroes que en la contienda,
con ínclitas proezas
borraron las vilezas
del yugo y la opresión.

Grandioso es el recuerdo
que dejas en la historia,
sagrada es tu memoria
en nuestro corazón.

III
Es tu suelo fecundo
la sangre generosa
se derramó copiosa
con valor y lealtad.

Araure lo pregona:
el "Batallón sin Nombre"
adquiere allí su nombre,
bandera y dignidad.

IV
Bajo el cielo esplendente
que a tus selvas corona,
la esmeraldina zona
de sombra se cubrió.

Fue cruento el sacrificio,
más en recia pujanza
al golpe de la lanza
la tiranía se hundió.

Y siempre los tiranos
verán en tú diadema
como fúlgido lema:
"Atrás la usurpación"

== See also ==
- List of anthems of Venezuela
