= Miranda State Anthem =

Himno del Estado Miranda
English: Miranda State Anthem
- Regional anthem of Venezuela
- Lyrics: Jacinto Áñez
- Music: Germán Lira
- Adopted: 1909

The anthem of the Miranda State, Venezuela, has lyrics by Jacinto Áñez; and music composed by Germán Lira. It honors Francisco de Miranda and was adopted as the official anthem on December 22, 1909.

== Lyrics ==
Spanish

— Coro —
Gloria al héroe inmortal que destaca
Su bizarra figura de la historia
Del cenit a la negra Carraca
Como pródiga fuente de gloria.

— I —
Cruza el suelo infecundo
Donde fuerzas arteras
Arrebatan al mundo
Su don de libertad;
No respeta fronteras
En los pueblos que gimen;
Ante el odio y el crimen
Su deber es luchar.

— II —
Si España le fulmina
detrás de sus altares
Inglaterra ilumina
Su sendero inmortal;
Desprecia de los zares
La codicia ofrenda
Porque falta a su tienda
La dulce libertad.

— III —
Francia le abre sus brazos
Despedazado el pecho,
Porque a duros zarpazos
Un trono derrumbó;
Y el humano derecho
Al erguirse triunfante
Vio el esfuerzo pujante
De Miranda en acción.

English

— Chorus —
Glory to the inmortal hero that makes stand out
His bizarre figure from the history
Of the zenith in the dark Carraca
As a prodigal source of glory.

— I —
Crosses the sterile soil
Where cunning forces
Take away from the world
Its gift of liberty;
He doesn't respect frontiers
In the moaning towns;
Towards hate and crime
His duty is to fight.

(Chorus)

— II —
If Spain fulminates him
Behind its altars
England illuminates
His immortal path;
Rejects from the tzars
The greed offer
Because his tent is missing
The sweet liberty.

(Chorus)

— III —
France opens its arms for him
Shattered his chest,
Because against hard lashes
A throne demolished;
And the upright human
When erected triumphant
Saw the struggling effort
Of Miranda in action.

(Chorus)

== See also ==
- Miranda (state)
- Francisco de Miranda
- List of anthems of Venezuela
