= SS Brisbane =

Coordinates: 12°26′00″S 130°26′18″E

History

Australia
- Namesake: Brisbane
- Owner: Eastern & Australian Mail Steamship Co Ltd
- Builder: A. & J. Inglis, Pointhouse, Glasgow, Scotland
- Yard number: 110
- Launched: 3 June 1874
- Commissioned: 21 October 1874: Registered at London
- Fate: Struck Fish Reef off Quail Island, 10 October 1881

General characteristics
- Type: Iron steamship
- Tonnage: 891 nrt
- Displacement: 1503 grt
- Length: 281.5 ft
- Beam: 32.2 ft
- Depth: 17.6 ft
- Installed power: 250 nhp
- Propulsion: 2 x inverted compound engines

SS Brisbane was an 85.8 metres long passenger, cargo and mail ship, built by A & J Inglis, Pointhouse, Glasgow, launched in 1874. It was owned by the Eastern & Australian Mail Steamship Co Ltd.

On 10 October 1881 it struck the Fish Reef near Quail Island, 26 miles from Port Darwin, while heading there with cargo from Hong Kong. All passengers and crew were landed safely. However within a fortnight the stranded Brisbane had broken her back and had to be abandoned.
