= Gunn Point =

- Suburb
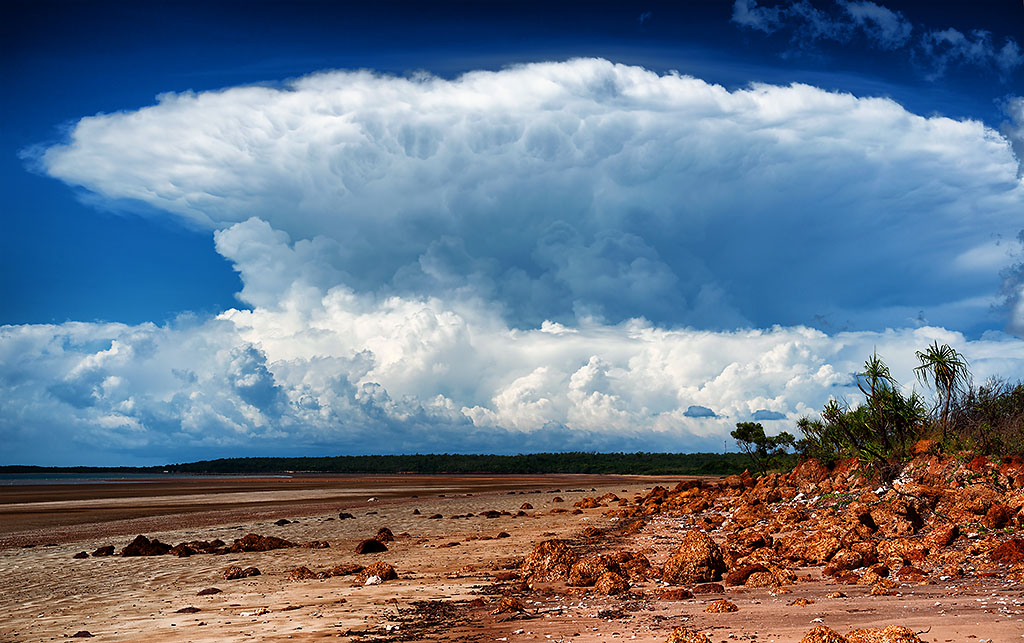
- The cloud named Hector with Gunn Point in the foreground looking North

- Interactive map of Gunn Point
- Country: Australia
- State: Northern Territory
- City: Darwin
- LGA: Litchfield Municipality

Population
  - Total: 4 (2016 census)
Suburbs around Gunn Point
| Beagle Gulf | Beagle Gulf; Vernon Islands | Vernon Islands |
| Beagle Gulf | Gunn Point | Glyde Point |
| Beagle Gulf | Beagle Gulf; Murrumujuk | Koolpinyah |

Gunn Point is a peninsula and suburb/locality located around 70 kilometres by road northeast of Darwin, Northern Territory, Australia, and is a fishing, camping and leisure destination.

Murrumujuk Beach is a 5.5 kilometre stretch of beach located on the western side of the Gunn Point Peninsula. The beach is a multi-use area shared by people, vehicles, horse riders and wildlife.
