= Sucre State Anthem =

- State anthem of Sucre, Venezuela
- Lyrics: Ramón David León
- Music: Benigno Rodríguez Bruzual

The anthem of the Sucre State, Venezuela, has lyrics written by Ramón David León; the music was added by Benigno Rodríguez Bruzual.

== Lyrics in Spanish Language ==
Chorus
¡Pueblo altivo! Blasona la Historia
de tus hijos la gesta marcial,
te da Sucre su nombre de gloria
y Ayacucho su lauro inmortal.

I
Tres cuarteles tu Escudo prestigian,
y en el oro, el zafir y escarlata
de tu pueblo figuran la grata
armonía de dones de paz;
en el cuerno colmado de frutos,
la bondad prodigiosa del suelo,
y en la palma que se alza hacia el cielo,
¡heroísmo, virtud, libertad!

II
El dorado esplendor de tus playas
es promesa de pan laborioso,
como es tu pasado glorioso,
de un futuro de pródigo bien;
la más bella porción de Oriente
en fronteras cordiales encierras
y es silvestre en tus pródigas tierras
el prestigio marcial del laurel.

III
En ti se une por gracia remota
el laurel al olivo sagrado,
convertiste la espada en arado
y tus dianas en himnos de amor.
Como en cumbre eminente culmina
de tus pueblos la fama procera,
y es el nombre de Sucre, bandera
en perenne demanda de ¡Unión!

== See also ==
- List of anthems of Venezuela
