= Vernon, West Virginia =

Unincorporated community in West Virginia, US

Coordinates: 38.7112126°N 80.4942540°W

Vernon is an unincorporated community in Braxton County, in the U.S. state of West Virginia.

== History ==
A post office called Vernon was established in 1915, and remained in operation until 1940. The town name of Vernon was selected by a local child for unknown reasons.
