= Vernon (1839 ship) =

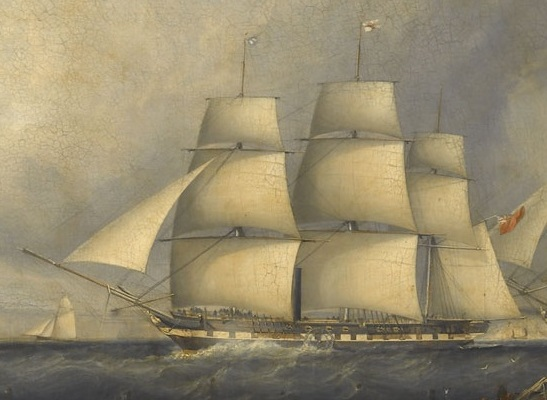
- A painting of Vernon by John Lynn

History
- Name: Vernon
- Owner: Green Blackwall Line (1839–1867); Colony of New South Wales (1867–1893)
- Builder: Greens' Blackwall Yard, London
- Completed: 1839
- Fate: Burnt out

General characteristics
- Tonnage: 911 GRT

Vernon was a 911-ton paddle steamer built in 1839 by Greens' Blackwall Yard, London, for the Green Blackwall Line. After her engines proved uneconomic, she had her paddles removed and she was converted into a sailing vessel. She was used on the passenger trade to the Colonies in the 19th century.

Vernon was sold in 1867 to the Colony of New South Wales as a reformatory and training ship for boys moored between the Government Domain and Garden Island in Sydney. In 1871, she was moored off Cockatoo Island. Sobraon replaced Vernon in 1892 and was sold to Messrs. Rae and Surge for £180. While being broken up in Kerosene Bay on 29 May 1893, she caught fire and was burnt to the waterline.
