= Vernon Automobile Corporation =

Defunct American motor vehicle manufacturer

The Vernon Automobile Corporation was a car company from Vernon, New York, which between 1915 and 1920 produced a small eight-cylinder (167.8 cubic inches (2,750 cc)) car called the "Able Eight", in a number of body styles.

== Models ==
One source lists three models produced:

Vernon 8 De Luxe, 1921 MY- 8 cylinder engine of 3195 cm3, with side valve valve gear, 2 valves per cylinder, producing 70 bhp (71 PS/52 kW) at 3000 rpm. In common with the other models listed here, it had a 3 speed manual gearbox. This model weighed 1021 kg.

1919 Vernon 419 Phaeton- a 4-door tourer bodied car with 4-cylinder side-vale engine of 2011 cm3 producing 45 bhp (45.6 PS/33.6 kW). It weighed 680 kg.

1919 Vernon 819 Phaeton- a 4-door tourer bodied car with 8-cylinder side-vale engine of 2840 cm3 producing 62 bhp (63 PS/46 kW), and weighing 953 kg.
