= Copla =

Copla (a Spanish word) may refer to:

- Copla (poetry), a poetic form common in Spanish popular writing.
- Copla (music), a musical genre related to that poetic form.
