= Inocente Carreño =

Venezuelan composer and academic (1919–2016)

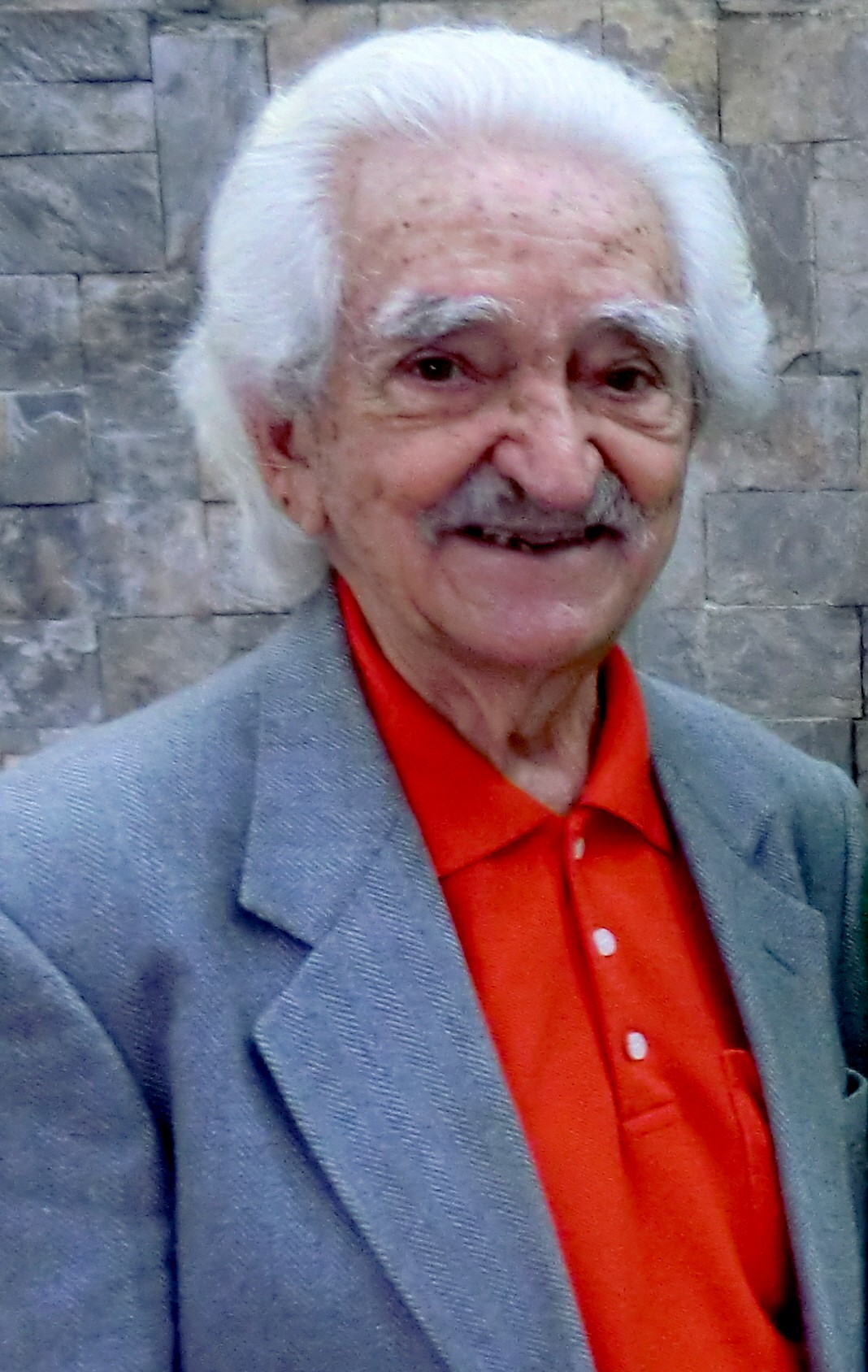
- Carreño in 2012
- Born: 28 December 1919; Porlamar, Venezuela
- Died: 29 June 2016 (aged 96)

Inocente José Carreño (28 December 1919 – 29 June 2016) was a Venezuelan composer and academic. He won the Venezuelan National Prize for Music in 1989.

Carreño died 29 June 2016, aged 96.

== See also ==
- Venezuela
- Venezuelan music
