= Vernon Islands Conservation Reserve =

Protected area in the Northern Territory, Australia

- IUCN category V (protected landscape/seascape)
- Location within Northern Territory
- Location: Northern Territory, Vernon Islands
- Nearest city: Darwin
- Coordinates: 12°02′36″S 131°02′48″E
- Area: 81.58 km^{2} (31.50 sq mi)
- Established: 19 April 1974

Vernon Islands Conservation Reserve is a protected area in the Northern Territory of Australia located in the locality of Vernon Islands about 50 kilometres (31 mi) north-east of the territory capital of Darwin.

The conservation reserve consists of the Vernon Islands, an island group consisting of three islands - East Vernon Island, Northwest Vernon Island and Southwest Vernon Island, and a nearby reef known as Knight Reef which is exposed at low tide.

The conservation reserve first acquired protected area status as a crown reserve declared under section 103 of the Crown Lands Ordinance on 30 April 1974 by the Australian government. In 1979, the crown reserve was renamed under the Territory Parks and Conservation Act as the Vernon Islands Conservation Reserve.

The conservation reserve’s legal status has been effectively put aside because the land under protection was the subject of a claim lodged in 1978 under the Aboriginal Land Rights (Northern Territory) Act 1976. The claim was subsequently resolved with revised legislation being assented on 11 December 2015 and with the title of the land being given to the Mantiyupwi Tiwi people on 12 March 2018.

In early 2018, the conservation reserve was not listed on the Northern Territory Government’s official list of protected areas.

In 2016, the conservation reserve was described in a document published by the Australian government as being categorized as an IUCN Category V protected area.

== See also ==
- Protected areas of the Northern Territory
