= Clarence Strait (Northern Territory) =

- Map showing the layout of Van Diemen Gulf with Clarence Strait on the west side.

- Location within Northern Territory
- Coordinates: 12°0′S 131°0′E
- Type: Strait
- Etymology: Duke of Clarence
- Basin countries: Australia
- Max. length: 20 nautical miles (37 km; 23 mi)
- Max. width: 13 nautical miles (24 km; 15 mi)

Satellite imagery of Clarence Straight on 24 June 2019.

Clarence Strait in northern Australia separates Melville Island from the mainland of Australia. It also connects the Beagle Gulf in the west to the Van Diemen Gulf in the east. It is approximately 50 km (31 mi) north of the city of Darwin.

== Administrative status ==
On 4 April 2007, most of the area occupied by the Clarence Strait was gazetted by the Northern Territory Government as a locality with the name, Vernon Islands. The locality has not been added to any existing local government area and is considered to be part of the Northern Territory's unincorporated areas.
