= Van Diemen Gulf =

Gulf in northern Australia

- Pitchenelumbo (Iwaidja language)
- Map showing the layout of Van Diemen Gulf. Darwin is in lower left corner.

- Location within Northern Territory
- Coordinates: 11°49′S 131°57′E
- Type: Gulf
- Etymology: Anthony van Diemen.
- Basin countries: Australia
- Max. length: 75 nautical miles (139 km; 86 mi)
- Max. width: 45 nautical miles (83 km; 52 mi)

Van Diemen Gulf is a gulf in the Northern Territory of Australia. It connects to the Timor Sea in the north via Dundas Strait. Most of its area is also gazetted as a locality with the name Van Diemen Gulf.

== History ==
The gulf was named after the Dutch colonial governor, Anthony van Diemen (1593–1645).

Phillip Parker King and his crew in the 76-tonne cutter HMS Mermaid surveyed the coastline in early 1818, encountering local Aboriginal people and proas sailed by Makassans, and passed by the Gulf on other voyages.

== Geography ==
The gulf connects to the Timor Sea in the north via Dundas Strait, and is also connected to the Beagle Gulf in the west by the Clarence Strait. It is partially enclosed by Melville Island and the Cobourg Peninsula, and measures about 140 kilometres (90 mi) by 80 kilometres (50 mi).

Rivers draining into the Gulf include the South Alligator River, the East Alligator River, the Mary River, Wildman River and the Adelaide River. The Kakadu National Park adjoins its south-east coast.

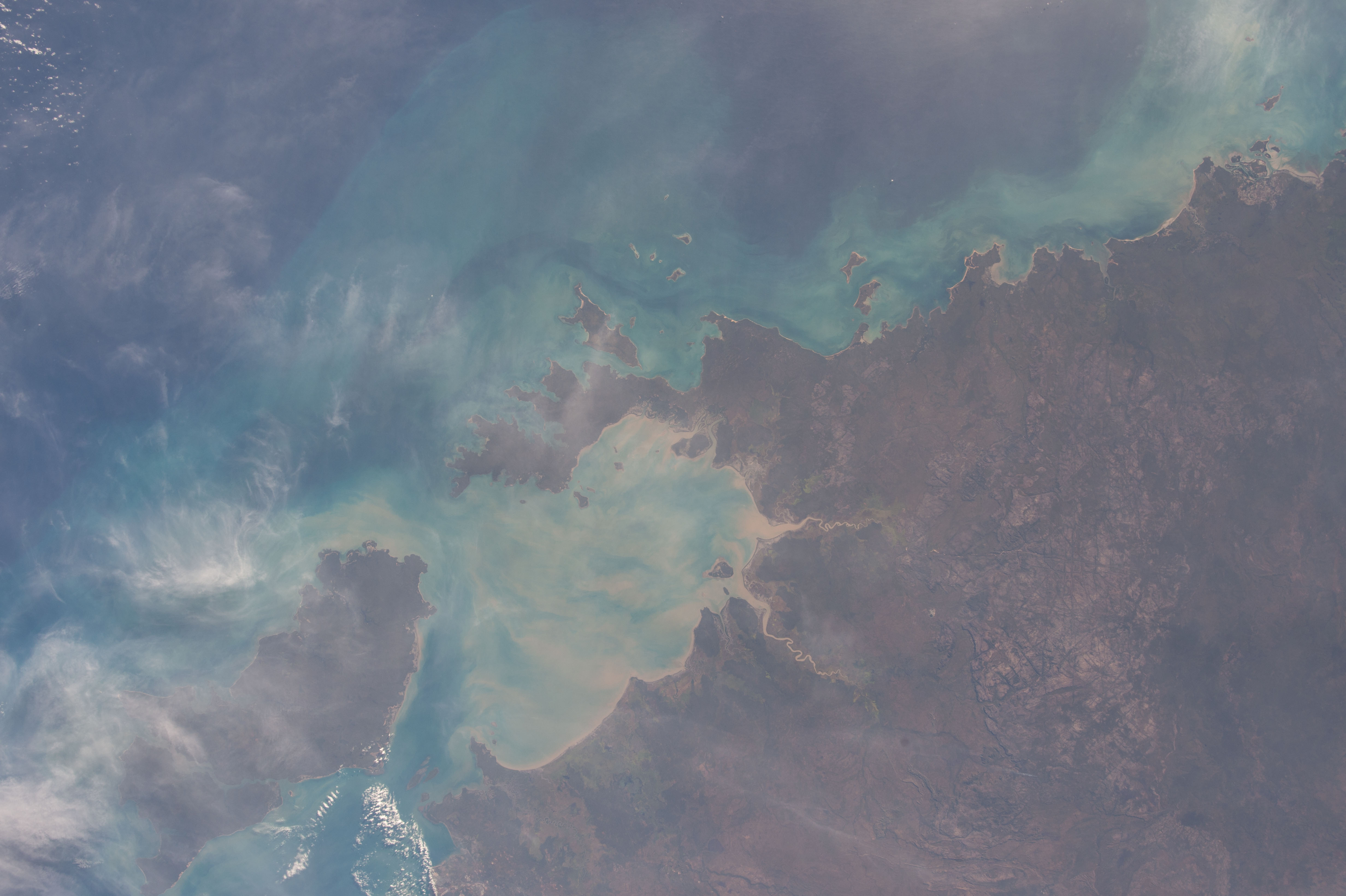
Photo of part of the Van Diemen Gulf taken from the International Space Station, April 2015

== Administrative status ==
On 4 April 2007, most of the area occupied by the Van Diemen Gulf was gazetted as a locality with the name Van Diemen Gulf by the Northern Territory Government, who also included it in the local government area of the West Arnhem Region.
