= Beagle Gulf =

Bay in Northern Territory, Australia

- Location within Northern Territory
- Coordinates: 12°09′37″S 130°29′23″E
- Type: Gulf
- Etymology: HMS Beagle
- Basin countries: Australia

Beagle Gulf is a gulf in the Northern Territory of Australia which opens on its west side to the Timor Sea. The gulf is bounded to the south by the mainland and to the north by Bathurst and Melville Islands. It is connected to Van Diemen Gulf in the east by Clarence Strait. Its south coast includes the natural harbours of Darwin and Bynoe. It is approximately 100 km long and 50 km wide. It surrounds the Quail Island Group.

== Name ==
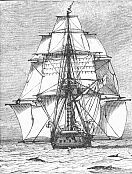
HMS Beagle

Beagle Gulf was named after the ship HMS Beagle, on which Charles Darwin and Robert Fitzroy sailed around parts of Australia. The Cambridge Dictionary of Australian Places incorrectly states that "it was named in 1836 by Robert Fitzroy, commander of HMS Beagle, after his ship. The Beagle charted the area with Charles Darwin aboard as naturalist." However, Darwin and Fitzroy sailed in 1836 from King George's Sound (Western Australia) directly to the Cocos-Keeling Islands, at the south coast of Java, and from there to Cape Town and back to England. They stayed away from Beagle Gulf by 3000 sea miles and did not know of its existence. The gulf was actually named by Captain John Clements Wickham, commanding HMS Beagle during its survey of northern Australia in 1837-1838, at the beginning of her third and last long voyage.

== Protection ==
In 1991 the Northern Territory Government proposed the formation of the Beagle Gulf Marine Park. The proposed Marine Park has a significant commercial, recreational conservation value. Zoning plans enable the broadest possible use of marine parks whilst providing for the protection and conservation of significant ecological, scientific, historical, cultural and scenic sites.

== Administrative status ==
On 4 April 2007, most of the area occupied by the Beagle Gulf was gazetted by the Northern Territory Government as a locality with the name, Beagle Gulf. The locality has not been added to any existing local government area and is considered to be part of the Northern Territory's unincorporated areas.
