= Baralt Municipality =

Administrative division in Zulia, Venezuela

Coordinates: 9°48′N 70°54′W

Baralt Municipality Municipio Baralt
- Municipality

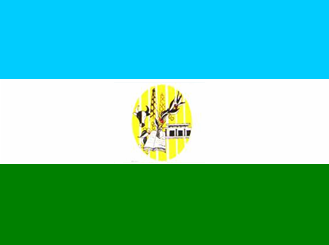
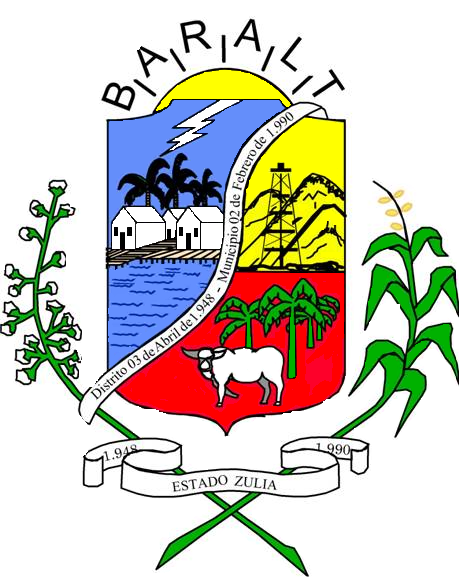
- Flag Seal

- Location in Zulia

- Location in Venezuela
- Country: Venezuela
- State: Zulia
- Founded: 1989
- Municipal seat: San Timoteo

Government
  - Mayor: Samuel Contreras Blanco (PSUV)

Area
  - Total: 3,411.8 km^{2} (1,317.3 sq mi)

Population (2011)
  - Total: 92,080
  - Density: 26.99/km^{2} (69.90/sq mi)
- Time zone: UTC−4 (VET)

Baralt Municipality is a municipality of Venezuela in the state of Zulia. It is located on the eastern coast of Lake Maracaibo and named after diplomat and writer Rafael María Baralt. Its municipal seat is San Timoteo. Established as an independent district on 3 April 1948 following a population spike driven by the early 20th-century oil boom, the predominantly urban municipality had a population of 92,080 people as of the 2011 census.

== History ==
The Baralt Municipality was officially established on 3 April 1948, when Zulia's Legislative Assembly reformed the political-territorial division law to create an independent, autonomous district. Named in honor of the Zulia native, diplomat, and writer Rafael María Baralt, the new territory was carved out of the Sucre District, where it had previously existed as the General Urdaneta parish since 1845. The push for autonomy began between 1943 and 1944 when residents of San Timoteo and Mene Grande formed a committee to petition for independence. This movement was heavily driven by the region's massive early 20th-century oil boom, which caused the population to skyrocket from just 1,191 residents in 1920 to nearly 22,000 by 1950. Furthermore, the territory was geographically isolated from the rest of the Sucre District by portions of Trujillo and lacked a connecting highway until 1956, making it isolated administratively.

== Demographics ==
Based on the 2011 Venezuelan census, The population of the Baralt Municipality was 92,080 people, accounting for 2.4% of the total population of the state of Zulia. The capital and municipal seat of Baralt is the town of San Timoteo, even though only 5.7% of the municipality's population resides there.

By June 2019, official projections from the Venezuelan Statistics National Institute estimated the population of Baralt as 104,429 people, representing an annual growth rate of 1.6% since 2011 and showing a population density of 47.23 inhabitants/km². However, these projections do not account for the impact of emigration linked to the country's recent economic and political circumstances.

The gender distribution of the population was 51.1% men (45,926) and 48.9% women (43,921). The age distribution showed that the largest segment of the population was aged 15 to 64, comprising 63.7% of the people. Younger people aged 0 to 14 made up 31.5% of the population, while those aged 65 and older accounted for the remaining 4.8%. The municipality is more urbanized than rural, with 74.1% of inhabitants (66,600) living in urban centers compared to 25.9% (23,247) in rural areas.

Ethnically, the municipality identified as predominantly Mestizo (57.9%) and White people (37.8%). Minority groups included 2.8% Afro-Venezuelans and 1.2% indigenous people as well as another 218 individuals belonging to other ethnic groups. The literacy rate was 90.8%, with 6,540 inhabitants of Baralt not able to read or write.
