= Timoteo =

Timoteo may refer to:

- Timoteo (given name)
- Timoteo, "El Charro Negro", African-American mariachi
- Timóteo (municipality), Minas Gerais, Brazil
- ArcelorMittal Timóteo, steel manufacturer, Brazil

== See also ==
- San Timoteo (disambiguation)
