= Women in Venezuela =

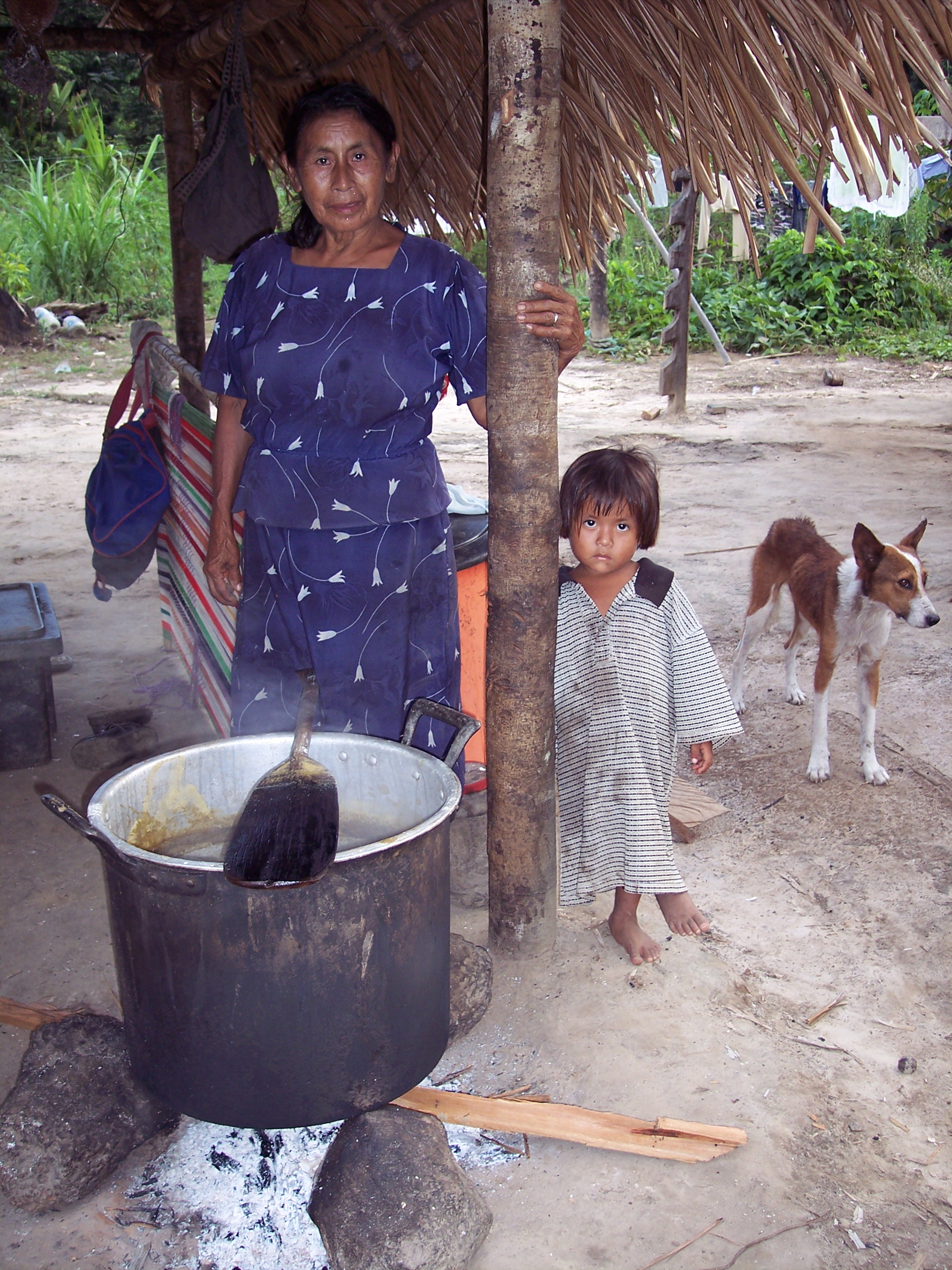
- Canaima National Park, Venezuela

General statistics
- Maternal mortality (per 100,000): 95 (2015)
- Women in parliament: 23%, 38 out of 165 (2019)
- Women over 25 with secondary education: 71.7% (2017)
- Women in labour force: 52% (2018)

Gender Inequality Index
- Value: 0.492 (2021)
- Rank: 123rd out of 191

Global Gender Gap Index
- Value: 0.699 (2021)
- Rank: 91st out of 156

Women in Venezuela have historically played asymmetrical roles in society compared to men. In modern times, Venezuela still faces important challenges related to discrimination, unequal political representation, lack of access to adequate health services and child care, and sex violence.

While notable women have participated in the political history since the Venezuelan War of Independence in the 19th century, universal suffrage was not granted until 1947. Venezuela has established gender equality in its constitution, and is a signatory of the United Nations's Convention on the Elimination of All Forms of Discrimination Against Women.

Miss Venezuela is considered a matter of national pride. Venezuela is one of the countries with more Miss World and Miss Universe titleholders in the world. Many of them have become notable actresses, journalists and politicians in Venezuela. The popularity of beauty pageants has translated into a culture of cosmetics and high levels of female plastic surgery.

Several Venezuelan women are notable for their contributions to the country and to the world's cultural heritage.

== Politics ==
=== Venezuelan independence ===
Women that are considered heroines by the Venezuelan government for their participation in the Venezuelan War of Independence include Manuela Sáenz, Luisa Cáceres de Arismendi, Josefa Camejo, Juana Ramírez, and Eulalia Ramos.

=== 20th century ===
Women’s suffrage in Venezuela was first granted with the Constitution of 1947. Women had started organising around the 1930s and 1940s with the death of dictator Juan Vicente Gómez. But it was not until the 1950s that women from all social classes got involved and not only middle-class women. Women also participated in the guerilla struggles during the 1960s but they did not take leading roles due to the male-dominated organisational character of these combatant groups. In the 1970s through so-called Popular Women's Circles (Círculos Femeninos Populares) women tried to organize autonomously, address the problems of poor women and assist them with health, education and employment initiatives. However, their dependence on outside funding and support of male-ruled NGOs often constrained their goals.

=== 21st century ===
In 2000, president of Venezuela Hugo Chávez appointed Adina Bastidas as vice-president, becoming the first woman to held that office.

The crisis in Venezuela that occurred during the tenure of Chávez's successor Nicolás Maduro resulted with women becoming more reliant on discriminatory social policies of the government, making them more vulnerable if they opposed Maduro's government.

After 2026 United States intervention in Venezuela and the capture of Nicolás Maduro, his vicepresident Delcy Rodríguez became acting president of Venezuela. The first woman to hold that position.

== Laws ==
=== Marriage and family ===
Family law was overhauled in 1982. Cohabitation has increased in Venezuela since the 1990s.

=== Representation ===
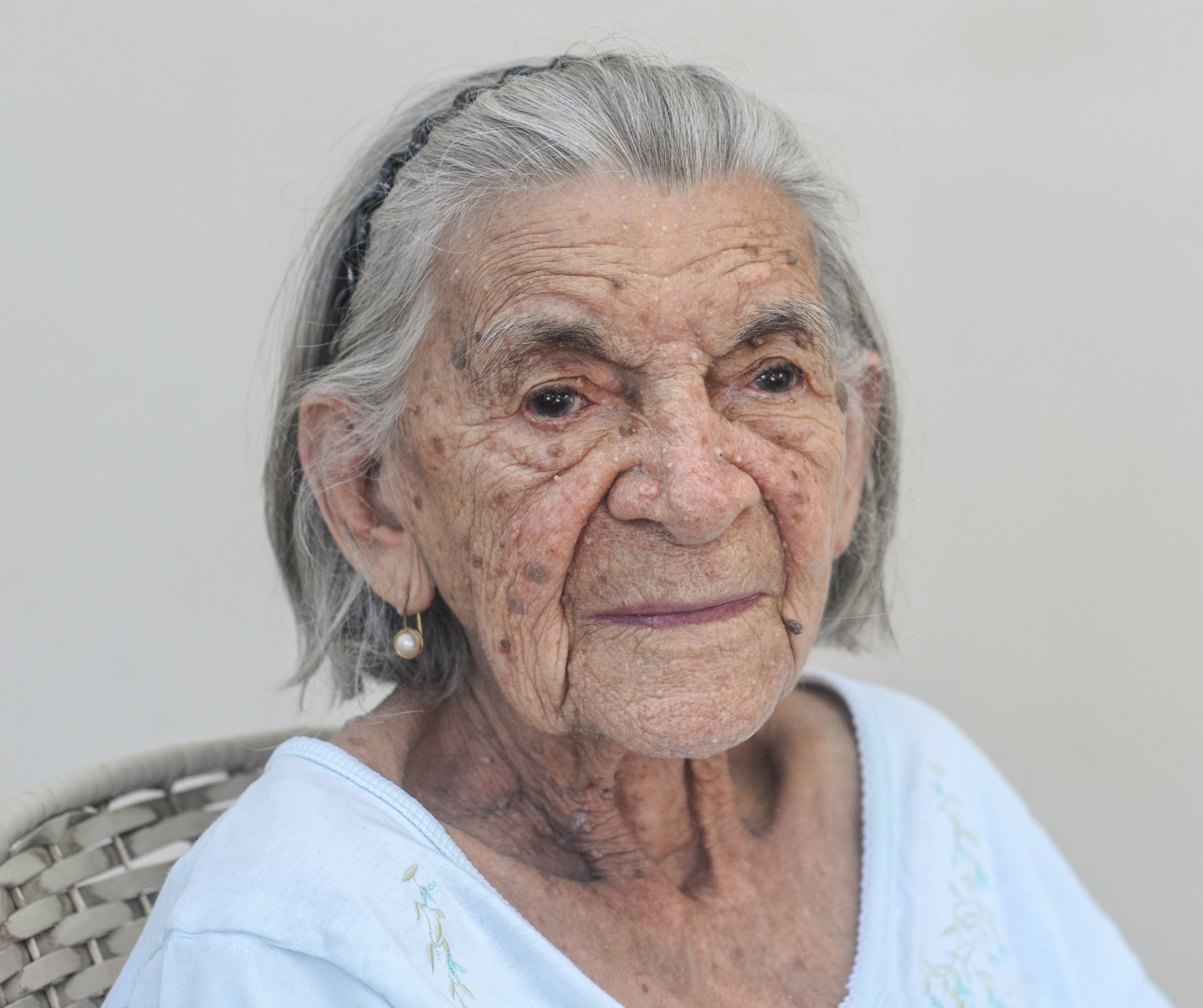
Venezuelan woman of 94 years old from Margarita island.

In 1997, Article 144 of the Suffrage and Political Participation Organic Act established a 30% women quota in the lists of the parliamentary candidates. In 2000 the National Electoral Council suspended this article, declaring it unconstitutional because it violated the equality principle of the Article 21. The expected consequence of this suspension was parity and an increase of the quota to 50%, but this has not been the case due to poor implementations and no measures being taken for infringements of legislations. As of 2019, 38 out of 165 deputies elected to the National Assembly are women. The number of ministries led by female politicians has decreased, compared to Chávez's final cabinet, from 39% to 24%. The Supreme Tribunal with 32 appointed judges (16 women and 16 men) is the only institution in Venezuela that presents parity of gender in its members. At the community level women are increasingly present, which is crucial in the empowerment of lower-class barrio women. Nonetheless, these female leaders of communal councils have reported that their presence is ignored at the higher levels and they are being excluded from political opportunities.

=== Abortion ===
Selective abortion in Venezuelan law is punishable by up to six years in jail. Abortion is only allowed to be performed legally in order to save the life of the woman. Illegal abortions are often carried in precarious conditions, but there are no official statistics.

== Current challenges ==
=== Violence ===
In 2007, the country enacted Ley Organica Sobre el Derecho de las Mujeres a una Vida Libre de Violencia (Organic Law on the Right of Women to a Life Free of Violence).

During the crisis in Venezuela under the government of Nicolás Maduro, women in Venezuela became more vulnerable to sexual violence as a result of weak institutions and socioeconomic difficulties according to the Atlantic Council. The crisis has left Venezuelan women exposed to exploitation through sex trafficking and prostitution.

In 2017, about 2,795 women were murdered based on their gender. With most Venezuelans having a lack of trust in the country's armed forces and public safety, "fewer women are reporting gender-based violence, and femicide has increased by 50%."

=== Health access ===
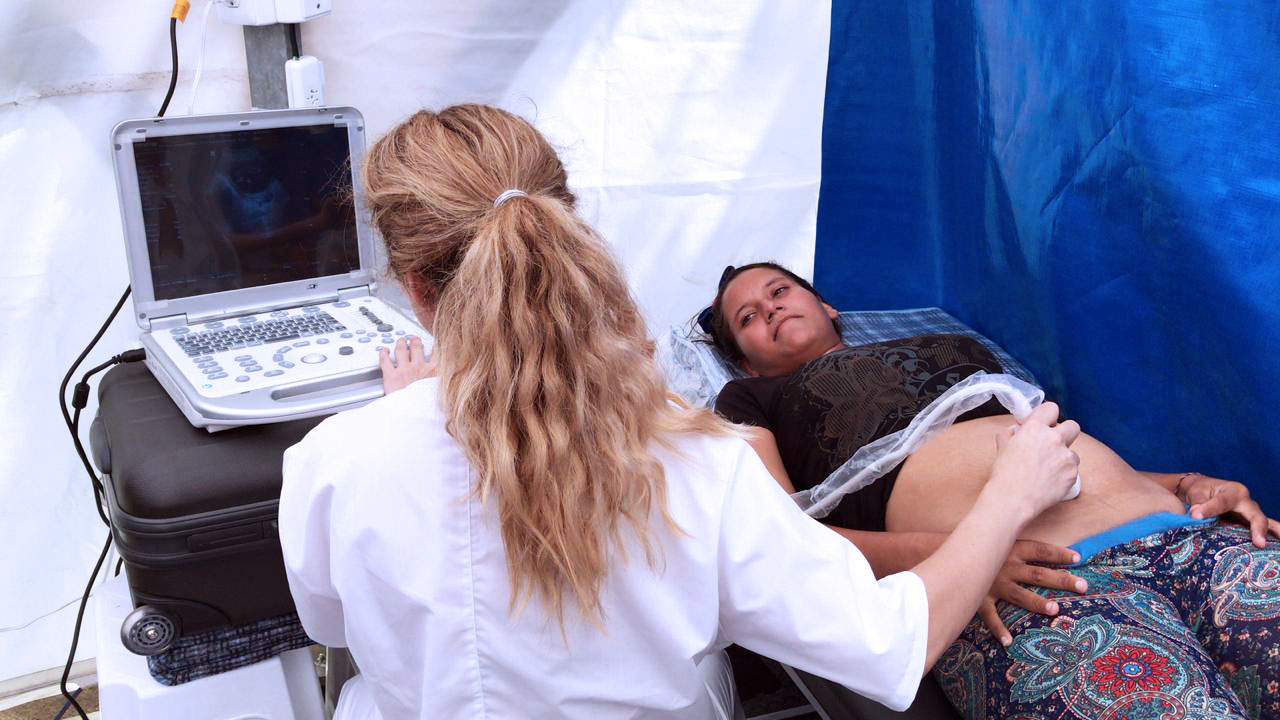
Humanitarian crisis in Venezuela

Due to the ongoing political and economic crisis in Venezuela, the country has been facing challenges in providing basic healthcare services and supplies to its population. The healthcare system has suffered from a lack of investment, shortages of medical equipment and medications, and a significant exodus of healthcare professionals. In an interview report by the Human Rights Watch, doctors and patients reported the shortage and absence of certain medication, including but not limited to: antibiotics, anti-seizure medication, anti-convulsants, muscle relaxants, and painkillers. Unsanitary conditions are caused by short supplies of PPE (personal protective equipment), such as "sterile gloves and gauze, antiseptics, medical alcohol, scalpels, needles, catheters, IV solutions, nebulization kits, and surgical sutures." Consequently, the Venezuelan Health Ministry reports that rates of infant and maternal mortality in 2016 were "substantially higher" than those of previous years. A doctor interviewed by the Human Rights Watch explains the failure in prenatal care in Venezuela:

Preventive medicine is no longer practiced, and in fact, right now, an [expectant] mother finds it difficult to find iron supplements, folic acid, or multivitamins at the pharmacy. Imagine now going to a clinic and getting it for free; that no longer exists. These shortcomings have consequences, including children who are born with a low birth weight or nutritional deficiencies, and for the mothers, infectious problems such as urinary infections that are left untreated. That is why you have a high rate of complications, because these issues are not controlled [by prenatal care]. Then, this results in a high risk of neonatal mortality.

Another challenge facing women, particularly mothers, in Venezuela is the high transmission rate of HIV from mother to child. The usual procedures of antiretroviral medicine use pre-birth, a scheduled caesarean delivery during birth, and post-natal prophylactic treatment of the newborn are no longer widespread protocols in the country. Not only are many infant mortalities inevitable, but so are complicated births and, ultimately, complicated lives for infants and children in Venezuela.

=== Gender roles ===
According to CEPAZ, women in Venezuela are at risk due to gender discrimination and the "hyper-sexualized stereotypes of Venezuelan women". The professional women and businesswomen of Venezuela generally "work hard at looking great" and they "dress to impress"; their business dress include wearing feminine attire.

=== Intersectionality ===
Women in Venezuela are not only susceptible to gender violence and discrimination, but may experience double discrimination if they also belong to another marginalized group. Intersectionality is an analytical framework for understanding how a person's various social and political identities combine to create different modes of discrimination and privilege.

For example, Afro-Venezuelan women may experience discrimination or violence from not only being a woman, but also due to her race as a non-white woman. Discrimination against Afro-Venezuelan women can manifest in the form of racial profiling, limited opportunities for advancement, and disproportionate rates of poverty. Skin and phenotype are methods that global society and its institutions use to perpetuate traditional gender roles and stereotypes. One way traditional gender roles are perpetuated in Venezuelan society is through the Miss Universe Pageant. Latina Magazine, for example, can be argued to portray Latin Americans that challenge these norms and break free from traditional expectations; however, the same magazine can also send conflicting messages about Latin American empowerment, with white-centric beauty standards as advertisements and Miss Universe commentary.

== Beauty pageants ==
External videos
- The strict beauty standards Venezuelan women experience, resulting in insecurity and surgeries on YouTube

Beauty pageants are popular in Venezuela. The New York Times wrote in 1997, that " Venezuela has become the beauty queen factory of the world". Venezuela is one of the countries with more "Miss" pageant winners in the world, holding six Miss World (ranked first) and seven Miss Universe titles (second only to United States). The national pageant Miss Venezuela, broadcast on TV every year, is watched by millions. Many of these titleholders and contestants have continued their careers as notable actresses, journalists and even presidential candidates.

Miss Venezuela title holders are seen as seen as a symbol of national pride. This has promoted attention on beauty products and cosmetic procedures for women. Venezuela has one of the largest rates of cosmetic procedures per capita in the world. Irene Sáez, 1998 presidential candidate and 1981 Miss Universe, said that "''In Venezuela, beauty contests are not a race, they're a religion.'' Raúl Gallegos, wrote in his 2016 book Crude Nation: How Oil Riches Ruined Venezuela, that the oil richness of Venezuela “has nurtured a culture in which looks have primordial importance.”

The contest has been criticized in the past by the Venezuelan feminist movement. Journalist Elizabeth Fuentes recalls how she participated in a feminist rally in 1972, where protesters carried signs next to the pageant venue and tried to spray paint the dresses of the contestants. The protesters were dispersed by the police.

Sociologist Esther Pineda G recognizes the popularity of beauty pageants in Venezuela as an indication of the country's enduring sexism.

Miss Venezuela organization has been accused of arranging agreements between older men and contestants to finance their needs to advance in the contest. Patricia Velásquez, actress and 1989 Miss Venezuela contestant wrote that she was forced to enter in a relationship with an older man to be able to afford plastic surgery. In 2018, Osmel Sousa, director and main coach of the contestants, left the organization after he was accused in social media of allegedly arranging contestants as escort for government officials. Sousa however has denied accusations and he has been backed by previous participants.

== Notable Venezuelan women ==
Throughout history, women in Venezuela have played integral roles in shaping and enriching the nation's cultural landscape through their contributions to music, art, literature and science, and various other creative domains.

=== Arts ===
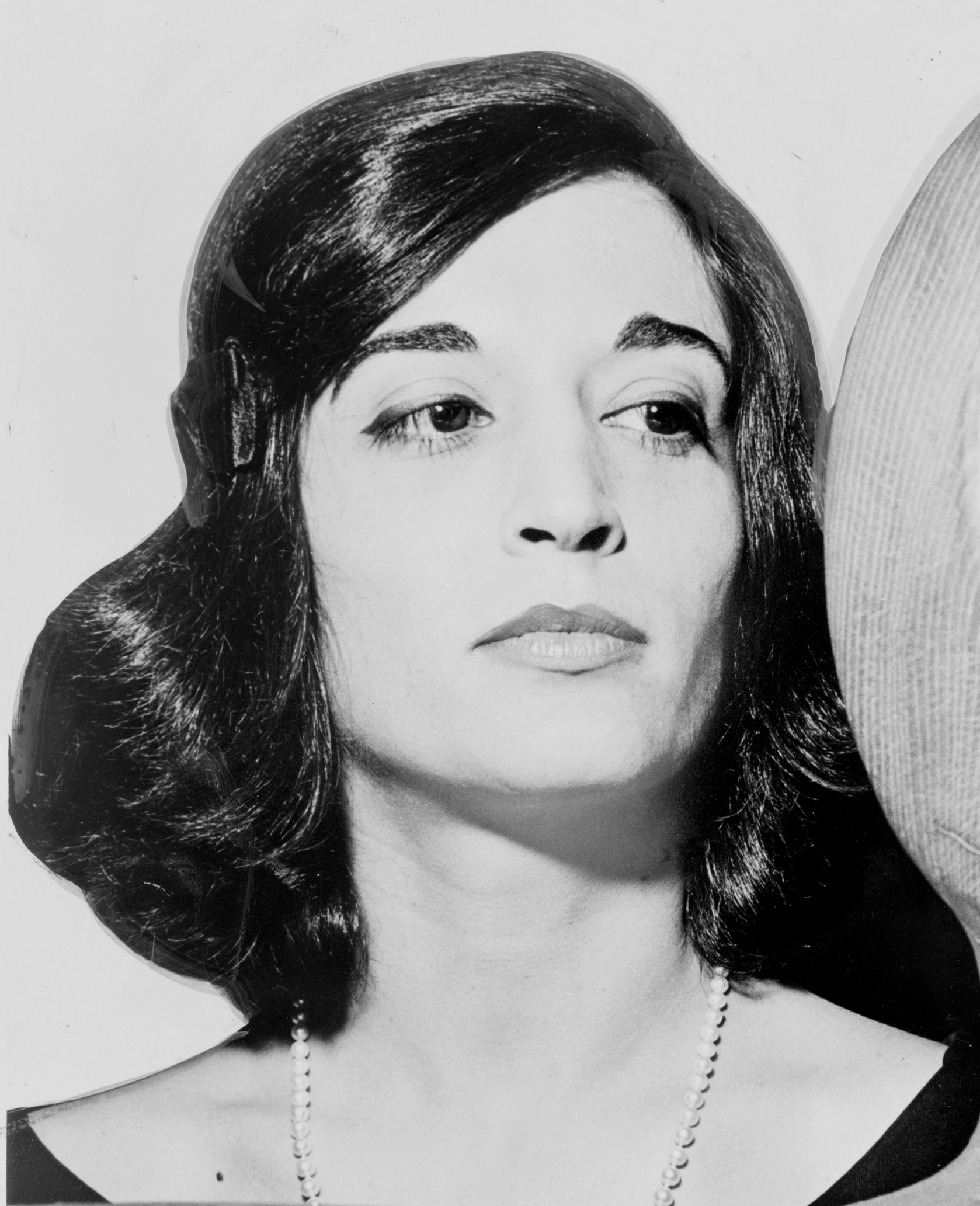
Marisol Escobar, Venezuelan-American artist and sculptor.

- Marisol Escobar, commonly known as Marisol, Venezuelan-American sculptor known for her large-scale works that explored themes of identity and cultural heritage. She gained prominence in the 1960s for her distinctive figurative sculptures that blended Pop art, folk art, and contemporary influences. Marisol's work often depicted portraits of celebrities and political figures, using materials such as wood, plaster, and others to create larger-than-life figures.
- Gego, born Gertrud Goldschmidt in Germany, was a sculptor and printmaker known for her intricate wire sculptures. Her work blurred the boundaries between sculpture and drawing, often exploring light, space, and movement.
- Tecla Tofano, Italian-Venezuelan ceramist, draftswoman, metalsmith, and writer. Her work focused on consumer culture, a direct link to her organization and mobilization of the left-wing political party, "Movimiento al Socialismo."

=== Fashion ===
- Carolina Herrera, American-Venezuelan fashion designer and business woman known for her personal style. She achieved success in women's and men's fashion and fragrances. Her products are worn by various American celebrities. Her company has stores worldwide and billions in sales.
- Nabel Martins, Portuguese-Venezuelan fashion designer who founded her eponymous label with an atelier in Caracas, known for designs that emphasize femininity and timeless elegance.

=== Literature ===
- Teresa de la Parra, novelist and essayist known for her exploration of the roles of women in Venezuelan society. She is best known for her 1924 novel Ifigenia: Diario de una señorita que escribió porque se fastidiaba. The novel explores the life of a young Venezuelan woman in Paris and addresses themes of identity, gender, and societal expectations.
- Ana Teresa Torres, novelist and journalist who has won numerous awards for her work. Her literary works often explore social and political issues in Venezuela, particularly incorporating elements of magical realism and historical fiction. Her acclaimed 1992 novel Doña Inés contra el olvido, portrays the life of a female guerrilla fighter during the Venezuelan War of Independence.

=== Medicine and health ===
- Lya Imber (born in Ukraine) and Sara Bendahan, the first women to complete the degree in medical sciences in Venezuela in the 1930s.
- Susana Raffalli, Venezuelan nutritionist. She is recognized for her humanitarian work on alleviating hunger in Venezuela and in particular during the COVID-19 pandemic in Venezuela. She was listed as BBC's 100 Women in 2020.

=== Music ===
- Teresa Carreño, classical pianist, soprano, composer, and conductor, from the 19th and 20th century. She became an internationally renowned virtuoso pianist and was often referred to as the "Valkyrie of the Piano".
- Maria Teresa Chacín, singer and composer who has won numerous awards and is known for her contributions to the development of Venezuelan music.
- Soledad Bravo, singer, known for her powerful voice and political activism. Bravo's work reflects her involvement in social and political causes, addressing themes of social justice, human rights, and freedom. Throughout her career, she has recorded and performed songs in various languages, gaining international acclaim.
- Glass Marcano, Venezuelan conductor known for her work with the Orquesta Sinfónica Juvenil Simón Bolívar and international performances with leading orchestras. She gained recognition after being a finalist in the La Maestra Competition in Paris.

=== Politics ===
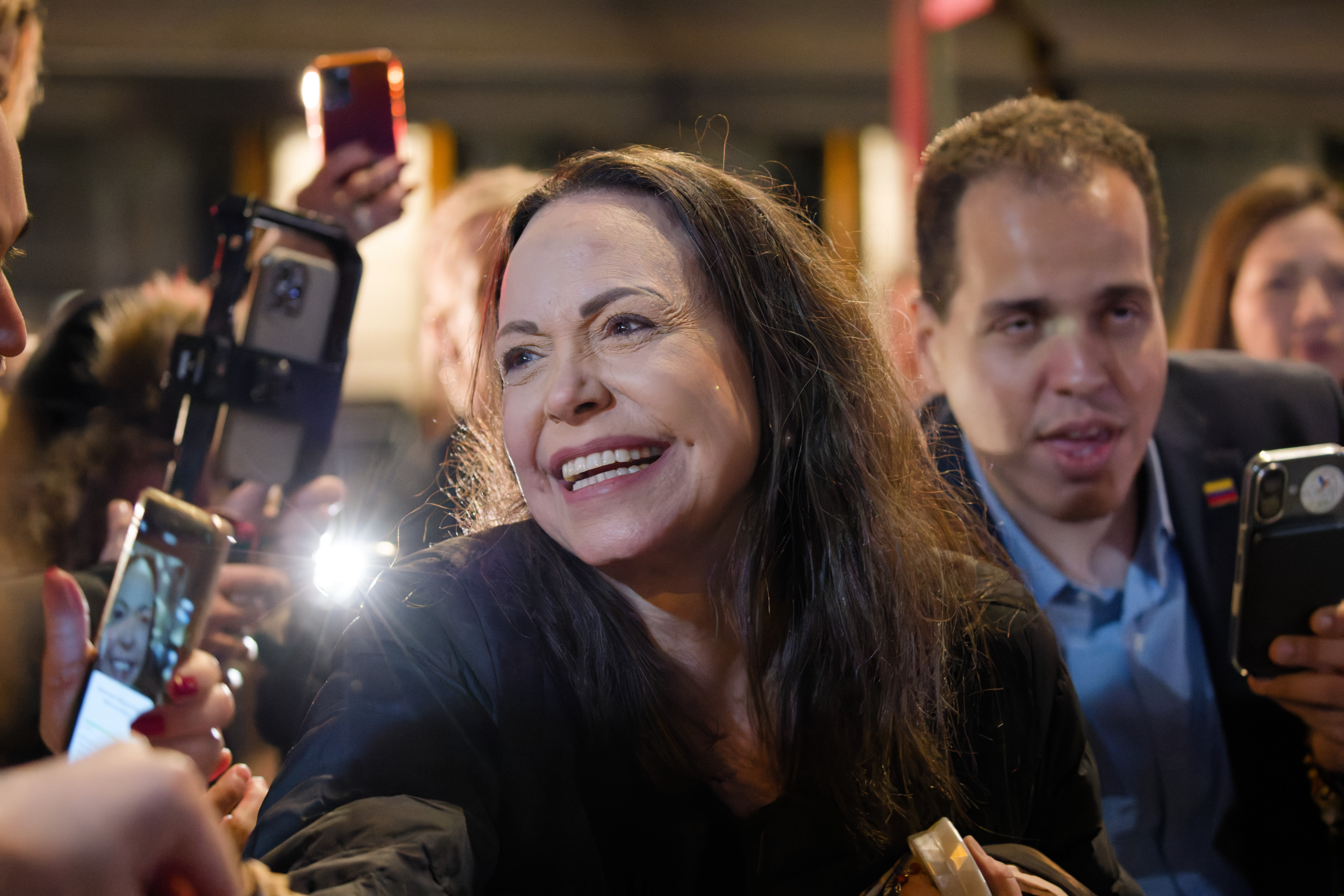
María Corina Machado arriving to Oslo after the 2025 Nobel Peace Prize award ceremony.

- Irene Sáez, Chacao mayor, Nueva Esparta governor and presidential candidate, as well as 1981 Miss Universe.
- María Corina Machado, National Assembly deputy and presidential candidate. She was awarded the 2025 Nobel Peace Prize.
- Mercedes Carvajal de Arocha, first woman elected to the Venezuelan Senate.

=== Science and math ===
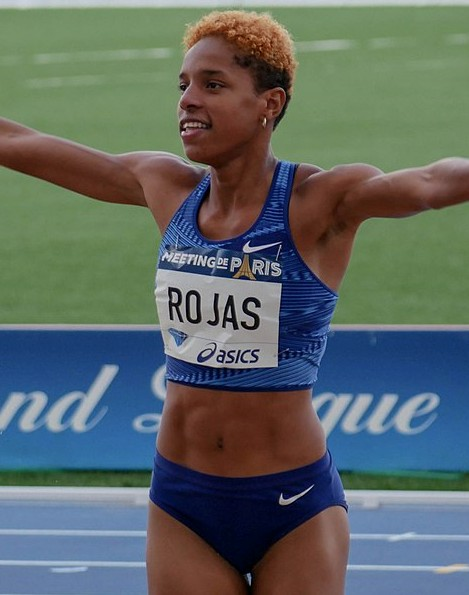
Yulimar Rojas, Venezuelan world record holder in women's triple jump.

- Zoraida Luces de Febres, botanist, university professor, and first woman to earn a bachelor's degree in natural sciences at the Central University of Venezuela (UCV) and first woman to earn a doctoral degree in biology in 1958.
- Anamaría Font, physics professor at UCV She was awarded the L'Oréal-UNESCO For Women in Science Awards in 2023 for he ground breaking work in superstring theory and for development of the S-duality.
- Alejandra Melfo, Uruguayan-Venezuelan physicist, known for her efforts of conservation of glaciers, specifically La Corona from Pico Humboldt, the last glacier in Venezuela.
- Kathy Vivas, astrophysicist recognized for her investigations of and finding up to 100 new and very distant RR Lyrae stars.

=== Sports ===
- Flor Isava Fonseca, journalist, sport woman and former vice president of the Venezuelan Red Cross. In 1981 Isava-Fonseca and Finnish Pirjo Häggman became the first women to be elected to the International Olympic Committee. She was the first woman to serve on the executive board in 1990.
- Deyna Castellanos, footballer, winner of two South American U-17 Championships and the 2018 NCAA Division I women's soccer tournament.
- Yulimar Rojas, athlete and first woman to win an Olympic gold medal in 2020 Summer Olympics. She is the holder of the world record for women's triple jump, at 15.74 m (51 ft 7 1/2 in).
