= Tambor (dance) =

Afro-Venezuelan music genre

Tambor is a secular and religious coastal Afro-Venezuelan music and dance. It is a cultural manifestation in South America originating in the slaves from Africa. The drums are of Kongo origin, as are most musical genres of Afro-Venezuelan origin. The Tambores are done with the playing of a cumaco which is a long cylinder-shaped drum played on the ground while the player (known as a cumaquero) sits on it and plays. It also consists of drums known as campanas which are played by sitting down in a chair and playing them with the hands.

These drums are often used for religious ceremonies. In the Birongo and Espiritista contexts, the drums are also used to celebrate the saints (syncretized with African spirits) to "come down" and induce Spirit possession among devotees, believed to be "mounted" or possessed by African spirits.

The main public ritual of the African diasporic religion, Santería, the toque de santo drumming ceremony, is also known as tambor.

== Groups ==
- Tambor Urbano
- Un Solo Pueblo
- Grupo Madera
