= Miguel de Buría =

First black king born in the Americas

Miguel I of Buría (Spanish: Miguel de Buría; c. 1510 – c. 1555), also known as King Miguel (Spanish: Rey Miguel), Miguel the Black (Spanish: El Negro Miguel) and Miguel Guacamaya, was a former slave from San Juan, Puerto Rico, who reigned as the king of Buría in the modern-day state of Lara, Venezuela. His incumbency began in 1552 and lasted until some point between 1553 and 1555. (Note: The exact dates are undocumented and ambiguous, Brito Figueroa and Esteves argued in favor of the year 1555 marking the end of his reign.)

He obtained his political influence and the control of the region adjacent to the Buría River after leading the first African rebellion in the country's history. This may have been because Buría had more slaves than other regions in Venezuela, of which most joined Miguel, and was still being contested between the Europeans and the natives, who also joined his side). During this insurrection he took over the Minas de San Felipe de Buría in modern-day Simón Planas Municipality, gold mines established within the area with the consent of the Spanish Crown to pull out the ore that was discovered in the river, a task that heavily depended on slave work. Miguel, who had a reputation as a rebellious slave, resisted an attempt to use a whiplash to discipline him and led several slaves in an escape. The group established themselves in a settlement built in the adjacent jungle, from where incursions were routinely carried into the mines. During these, Miguel would encourage other slaves to join him and seek freedom. In 1552, and accompanied by about 50 slaves, Miguel led an insurrection against foreman Diego Hernández de Serpa. Killing a Spaniard and sacking and burning some houses, the group took some weapons before fleeing towards the vicinity of the San Pedro river.

With his following rearranged to form an army, Miguel I established his royal lineage with his wife Guiomar as queen and their son as prince. His birth and upbringing in San Juan made him the first black king born in the Americas, also influencing him to use the European format for his kingdom. (Note: Several Amerindian cultures throughout the continent practiced varieties prior to the voyages of Christopher Columbus. Miguel's contemporary, Bayano, created a kingdom in modern-day Panama at some point between 1552 and 1556, but was born in Africa. At least 15 other cases of black kings, both native Africans and born in the Americas, were recorded between the 16th and 18th centuries. The Empire of Haiti was formed in the 19th century.) In his settlement, Miguel I also created his own church, (Note: A spinoff based on the Roman Catholic Church's tradition.) naming one of the former slaves bishop. Officers were assigned to the royal household. Other functionaries named included ministers and councilors of state. The Spanish expected more attacks in the region and fortified Nueva Segovia. Miguel led his forces in a clash against those led by Diego de Losada, but was killed in the ensuing battle. The fall of the king led to the dissolution of the political entity that he created, and the remaining survivors were captured and reintroduced to slavery.

== Early life ==
In 1517, Charles V authorized the capture and displacement of thousands of Africans into slavery to the Caribbean, due to a desire for free labor in the (mining and agrarian) Spanish settlements of the region. In the process, a limitation that only allowed Christians in the voyages to the New World was eliminated, allowing slavers to bring Africans directly from their countries of origin. Between 1530 and 1533, the progression of the colonization of Trinidad and Venezuela attracted local settlers to that area of South America (among them, Conquistador Antonio de Sedeño). In 1552, the settlement of Nueva Segovia de Barquisimeto was founded by, among others Damian and Pedro del Barrio. (Note: Nueva Segovia, was founded by Juan de Villegas due to the proximity of the mines.) The first had discovered abundant gold deposits at the Buría river, where mines under the service of the Spanish Crown were established under the name Real de Minas de San Felipe de Buria in honor of Philip the Apostle. In addition to local Jirajara natives, enslaved Africans were brought to extract the metal, among them was Miguel. He was a Christianized African, a class known as ladino (a term that also applied to natives), and knew the Spanish language. Miguel was displaced to Venezuela by Damián del Barrio. Eventually, he passed into enslavement by Pedro del Barrio, the latter's son. Miguel was forced to work in the Real de Minas de San Felipe de Buría in the state of Yaracuy. Pedro de Aguado noted that the African man was "proud" (others called him arrogant) and "well versed in cunningness". It was reportedly known among the Spaniards that Miguel had intentions of rebelling, at one point allegedly killing another enslaved African after revealing this secret.

Speculation about a noble ascendancy has been argued by some authors based on the organization of his kingdom, likely from the Portuguese slave raids in Angola or Mozambique. The arrival of royals as enslaved captives was recorded in other instances at Puerto Rico including the case of a prince that was captured by an opposing group and sold to traders, eventually being sent back to Africa following his transport to Manatí in 1832, where sugar baron José Ramon Fernández noticed that other Africans treated the young man (who was in his 20s) as their liege and discovered his lineage. Melchor López called him a "biáfra", indicating that ethnically his parents may have been part of a group that first originated between Nigeria and the Muni River (which is adjacent to the Bight of Biafra), before being brought to the New World. This, however, is not certain since the military proofs were taken ten years later and López served as a witness of Diego Hernández de Serpa in a document that featured several contradictions including naming the mines after a different Catholic saint, Saint Peter (calling them "Minas de San Pedro"). (Note: Furthermore, Hernández de Serpa, claimed that he pursued them on their way back to the Kingdom of Buría and led the extermination of the blacks and natives there, contrasting with the official accounts.)

== Kingdom of Buría ==
=== Rebellion at the San Felipe Mines ===
In a particular incident, one of the Spanish foremen that usually oversaw and abused the enslaved Africans tried to abuse Miguel by tying him (prior to lashing him). However, Miguel resisted and grabbed a sword from one of the foremen and defended himself with it. In the process, Miguel escaped to the nearby jungle. From there, he employed the cover of the night to stealthy approach the mines, where he began convincing the enslaved Africans and natives to flee and join his effort. He managed to gather around 20 within the first group and more of the second. Miguel then organized them, took control of weapons and led an attack against the mines. Emerging victorious, the rebels punished the Spaniards in the same fashion that they had been punished during their captivity, culminating in the executions of some (two according to author Pedro Simón) who were either foremen or had otherwise abused the enslaved men, women, and children. The survivors were left free in order to deliver a declaration of war to Barquisimeto, issuing an ominous warning that they "should wait with their weapons handy, since [the Africans] were determined to take away their town and resources and carry out deserved executions, taking their beloved women into their services". The news caused a commotion there.

In a testimony that took place in 1565, the conqueror Diego Hernández de Serpa placed the number of men and women that participated in the rebellion at 150, and stated that they were well armed and began the incursion gathering in a road, from where they attacked the small building where the Spanish were with so much vigour that they could not resist. After most were slaughtered, the Captain was joined by four Africans that decided to remain loyal, one of which was killed, while others joined him in the trip back to Nueva Segovia. Among the survivors was Melchior López, who claimed that he was threatened with death if he did not leave. Miguel and his men took all of the gold in the mines, as well as the equipment and belongings that the Spanish had at the location, as spoils of war. Miguel then arranged scouts to find and persuade other enslaved men and women and possible allies of joining their cause. Such efforts brought ladino natives to their company. Afterwards, in the document that served as proof of the military services that of Captain Diego Hernández de Serpa, the events were discussed in detail.

=== Coronation ===
Using his newly acquired riches, Miguel began an emancipatory campaign directed towards other enslaved Africans, as well as Christianized natives. This proved successful and many joined him, leading to a population of around 180 (several of them mine workers), among which was his partner Guiomar and the couple's son. Miguel's settlement was built in a strategic location, near an inlet or cove, with natural protection on the side that faced a river with an untraversable rock formation. It was fenced with two doors, and had guards at its entrance ready to defend in the case of an attack from the Spaniards. The exact location, however, is unclear. Sources place his kingdom in the proximity of the current city of Barquisimeto or the municipality of Nirgua in the state of Yaracuy. According to Edgar Esteves González, the ines were near Nirgua. Guevara speculated that he lived in a cumbe (a settlement of Africans who escaped slavery) located near the mountains. The population was said to number at least a hundred by the time of his coronation. Reports placed as many as 180 individuals during the settlement's peak. Herrera makes mention that the Africans had moved to a "land in a hard place" in his account about the attack on Nueva Segovia de Barquisimeto, but no other known document references this.

According to Spanish documents, a hierarchy was created and the women were assigned to the men, arbitrarily establishing the composition of the respective couples. Among the settlers was one that had been known as "el canónigo" (lit. "the priest", likely a shaman in the vein of African tradition) in the mines, a background that inspired Miguel to name him bishop of his kingdom. The cleric had a church erected, where daily masses were held. Given his origins at Puerto Rico and his dominance of the language, Miguel was quite familiarized with 15th-century Spanish society and its institutions. He organized his followers in accordance with these. In a ceremony, Miguel was sworn in as king by the bishop, Guiomar was recognized as queen and his son as prince, completing the succession line. The contingent of Africans was joined by the natives from the region in their recognition as king. He established a royal house and made use of every European regal role that he knew of. His most loyal collaborators were given the title of ministers, others were named royal officers.

=== War against the Spanish ===
War preparations followed the organization of the citizens, beginning with the manufacturing of spears and darts made from the metal of the mining equipment. These were added to the kingdom's arsenal, initially composed of swords that had been gathered during the siege at the mines and with bows/arrows brought by the natives that joined the cause. The Spanish soon received warnings of the war preparations, raising concerns among them and gathering support for a preemptive attack against Buría. The possibility of additional men and women fleeing captivity from other settlements, could in their own right join the kingdom. The Spanish settlement at El Tocuyo sent reinforcements to Nueva Segovia de Barquisimeto.

Learning of this, Miguel decided to instead take the initiative. The king ordered an attack on Nueva Segovia de Barquisimeto, reputedly pronouncing a war speech that emphasized liberty, arguing that despite "God [having] made [them] free, like the other people" the Spanish had made them slaves, criticizing the Iberians for applying different standards for slavery than several of the other European countries (this early in the history of the New World, countries like France, Germany or Italy mostly adopted war prisoners as slaves). The king reportedly used psychological warfare by having the natives painted using genipa americana (a plant locally known as jagua, which can be used to produce a dark substance widely used by natives throughout South America and the Caribbean), trying to project a larger number of black soldiers to intimidate the Spaniards by removing discernment. Weapons were assigned according to expertise, with the natives receiving bows and arrows and Africans receiving spears made from mining tools; assorted swords were also distributed.

The Burians arrived to the outskirts of the settlement during the night (Esteves places this attack taking place eighteen days after the uprising at the mines.), announcing their attack with the phrase ¡Viva el Rey Miguel! (lit. "Long live King Miguel!") and flanking the unsuspecting Spaniards. In the confusion, some of the Iberians identified the presence of the natives wearing black paint. The Burians won the plaza, burned the church and several houses, killing priest Toribio Ruiz and six settlers. The Spanish responded with the Tocuyan reinforcements, pushing them back before finally retreating to the mountains. Esteves credits Diego García de Paredes and Juan de Morón, both warned by Serpa, for the European response. Miguel reorganized his troops, but decided to return to his kingdom expecting the Europeans to counterattack.

The Spanish panicked throughout the region, knowing that the Burians had not received many losses and that further attacks were only a matter of time. Nueva Segovia de Barquisimeto requested further help from El Tocuyo, whose town council also feared that it could be attacked, organized its forces under captain Diego Losada. (Note: According to Esteves, governor Juan de Villegas was informed of the attack and ordered reinforcements from El Tocuyo to be sent under the orders of Diego de Losada and Diego Ortega.) The officer departed to the former town, where the group was reinforced and given the task of launching an attack against the Kingdom of Buría. (Note: According to Pedro Simón the imperial forces reached around 50. Individuals that had gained some local influence such as Pedro Rodríguez, Cabrera de Sosa and Diego García de Paredes were among them. So was a free black man, Diego de las Fuente.) The journey through the jungle was rough for the Europeans, who travelled it on foot. According to Juan Castellanos, Diego De la Fuente went ahead by himself and captured one of Miguel's men and brought him to Losada's encampment. The prisoner was the forced to serve as guide. Using the element of surprise, the Spaniards captured a group of women that had been laundering in the adjacent river side. The kingdom's guards, however, were alerted and reportedly made a call to arms with the phrase ¡Arma¡ ¡Arma¡ ¡Que los barbudos vienen! (lit. "To arms! To arms! The bearded ones are coming!")

=== Final battle ===
With this warning, the inhabitants of the kingdom armed themselves and after Miguel emerged to lead them into battle, they rallied behind him. They intended to prevent entry into the settlement, but after clashing with the Spanish, they retreated inside, but the doors were improperly closed allowing the Europeans to breach the interior. Cabrera de Sosa and Pedro Rodríguez were placed at the gates, while the Spaniards entered. Inside, Miguel addressed his subjects with a war speech in which he encouraged to fight for freedom. Afterwards, the king himself led his men into the clash, an act that led to Juan de Castellanos calling him "a reflection of the lion". During the battle, Miguel declined the offers to surrender that were made by the Spanish in defiant manner. The same author claims that one of his spears pierced a buckler carried by Pedro Rodríguez "from side to side". Oviedo de Baños noted that the Burians followed his example and complicated the battle for the Iberians. However, in the heat of the battle Miguel was fatally injured, having stayed in the frontline instead of falling back. It is not clear who was responsible for the death of the king, Aguado writes that he was stabbed by "one of the Spaniards", which Esteves names as Diego García de Paredes, but Castellanos claims that Diego de Escorcha fired a crossbow at him. Captain Diego Ortega gave the credit to Diego García de Paredes.

The king's men were immediately demoralized, with his death having a direct effect on the outcome of the battle when the Spanish noted and attacked with more eagerness. Castellanos claims that most of the Africans continued fighting, until they "died like Romans". According to Pedro Simón, several fled and were pursued and either killed or jailed. The remaining were captured and brought to Nueva Segovia de Barquisimeto by Diego de Losada. Herrera argued all black men were killed, leaving only women and natives behind. Aguado claims that the natives turned on the Africans after they lost. Guiomar and the prince, having stayed away from battle along the other women, were recaptured and enslaved. The Jirajara would continue to resist the Spanish on the Nirgua region for decades, eventually forcing the Spanish to abandon the mines and move the town of Nueva Segovia. News of the initial rebellion would not reach Santo Domingo until March 3, 1554.

== Legacy ==
=== Literature ===
His contemporary, Juan de Castellanos (who lived in Puerto Rico in 1539 and arrived in Venezuela in 1541), recorded the events involving Miguel in a requiem, Elegía a la muerte del gobernador Felipe de Uten, establishing his origins as a "brave negro, criollo (creole) from San Juan de Puerto Rico". His account, is more detailed than most in terms of naming the figures involved. Fray Pedro de Aguado, who arrived to Venezuela in 1561, met with several of the survivors of the Kingdom's time, recorded the rebellion. After being given the role of Chief Chronicler of the Indies, Antonio de Herrera y Tordesillas summarized the events. In 1956, Jesús M. Pérez Morales and Enrique Luch S. de Mons published Negro Miguel, el esclavo rey, which presents a fictionalized account of his life that give him the rank of Captain within sultan Suleiman I's military. Douglas Palmas' Uroboros (1976), a winner of El Nacional's yearly short story competition, makes direct reference to "avenging" Miguel among other figures that the author perceives as victims of oppression. In 1991, Alfadil Ediciones published Raúl Agudo Freites' eponymous Miguel de Buría, a historical novel that uses the king as inspiration for a fictional take on his reign. Miguel Arroyo's El Reino de Buría was published two years later.(Poddar et al. 573) Arturo Uslar Pietri based the story La negramenta on the events at Buría.

=== Folklore and arts ===
At Venezuela, where he is most commonly known as "El Negro Miguel", his actions became part of the popular culture and passed on through oral tradition. The figure of the fallen king has been deified, becoming part of the cult of María Lionza (which began in Yaracuy), as a member of the goddess' court where he is joined by other historic figures associated with rebellion like Simón Bolívar, the cacique Guaicaipuro and fellow enslaved African, Felipe. Some researchers have argued that the deity itself is a cultural representation of Queen Guiomar, due to the proximity of the cult's origin to the kingdom's historic location, but the hypothesis has not been confirmed. Ángel Sauce used the events as the basis of a ballet. Manuel Felipe Rugeles wrote poetry about it. By the 1960s, José Antonio de Armas Chitty was writing poetry about his exploits. This continued during the following decade. A dramatic adaptation of Miguel's life is part of Guillermo Meneses Espejos y Disfraces. Alejo Carpentier wrote poetry about Miguel and his defiance to build a kingdom in white territory in El siglo de las luces. The opera El Negro Miguel by Héctor Pellegatti suppose the imaginary construction of the freedom of the black slave in Venezuela. However, in his native Puerto Rico Miguel was virtually unknown until at least the late 1970s, remaining obscure even afterwards. Hilda De Luca was awarded an honorific mention at the 2009 Municipal Theatre Prize for her work La Cantata del Rey Miguel.

=== Critical analysis ===
In a reflection of the attitudes of their times, both Aguado and Herrera vilify Miguel's wish for freedom in their accounts. In Venezuela Speaks!: Voices from the Grassroots, author Carlos Martín established that the origin of the Network of Afro-Venezuelan Organizations can be traced back to "the first uprisings by Africans here, such as was carried out by Miguel de Buría in Yaracuy in 1552". In Contribución a la história de las culturas negras en Venezuela colonial, author José M. Ramos discusses Miguel de Buría as a literary influence. From a sociopolitical context, the Venezuelan government has also cited the rebellion in cultural magazines. The titular rebellion in La rebelión del Negro Miguel: y otros temas de Africanía served as the starting point of another similar book, this one published by the regional Fundación Buría.

In 1908, while discussing gold fever in Venezuela and dismissing most of the historical mines and reported deposits as fiction, author Jesús Muñoz Tébar called the events "the ridiculous story of the negro Miguel". Likewise, his contemporary Venezuela-based French historian Louis Alfred Silvano Pratlong Bonicell Gal (popularly known as "Hermano Nectario María") criticized Aguada's version and argued that Miguel's followers most likely surrendered after he fell, bringing in racial issues and what he calls an "inferiority complex". British scholar James Duncan expressed distaste for the black inhabitants and also criticized it as a "short-lived petty African monarchy" and compared it to Brazilian quilombo of Palmares.

== Succession line ==
Family of Miguel de Buría

2. Miguel de Buría
1. Príncipe*
3. Guiomar

* The name of the royal couple's son is not revealed in official documents. "Príncipe", which is Spanish for "prince", has become a misnomer.

== See also ==
- Afro-Puerto Rican
- Afro-Venezuelan
- Haitian Revolution
- Slave rebellion
- Zumbi
- Quilombo
