= Afro-Venezuelans =

Racial or ethnic group in Venezuela with African ancestry

Afrovenezolanos (Spanish)
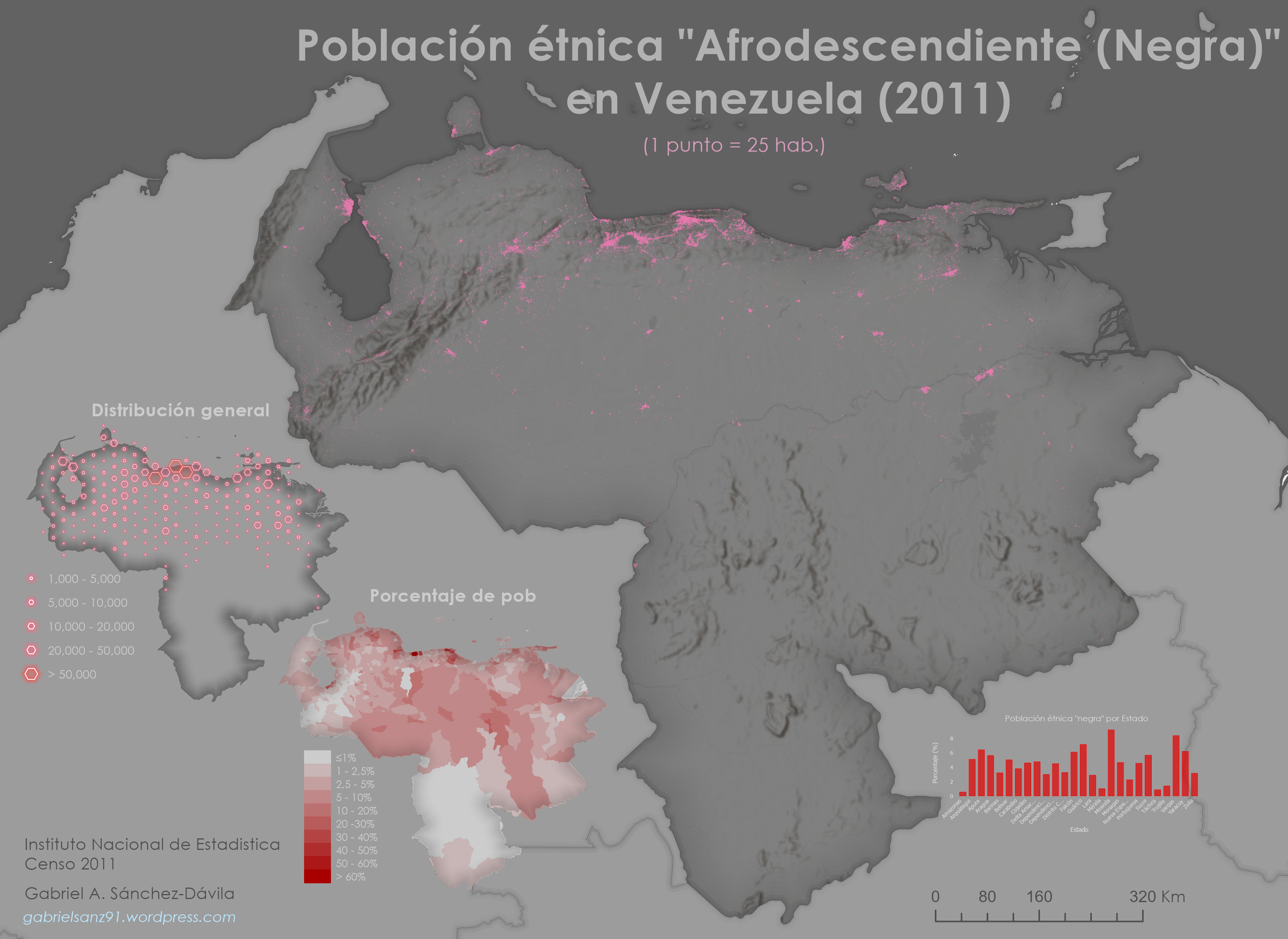
- Map showing the proportion of the Venezuelan population described as "Black" and "Afrodescendant" in the 2011 census.

Total population
- | population = Sub-Saharan ancestry predominates 1,087,427 (2011 census); 3.6% of Venezuelan population 15 million (2010 estimate); 17.1 million (55.0%; 2015 World Bank estimate) (Note: The World Bank's states Venezuelans classified as moreno have significant African descent.) up to 55.4% (CEPAL estimate including all people with significant African ancestry ) (Note: ECLAC notes that 52% of Venezuelans selected the census category morena/moreno; adding this group to those identifying as Black or Afro-descendant would yield 55.4%. ECLAC cautions that only part of the moreno population may be Afro-descendant.)

Regions with significant populations
- Highest percent found in the Venezuelan Caribbean and Barlovento. Small minorities live in the U.S., Spain, and Brazil.

Languages
- Predominantly Spanish

Religion
- Majority: Roman Catholicism; Minority: Protestantism · Birongo, Maria Lionza

Related ethnic groups
- African, Afro-Cuban, Afro-Guyanese, Afro-Colombians, Afro-Brazilians, African Americans, Afro–Trinidadians and Tobagonians and Venezuelan people

Afro-Venezuelans (Spanish: Afrovenezolanos), also known as Black Venezuelans (Spanish: Venezolanos negros), are Venezuelans who have predominantly or total Sub-Saharan African ancestry. Afro-Venezuelans are mostly descendants of enslaved Africans brought to the Western Hemisphere during the Atlantic slave trade. This term also sometimes refers to the combining of African and other cultural elements found in Venezuelan society such as the arts, traditions, music, religion, race, and language. According to Harvard University, Venezuela has the largest Afro descendant population in Latin America after Brazil.

== History ==
=== Slave trade ===
The first black Africans arrived on the Island of Cubagua around 1526–1527 to be used by Spaniards as slaves in pearl fishing. Slaves were later imported to the rest of Venezuelan territory for plantations and domestic service. Between 1576 and 1810, about 100,000 African slaves were transported across the Atlantic to Venezuela via the transatlantic slave trade. These slaves belonged to various ethnicities from present-day Angola, Senegal, Gambia, Benin, Nigeria and the Congo, such as: Kalabari, Igbo, Yoruba, Kongo, Wolof, and more. Slaves were treated as units of commerce, referred to as pieza de india which refers to their physique and potential for travel. Throughout the sixteenth century, slaves were brought to toil in the gold mines in Coro and Buría (Yaracuy) and to Isla Margarita and Cumaná for fishing and pearl diving. Small-scale agricultural plantations were also initiated in Venezuela, especially among the regions surrounding Caracas. In the 18th century, immense shipments of slaves were transported to Barlovento to aid the burgeoning cacao industry, indigo plantations in the Venezuelan Llanos and the sugar plantations in Lara, Aragua and Zulia, around Lake Maracaibo. Afro-descendant people made up 61% of the population of Venezuela during the 1800s.

==== Slave rebellions ====
The history of slave revolts in Venezuela, both in the form of runaway communities and mutiny, began quite early. The first documented insurrection was in Coro on 1532. However, the most momentous revolt of the time took place on the Buría mines on 1552. The rebellion was led by El Negro Miguel (also known as Rey Miguel), who founded a Maroons, cimarrón, or cumbe (escaped slave) settlement and had himself proclaimed king. He developed an army of 1,500 slaves, Blacks, Mulattos, Zambos and Indigenous peoples to attack colonial establishments.

There were a number of rebellions of enslaved people throughout the history of the colony. "Cumbe" derives from the Manding term for "out-of-the-way place". Typically located above river banks or in remote mountainous areas, cumbes were usually well hidden and housed an average of 120 residents. Such settlements were also called patucos and rochelos. Cimarrones were frequently aided by indigenous tribes living in the area (e.g., the Tomusa in Barlovento), and cumbe populations were composed not only of Blacks, but also of Indians and even of poor Whites. Cimarrón groups conducted raids on plantations, assisted in the escapes of other slaves, and participated in contraband trading. The only legally established town of free Blacks was that of Curiepe, established in Barlovento in 1721 under the leadership of Captain Juan del Rosario Blanco. The community was composed of former members of Caracas's Company of Free Blacks as well as huangos from the Antilles. The latter were escaped slaves who, like all Blacks fleeing non-Spanish-speaking islands, were granted freedom upon arrival in Venezuela if they accepted baptism.

Numbers of runaway-slave communities continued to increase throughout the seventeenth century, and by 1720 there were between 20,000 and 30,000 cimarrones in Venezuela, as opposed to the 60,000 slaves still working on the plantations (Rout 1976, 111112). Barlovento was the site of intense cimarrón activity throughout the eighteenth century, with several cumbe settlements being established around Caucagua and Curiepe. In 1732, there was an uprising of enslaved people led by Andresote against the monopoly of the Royal Guipuzcoan Company of Caracas had in Puerto Cabello and Capaye. In 1747, Miguel Luengo led a rebellion of enslaved people in Yare.

There were many cumbes in the interior of what later became Venezuela. The most famous of these was that of Ocoyta, founded around 1770 by the legendary Guillermo Rivas. Rivas ran away in 1768, and formed a cumbe which included runaways of African and Indian origin.

After he led raids on various plantations both to liberate slaves and to punish overseers, a special army was raised to destroy Ocoyta and execute Rivas. The cumbe of Ocoyta was eventually destroyed in 1771. A military expedition led by German de Aguilera destroyed the settlement, killing Guillermo, but only succeeded in capturing eight adults and two children. The rest of the runaways withdrew into the surrounding forests, where they remained at large.

One of Guillermo's deputies, Ubaldo the Englishman, whose christened name was Jose Eduardo de la Luz Perera, was initially born a slave in London, was sold to a ship captain, and took a number of trips before eventually being granted his freedom. He was one of a number of free black people who joined the community of Ocoyta. In 1772, he was captured by the Spanish authorities.

In 1794, there were uprisings in the Caucagua and Capaya districts. In 1795, an uprising led by Jose Leonardo Chirinos in the Sierras de Coro along with José Caridad González, In 1799, Lieutenant Francisco Javier Pirela led an uprising of the enslaved black militias.

=== Abolition of slavery ===
Afro-Venezuelans played a crucial role in the struggle for independence. Originally, slaves fought for the Crown, believing that the landowning creole Republicans were their enemies. In particular, the notorious royalist battalion of General José Tomás Boves attracted many slave soldiers. Bolívar, realizing the strategic importance of Black soldiers in the fight for independence, declared the abolition of slavery in 1812 and again in 1816, after promising Haitian president Alexandre Pétion that he would secure freedom for slaves in return for Haitian military aid. A major landowner himself, Bolívar freed 1,000 of his own slaves, and in 1819 recruited 5,000 slaves into his army. Many members of cumbes fought on the side of the rebels, and abandoned their villages.

José Antonio Paéz, a key figure in Venezuelan independence, led an army of Blacks from the llanos (plains). One of his most famous lieutenants, Pedro Camejo, has been immortalized in Venezuelan history as "El Negro Primero", because he was always the first to ride into battle. In the final battle of Carabobo, Camejo was mortally wounded but returned to General Paéz to utter one of the most famous statements in Venezuelan history: "General, vengo decirle, adiós, porque estoy muerto" (General, I have come to say goodbye, because I am dead). A statue of El Negro Primero stands in the Plaza Carabobo in Caracas. Curiously, he is sometimes depicted wearing a turban, the same iconography used for the mythical Negro Felipe. With the declaration of independence in 1810, all trafficking in slaves was outlawed. The decline in slavery continued throughout the War of Independence when, at its conclusion in the congress of Cucuta (1821), the "Ley de vientre" was passed, stating that all children born, whether of slave or free parents, were automatically free. By 24 March 1854, the date of slavery's official abolition in Venezuela, less than 24,000 slaves remained.

=== Aftermath of slavery and based discrimination of the 20th century ===
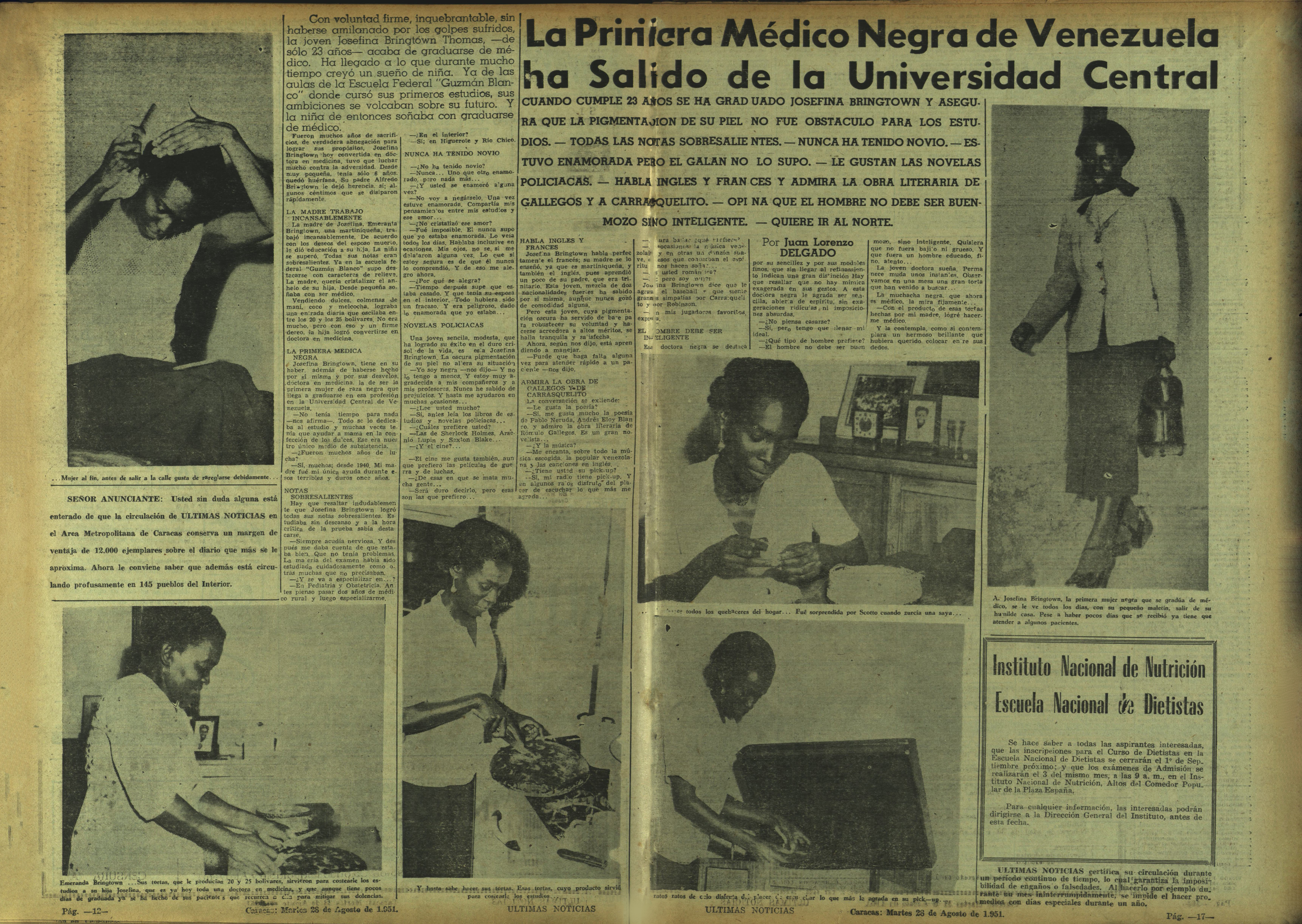
Josefina Bringtown, first afrowoman physician graduated in Venezuela.

Throughout the twentieth century, Blacks in Venezuela have faced subtle forms of racial discrimination despite a philosophy of racial democracy and an ideology of mestizaje that contends all groups have blended together to form a new, indistinguishable type, called the mestizo. Yet underlying this ideology is a policy of blanqueamiento, or "whitening", that has encouraged both the physical and cultural assimilation of Afro-Venezuelans into a Euro-dominated mainstream. An important semantic counterpart to the process of blanqueamiento is that found in the term negrear, which denotes concepts of "marginalization" or "trivialization". The emergence of Black intellectuals such as Juan Pablo Sojo and Manuel Rodrigues Cárdenas in the 1940s, and more recently of younger writers such as Jesús García, has helped counter the forces of blanqueamiento, or assimilation. A strong body of research in Afro-Venezuelan history and folklore has also been established by Venezuelan scholars, particularly Miguel Acosta Saignes (1967). Public festivals such as the Fiesta de San Juan have emerged as focal points in the reappropriation of Afro-Venezuelan culture, articulating current transformations in a living tradition of cimarronaje (resistance to the dominant culture, consciousness of being marginal).

== Cultural expression ==
=== Religion ===
Afro-Venezuelan religious practices have been adapted to Catholicism. Drumming and dancing, which figure in the celebrations of patron saints' days and other religious ceremonies, bear a close resemblance to various forms of African ancestor worship. Because the slave population was so heterogeneous, no African religious system dominated in this syncretization process although some have continued the Yoruba religion, as it did for example in Cuba, Brazil, and, to a lesser extent, in Trinidad as well. There has also been some intersection with indigenous cosmological systems. Figures such as duendes, familiaries, and encantados are types of spirit beings connected with the dead or forces of nature, which act as intermediaries between the parallel realms of physical existence and that of the spirit world. It is through contact with these beings, usually dwelling in deep riverine pools, that curanderos (healers) derive their power and divine the future. These beings are also responsible for the deaths and disappearance of various people. Such beliefs are articulated in the oral traditions not only of Afro-Venezuelans but of indigenous and mestizo peoples as well.

Some Afro-Venezuelans practice the African Diasporic religions of Birongo and Espiritismo. Espiritismo originated in the 14th century from Rural tribes of the Carib People of Yaracuy, in Central Venezuela. This religion has spread across Venezuela and even to Colombia, Brazil, Cuba, Dominican Republic, and Puerto Rico. It Revolves around an indigenous goddess originally called Yara, but when the Spanish came, she became Santa Maria de La Onza (Saint Mary of the Jaguar) She is said to reside in the Cerro María Lionza Natural Monument, also known as Mount Sorte, near Chivacoa, Yaracuy. The religion involves possessions, drumming, healing ceremonies, and others. Birongo is an Afro-Diasporic spiritual practice from Venezuela that originates from Kongo religion with influences from Vodun and Isese. The spiritual practice is mostly done by concentrated Afro-Venezuelan populations, especially those in Barlovento and Southern Lake Maracaibo. Practitioners heal patients using herbs and other paraphernalia and invoke saints through trance possession and the occasional animal sacrifice.

The influx of Cuban immigrants after the Cuban Revolution in 1959 has encouraged the establishment of the Afro-Cuban religion Santería among Venezuelans of all cultural and socioeconomic backgrounds. Although this is a predominantly urban phenomenon, African influences in Venezuela continue to evolve through a dynamic and continuous migration of cultural practices and forms.

==== Religious practitioners ====
Organized as they were around patron saints, Black cofradías were not simply social organizations, but also religious ones. Some cofradías were subdivided into separate "societies" that had distinct responsibilities. Sojo (1986) reports that in Barlovento, for example, each day of Holy Week had a separate society that was in charge of maintaining the holy images and ritual ceremonies associated with the respective day. In preparation, members would practice celibacy, abstain from consumption of alcohol, and perform various ablutions before "dressing" the saintly image.

Since colonial times, magico-religious societies have also existed, employing various forms of brujería, or "witchcraft". In Afro-Venezuelan communities, as in the rest of Venezuela, there is belief in brujos (sorcerers), who can cast spells and cause various forms of daño (harm). Fear of mal de ojo ("evil eye") against children is particularly common. Curanderas are sought for their knowledge of herbal medicines, which are used both in combatting illness and counteracting daño. In Barlovento, healers are sometimes called ensalmadores and are particularly respected for their ability to divine the future as well as to find lost objects and people.

=== Arts and ceremonies ===
Afro-Venezuelan ceremonies have been primarily linked to the Christian calendar, and many Afro-Venezuelan music, dance, and costume traditions are associated with specific church celebrations. The Nativity, Holy Week, Corpus Christi, the Cruz de Mayo, and patron saints' holidays are central to Afro-Venezuelan expressive culture throughout the country. The Día de los Inocentes (Feast of Fools, 28 December) is also celebrated and is particularly important in Barlovento, where "governments of women" are set up parodying male authority with absurd decrees and other actions such as cross-dressing. Carnival celebrations (the week before Lent) are significant, especially in eastern Venezuela, where in communities such as Carupano, Maturin, Güiria and El Callao there has been a large Caribbean influence. During saints' feast days, promesas (promises) made to the saints in return for personal favors are fulfilled. Correct observance of ritual activities such as offerings, drumming, dancing, and the feeding of all those present are essential to satisfying these promises.

In various regions of Venezuela, different religious holidays have emerged as important local celebrations. Around Lake Maracaibo, the fiesta of a Black saint San Benito (26 December to 2 January) is prominent and is celebrated with the playing of chimbánguele drums. In Cata, Chuao, Cuyagua, and Ocumare de la Costa (Aragua), Naiguatá (Distrito Federal), San Francisco de Yare (Miranda), and Canoabo and Patanemo (Carabobo), the Diablos Danzantes (organized into cofradías) are the centerpiece of the Corpus Christi celebrations, performing in particularly vivid costumes and masks that incorporate African imagery. In Barlovento, the Fiesta of San Juan Bautista (Saint John the Baptist) has been of singular importance since slavery. The three days of San Juan (23 to 25 June) were the only three days of the year during which slaves were given a rest from hard labor and were permitted to gather freely. During the holiday, not only would slaves celebrate with drumming and dancing, but also plot insurrection and flight.

The Parranda de San Pedro is a religious festivity of Saint Peter that is celebrated every June 29 in the cities of Guatire and Guarenas in Miranda State, Venezuela. It has its origin in slaves community of the Colonial Era. It consists of some revelers, dressed in tail coat and topper (one of them carries the image of the saint, another carries a yellow and red flag) accompanied by Cuatro and Maracas. The percussion is achieved with some pieces of leather tied to the feet as sandals (called quotes). They are also accompanied by two prepubescent children, dressed in a red and yellow costume (similar to harlequins), who are known as "tucusitos". The most striking character is a man dressed as a woman carrying a rag doll.

=== Music ===
Drums of many kinds are central to Afro-Venezuelan music. Most of them originated in Africa, and many closely resemble instruments used by Bantu-speaking and West African peoples. Each type of drum is typically played with particular rhythms that go with a particular song or dance, so the drum, its rhythm, and the musical style often share a single name. This combination of instrument, rhythm, and style is in turn usually tied to a specific festival or celebration.

In Barlovento, the most important drums include the culo e'puya and the paired mina and curbata. The region is also known for quitiplas, instruments made from hollow bamboo tubes that are struck against the ground, much like the "tambou bamboo" of Trinidad that preceded the steel drum. On the central coast the cumaco drum is common, played both at San Juan festivities and at secular drum dances (bailes de tambor), while Afro-Venezuelan communities further inland perform the tamunangue. In Zulia in the west, chimbángueles drums accompany the festival of San Benito, and the furruco, a friction drum, is a staple of Christmas celebrations and gaita singing. Trinidadian influence is evident in the eastern coastal regions and in Guayana, where steel-band (estilban) music is performed and calypso and soca are popular. Throughout Venezuela, drumming is commonly accompanied by maracas (rattles filled with seeds) and by the conch, another instrument of Indigenous origin.

Smaller percussion instruments, such as the charrasca (a small notched scraper), are also used to accompany the drums. Rarer instruments found in Barlovento and along the coast include the marimbola, a large bass lamellophone descended from the African kalimba; the carángano, a musical bow comparable to the Brazilian berimbau; and the marimba barloventeña, a large mouth bow. As elsewhere in Venezuela, the four-stringed cuatro is very widely played. Since the 1980s, bands devoted to Afro-Venezuelan music, such as Grupo Madera and Tambor Urbano, have brought these traditions to a national audience.

=== Folklore ===
Alongside music, dance, and costume, oral tradition is a key part of Afro-Venezuelan expressive culture. Among the most popular folktales are those in which Tío Conejo (Uncle Rabbit) outsmarts Tío Tigre (Uncle Tiger). During the 20th century a modest Afro-Venezuelan literature emerged, notably the writings of novelist and folklorist Juan Pablo Sojo and poet Manuel Rodríguez Cárdenas. Barlovento also has a long tradition of theater and dance, which has grown in prominence through companies such as the Centro de Creación Teatral de Barlovento-Curiepe, the Teatro Negro de Barlovento, and Madera.

== Afro-Venezuelans today ==
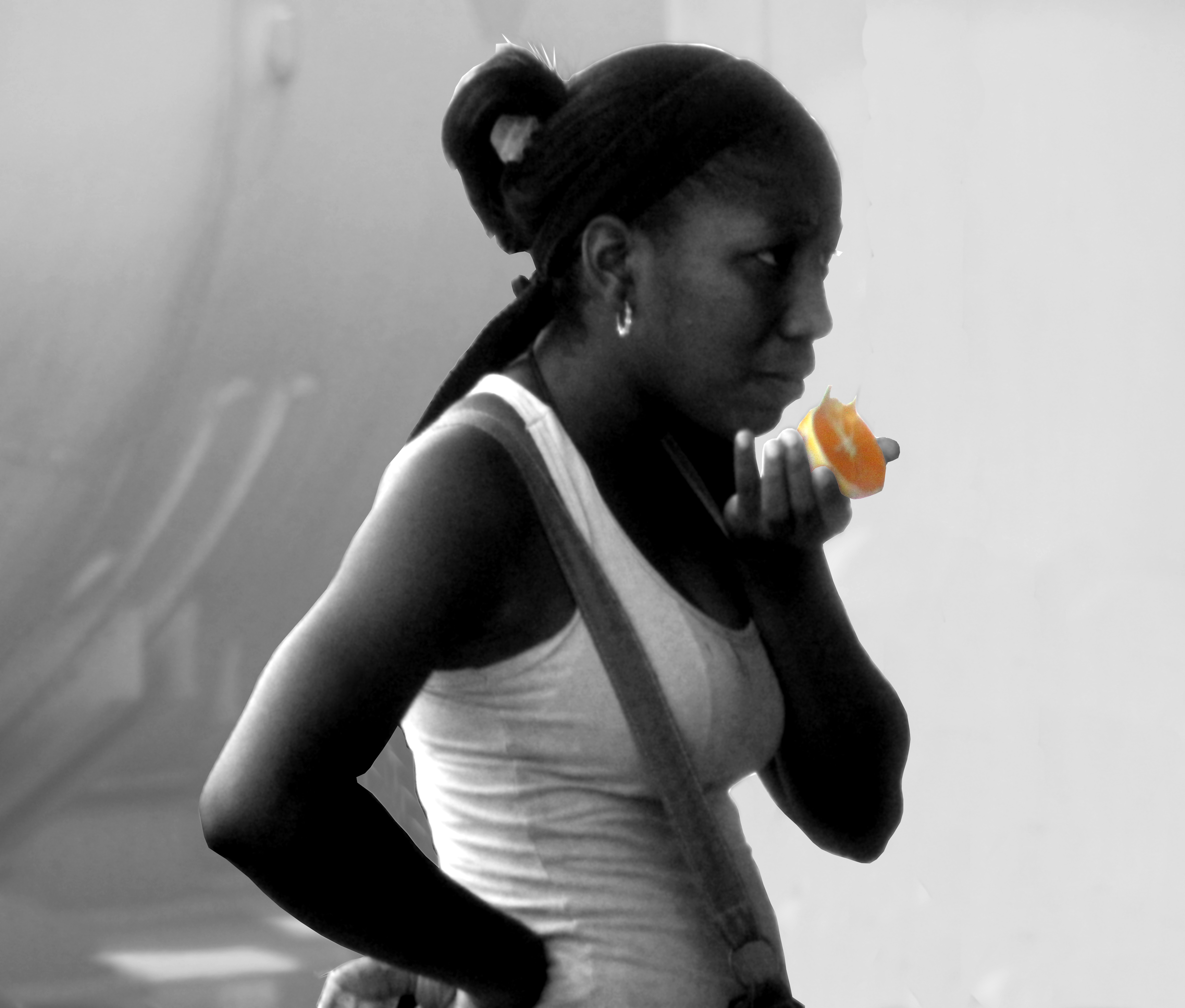
Dark-skinned Venezuelan woman in Miranda.

=== Identification ===
Spanish-language terms are used to refer to Afro-Venezuelans, and none of these labels come from African languages. The word "afro-venezolano" mostly functions as an adjective, as in the phrase folklore afro-venezolano. The broadest term in use is "negro", while "moreno" describes people with darker skin and "mulato" describes those with lighter skin, typically of combined African and European ancestry. In the colonial period, "pardo" referred to freed slaves or to people of mixed African and European descent, and "zambo" referred to people of mixed African and Indigenous descent. The term "criollo" still carries its colonial sense of someone born in Venezuela and does not signify race or ethnicity.

=== Location ===
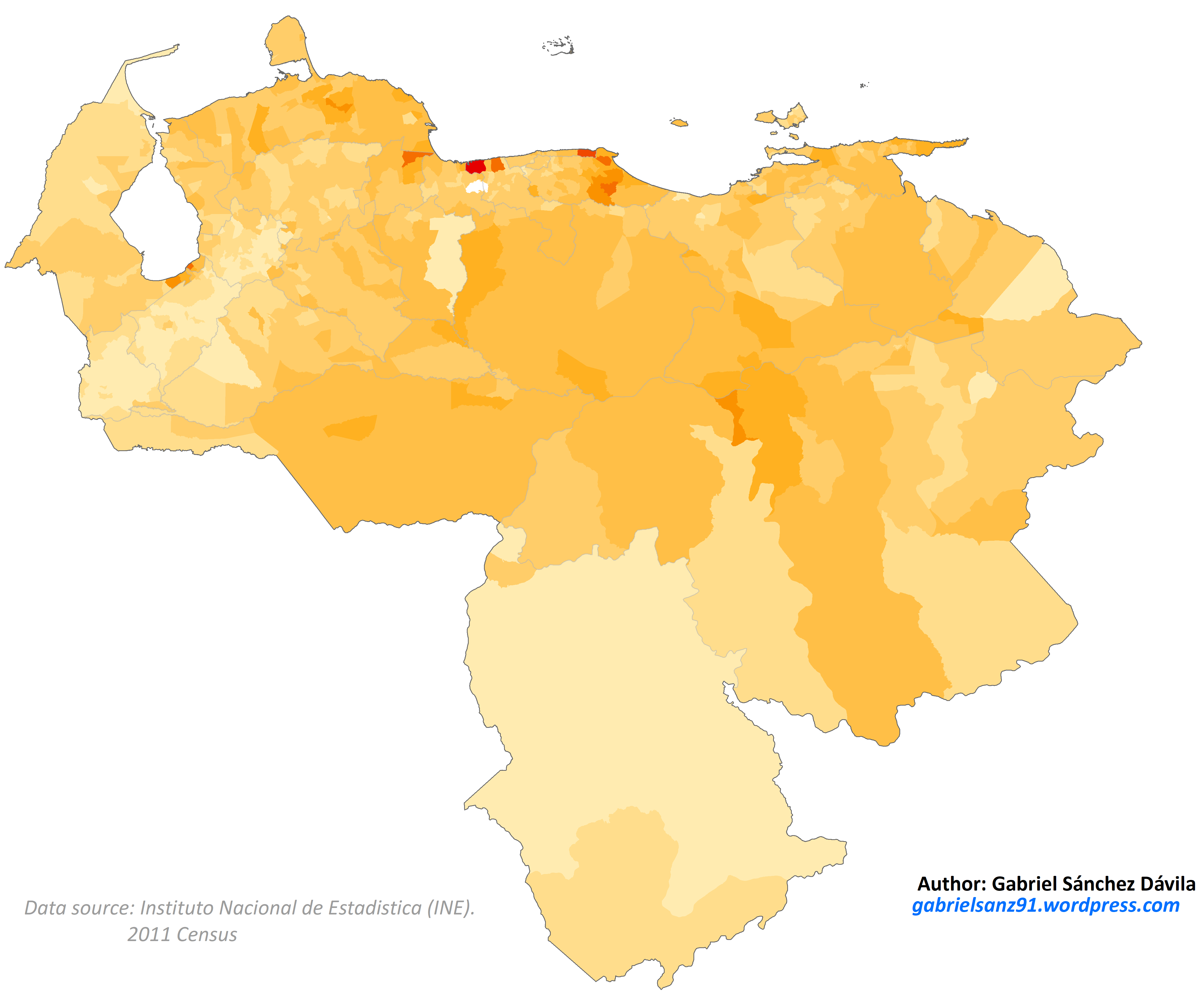
Geographic distribution of Black Venezuelans as of the 2011 census by municipality. < 1% 1–2.5% 2.5–5% 5–10% 10-20% 20-30% 30-40% 40-50% 50-60% > 60%

Although Afro-Venezuelans live throughout the country, their largest concentration is in the Barlovento region of Miranda, roughly 100 kilometers east of Caracas; the region spans about 4,500 square kilometers across four of the state's districts. Significant communities also exist along the coastlines of Carabobo (Canoabo, Patanemo, and Puerto Cabello), the former Distrito Federal (including Naiguatá, La Sabana, and Tarma), and Aragua (including Cata, Chuao, Cuyagua, and Ocumare de la Costa), as well as on the southeastern shore of Lake Maracaibo (including Bobures, Gibraltar, and Santa María). Smaller populations live in Sucre (Campoma and Güiria), southwestern Yaracuy (Farriar), and the Miranda highlands around Yare. El Callao, in the southern state of Bolívar, is home to another notable community, established by miners from the French and British Antilles who arrived in the mid-19th century.

=== Demography ===
In the 2011 census, 3.6% of Venezuelans self-identified as Afro-Venezuelan. Similar to Brazil, in Venezuela, people tend to be categorized by how they look: "moreno", "negro", "bachaco", etc. rather than by their actual ancestry. Encyclopædia Britannica estimates that at least one-tenth of Venezuelans (3 million) have relatively pure Sub-Saharan African ancestry. The Brilliant Maps calculates that Afro-descendants comprise 4% of the Venezuelan population. However, many Venezuelans are mixed with African ancestry.

== Notable Afro-Venezuelans ==
- Gregory Abbott - singer
- Bobby Abreu - professional baseball player
- Ronald Acuña Jr. – professional baseball player
- Jose Acevedo - track and field athlete
- Maria Teresa Acosta - actor
- Isidora Agnes - singer, founder of the Carnival of El Callao
- Aguilar - composer, singer
- Jesús Aguilar - professional baseball player
- Andresote - smuggler
- Elvis Andrus - professional baseball player
- Omailyn Alcalá - professional boxer
- Juan Arias - thoroughbred horse trainer
- Luis Arráez - professional baseball player
- Omar Atlas - wrestler
- Luinder Avila - professional baseball player
- Josh Barfield - professional baseball player
- Anriquelis Barrios - judoka
- Eduard Bello - professional football player
- Kenton St. Bernard - Calypso singer and bandleader
- Leopoldo Billings - percussionist
- Andrés Blanco - professional baseball player
- Damaso Blanco - professional baseball player
- Oswaldo Blanco - professional baseball player
- Hipolita Bolivar - foster maker of the liberator Simon Bolivar
- Matea Bolivar - notable slave who raised Simon Bolivar
- Leopoldo Bompart - professional basketball player
- Clive Bonas - track and field athlete
- Oswaldo Borges - professional volleyball player
- Mirtha Borges - actor
- Luis Gerardo Bucci – journalist TV host at CNN Sports
- Miguel de Buría - leader of black Slaves insurrection as King Miguel
- ChiChi Caldera- composer, singer
- Pedro Camejo - soldier who fought with the royal army
- Willie Cañate - professional baseball player
- Mariah Carey - singer
- Ezequiel Carrera - professional baseball player
- Cristian Cásseres - professional football player
- Cristian Cásseres Jr. - professional football player
- Deyna Castellanos - professional football player
- Edson Castillo - professional football player
- Alvis Cedeno - journalist
- Elio Chacón - professional baseball player
- Hugo Chavez – politician
- Endy Chavez - professional baseball player
- Jackson Chourio - professional baseball player
- Jesús Suárez Chourio - military officer
- Colina - singer
- Coquito - actor, TV presenter
- Sergio Córdova - professional football player
- Jesús Cova - professional boxer
- David Cubillán - professional basketball player
- Rogelio Cortez - jockey
- Luis Gonzalez Cova - professional football player
- Cruz Crescencio Mejías - mobster aka "Petroleo Crudo"
- Oscar D'León - musician and singer
- Yonathan Del Valle - professional football player
- Asnoldo Devonish - track and field athlete
- Maria de Lourdes Devonish - singer and TV presenter
- Pedro Duran - actor
- Kelvim Escobar - professional baseball player
- Lumumba Estaba - professional boxer
- Pedro Eustache - musician
- Wuilker Faríñez (Caracas) - professional football player
- Claudio Fermin - politician, sociologist
- Manuel Cristopher Figuera - militar
- Luis Beltran Prieto Figueroa - teacher and politician
- Hortensio Fucil - track and field athlete
- Pedro Gamarro - professional boxer
- Andres Galarraga - professional baseball player
- Lino Gallardo- composer, violinist
- Gabriela García - professional footballer
- Camaleon García - professional baseball player
- Cocaína García - professional baseball player
- Maikel García - professional baseball player
- Iván García - operatic bass singer
- Victor Garcia - profesional football player
- Marva Griffin - art curator
- Tomas Henriquez - actor
- Remigio Hermoso - professional baseball player
- Felix Hernandez - professional baseball player
- Arquimedes Herrera - track and field athlete
- Carl Herrera - professional basketball player
- Odubel Herrera - professional baseball player
- Yangel Herrera - professional football player
- Richard Hidalgo - professional baseball player
- Jan Carlos Hurtado - professional football player
- Gledys Ibarra - actor
- Carolina Indriago - Miss Venezuela 1998
- Francisco Infante - militar
- Omar Infante - professional baseball player
- Brigido Iriarte - track and field athlete
- Aristóbulo Istúriz - Venezuelan politician
- Porfi Jiménez - composer, trumpeter, band leader
- Argelia Laya - co-founder of MAS (Movimiento al Socialismo)
- José "Negro" Ledezma - dancer
- Sonny Leon - professional boxer
- Pedro Liendo - operatic bass singer
- Carlos London - Calypso singer and band leader
- Jose Celestino Lopez - professional baseball player
- Vidal López - professional baseball player
- Oscar Lucien - film maker and sociologist
- Martha Luna - fashion designer
- Wladimir Lozano - actor
- Betsayda Machado - singer
- Olga Teresa Machado - singer
- Darwin Machís - professional football player
- David MacIntosh - professional football player
- Christian Makoun - professional football player
- Víctor Maldonado - track and field athlete
- Esperanza Márquez - singer
- Rudy Márquez - singer
- Jose Cafe Martinez - professional baseball player
- Josef Martínez - professional football player
- David Martínez - professional football player
- Canelita Medina - singer
- Julio Mayora - weightlifter
- Carlos Suarez Mendoza - professional football player
- Keider Montero - professional baseball player
- Melvin Mora - professional baseball player
- Yolanda Moreno - folk dancer
- Antonia Muñoz - politician
- Morella Muñoz - musician, singer
- Ramón Muñoz - professional golfer
- Lloyd Murad - track and field athlete
- Jhon Murillo - professional football player
- Aida Navarro - lyric soprano
- Ciclón Negro - professional wrestler
- Diamante Negro - bullfighter
- Daniel Noriega - professional football player
- Hermanos O' Brian - composers, singers
- Pat O’Brien - composer, pianist
- Ivan Olivares - professional basketball player
- Carlos Orta- dancer
- Leocenis García Osorio - journalist
- Rómulo Otero - professional football player
- Francisco Pacheco - singer
- Robert Pérez - professional baseball player
- Salvador Pérez - professional baseball player
- Allan Phillips - music producer
- Eric Phillips - track and field athlete
- Heberto Castro Pimentel - journalist
- Esther Pineda G - sociologist and feminist writer
- Bernardo Piñango - professional boxer
- Victor Piñero - singer
- José Pirela - professional baseball player
- Carlos Quintana - professional baseball player
- Alberto Quintero - biologist, CEO of the IVIC
- Frank Quintero - composer, singer, guitarist
- Luis Reyes Reyes - militar, three times elected as governor of Lara State
- Juana Ramirez - independence activist
- Rodrigo Riera - composer, guitarist
- Gelmin Rivas - professional football player
- Daniuska Rodríguez - professional football player
- Dayana Rodríguez - professional football player
- Héctor Rodríguez Castro - politician, Minister of Education and Governor of Miranda State
- Manuel Rodrigues Cárdenas - author, writer
- Yulimar Rojas - track and field athlete
- Emilio Romero - track and field athlete
- José Encarnación Romero - track and field athlete
- Rafael Romero - track and field athlete
- Salomon Rondon - professional football player
- Juan José Rondón - militar
- Vicente Paul Rondón - professional boxer
- Edmundo Ros - musician, band leader
- Roberto Rosales - professional football player
- Ronda Rousey - retired professional wrestler
- Zulma Sady - actor
- Miguel Acosta Saignes - anthropologist
- Edith Salcedo - singer
- Magdalena Sánchez - singer
- Pablo Sandoval - professional baseball player
- Donta Smith - professional basketball player
- Sonya Sanoja- dancer
- Noel Sanvicente - professional football player
- Zoraya Sanz - actor
- Tomás Straka - writer, historian
- Les Straker - professional baseball player
- Victor Saume - TV host
- Marger Sealey - singer
- Simoney - singer, TV presenter
- Nelson Solórzano - professional basketball player
- Cleotilde Stapleton - singer
- Henry Stephens- composer, singer
- Ainett Stephens - television personality, model
- Hector Thomas - track and field athlete
- Óscar Torres - professional basketball player
- Edson Tortolero - professional football player
- Carlos Tovar Bracho - journalist, sport broadcaster
- Cesar Tovar - professional baseball player
- Juan Vicente Tovar - jockey
- Luis Gerardo Tovar - actor, poet
- Keydomar Vallenilla - weightlifter
- Gregory Vargas - professional basketball player
- Renny Vega - professional football player
- Jhonattan Vegas - professional golf player
- José Joaquín Veroes - militar
- Guillermo Vilchez - journalist
- Jictzad Viña - Miss Venezuela 2005
- Franklin Virgüez - actor
- Ysaura Viso - professional football player
- Vladimir Villegas - journalist, politician
- William Wuycke - track and field athlete
- Al Zeppy - composer, singer
