= Sucre Municipality, Zulia =

Municipality in Zulia, Venezuela

Sucre Municipality Municipio Sucre
- Municipality
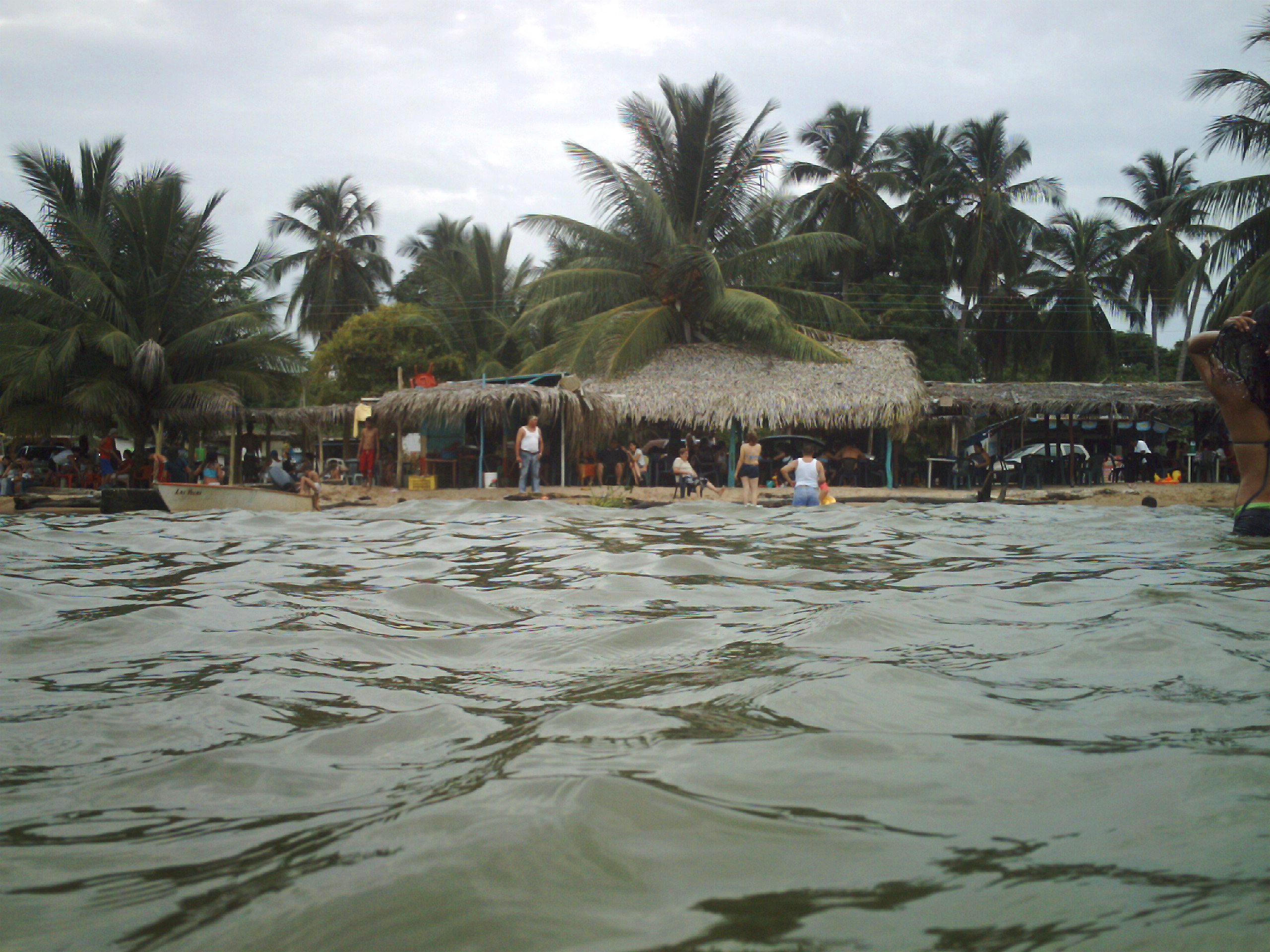

- Flag Seal

- Location in Zulia

- Location in Venezuela
- Country: Venezuela
- State: Zulia

Government
  - Mayor: Yonys González (UNT/MUD)

Area
  - Total: 1,442.1 km^{2} (556.8 sq mi)

Population (2023)
  - Total: 60,495
  - Density: 41.949/km^{2} (108.65/sq mi)
- Time zone: UTC−4 (VET)

The Sucre Municipality is located in Zulia, Venezuela. It was founded in 1989. The municipality has a total surface of 874 km^{2} and it has some 60,495 inhabitant (2023 census). Its capital is Bobures, in the south of Lake Maracaibo. The municipality is made of six civil parishes: Rómulo Gallegos (25,700 inhabitants), Bobures (8,012 inhabitants), Monseñor Arturo Celestino Álvarez (5,875 inhabitants), El Batey (8,744 inhabitants), Heras (5,539 inhabitants) and Gibraltar (5,539 inhabitants).

It is named in honor of the Venezuelan hero Antonio José de Sucre (1795–1830), the Grand Marshal of Ayacucho.
