= Marger Sealey =

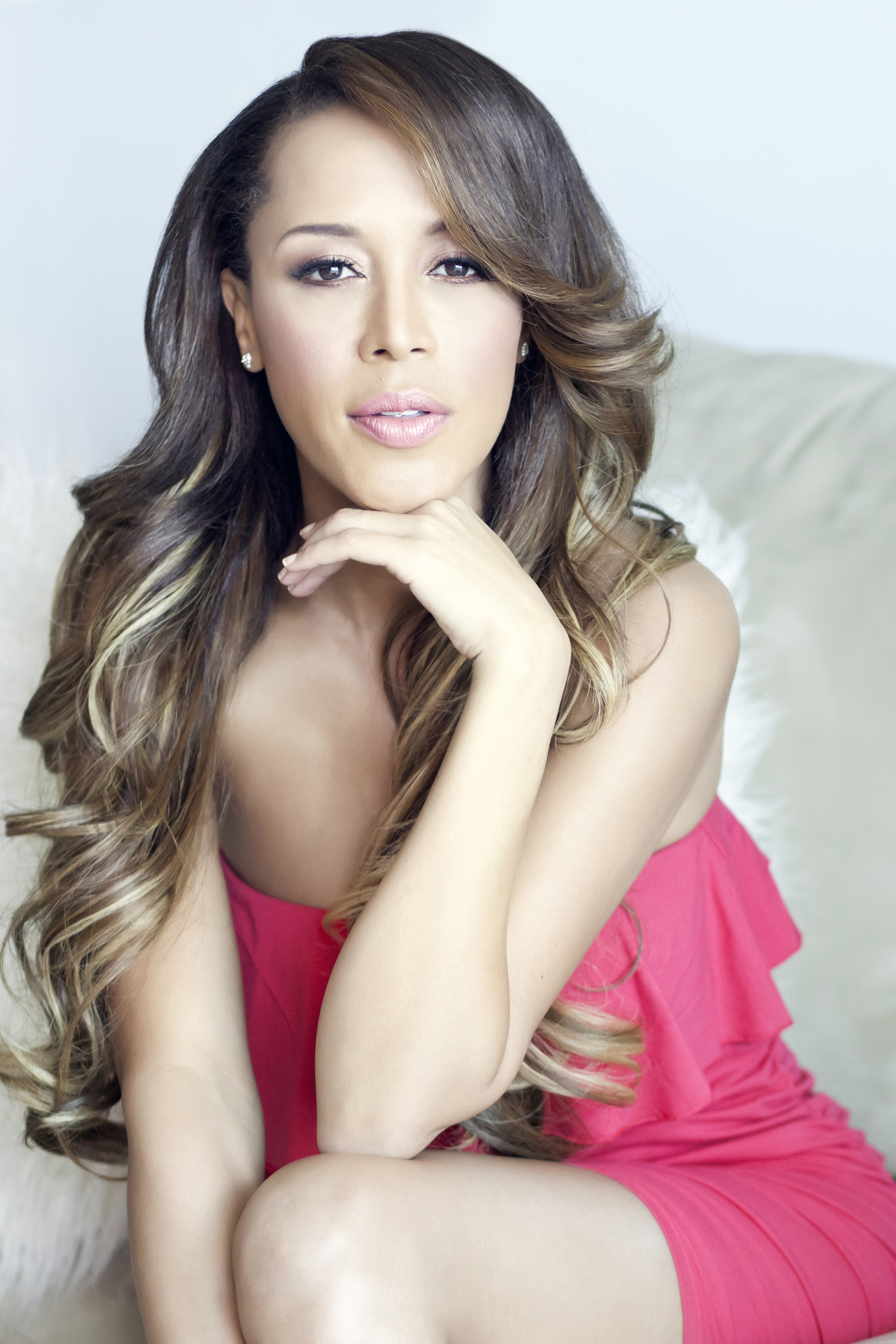
- Singer Marger Sealey, photographed in Miami

Background information
- Born: Marger Cecilia Sealey; Mérida, Venezuela
- Origin: Venezuelan
- Genres: Latin pop, dance-pop, pop
- Occupation: Singer-songwriter
- Instrument: Vocals
- Years active: 1999–present
- Label: Sony Music Latin (2018)

Marger Sealey (born November 22, 1971 in Mérida, Venezuela), also known as MG, is a Venezuelan singer, songwriter, and actress. Her mother is Venezuelan and her father is Trinidadian.

== Early life ==
She first appeared on stage at the age of 6 when she started singing with her grandmother -also a singer- and her grandfather, a jazz musician. She started recording her own songs in a studio at 14. She graduated from the University of the Andes as a dentist.

== Career ==
Marger lived in Argentina, where she performed in musicals with notorious Broadway and Argentinean Directors like Pepito Cibrian and Robert Jess Roth. She landed two Roles in "Little Shop of Horrors", and also she was part of a Tribute to the Best Musicals of Broadway where she interpreted "Chicago" and "Cabaret" to re-open Teatro Nacional. She was part of different television shows and soap operas, like the Argentina's show with Diva Susana Gimenez as a Susano and a special TV appearance in "El sodero de mi vida" starring Andrea del Boca and Daddy Brieva.

Sealey performed in the off-Broadway musical Fame as Carmen, the main character. The performance gained popularity for Sealey in Latin American countries such as Mexico, the Dominican Republic, Venezuela, Colombia and Argentina. She worked with Argentinian actress Susana Giménez and participated in the Miami-based reality TV program Protagonistas de la Música, where she became one of the audience's favorite contestants. Sealey recorded two albums with Protagonistas, one of which became a Gold Record. She went on to release the album Cómo te Digo, released in the United States and Puerto Rico.

After the show ended, Marger recorded and featured in other artist's projects: such as Ricardo Montaner, Olga Tañon and Tego Calderon, and a featured song with Buju Banton (Jamaica).

She also became a composer for other artist like Kiuldret, a Sony/BMG artist. Marger recorded a Latin Pop project with Colombian producer German Ortiz. She also has worked with producers like Iker Gastaminza (Shakira's Oral Fixation), Humberto "Humby" Viana (Daddy Yankee) and Juan Carlos Rodriguez, and Fernando Rojo.

Marger debut album "Cómo te digo" was released in April 2009. This album also bring an extra track: The love song of the soap opera hit “El Rostro de Analia” Tuya Otra vez, broadcast by Telemundo NBC.

In 2011 Marger obtain number one place in record report charts in Venezuela with her single "Como te atreves" from her first album "Cómo te Digo".

Sealey married with the Argentine stylist, Leo Rocco, in 2008.
