= Esther Pineda G =

Venezuelan feminist writer

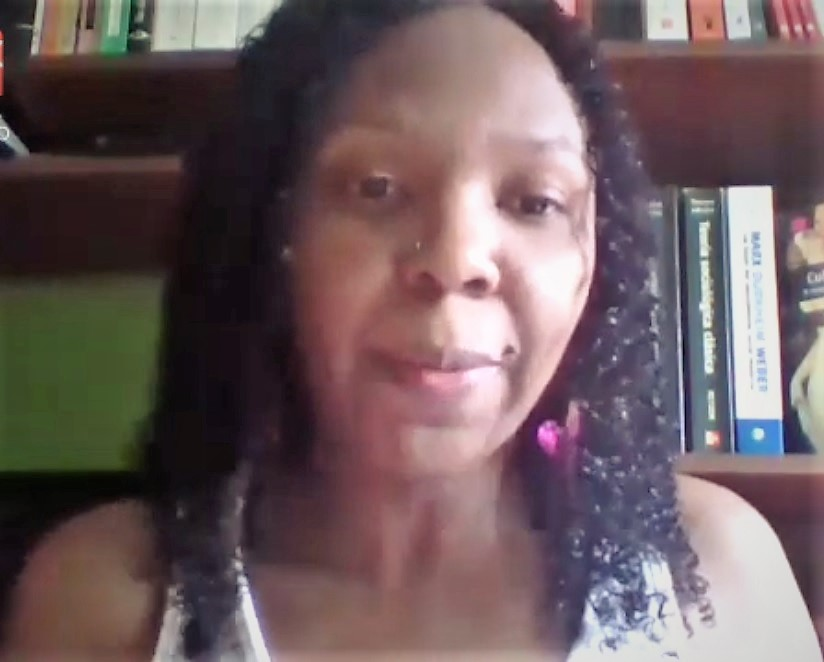
- Pineda in 2020
- Education: Central University of Venezuela
- Occupation: Writer
- Years active: 2011–

Esther Pineda G., often published as Esther Pineda, is a Venezuelan sociologist and feminist writer. She has written sociological studies, essay collections, and poetic anthologies about misogyny in the history of Western philosophy, the connection between machismo and violence against women, and racial discrimination, particularly against Afro-Venezuelans. Pineda holds a PhD in sociology, and her writing frequently uses tools of sociological analysis.

== Education ==
Pineda attended the Central University of Venezuela, graduating in 2010. She continued to study there as a graduate student, earning an MS degree in women's studies in 2013, and a doctorate in social sciences in 2015. She completed postdoctoral training there, also in social sciences, in 2017.

== Career ==
=== Professional positions ===
Pineda has been a regular columnist for outlets in several South American countries and Europe, including Uruguay's La Red 21 (es), Montenegro's Wall Street International, Spain's Iberoamérica Social (es), and Venezuela's Contrapunto (es).

=== Books ===
Pineda has also published several books. In 2011, she published Roles de género y sexismo en seis discursos sobre la familia nuclear, a collection of six anthropological discourses on the way that sexist models of behaviour are enforced in the context of the nuclear family. In 2014, she published Racismo, endorracismo y resistencia, a discussion of race and racism in Venezuela that was written with support by the Venezuelan Ministry of Culture. In Racismo, endorracismo y resistencia, she challenges the cliché that history, in the case of Venezuela, is written by the victors; rather, she argues that the writers of Venezuelan history perpetrated a genocide against both Indigenous peoples in Venezuela and Afro-Venezuelans, and that to be a victor implies that a legitimate fight was held on equal terms, whereas repression in Venezuela has not historically been a balanced fight. She also reflects on the cultural legacy of the white savior myth in Venezuelan culture and politics. A review of Racismo, endorracismo y resistencia in the outlet Aporrea drew connections between Pineda's argument and those of other contemporary Venezuelan writers, while arguing that the topics investigated in Racismo, endorracismo y resistencia remain under-discussed.

In 2017, Pineda published the book Machismo y vindicación: La mujer en el pensamiento sociofilosófico. In Machismo y vindicación, Pineda studies the role of misogyny in historical Western thought, arguing that discrimination against women is a central feature of Western philosophy. She traces women's role in Western thought through 19th and 20th century thinkers who rejected the claim that social differences between women and men are naturally guaranteed, and she connects these arguments to the contemporary phenomenon of machismo. Pineda describes the effects of machismo culture, citing data on violence against women to argue that macho violence constitutes a silent massacre of women.

In 2019, she published the book Cultura femicida.

=== Themes ===
In her work, Pineda has studied themes of machismo and misogyny in philosophy and sociology, gender stereotypes and roles within the family institution, violence against women, and sexism in the media such as in the popularity of beauty pageants and the portrayal of women in video games. She has popularized the concept through using the term violencia estética (aesthetic violence) to describe the damaging and discriminatory pressure on women to respond to prevailing ideas of beauty.

Pineda has also devoted a large part of her writing to the study of racial discrimination, especially racist discrimination against Afro-Venezuelans. She has written on topics like the hypersexualization of Black women, racism in daily life, and police brutality. She has also written extensively on the topic of endorracismo (endoracism), which is the perpetuation of racist tropes and behaviours by people who are themselves victims of racist discrimination.

== Selected works ==
- Roles de género y sexismo en seis discursos sobre la familia nuclear (2011)
- Racismo, endorracismo y resistencia (2014)
- Machismo y vindicación. La mujer en el pensamiento sociofilosófico (2017)
