= Martha Luna =

Venezuelan-born fashion designer

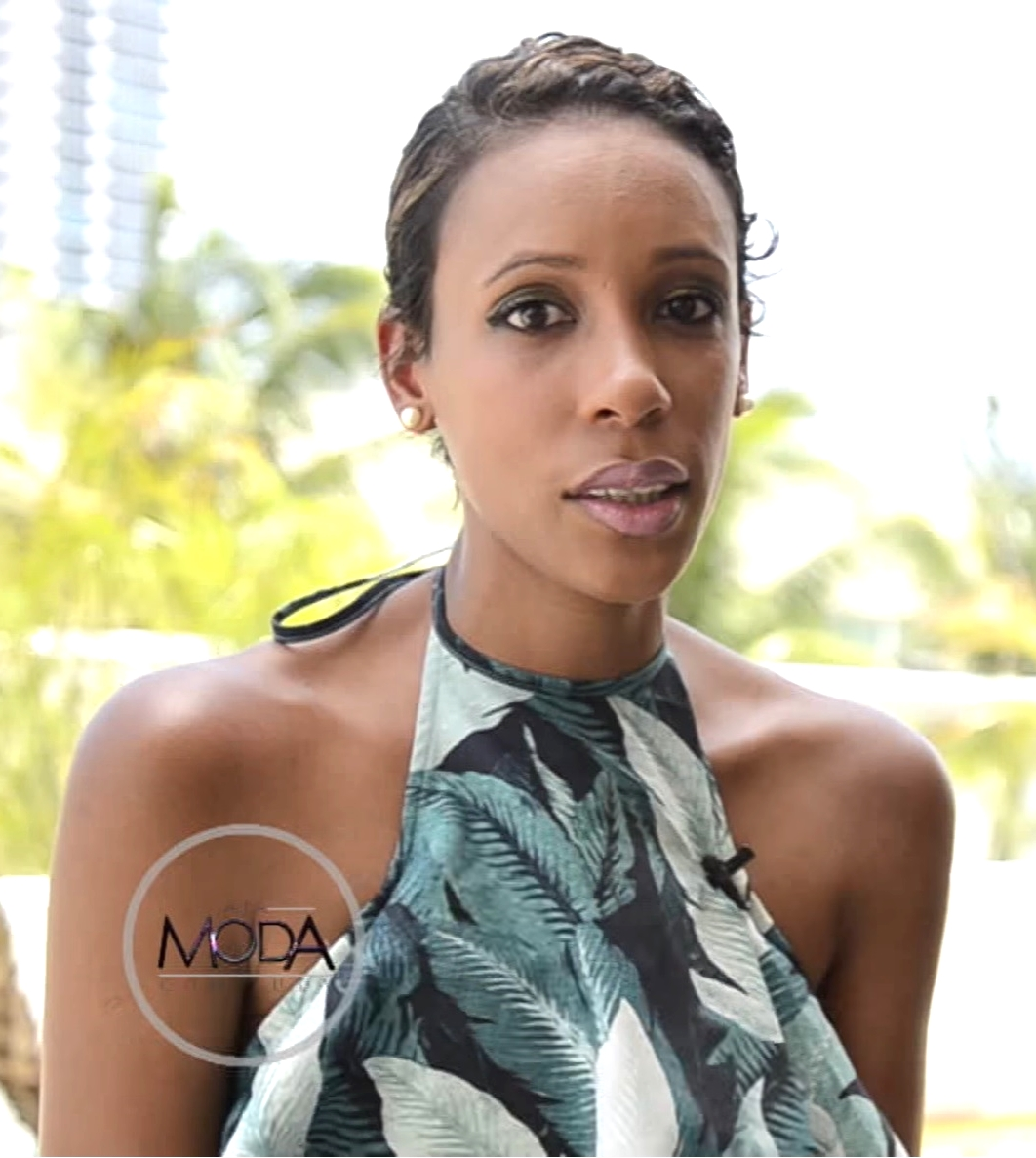
- Luna in Florida in 2015
- Born: Martha Luna Medina; Caracas, Venezuela
- Occupations: Fashion designer, stylist, television host
- Employer: MNYC

Martha Luna Medina is a Venezuelan fashion designer, stylist and television host. Her designs have been shown twice at the New York Fashion Week and she has hosted shows on Mira TV, Telemundo and DirecTV.

== Career in fashion ==
Luna was born in Caracas, Venezuela, and moved to the United States with her family as a child. Based in Newport News, Virginia, she started a fashion and style blog called MDOLLNYC in 2010. Two years later she moved to New York City and in 2015 she started her career as a fashion designer with the launch of a handbag collection called "Bilingual Collection", in collaboration with designer Astrid Carolina from Arena Fashion Venezuela and inspired by designs from her home country.

In 2016 she partnered with designer Gionna Nicole of the AvidSwim brand to debut a new collection, called "Resort Swim Caicos Collection" and presented on the runways of New York Fashion Week in February 2016. She then co-designed with Jackie Dew of Born+Made a collection of T-shirts and hats with Latin expressions.

In 2017 she created her own brand of cosmetics handbags called MNYC, with products manufactured in Venezuela. That same year she launched her makeup brand through the Swedish cosmetics company FACE Stockholm and was hired by the Food Network to dress American chef Tregaye Fraser in her appearances on various programs on the channel. In 2019 she designed the wardrobe worn by Puerto Rican reggaeton singer Brytiago at the New York Fashion Week. Brytiago thus became the first urban artist to walk the runways of the event held annually in New York. Since then, she has dressed celebrities such as Valeria Cid, Lyanno, Miriam Pabón and Dímelo Flow, among others, who have worn her designs at events such as the Latin Grammy Awards and the Lo Nuestro Awards.

== Other projects ==
In 2016, Luna began hosting a segment titled En estilo con Martha Luna, aired on Direct TV network. She has also recorded appearances in programs and specials on the Telemundo Internacional and Mira TV networks. After Hurricane Maria hit Puerto Rico in 2017, Luna founded with Samantha Murillo the volunteer mission Sisterhood of Faith, in order to help those affected in the country. In 2018 she was recognized at the Unlabelled Awards in the "Social Media" category for her work as CEO of the company MNYC.
