= Timoteo, "El Charro Negro" =

African-American mariachi

- Born: Timothy Pollard; Dallas, Texas, United States
- Origin: Long Beach, California, United States
- Genres: Mariachi; Son jalisciense; Tejano; Bolero; Ranchera; Corrido; Rock mexicano
- Occupations: Mariachi, musician, songwriter
- Instrument: Voice
- Works: Soundcloud discography of Timoteo, "El Charro Negro"
- Years active: 1995-present
- Website: Facebook page of Timoteo, "El Charro Negro"

Timothy Pollard (born in Dallas, Texas), more commonly known by his stage name Timoteo, "El Charro Negro", is a musician currently recognized as the first musically-published African-American mariachi of non-Mexican ancestry or nationality. His musical purview spans a number of Regional Mexican genres, including mariachi and Son jalisciense to ranchera, tejano, and bolero. Timoteo has performed with multiple notable Mexican regional musical artists, among them the likes of Vicente "El Rey" Fernández. He has also been a guest on numerous Spanish-language television shows, channels, and programming, including, but not limited to Sábado Gigante, Don Francisco Presenta, Univisión, Telemundo, EscandaloTV de Noche, American Latino TV, Latin Nation, Hoy Día, and Caso Cerrado. His most recent album release was in 2013.

== Background ==
Timothy Pollard was born to an African-American family in Dallas, Texas that, at the age of eight, relocated to a Mexican neighbourhood in Long Beach, California. Being the only Black family in his community at that time, Pollard's youth saw him exposed to many aspects of Mexican culture, notably 50s to 70s ranchera music, to which, despite his lack of knowledge in Spanish at the time, he found himself deeply pulled. Much later, at the age of 28, he began to learn Spanish through exposure to music and other media, but originally approached the idea of performing cautiously.

"When I decided that I wanted to be a mariachi, I didn't think it was fair to exploit the culture and not understand the language," he says. "If I'm going to sing, I need to be able to communicate with my audience and engage with them. I need to understand what I'm saying because it was about honor and respect." – Timoteo in an interview on 17 March 2021 with Natalie Vaval for the Latino media company Mitú

He was inspired to pursue singing after hearing the Vicente Fernández song "Lástima Que Seas Ajena", starting with gigs localized among his community. He was then noticed by the California radio host Big Boy and his station, whose co-hosts gave him his stage name: Timoteo, "el Charro Negro". (Spanish for "the black horseman".) In developing his career, he noted encountering many racial barriers, including producers who were, and/or remain unwilling, or unresponsive to the idea of platforming a Black performer of Mexican music. Nevertheless, as of 2025, he continues to perform Mexican music and promote Mexican culture, such as food through his Facebook page.

== Stylistic approach ==
Pollard's musical style seeks to invoke the artistry of the "Golden Age" of Mariachi during the mid-to-late 20th century, to which he was well-exposed in his youth. Additionally, his music often infuses or incorporates elements unique to his Afro-descendent background – a practice common throughout Latin America, and often elemental to many genres thereof, such as Son montuno and Salsa – genres of Afro-Cuban and Afro-Colombian conception. In Pollard's work, this has manifested through, for instance, the incorporation of some African percussion not necessarily common in Mexican regional music, such as the congas. Additionally, in both his English and Spanish works, he incorporates a number of musical elements characteristic of African-American popular music and R&B. In some cases this manifests in electronic additions to vocal style and artistic usage of autotune in his more experimental works.

== Guest appearance with Vicente Fernández ==
In 2007, during a California tour by singer and actor Vicente Fernández, Pollsrd was given the offer to perform with Fernández by one of his stagehands, which he found dubious. Nevertheless, the next day, he appeared at his 13 March 2007 performance at the Adventist Health Arena (formerly known as the Stockton Arena) in his signature blue velvet traje – the first ever performance to sell out the Stockton Arena – and was called up onto the stage to perform the song "De Que Manera Te Olvido" solo, with Fernández's insistence that Pollard use his microphone. After receiving a thunderous ovation, he made the decision to pursue publishing his first album, "Me Regalo Contigo."

== Health ==
Timoteo had been diagnosed with cancer sometime within the 2010s. In 2019 he announced his remission.

== See also ==
- el Charro Negro, a Modern Mexican mythical figure
  - La Leyenda del Charro Negro, a Mexican 2D-animated movie that invokes the legend
- Afro-Mexicans
- Blaxican
- Sombrero
- AfroLatinidad
