= Francisco Pacheco (singer) =

Venezuelan folk singer and drummer

Francisco Pacheco (born October 10, 1955, at Cata, Aragua State), is a Venezuelan folk singer and drummer who had a more than twenty-year career. He was a major parranda singer, and for much of his career he was a member of the group Un Solo Pueblo. His most popular songs with that group include "Botaste la Bola", "La Cultura Popular", "Quien ha visto negro como yo", "La matica, Viva Venezuela", "Margot, La Arigua". In 2001, he released the album Francisco Pacheco y su pueblo. He was also a member of the group Quitandinha Serenader. In 2013, he released the album Diversidad.
