= Birongo =

Afro-Venezuelan folk healing and spirituality

Birongo, also spelled Bilongo, is a spiritual tradition found among Afro-Venezuelans in rural areas of coastal Venezuela in South America, especially that of southern coastal Lake Maracaibo and in the subregion of Barlovento but with similar forms existing in Cuba and the Dominican Republic to describe magico-religious traditions and folk healing of African origins as they are done among Afro-Venezuelans.

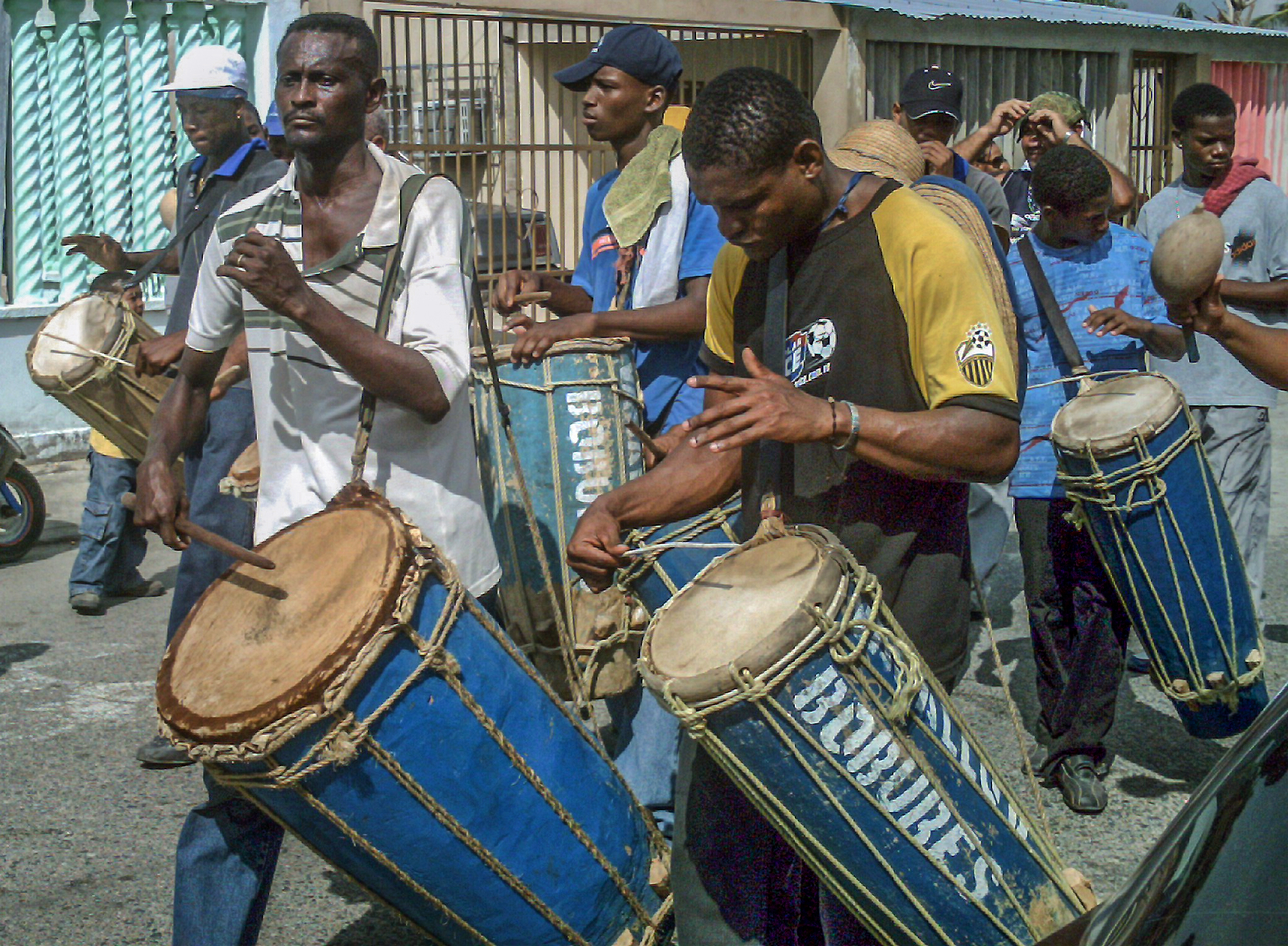
Chimbangueles are types of drums used to invoke and celebrate Saint Benedict, who is syncretized with the Vodun deity "Aje".

== Etymology ==
The term "birongo" comes from the Kikongo word "bilongo", which is used to describe ingredients of magical use but the term is used in Venezuela to describe folk medicine, and even witchcraft.

== Practices ==
Practitioners of Birongo, known as curanderos or ensalmaderos, use various herbs and ingredients to heal both spiritual and physical illness such as mal de ojo, and other forms using various herbs and preparations such as baths and teas to heal the victim. Alongside this, they use the psychological medicine of prayer and soothsaying to heal the patient as they call upon various saints who were syncretized with African deities. They often do divination with tobacco and will occasionally use it to report spiritual problems. The use of the humorism is often found as well, most likely from Spaniard influence.

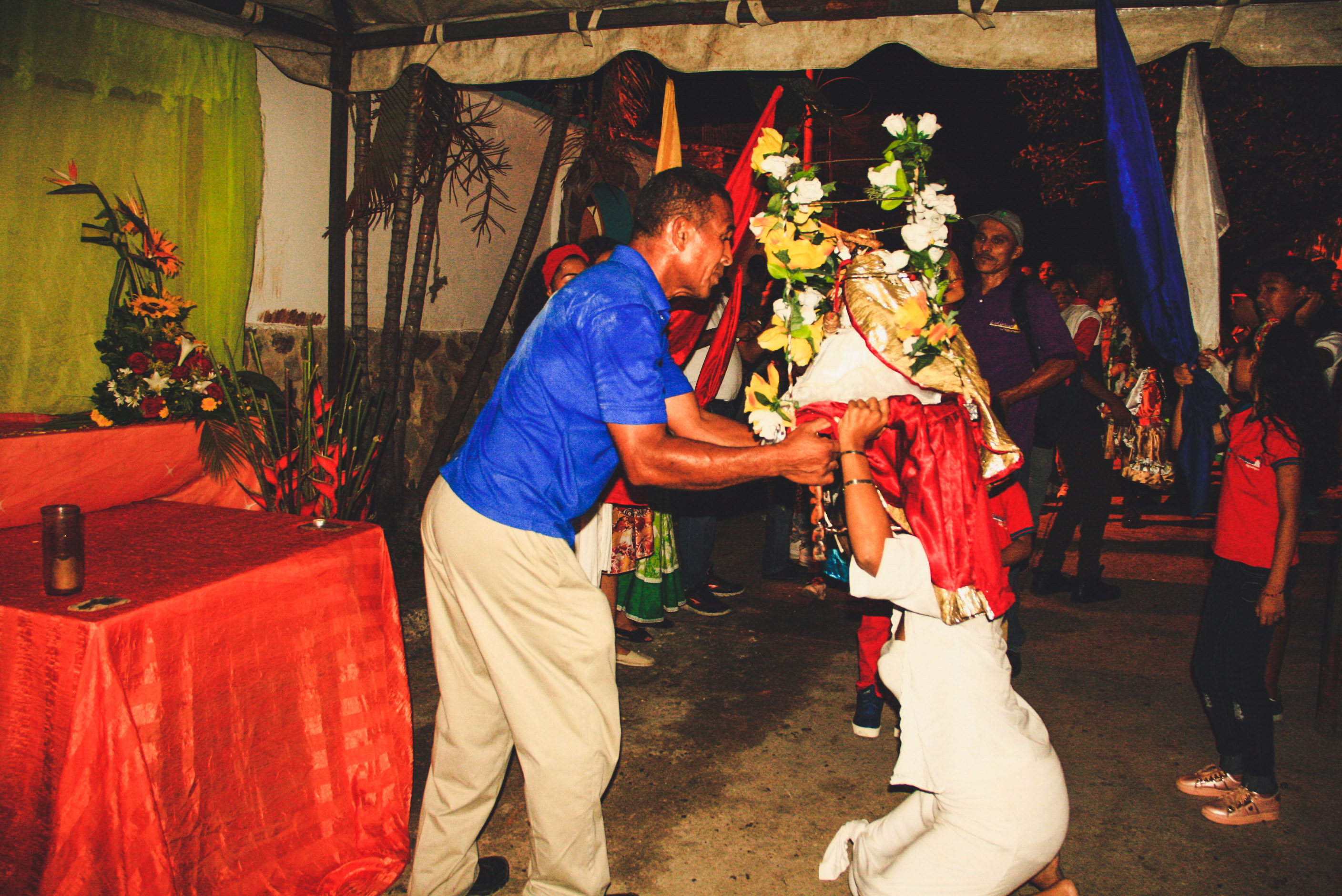
A devotee of Malembe carries a statue of Saint John on their head to put on the altar

Initiations may have taken place in Birongo. Malembe, who is syncretized with Saint John the Baptist in a folk form known as Saint John Congo, is often attributed to having a "shaved head", a ritual step in African Diaspora religions such as Santeria. Alongside this, the veneration of Maria Lionza has preserved many Afro-Venezuelan religious traditions and the initiation ritual reflect this. In Maria Lionza's cult, soon-to-be mediums head's are washed in an herbal-infused water (as is done in the religion of Santeria). They go through rituals known as velaciones where devotees lay down with symbols known as oraculos drawn with cornmeal or chalk around them. In contrast, herbal waters, offerings, perfumes, and blood from animal sacrifices are laid onto the person to connect them with the spirits.

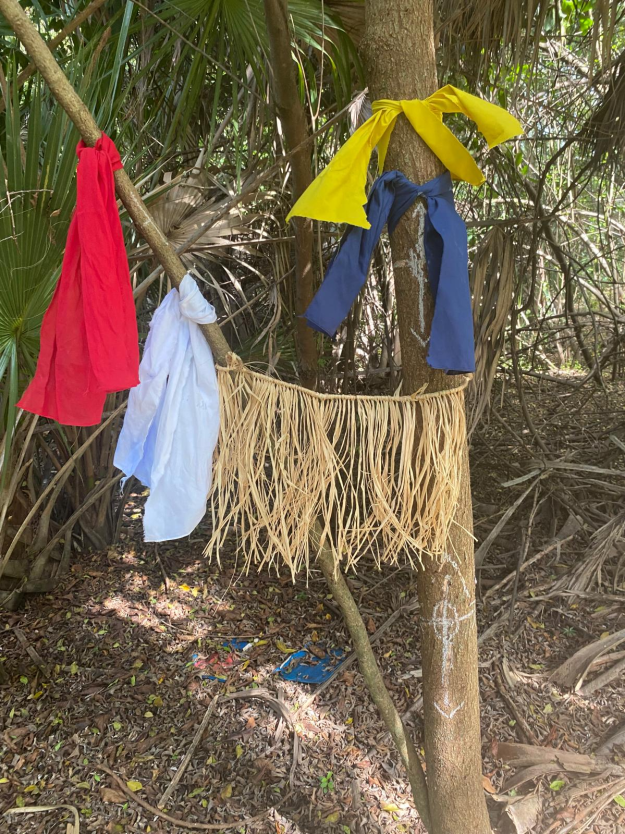
Trees are often considered sacred within the Birongo tradition, and different colored cloths to represent spirits are often tied on trees, along with symbols drawn on the bark known as "capillas" or "oraculos".

Alongside saints, ancestors have an important role in the practice of many Afro-Venezuelans, something which mirrors many other Kongo-based religious traditions such as Hoodoo and Palo Mayombe. Healers are believed to have direct connections with the dead and use tobacco divination or mediumship to be able to communicate with them.

Devotees often use liquor as a libation and offering to the spirits and saints in their rituals, along with tobacco smoke, and the occasional animal sacrifice along with drumming and singing to encourage the act of trance-possession which is common and often occurs during the most intense parts of drumming rituals and has its origins in African forms of worship and is characterized by screaming, dancing, and tingling sensations and can range from a simple trance state or trance-possession by the spirits of dead ancestors which can be caused by the consumption of tobacco and aguardiente. The usage of the word "Ganga" is recorded by Fernando Ortiz as a settlement, who explains the word means "freedom", although the word could also come from "nganga" which are spiritual cauldrons filled with sticks, bones, herbs, and ritual items like crosses that were used by Congo slaves across the Caribbean, yet nganga is a term which in Central Africa referred not to an object but to a man who oversaw religious rituals.

== Chimbanguele ==
The Chimbanguele tradition is a spiritual tradition of syncretic Ewe-Mina and Congo origin, with Catholic imagery and syncretism, but high amounts of Efik influence, similar to Haitian Vodou, found in the South of Lake Maracaibo and in the far Northern Maracaibo coast, revolved around Saint Benedict of Palermo, who was syncretized with the Dahomean deity of Agbe. The names of other deities also appear in his chants, such as Unsasi, Obi, and Kalunga-Ngombe and the chants are often done with some parts fully in African languages such as Kikongo, Yoruba, or Efik and the rest in Spanish, and occasionally Latin. Other saints like Saint Lucy, Saint Elizabeth, Saint Sebastian and Our Lady of the Rosary of Chiquinquirá are also widely venerated.

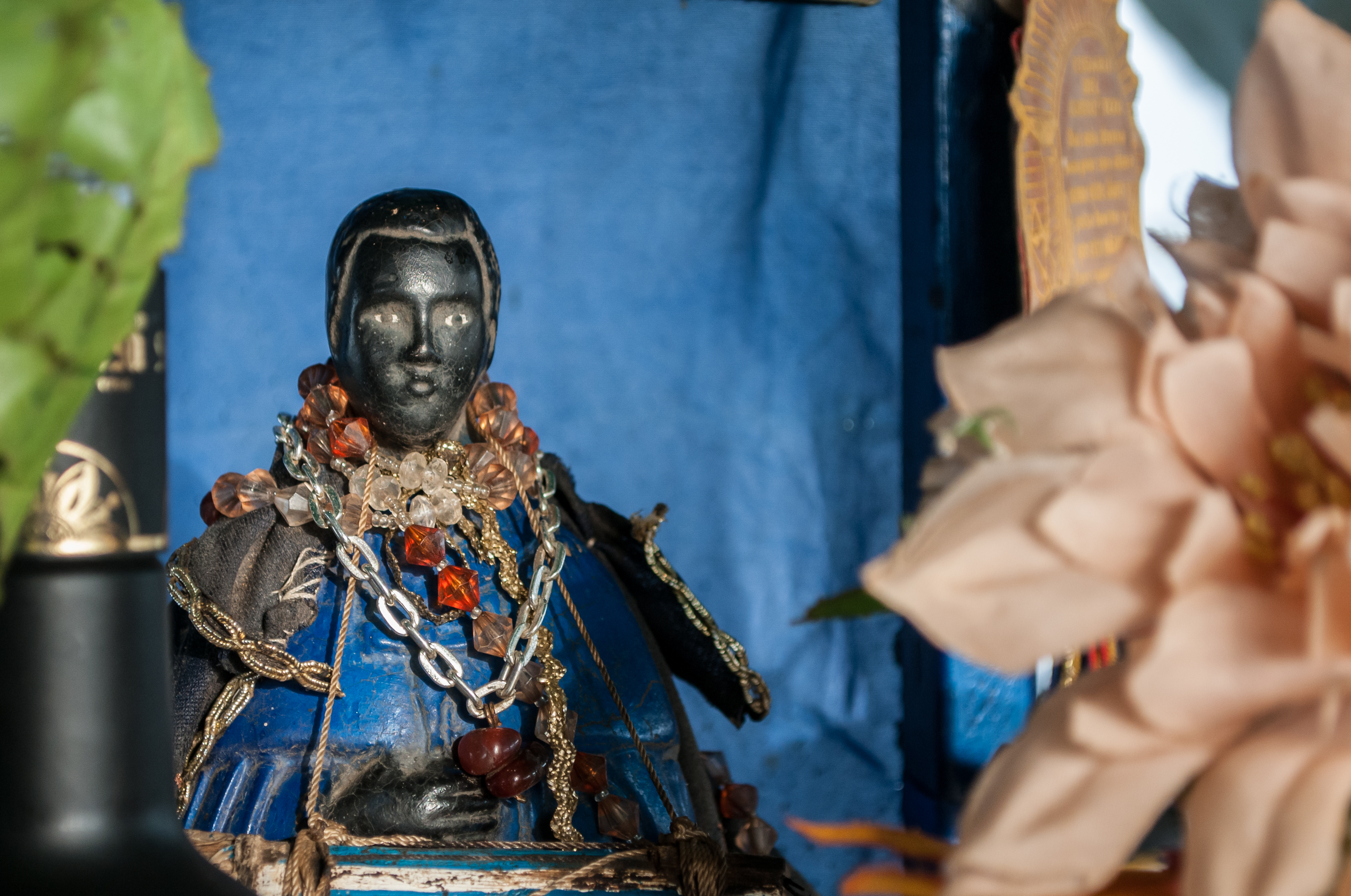
Main figure of the Chimbanguele tradition, Saint Benedict

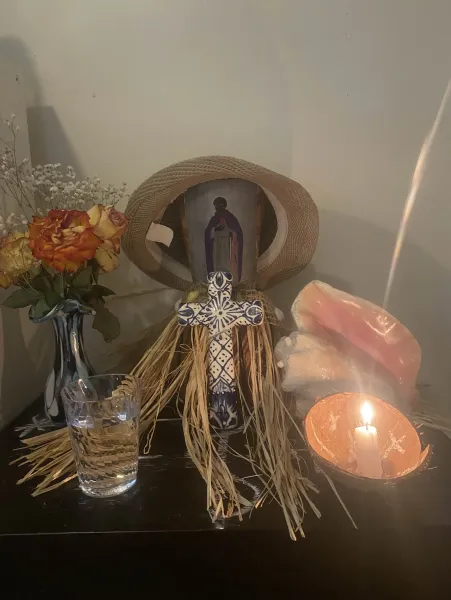
San Benito Altar of a Birongo practitioner

The spiritual hierarchy within the society, known as a cofradia, puts into place a role of the priest-like figure known as the Mayordomo who leads the ceremony and sets up the misa or ritual to begin the week long festivities, followed by a large hierarchy of leaders and elders, and at the bottom of the hierarchy within the Chimbanguele religious tradition has its origins in Efik societies, hence the sharing of various terms such as iton, bongo, echechere, mosongo, and even phrases such as "Bari Baribinga, Bari Barinque" at the beginning of the Chocho rhythm of drumming with the Abakua tradition of Cuba. The Chimbanguele drums themselves are also of Efik origins, but played using polyrhythmic Kongo styles. Another tradition extracted from Efik societies are the taraquero/barbua masked figures who represent the ancestors of the dead and punish those who do not properly do the rituals, similar to the ireme in Abakua, who often depict animals and enter ritual trance to invoke the ancestors.

The rooster is a sacred animal within this tradition, so powerfully present in rituals that it constitutes a very significant element. For example: "Christ said to Saint Peter, before the rooster crows, 'You will deny me three times.'" With its song, the rooster clears the midnight hour of the presence of evil spirits and paves the way for dawn, so that morning may awaken with its birdsong. The first Echechere drum, the sacred drum no longer used in present-day rituals, was decorated with four large bundles of chicken feathers.

== Central Venezuelan Birongo ==
Saint John the Baptist in his folk form as San Juan Congo, or Saint John of Congo who was syncretized with Malembe, a folk deity of Kongo origins who protects villagers and agriculture from evil forces who was historically represented as a nkisi with a phallus and most likely all deities of the Birongo tradition were portrayed as nkisis rather than with saint statues before the outlaw by the Catholic church, but many ensalmaderos may keep nkisis or nkisi-like objects of the saints or spirits they work with, even if not accepted by the Catholic church. The nkisi of the saint/deity itself is usually fed with animal blood, liquor, tobacco smoke, gunpowder, herbs (and herbal waters), and powdered bones to charge it with the energy of the saint. There are other saints also worshiped, such as Saint Peter, Saint Anthony of Padua, Saint Francis of Paola, and Maria Lionza.

== Saints of Birongo ==
Deity names and Saint Syncretization
Saint Syncretization	African Name	Etymology and Background	Reconstructed Attributes
Saint John Congo (a folk form of Saint John the Baptist)	Malembe	Through songs and folklore. Malembe is similar to the name for several deities in Palo Mayombe, "Munalembe" and to the deity of Candomble Bantu "Lemba".	Deity of agriculture and protection
Saint Benedict of Palermo	Aje	Through songs and folklore. Most likely from the Vodun deity "Agbe", who is found in Haitian Vodou as Agwe.	Deity of the ocean, the waters
Saint Benedict of Palermo	Unsasi	His name is invoked before starting the "Aje-Benito" rhythm of the Chimbanguele drums. Unsasi (Kikongo: Nzazi) is the Kongo god of thunder, and his presence in the rhythm is most likely due to the Catatumbo lightning storms	Saint of thunder, especially the Catatumbo lightning storms, fierce protector.
Saint Benedict of Palermo	Obilase	Invoked in the Chocho (from Yoruba: ṣóńṣó, a characteristic of Elegba) rhythm of the Chimbanguele drums. In Yoruba mythology, Elegba was first made of a coconut (in Yoruba: obi), so Obilase could be an epithet for Eshu, coming from Yoruba "obi láṣẹ" meaning "the coconut has authority, precedence".	Road opener, both kind and fierce
Saint Benedict of Palermo	San Gorongome	Name of one of the rhythms of the Chimbanguele drums (from Kikongo: Nzo ngolo ngombe, literally "Bull of the large home"). In Angolan mythology, Kalunga-Ngombe is revered as the protector of the waters which contain the ancestors.	Saint of the Kalunga Line, protector of the fallen ancestors
Saint Anthony of Padua	Nangue	Divinity whose name makes part of the name for the Tamunangue dance (from "ntamu nange", meaning powerful nange).	Deity of family, children, lineage, and war
Saint Anthony of Padua	Mbule	Mentioned in the folkloric song of "Sambarambule" (from Kikongo: sambila mbele, meaning "praise the knife") which is traditionally sung when someone has a snakebite. Across Afro-Venezuelan folklore, Saint Anthony seems to be equated to a warrior deity.	Deity of war who carries a machete and heals snake bites
God, Jesus	Gangue	Mentioned in the folkloric song "Macizon-Gangue" and other songs of Afro-Venezuelan origin. From Kikongo "ngangi", meaning Creator.	Creation, the world, highest deity
Saint Peter	No African name known	According to folklore, most likely a saint who was linked to healing and herbal medicine (such as in the case of the legend of Maria Ignacia who prayed to the saint for the healing of her daughter)	Saint of medicine, healing, and herbs
Maria Lionza	No African name known	Despite being of Indigenous or mixed Mestiza origins, her cult is very prominent among Afro-Venezuelan populations of the region of Yaracuy where she is seen as the protector of nature, the rivers, and the protector of the Mountain of Sorte. Her imagery draws resemblance to that of Mami Wata, especially with her connection to rivers and nature and the snake being a common symbol of her	Protector of the rivers, nature, fauna, and who resides in the mountain of Sorte.
Virgin of Bethlehem	Ocumare	Her cult is prominent in the Aragua and Miranda states, where two locations of Afro-Venezuelan descent are named after her: Ocumare de la Costa and Ocumare del Tuy. She has her origins in the Yoruba goddess Oshunmare, being syncretized with the Virgin Mary.	Snake deity of the rainbow.
Saint Francis of Paola	No African Name Known	His cult is prominent in Francisco de Yare, and is the patron of the diablos danzantes. The Dancing devils of Corpus Christi also exist in Mexico, where they venerate a figure known as Ruja, which is a Hispanizised form of Roox	Deity of rain and keeping evil spirits away
No saint equivalent	Echechere	The energy of the drums, it is the name given to the first consecrated Chimbanguele which has been lost to time. He takes the form of a Chimbanguele with 4 bundles of rooster feathers at the sides	Deity of the drums

== Sources ==
- Bettelheim, Judith (2001). "Palo Monte Mayombe and Its Influence on Cuban Contemporary Art". African Arts. 34 (2): 36–49, 94–96. doi:10.2307/3337912. JSTOR 3337912.
- Fernández Olmos, Margarite; Paravisini-Gebert, Lizabeth (2011). Creole Religions of the Caribbean: An Introduction from Vodou and Santería to Obeah and Espiritismo (second ed.). New York and London: New York University Press. ISBN 978-0-8147-6228-8.
- Kerestetzi, Katarina (2015). "Making a "Nganga", Begetting a God: Materiality and Belief in the Afro-Cuban Religion of Palo Monte". Ricerche di Storia Sociale e Religiosa. 44 (87): 145–173.

== See also ==
- Kongo religion
- Maria Lionza
- Nkisi
- Afro-Venezuelans
