= Diego Hernández de Serpa =

Spanish conquistador (c.1510–1570)

Diego Hernández de Serpa (Spanish: [ˈdjeɣo eɾˈnandeθ ðe ˈseɾpa]; c. 1510 – May 10, 1570) was a Spanish conquistador and explorer, who under the patronage of Philip II of Spain was part of the European conquest and colonization of the New Andalusia Province (Venezuela region) in northern South America.

== Biography ==
Diego Hernández de Serpa was born in Palos de la Frontera, Spain, around the year 1510. Since his youth, he had traveled to the Spanish Americas. He and his brother, Ginés Hernández de Serpa, went in 1524 to the small island of Cubagua, off the coast of present-day Venezuela. The island was thriving from the pearl industry. The two brothers prospered there.

Hernández accompanied Diego de Ordás in the Spanish expedition up the Orinoco River in 1530, searching for fabled El Dorado.

Until 1537, during his return to Cubagua, Hernández was responsible for defending against pirates and for seven years he traveled the Caribbean in pursuit of corsairs. In 1537, the crisis intensified in New Cadiz, and there was a discovery of oyster beds in the Cabo de La Vela, where the majority of colonists in Cubagua were sent.

Around 1539, he went to Quito, where he lived some eight years with his family. His travels took him to Santa Marta, and then in 1564 to Cartagena, both in Colombia. He then went to Panama, and back to Spain for two years.

In Spain, in 1550, Hernández married Constanza Alonzo. They had a son, Garcí, who was born around 1545 in Palos de la Frontera, and a daughter, Leonor, born in 1551.

During his constant travels, he established a friendship with Juan Caballero, son and heir of don Diego Caballero, one of the wealthiest men in the Antilles and of the new colony of Paria. This relationship gave Diego notable political and economic influence. Hernández had spent forty-eight years in the Americas and demanded as a reward for his services to the Spanish crown that he be appointed governor of Paria and Cumaná.

He negotiated with the Royal Audiencia of Santo Domingo over a new enterprise, the conquering of Guayana in northern South America. Negotiations began in 1544, and it was eventually authorized in 1549. He was granted troops and named captain of the Conquest of Guayana. There was a quick suspension, due to lack of royal authorization and opposition from the colonial governor of Isla Margarita in the Caribbean Sea. Finally he was able to pass Isla Margarita and was named Mayor and Captain of the War of Maracapana (Tierra Firme). He then took up the expedition towards El Tocuyo on the Tocuyo River. After a long march of six months he arrived at his destination in the middle of 1552. He participated in the founding of Nueva Segovia de Barquisimeto, present day Barquisimeto, in 1552 on the Turbio River.

Diego Hernández de Serpa died on May 10, 1570.

== See also ==
- Colonial Venezuela-related articles
