= San Timoteo =

San Timoteo is Spanish and Italian for Saint Timothy. It may refer to:

- San Timoteo, Rome, church in Rome, Italy
- San Timoteo Badlands, California
- San Timoteo Canyon, California
- San Timoteo Creek, California
- San Timoteo Formation, geologic formation in California
- San Timoteo, Venezuela, city in Zulia state, Venezuela
