= Che Guevara in popular culture =

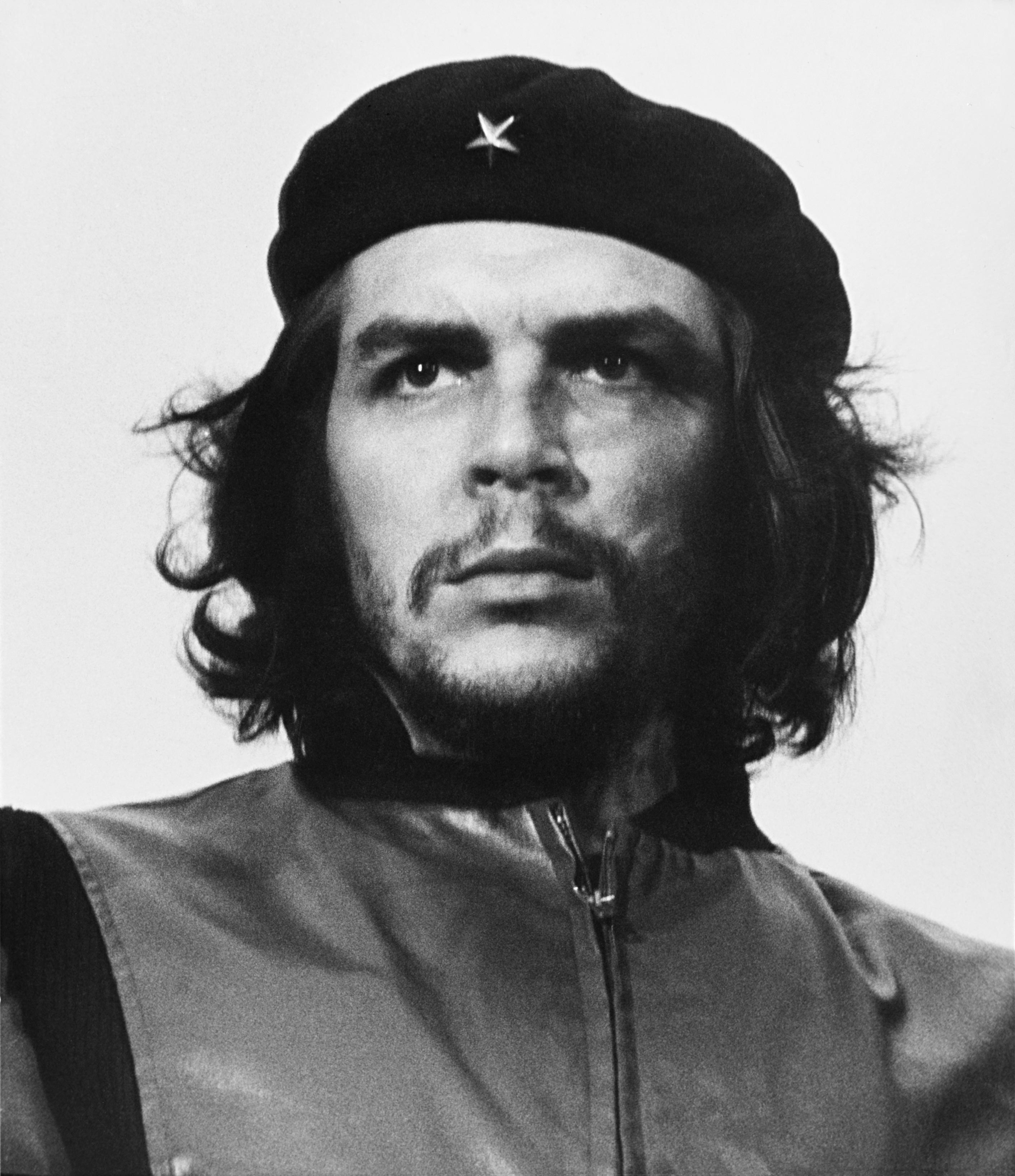
Alberto Korda's Guerrillero Heroico, the most iconic photo of Che Guevara

Appearances of Argentine Marxist revolutionary Che Guevara (1928–1967) in popular culture are common throughout the world. During his lifetime he was a highly politicized and controversial figure, in death his stylized image has been transformed into a worldwide emblem for an array of causes, representing a complex mesh of sometimes conflicting narratives. Che Guevara's image is viewed as everything from an inspirational icon of revolution, to a retro and vintage logo. Most commonly he is represented by a facial caricature originally by Irish artist Jim Fitzpatrick and based on Alberto Korda's famous 1960 photograph titled Guerrillero Heroico. The evocative simulacra abbreviation of the photographic portrait allowed for easy reproduction and instant recognizability across various uses. For many around the world, Che has become a commercial general symbol of the underdog, the idealist, the iconoclast, or the martyr. He has become, as author Michael Casey notes in Che's Afterlife: The Legacy of an Image, "the quintessential postmodern icon signifying anything to anyone and everything to everyone."

Che Guevara's likeness has undergone continual apotheosis while being weaved throughout the public consciousness in a variety of ways. From being viewed as a "Saintly Christ-like" figure by the rural poor in Bolivia where he was executed, to being viewed as an idealistic insignia for youth, longing for a vague sense of rebellion. His likeness can also be seen on posters, hats, key chains, mouse pads, hoodies, beanies, flags, berets, backpacks, bandannas, belt buckles, wallets, watches, wall clocks, Zippo lighters, pocket flasks, bikinis, personal tattoos, and most commonly T-shirts. Meanwhile, his life story can be found in an array of films, documentaries, plays, and songs of tribute. Throughout television, music, books, magazines, and even corporate advertisements, Che's visage is an ever-present political and apolitical emblem that has been endlessly mutated, transformed, and morphed over the last fifty years of visual popular culture. This allows Che to operate as "both a fashionable de-politicized logo, as well as a potent anti-establishment symbol used by a wide spectrum of human rights movements and individuals affirming their own liberation."

Additionally, his face has evolved into many manifestations and represents a Rashomon effect to those who observe its use. To some it is merely a generic high street visual emblem of global marketing, while to others it represents the notion of dissent, civil disobedience, or political awareness. Conversely, to those ideologically opposed to Che Guevara's belief in World revolution, or to those that resent his veneration because of his violent actions, his propagation represents shallow ignorant kitsch, idolatry worthy of spoof makeovers, parody, or even ridicule. Despite the competing narratives, Che has become a widely disseminated counter-cultural symbol that sometimes even operates entirely independent of the man himself. Hannah Charlton of The Sunday Times made note of the varying uses by postulating that "T-shirt wearers might wear Che's face as an easy replacement for real activism, or as a surrogate for it."

== Genesis ==
Pop's depersonalization and standardization simplified Che's image and helped align him with the masses, at the same time certifying his image as everyman. Pop's aesthetic pushed towards absolutely unambiguous and uninflected meaning and repeatability. Warholian Pop deals with outlines and surfaces rather than full chiaroscuro. This reduction of the real world provided the perfect vehicle for distancing the image from the complexities and ambiguities of actual life and the reduction of the political into stereotype. Che lives in these images as an ideal abstraction.

— Jonathan Green, UCR Museum of Photography director

Walk through any major metropolis around the globe and it is likely that you will come across an image of Che Guevara, most commonly a stylized version of Korda's iconic Guerrillero Heroico. An archetype, capable of endless visual regeneration which, depending on your opinion, either helps tell the story of 20th century visual literacy or kitsch banality. According to Hannah Charlton, editor of Che Guevara: Revolutionary and Icon, "By the 1990s the global market saw the emergence of what Naomi Klein has called a 'market marsala'—a bilingual mix of North and South, some Latin, some R&B, all couched in global party politics." By embodying corporate identities that appear radically individualistic and perpetually new, the brands attempt to inoculate themselves against accusations that they are selling sameness. The next stage is to present consumption as a code, where mega brands, supposedly reflecting the "indie" values of their purchasing audience, can do so with a knowing irony that of course the buyer can remain seemingly untouched by the corporate values underpinning the transaction.

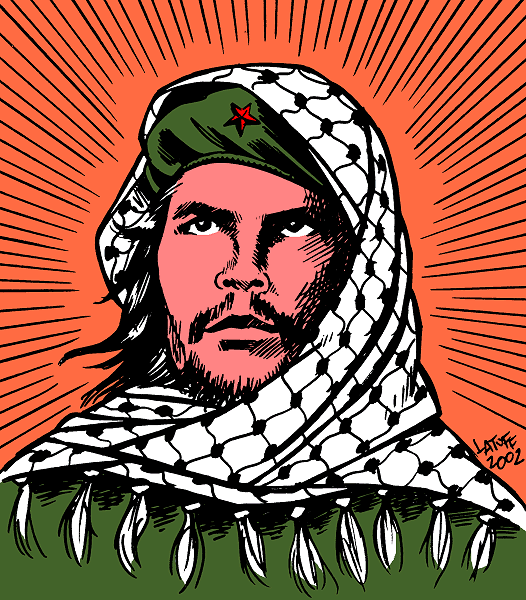
A 2002 political cartoon by artist Carlos Latuff, depicting Guevara wearing a Palestinian keffiyeh in modern-day solidarity.

Enter Che: the 1960s symbol of student revolution, the all-pervasive ascetic gaze used to add allure and mystique to a product, because either a sophisticated audience is savvy enough to distinguish between revolution and commerce while enjoying the irony, or oblivious of who he is or what he represents. This began the metamorphosis from Che the martyred resistance fighter beloved by many, and Che the violent Marxist revolutionary despised by others, to his dual paradoxical position in the global corporate capitalist culture. The commodification of the image has been ongoing since his death, and since the late 1990s has seen a resurgence. UCLA art historian David Kunzle, has described the phenomenon by noting "if you go to Havana today, you will not see Che with a gun, you will see him with a rose or a dove. He's become the Gandhi of Cuba."

This abiding 'renaissance' of Che's visage, is chronicled by filmmaker and Guggenheim scholar Trisha Ziff, who explores the genesis, continuing adaptation, and history of Che Guevara's famous image in the 2008 documentary "Chevolution". In another documentary titled Personal Che (2007), filmmakers Adriana Marino and Douglas Duarte document the numerous ways that people around the world re-create Che in their own image.

Hannah Charlton hypothesizes that "appropriating the aura of Che for brand building, has now given rise to a new resurgence of "Che-ness" that transcends branding in its global appeal. In the shifting complexities of intercultural values, in the search for universal images that can speak across borders and boundaries, today's global image of Che is the most successful." The Che face, more than any other icon according to Charlton, can keep accruing new application without relinquishing its essence – a generic and positive version of anti-status quo and liberation from any oppressive force, and a general, romantic, non-specific fantasy about change and revolution.

Some argue that history has transformed Che's revolutionary image into just another fashion accessory. It is tempting for those of us on the left to feel uncomfortable with his popular appeal; rather like music fans who, when their favorite underground band hits the big time, moan that they've 'gone commercial' ... I don't see it that way. If only 10 percent of the people who wear the image know what he stood for, that is still many millions. Overwhelmingly, they are also young people, with their hearts set on making the world a better place. Indeed, in my experience, many more than 10 percent have a very good idea of what he stood for ... If Che's image seems to be everywhere, that is because what he fought and died for is more fashionable than ever.

— George Galloway, British politician, New Statesman

== In advertising ==
There's something about that man in the photo, the Cuban revolutionary with the serious eyes, scruffy beard and dark beret. Ernesto "Che" Guevara is adored. He is loathed. Dead for nearly 40 years, he is everywhere – as much a cultural icon as James Dean or Marilyn Monroe, perhaps even more so among a new generation of admirers who've helped turn a devout Marxist into a capitalist commodity.

— Martha Irvine, The Washington Post

- A French businessman has Che Perfume by Chevignon, "Dedicated to those who want to feel and smell like revolutionaries."
- Converse uses the image of Che Guevara in one of their shoe ad campaigns.
- In 2008, Romanian auto maker Dacia (a subsidiary of Renault) produced a new commercial advertising their new Logan MCV station wagon titled "revolution". The ad, utilizing actors, begins with Fidel Castro's arriving at a remote villa, where he finds a host of other modern era revolutionaries, and ends with his standing on the back patio, where Che Guevara tells Karl Marx that "it is time for another revolution". Marx responds, "Che, it's about what people need."
- The Che brand of cigarettes is named after Guevara.
- "El Ché-Cola" donates 50% of their net profits to NGOs, and has the slogan: "Change your habits to change the world."
- In 1970, the Italian company Olivetti utilized Che's image for an ad celebrating its creative sales force. It read, "We would have hired him".
- Smirnoff vodka attempted to use the image of Che Guevara in an advertising campaign in 2000, but was stopped in court by photographer Alberto Korda, who took the original iconic image.
- For an advertising campaign, Taco Bell dressed up a chihuahua like Che Guevara and had him state: "Yo quiero Taco Bell!", Spanish for: "I want Taco Bell!" When asked about the allusion to Che, Taco Bell's advertising director, Chuck Bennett, stated: "We wanted a heroic leader to make it a massive taco revolution."

Does Che survive only as a t-shirt icon? The big media and many Che biographers have stressed the kitchification of Che, the former with glee, the latter with regret. Has the once fearsome revolutionary been reduced to a harmless icon? The corporate world adept at co-optation would have us think so. Rather, I would say that the "real" Che has not died, but undergone a tactical shift.

— David Kunzle, author of Che Guevara: Icon, Myth, and Message
- The New York-based distributing company Raichle Molitor utilized a "Che look-alike contest" in order to create marketing buzz for their line of Fischer's Revolution skis. In defending their reasoning, product manager Jim Fleischer stated that "the Che image, just the icon and not the man's doings, represented what we wanted: revolution and extreme change."
- In an advertisement for Jean Paul Gaultier sunglasses circulated in Europe in 1999, Che is painted as a Frida Kahlo-type landscape, in front of a blazing desert sun.
- Leica (which was the camera used by Alberto Korda to capture Guerrillero Heroico) has used an image of their camera with Che's red star to advertise their "revolutionary camera."
- The offices of the Financial Times in London, features a large poster of a Che-esque Richard Branson greeting visitors in a beret, while pronouncing "We live in financial times".
- In November 2008, The Bobblehead LLC company released a limited edition of 100 Che Guevara bobbleheads. Creator and owner Rick Lynn announced that it had been a "long time dream" to create the hand painted and custom designed pieces, which will be hand signed and numbered as a collector's item.
- In December 2008, the Tartan Army began selling t-shirts with "Scotland's favorite son" Robert Burns in the mould of the iconic image of Che Guevara. The proceeds will go to organizations that assist disadvantaged and chronically ill children in countries the Tartan Army visit.

=== Businesses / restaurants ===
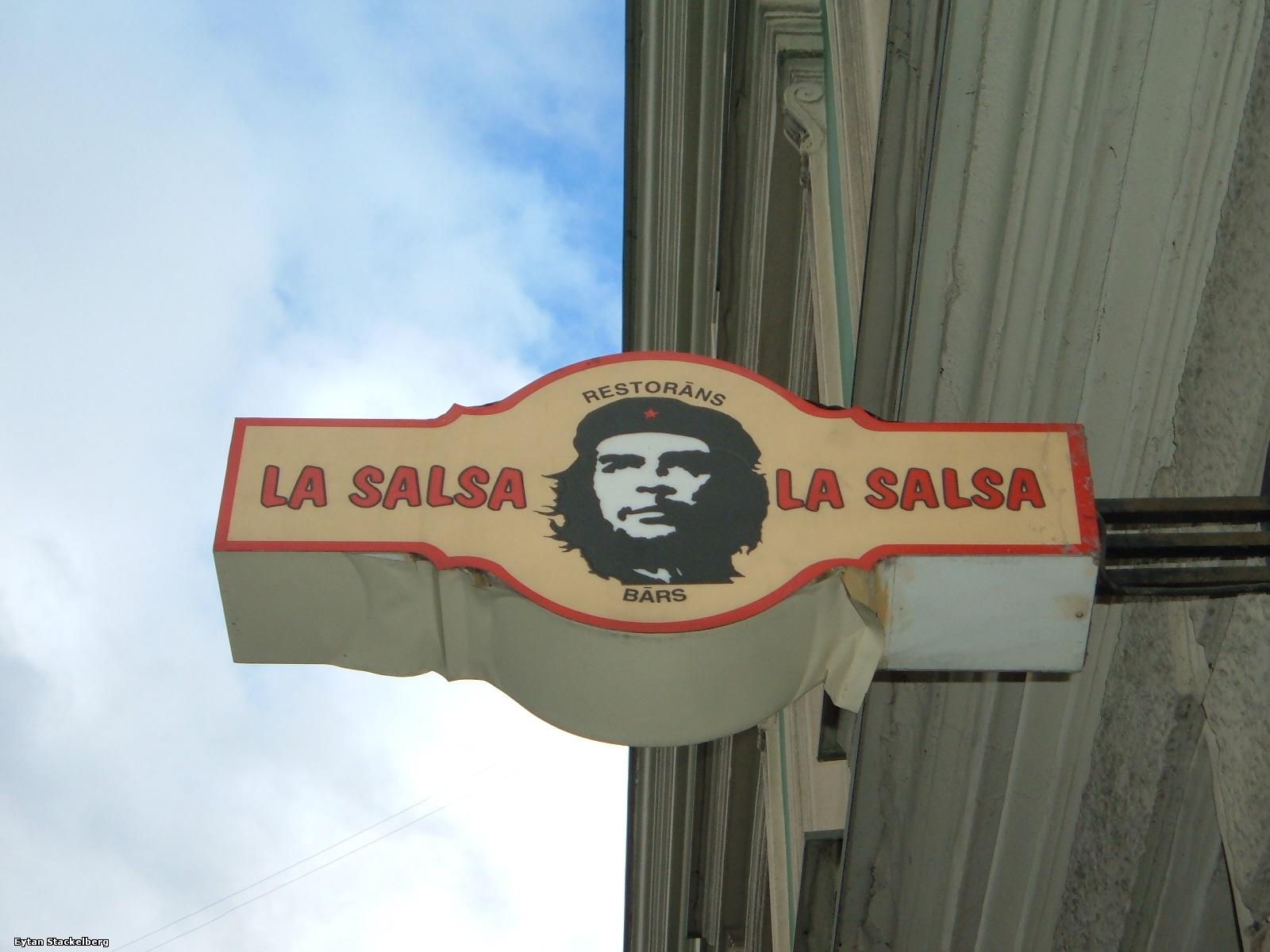
A Cuban restaurant in Riga, Latvia.

40 years after his death Che is as much a marketing tool as an international revolutionary icon. Which raises the question of what exactly does the sheer proliferation of his image – the distant gaze, the scraggly beard and the beret adorned with a star – mean in a decidedly capitalist world?

— Marc Lacey, The New York Times

- The Russian capital, Moscow, features a Club Che, which is a vibrant Latin American-themed club staffed by Cuban waiters.
- The Russian city of St. Petersburg features a Cafe Club Che (lounge, bar, & jazz club) where patrons can get their hands on a shot of Cuban rum and a fine Cuban cigar at the drop of a military beret.
- Cairo, Egypt features a Che Guevara-themed nightclub, where the waiters dress in uniformed black berets.
- The Slovenian capital Ljubljana contains a Che Bar, where images of the man decorate every wall and surface.
- Zagreb, Croatia contained a restaurant named Che Wap, specializing mostly in ćevapi, but has since then closed.
- San Diego features Che Cafe on the UCSD campus.
- Colombo, Sri Lanka, features a Café CHé, whose walls "take you through the life of the iconic revolutionary leader."
- Lipscani, a district of downtown Bucharest, Romania, features the popular bar, El Grande Comandante, which is made to look like a "basement shrine to Che Guevara."
- Lagos Island, Nigeria features a Che Lounge & Steakhouse, where Che's face appears on every square inch of glass available, on the menus, the waiters' t-shirts and lapel pins.
- Mexico City features a Cafe La Habana (Restaurant and Cafe) where it is believed it was the spot that Che Guevara and Fidel Castro met multiple times to plot the Cuban Revolution in exile.
- The city of London Ontario features a decidedly marxist decor and is named after Che Guevara.
- The capital city of North Macedonia, Skopje features a restaurant called Casa Cubana that has Latin American-theme with food and cocktail drinks (mojito, Cuba libre etc.)The walls are decorated with the Cuban flag and photos of Che Guevara, Fidel Castro and Camilo Cienfuegos and also there are hosted parties with Latin music.

== In art ==
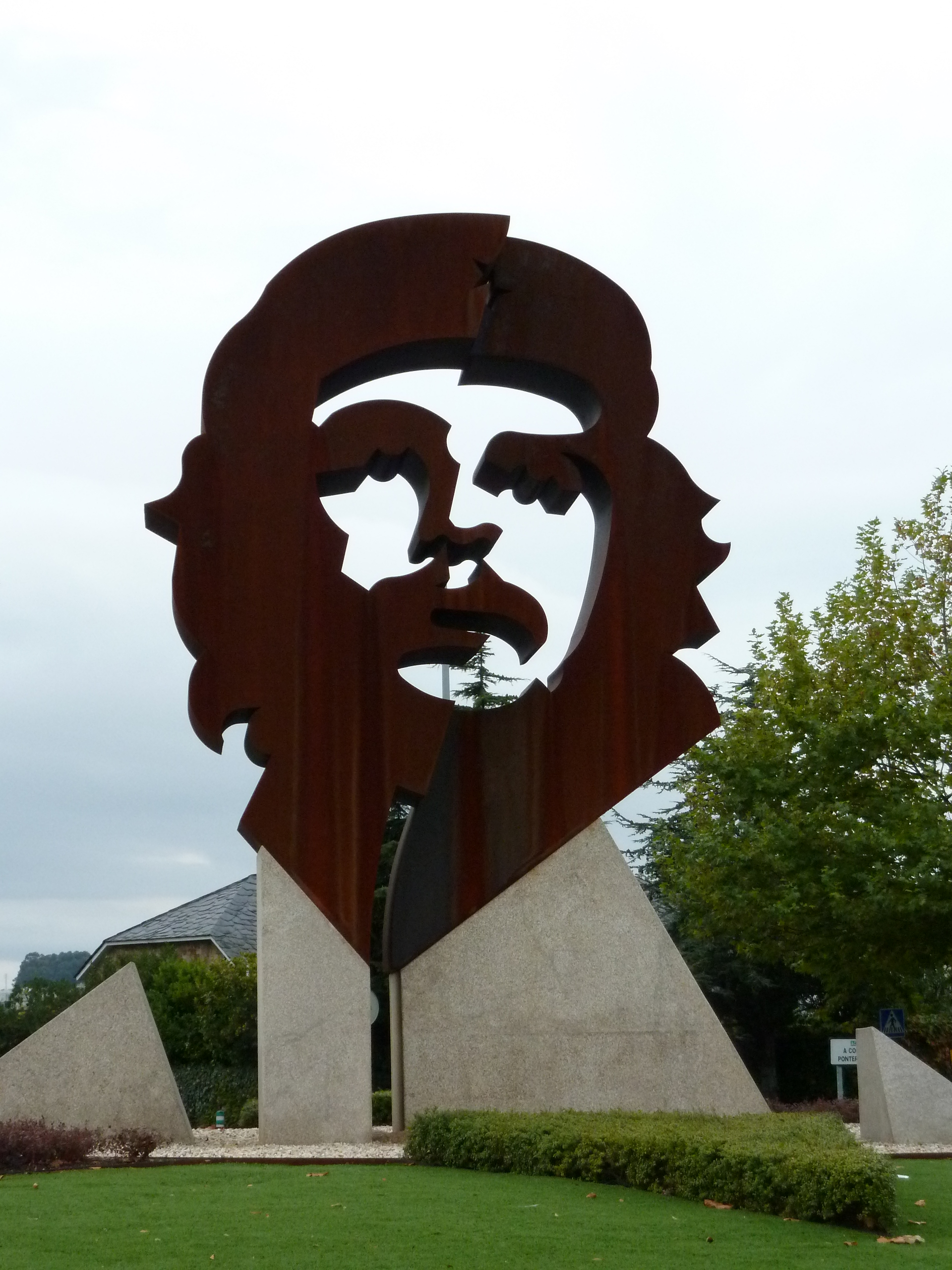
A large Che statue in Oleiros, Spain.

Possibly more than the Mona Lisa, more than images of Christ, more than comparable icons such as The Beatles or Monroe, Che's image has continued to hold the imagination of generation after generation.

— Hannah Charlton, The Sunday Times

- British pop artist Sir Peter Blake has referred to Guerrillero Heroico as "one of the great icons of the 20th century."
- Irish artist Jim Fitzpatrick converted Korda's picture into a high contrast stylized drawing, which since has become iconic and is frequently seen in silkscreen or stencil art.
- The Cuban Ministry for the Interior building features a large, stylised outline of Che's face above the phrase "Hasta la Victoria Siempre" (Direct translation to English: "Until victory, always").
- In 1996, Argentine/American artist Leandro Katz displayed his "Project For The Day You'll Love Me" exhibit in Harlem, New York. The accumulative series of installations dealt with Freddy Aborta's 1967 mortuary photograph of Guevara and included a 41-foot-long (12 m) timeline of the revolutionary's life. Furthermore, Katz interprets Alborta's photo in a series of photomontages, which also include paintings of a dead Jesus Christ.
- In 2005 an exhibition examining the Korda portrait titled Revolution & Commerce: The Legacy of Korda's Portrait of Che Guevara, was organized by Jonathan Green and Trisha Ziff for UCR/California Museum of Photography. This exhibition has traveled to International Center of Photography, New York; Centro de la Imagen, Mexico City; and the Victoria & Albert Museum, London.
- Cuban artist José Toirac has exhibited a piece titled Requiem, which contains a video of the dead bullet-riddled body of Guevara, which Toirac tortuously pans, inch by inch. The video, which serves as a quasi religious meditation, is shown inside a mausoleum-type enclosure.
- The cover of the January 1972 edition of National Lampoon magazine features a parody of the Alberto Korda's iconic photo in which Che is hit in the face with a cream pie.
- A parody of the famous Che Guevara poster was used on the cover of the March 2008 edition of Mad magazine, with Alfred E. Neuman's head replacing Guevara's.

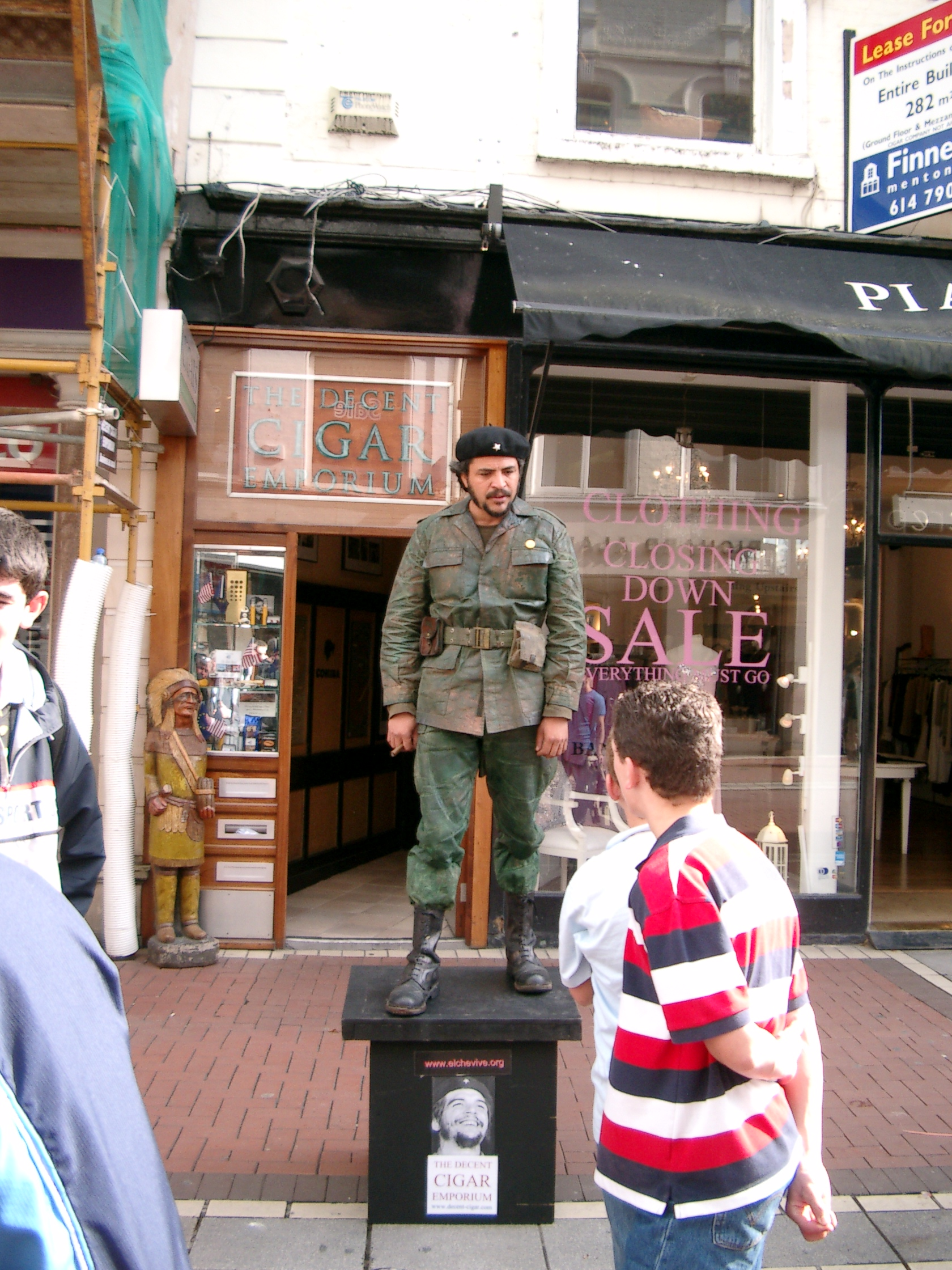
A Che Guevara street impersonator in Dublin, Ireland.

In the late 1960s, the Guerrillero Heroic image became part of the pictures of “the global sixties.” This is a “transnational migration of symbols,” as Eric Zolov puts it, through which youth subcultures in Mexico, Uruguay, and France embraced the face of Guevara to represent a common commitment to rebellion against imperialism and conformity. The poster image was so common as to become a synonym of leftist politics but also a sign that could be separated from ideology and reapplied in a new context. In the 1970s, when such movements started, it remained as a symbolic sign of rebellion rather than as an ideological commitment.

- American artist Trek Thunder Kelly has a 2005 painting titled Che Guevara: The Instigator, which features the famous guerrilla in a spoof Dolce & Gabbana ad.
- French assemblage artist Bernard Pras created a 2007 composite work modeled after Guerrillero Heroico.
- The 2009 Contact Photography Festival at Toronto's Museum of Contemporary Canadian Art featured a piece titled "Dancing with Che" by artist Barbara Astman. The work comprised a series of 50 photographs wherein Astman dances in a Che Guevara t-shirt, for the benefit of her Polaroid's timed shutter.
- Manhattan's International Center of Photography held a 2006 exhibit titled "Che ! Revolution and Commerce."
- The Montreal Museum of Fine Art used Guevara's image to advertise their 2004 expose titled Global Village: The 1960s.
- The Italian artist Luca Del Baldo has six paintings featuring the post-mortem face of Che Guevara.
- In October 2007, the Frieze Art Fair unveiled a life size bronze statue by Christian Jankowski in London's Regent's Park. The piece, which in 2008 was also displayed in New York City's Central Park, portrays a well known Barcelona street performer dressed as Che Guevara.
- In January 2009, artist Juan Vazquez Martin, who fought alongside Che Guevara during the Cuban Revolution, held an exhibition with 13 of his paintings in Derry, Northern Ireland. The Guevara inspired works were shown as part of the Bloody Sunday commemoration weekend. Martin stated that he was "emotional" and "inspired" during his visit, upon seeing a mural celebrating Che Guevara's Irish connection to the Bogside.
- A picture of Che Guevara hung in John Lennon and Yoko Ono's kitchen.

=== Body art ===
- Argentine football legend Diego Maradona had a tattoo portrait of Che Guevara on his right arm.
- Former heavyweight boxing champion Mike Tyson has a tattoo of Che Guevara, derived from Guerrillero Heroico, on the left side of his abdomen. In 1999, Tyson described Guevara as "An incredible individual. He had so much, but sacrificed it all for the benefit of other people."
- Former English professional footballer Darren Currie has a large tattoo on the left side of his stomach of Che Guevara. When asked about the motivation for the piece, Currie stated that he had been reading Che's book since he was 14, and that he "admired the way he went out of his way about things."
- Argentine Juan Sebastián Verón, the 2008 South American Footballer of the Year, has a tattoo of Che's face on his shoulder. When his S.S. Lazio won the 1999 Serie A championship, some of the team's Italian fans who initially didn't like the tattoo, came into the dressing room and kissed it.
- Former Italian footballer Fabrizio Miccoli has a large Che Guevara tattoo on his left calf. As a result, when he played for Ternana Calcio from 1998 to 2002, the team's fans would unveil a large stadium sized banner bearing the image of Che along with Moccoli's club shirt and the hammer and sickle.
- Swedish Olympic boxer Kwamena Turkson has the image of Che Guevara tattooed on his arm.
- Former South African footballer, Mark Fish, who helped his country to its African Cup of Nations victory in 1996, has a tattoo of Che Guevara.

== In entertainment and media ==
=== In comedy ===
- American comedian Margaret Cho, on the cover of her stand-up act Revolution (2003) combines her face into an obvious appropriation of Che Guevara's famous graphic-portrait.

=== In films ===
Che Guevara was an amazing character. He's a person that changed the world and really forces me to change the rules of what I am.

— Gael García Bernal, portrayed Che in The Motorcycle Diaries

Benicio del Toro in the 2008 biopic Che.

Actors who have portrayed Che Guevara:

- Francisco Rabal in El Che Guevara (1968)
- Omar Sharif in Che! (1969)
- Terry Gilliam in the World Forum/Communist Quiz sketch in the Monty Python's Flying Circus episode "Spam" (1970).
- Michael Palin in the World Forum/Communist Quiz sketch during the concert film Monty Python Live at the Hollywood Bowl (1982)
- Miguel Ruiz Días in El Che (1997)
- Alfredo Vasco in Hasta la Victoria Siempre (1999)
- Gael García Bernal in Fidel (2002)
- Karl Sheils in Meeting Che Guevara & the Man from Maybury Hill (2003)
- Gael García Bernal in The Motorcycle Diaries (2004)
- Jsu Garcia in The Lost City (2005)
- Martin Hyder in The Mark Steel Lectures: Che Guevara (2006)
- Sam G. Preston in The True Story of Che Guevara (2007)
- Eduardo Noriega in Che (2007)
- Benicio del Toro in Che (2008)

==== Other ====
I think anyone who buys a t-shirt of Che has gotta be cool. If I see someone with a Che t-shirt, I think, "He's got good taste".

— Benicio del Toro, portrayed Guevara in the 2008 biopic Che

- In the 1972 Peruvian film Cholo, the character of Hugo Sotil confronts a guy throwing stones with a sling wearing a Che Guevara t-shirt, states that Che "was a man, a symbol" and, unlike him, a rebel.
- In John Carpenter's Escape From L.A. (1996), Cuervo Jones, a fictional character played by the Greek-French actor Georges Corraface, was clearly based on Ernesto "Che" Guevara.
- In the 1998 film Fear and Loathing in Las Vegas, Johnny Depp depicting Hunter S. Thompson awakens from an adrenochrome overdose and stands in front of a picture of Che Guevara stuck to a Mexican flag. Benicio del Toro who co starred in the film (and would later play Che Guevara in Che), has stated that Thompson kept a "big" picture of Che in his kitchen.
- In the 2003 documentary Breakfast with Hunter, acclaimed author Hunter S. Thompson can be seen in several scenes wearing different Che Guevara t-shirts.
- Actress Lindsay Lohan dons a Che Guevara t-shirt in one scene of the 2004 film Confessions of a Teenage Drama Queen.
- Indian actor Rajat Kapoor was made up to resemble Guevara in the 2009 Bollywood thriller Siddharth-The Prisoner. In describing the reasoning, director Pryas Gupta stated that the central concept of the film is "freedom from the complexities of life" while remarking "who better than Che Guevara, to represent that spirit."
- James Benning utilizes Richard Dindo's documentary Ernesto Che Guevara: The Bolivian Diaries to form his own 1997 avant-garde film titled Utopia. The film juxtaposes Che's vehement opposition to imperialism, with the importing of low-wage Mexican laborers in the California desert to farm the Imperial Valley.
- The 1983 Yugoslavian film Kako sam Sistematski Uništen od Idiota (How I Was Systematically Destroyed by an Idiot), directed and co-written by Slobodan Šijan, prominently revolves around the ideas of Che Guevara. In the film, the character Babi Papuška, played by Danilo "Bata" Stojković, is searching for a real revolutionary society and a real revolution. The film opens and closes with Babi reciting a poem at rallies in Che's honor.
- In Quentin Tarantino's Reservoir Dogs, the character of Detective Jim Holdaway wears a Che Guevara t-shirt when conversing with the film's protagonist Mr. Orange in a diner.
- Leandro Katz's 1997 film essay El Día Que Me Quieras (The Day You'll Love Me) is a meditation on Freddy Alborta's famous post-mortem photo of Che Guevara. Katz deconstructs and re-photographs the famous picture while drawing comparisons to the classic paintings of Mantegna's "Dead Christ" and Rembrandt's "The Anatomy Lesson".
- The 2008 Telugu film, Jalsa, starring Pawan Kalyan and directed by Trivikram Srinivas borrowed Guevara's look from his famous photograph to model Kalyan's look in the second half of the film as a Naxalite. Kalyan himself is a follower of Che and suggest Srinivas to use Guevara's ideologies in the movie.
- The Star Wars character Saw Gerrera, that was introduced in the 2008 animated television series The Clone Wars and voiced by Andrew Kishino. Saw Gerrera's name is a "mnemonic riff" on the name of the Argentinian revolutionary Che Guevara. Gerrera is also a heterograph of the Spanish word "guerrera", meaning "female warrior", describing his sister Steela. He subsequently appeared in the 2016 film Rogue One and its 2022 prequel live-action television series Andor portrayed by Forest Whitaker.
- In the 2024 film Saturday Night, Che is mentioned by the protagonist Lorne Michaels (played by Gabriel LaBelle) in an elevator pitch during a speech.
- A red shade with the face of Che appears next to another with the Circle-A anarchist symbol in the 2025 film The Running Man by Edgar Wright.

=== In games ===
Rebels and activists the world over still take inspiration from Guevara. But the image has lost something; Che's face on a poster in 1968 isn't quite the same thing as it is on a mousepad 40 years later. Perhaps it is precisely that loss – the shedding of Che's radicalism and ideological rigor – that renders him so supremely marketable today.

— Ben Ehrenreich, Los Angeles Times

- The design of Zeus Bertrand, Kantaris' right-hand man in Time Crisis: Project Titan, features more or less identical resemblances with Che Guevara.
- His exploits during the Cuban Revolution were very loosely dramatized in the 1987 video game Guevara, released by SNK in Japan and "converted" into Guerrilla War for Western audiences, removing all references to Guevara but keeping all the visuals and a game map that clearly resembles Cuba. As a result of its rarity, original copies of the "Guevara" edition of the Japanese Famicom edition go for high amounts on the collectors' market.
- The 2001 construction and management simulation computer game Tropico allows players to govern a tropical island while amidst a theme similar to that of Cuba after the Cuban revolution. Players may either design their own "El Presidente" character or select one from a list of pre-made historical figures, one of which is Che Guevara.
- The box art for Just Cause, (the 2006 videogame for PC, Xbox, Xbox 360, and PlayStation 2) imitates the famous photograph of Che Guevara taken by Alberto Korda. The main character in the game of Rico Rodriguez is also based on CIA agent Félix Rodríguez, who was present for Che Guevara's capture and eventual execution in Bolivia.

In cyberspace there are hundreds of Che Web pages in every language from Italian to Norwegian.

— Newsweek
- On November 16, 2008, a new world record for the number of dominoes toppled in one turn was set in the Netherlands. The 4,345,027 falling dominoes tumbled for two hours and along with other images, revealed a portrait of Che Guevara.
- On April 29, 2004, one of the largest simultaneous chess games in history was played with 13,000 boards set up in front of the Che Guevara Mausoleum in Santa Clara, Cuba. The games of chess, which was Guevara's personal favorite, included the participation of President Fidel Castro. A similar event took place again in 2007 to commemorate the 40th anniversary of Che's death in Bolivia, when 1,500 chess boards were played at once. Villa Clara Grandmaster Jesús Nogueiras dedicated the chess extravaganza to Che, remarking that "there will always be Grandmasters thanks to the revolution that Che helped make a reality."
- In 2009, it was announced that GlobalFun would be releasing a mobile phone game titled El Che. Described as a "great looking, action packed, freedom fighting excursion into the historical battles of Sierra Maestra, Bueycito and Santa Clara", El Che allows cell phone users to choose from an arsenal of assault rifles, shotguns, grenades and rocket launchers, while you attempt "to bring peace to impoverished Cuba."
- In Metal Gear Solid: Peace Walker, Che is referenced several times in the audio briefings, and several aspects of his persona are discussed. The character of Big Boss is partially inspired by Guevara.
- In the 2010 first person shooter, Call of Duty: Black Ops one of the multi-player maps available for the player to play is named "Havana" and shows many different pieces of art painted on walls including at least one of Jim Fitzpatrick's version of Guerrillero Heroico.
- A 2013 Cuban-made PC video game titled Gesta Final: Camino a la Victoria (Final Fight: Road to Victory) is based on Che Guevara and Fidel Castro's exploits during the Cuban Revolution.
- In the 2023 tactical role-playing game Persona 5 Tactica, a spinoff of 2016's Persona 5, Che Guevera is depicted as the Persona - a physical manifestation of human psyche - arising from Toshiro Kasukabe, a Japanese Diet member and potential Prime Ministerial candidate. Abducted by supernatural forces and imprisoned in a subconscious realm composed of kingdoms ruled by cruel tyrants, Toshiro is rescued by the Phantom Thieves of Hearts with the help of a female revolutionary leader, Erina, who resembles Toshiro's old high-school friend that inspired his fight for social justice. Upon Toshiro confronting one of his captors who turns out to be his Shadow self, Erina transforms and is revealed to be Toshiro's Persona Ernesto, a gender-swapped depiction of Guevera identifiable by a beret with a star (giving her facial silhouette a stylized resemblance to Che's iconic image), with ammunition bandoleers lining her coat and giant pistols for legs.

=== In literature and publications ===
As the possibility of real political change recedes, people do need symbols of resistance; it makes them feel better, and Che is that par excellence. Yes, he was handsome. Yes, he died young. But I would say more important than any of those things, he was a rebel.

— Colin Robinson, managing director of Verso Books publishing house

==== Books ====
- To coincide with the 40th anniversary of his execution, Che in Verse reproduced 134 poems and songs from 53 countries about the enigmatic revolutionary. The book examines how Che was celebrated or remembered from before his death to the present day, and also explores Guevara's own interest in poetry. It reveals among other things considerable interest in the Argentine revolutionary among radical writers in the US, and contains 19 poems by North American poets, including Allen Ginsberg, Robert Lowell, John Haines, Greg Hewett, Michael McClure and Thomas Merton.
- In the novel I, Che Guevara by John Blackthorn (a pen name of former Senator Gary Hart), Guevara returns to Cuba under an alias during its first ever democratic election. Espousing an ideology of direct democracy and a government run exclusively via New England–style town meetings, he sponsors a professor's grassroots third party run for President of Cuba, opposing both the Communist Party and a Cuban American/White House-backed right-wing party.
- Guevara's image is on the cover of the book The Rebel Sell.
- Robert Arellano's 2009 novel Havana Lunar is set during the 1992 Special Period in Cuba, and tells the story of Manolo Rodríguez, a doctor who in spite of being estranged from the Communist party, idealizes their revolutionary principles and talks to a Che Guevara portrait in his home.
- In Lavie Tidhar's short story, "The Lives and Deaths of Che Guevara", published in the anthology Solaris Rising, ed. Ian Whates, 2011, Che is cloned multiple times, allowing him to fight (and die) in numerous 20th century revolutions, from Apartheid South Africa to the Lebanese Civil War and beyond.
- In the alternative history anthology Alternate Outlaws the story "Red Elvis" ponders the question of what if Elvis Presley decided to be a Communist. The cover illustration features the singer wearing a guerilla uniform as Che Guevara.

==== Comics ====
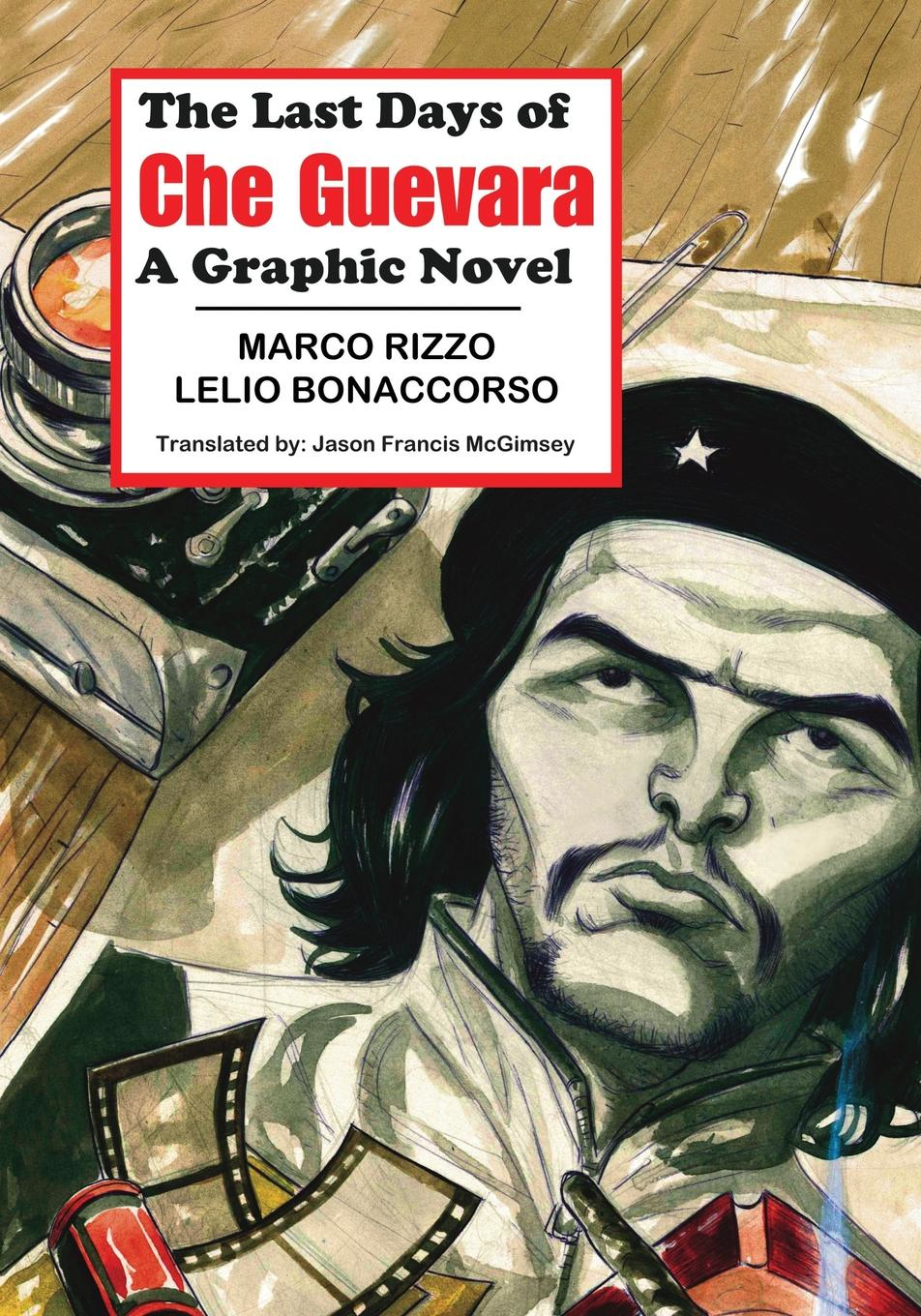
Cover art from The Last Days of Che Guevara comic book

- Vida del Che ("Life of Che", 1968), written by Héctor Germán Oesterheld and illustrated by Enrique and Alberto Breccia. A biographical Historieta (comic book) published as a graphic novel only three months after Che Guevara's assassination; it was subsequently banned by the military dictatorship self-styled as "Argentine Revolution" (1966–1973) and the whole edition was kidnapped. The original drawings were saved by Enrique Breccia, and it was finally republished in 2008.
- Pastores ("Shepherds", 1985), written and illustrated by Horacio Altuna.
- Che: una biografía gráfica ("Che: a graphic biography" 2010), written by Sid Jacobson and illustrated by Ernie Colón.
- The Last Days of Che Guevara (2014). Red Quill Books published this radical graphic novel of Che's life written by Italian journalist Marco Rizzo and illustrated by Lelio Bonaccorso.
- In the memoir Persepolis by Marjane Satrapi, the main character dressed up as Che as a child and played with her friends, who portrayed other revolutionaries.
- In the manga, Baki Hanma, there's a character inspired and named after Che. Considered 'The Second' and given immense freedom in prison, this Japanese, ninjitsu-practicing island leader named Jun "Che" Guevaru sought to prove his island's independence from the United States, even going as far as to threaten President Bush. He's eventually sent to the Black Pentagon, where he fights, and loses, to Biscuit Oliva, before escaping to his homeland.

==== Magazines ====
- Che was featured on the cover of the edition of August 8, 1960, of Time, which declared Guevara "Castro's Brain".
- Time magazine named Che Guevara one of the 100 most influential people of the 20th century, while listing him in the "heroes and icons" section.
- The May/June 2006 cover of Communication Arts magazine features yellow and black stencil outline of Che, but his beret star is replaced with a Nike swoosh logo, and he is wearing the iconic white headset of an iPod. Release of the cover overloaded the magazine with both positive and negative responses, while generating more newsstand sales than any issue in the magazine's 50-year history.
- The December 2008 issue of Rolling Stone Argentina features Che's well known Guerrillero Heroico image on the cover.
- The cover of Issue 8 of AkzoNobel's A Magazine features a variant of Jim Fitzpatrick's famous portrait of Guevara.

=== In music ===
And if there's any hope for America, it lies in a revolution, and if there's any hope for a revolution in America, it lies in getting Elvis Presley to become Che Guevara.

— Phil Ochs, the liner notes of The Broadside Tapes

- Jazz bassist Charlie Haden composed a piece titled "Song for Che" after Guevara was killed. While performing with Ornette Coleman in Portugal in 1971, Haden dedicated "Song for Che" to the Black Peoples Liberation Movements of Mozambique, Angola, and Guinea-Bissau in protest against the Estado Novo (Portugal) authoritarian regime. The next day, Haden was arrested by the PIDE and imprisoned and interrogated for possibly a day or two, before being rescued by the Cultural Attaché from the American Embassy.
- Punk band The (International) Noise Conspiracy's musical inspiration was stated to be the above Ochs quote.
- Upon hearing the news of Guevara's leaving Cuba to start new revolutions in other countries, Cuban musician Carlos Puebla composed "Hasta Siempre, Comandante." Since then it has been covered by numerous artists including the Buena Vista Social Club. French singer Nathalie Cardone produced a modern rendition of the song titled "Hasta Siempre" as an ode to honor Guevara. Cardone's single sold over 800,000 copies in France alone.
- Folk singer Judy Collins composed a ballad titled "Che" as an ode to Che Guevara after his death. The song was then remixed into an "intense rhythmic interpretation" for a 2009 tribute album titled Born to the Breed by artist James Mudriczki. Collins singled out this song as one of her favorite tracks, while describing Mudriczki's rendition as "marvelous".
- The German composer Hans Werner Henze dedicated his 1968 oratorio Das Floß der Medusa as a requiem for Guevera.
- In 1968, Scottish songwriter Ewan MacColl composed the song "The Compañeros" in honor of Che Guevara and the Cuban Revolution. His wife Peggy Seeger also wrote "A Song for Che Guevara."
- The Spanish punk rock group Boikot, released a 1997 CD titled La Ruta del Che. Upon release of the album, a band member told the newspaper El País that "Guevara represents a universal concept of revolution, I believe we all carry a Che inside us, a way of making our own revolution."
- In 1987, the French rock band Indochine mentions Che Guevara in the song "Les Tzars".
- Grammy Award-winning Carlos Santana wore a Che Guevara shirt to the 2005 Oscar awards.
- The cover of Madonna's 2003 album American Life emulates Guerrillero Heroico, as she revealed to the Italian version of Top of the Pops. Madonna cited Che as a "revolutionary spirit" while adding that although she does not "necessarily agree with The Communist Manifesto, she believes that "there are aspects of socialism which are good", and that she "likes what (Che) stood for".

When someone asked me why I wore the Che T-shirt, I think I said something glib like, "I consider myself a revolutionary because I'm a self-made millionaire in a racist society." But it was really that it just felt right to me ... I also wasn't a Marxist like Che – the platinum Jesus piece made that pretty clear. Later I would read more about Guevara and discover similarities in our lives. I related to him as a kid who had asthma and played sports. I related to the power of his image, too ... Like a lot of people who stumble across the image with no context, I was still struck by its power and charisma.

— Jay-Z, November 2010
- In rapper Jay-Z's Black Album, the track "Public Service Announcement" contains the line "I'm like Che Guevara with bling on / I'm complex."
- "Indian Girl" by The Rolling Stones has a lyric referring to Che. "Mr. Gringo, my father he ain't no Che Guevara, And he's fighting the war on the streets of Masaya"
- The Nightwatchman aka (Tom Morello) references a quote from Che Guevara – "Liberators do not exist, the people liberate themselves" – in the music video for the song 'Road I Must Travel.'
- In rapper Nas's album, Stillmatic there is a controversial track named "My Country" that pays tribute to Che Guevara and others who were murdered by the United States.
- The Allstonians, a third wave ska/reggae band, released a 1997 album with a song called "Doctor Che Guevara."
- David Bowie's album, Lodger featured an inside sleeve containing one of the famous photographs of Guevara's corpse surrounded by his executioners.
- In Richard Shindell's 2004 album Vuelta the track "Che Guevara t-Shirt" tells the story of an illegal immigrant imprisoned after 9/11 who may be kept in jail forever because he carries a photo of his girlfriend wearing a Che Guevara t-shirt.
- In Kevin Johansen's song "Mc Guevara's o Che Donald's" the author compares the exploitation of the revolutionary's legacy and image to the franchising of McDonald's fast food chain.
- In Bersuit Vergarabat's album La Argentinidad al Palo the title's track name-drops Che Guevara as well as Carlos Gardel and Diego Maradona.
- On the track "It's Your World" from the rapper Common's 2005 album Be, the artist states "Wish I was free as Che was."
- In Pet Shop Boys' song "Left to My Own Devices" they mention with irony "Che Guevara and Debussy to a disco beat".
- The artist Immortal Technique has made several references to Guevara in his songs (No Me Importa, Internally Bleeding) and has performed many times while wearing a shirt bearing his image.
- In the Manic Street Preachers song, "Revol", there is the lyric "Che Guevara, you're all target now".
- The song "Hammerblow", off the Cherry Poppin' Daddies album Susquehanna, is a story-song about an underground Marxist uprising; a character in the song tells the narrator ""We haven't gone extinct/Unlike Che Guevara, Marx and Pravda"", assuring that though said revolutionaries may be gone, the movement continues.
- American rock band Chagall Guevara, took their name from artist Marc Chagall and Che Guevara, to imply the concept of "revolutionary art."
- The Australian punk band the Clap has a song called "Che Guevara T-Shirt Wearer" featuring the chorus lines of "you're a Che Guevara T-shirt wearer, and you have no idea who he is."
- American folk singer-songwriter Richard Shindell often introduces performances of his song "Che Guevara T-Shirt" with a story of the irony of the t-shirts. The song features Shindell lamenting on how "Che the great anti-capitalist revolutionary" has had his name and image thoroughly co-opted by the shirt makers not for revolutionary purposes but to make money for the company owners i.e. the capitalists.
- The band Rage Against the Machine has assorted band apparel with Che's image on it and recommends Guevara's manual "Guerrilla Warfare" in their liner notes. They also released a single called "Bombtrack" bearing Che's image and tour with a Guevara banner draped behind them while onstage.
- On October 12, 2007, musicians from the Chilean community and Grupo Amistad, performed songs dedicated to Che at a memorial celebration in Winnipeg, Manitoba, Canada.
- The Brazilian rock band Sepultura performed at Havana's "José Martí Anti-Imperialist Tribune" in July 2008, while also visiting the memorial to Che Guevara.
- American punk rock band Against Me! have a song called "Cliché Guevara" on their album As the Eternal Cowboy.
- Muslim-American rapper Rhymefest (whose birth name is 'Che' in honor of Guevara) titled his 2009 album "El Che", describing the overall theme as a "journey with a revolutionary."
- Artist Dana Lyons mentions Che Guevara in his song Cows with Guns.
- American noise rock band Che Guevara T-shirt named themselves after the phenomena outlined in this article, specifically the irony that a Marxist-inspired guerrilla is now used to sell capitalist products.
- In July 2009, Cuba's best known folk musician Silvio Rodríguez announced that had written a new song titled "Tonada del albedrio" (Tune to Free Will) intended to "rehabilitate" the image of revolutionary Che Guevara from being an "international super-brand". According to Rodriguez the new song on his upcoming album "Segunda Cita" (Second Date) returns the emphasis and meaning of Guevara's life to "his struggle against imperialism, his love of being a revolutionary and his concept of socialism."
- In October 2009, French alternative rock artist Manu Chao played two tribute concerts in Cuba (at Havana University and Sandino Stadium in the city of Santa Clara) to mark the 42nd anniversary Guevara's assassination. Chao was accompanied in Havana by Polish designer Jacek Wozniak, who joined several Cuban artists to paint a large mural dedicated to Che's memory.
- Song "List do Che" (literally "Letter to Che") by Polish alternative rock band Strachy na Lachy mocks the fact that capitalists make great profit from communism-oriented revolutionst's image.
- In the 2009 album Entren Los Que Quieran by Puerto Rican alternative hip hop band Calle 13, the song "El Hormiguero" contains music samples of Che Guevara's speeches and recordings of Subcomandante Marcos and Salvador Allende's voices.
- Che appeared in an episode of Epic Rap Battles of History and battled Guy Fawkes. He was portrayed by Robert Rico.

==== Songs in tribute ====
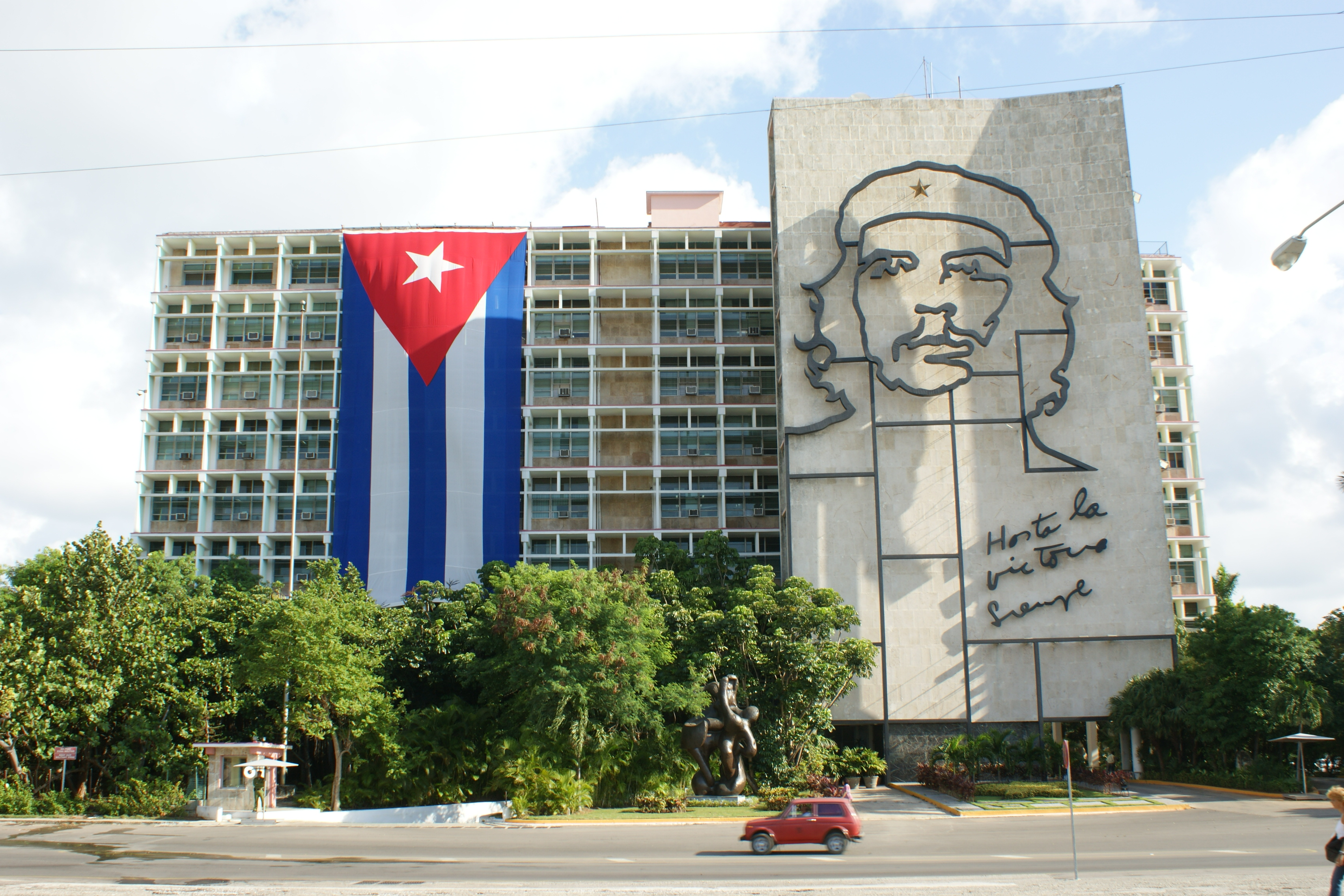
The Plaza de la Revolución in Havana, Cuba.

Che Guevara is the purest part of the Cuban Revolution. He is the symbol of the ideal of the revolution; he is the symbol of innovation. We all need change, and we need hope. He is the symbol of hope. He had Irish roots, traveled around Mexico and learned to be alone, he challenged solitude. He is the brave part of the revolution.

— Nathalie Cardone,
sang modern version of Hasta Siempre

We've considered Che a fifth band member for a long time now, for the simple reason that he exemplifies the integrity and revolutionary ideals to which we aspire.

— Tom Morello, guitarist for Rage Against the Machine

- Afro Cubanos All Stars — "Hasta Siempre Comandante"
- Ahmet Koç — "Hasta Siempre" (instrumental)
- Ali Primera — "Comandante Amigo"
- Angelo Branduardi — "1° aprile 1965"
- Biermann & Black — "Hasta Siempre Comandante Che Guevara"
- Bill Laswell — "Commander Guevara"
- Carlos Puebla — "Hasta Siempre Comandante Che Guevara"
- Chicos Nuevos — "Che Guevara Rap Cubano"
- Elena Burke — "Canción del Guerrillero Heroico"
- Francesco Guccini — "Stagioni"
- Francesco Guccini — "Canzone per il Che"
- Happoradio — "Che Guevara"
- Jorge Drexler — "Al otro lado del río"
- Ismael Serrano — "Papá cuéntame otra vez"
- Juan Carlos Biondini — "Poema al Che"
- La Mona Jiménez — "El pueblo te ama Che Guevara"
- Levellers — "Happy birthday revolution"
- Nathalie Cardone — "Hasta Siempre"
- Oktober Klub international — "Comandante Che Guevara"
- Quilapayún — "Canción funebre para el Che Guevara"
- Roberto Vecchioni — "Celia de la Serna"
- Shaikh Emam — "Guevara Mat (Guevara has died)"
- Silvio Rodríguez — "Fusil contra fusil"
- Silvio Rodríguez — "Tonada del albedrio" (Tune to Free Will)
- Soledad Bravo — "Hasta Siempre Comandante Che Guevara"
- United States of America — "Love Song for the Dead Che"
- Víctor Jara — "Zamba del Che"
- Wolf Biermann — "Comandante Che Guevara"

=== In television ===
- Che Guevara himself was a guest on Face the Nation with Tad Szulc in 1964.
- In the now canceled Fox television series Dark Angel, the main character's (Jessica Alba) assumed name is Max Guevara, a reference to Che in her quest to liberate her own race of people, as well.
- In an episode of the animated sitcom King of the Hill, Bobby's activist friend wears a Che Guevara T-shirt.
- The side character Jun Guevara in the anime Baki Hanma (based on the manga Baki the Grappler) is based on Che Guevara, being nearly identical to the real person
- In an episode of American Dad!, Stan's son is brainwashed by a communist to follow communism, after his dad ignores him. When his dad enters his room and sees communist apparel everywhere, he begins to rip them down. When he gets to a picture of Che he says "This we can agree on. Planet of the Apes was a fine picture".
- Kyle wears a Che Guevara T-shirt in the South Park episode "Die Hippie, Die".
- In the 2011 South Park episode "The Last of the Meheecans", a street vendor in Mexico is selling a stylized version of the Che t-shirt bearing the image of "Mantequilla".
- In the first season, the opening sequence of The Boondocks featured main character Huey Freeman stylized in the likeness of Che Guevara. A poster of Che Guevara was also seen in his room in the episode "The Passion of the Ruckus".
- In the anime Eureka Seven, the character Stoner resembles Che.
- In the anime Zoku Sayonara Zetsubō Sensei, Nami finds a shirt with Che Guevara's face on it and Chiri tries to give history lessons from Che in episode 12.
- In the anime series Heat Guy J, a poster of Che Guevara hangs on a wall in Daisuke's room.
- In the anime 009-1, the Plaza de la Revolución with Che Guevara's face on it appears in a background shot in episode 12.
- In That '70s Show, the character Steven Hyde often wears a Che Guevara t-shirt.
- Eric Burdon wears a Che Guevara shirt as host of the PBS special The '60s Experience.
- PBS held a forum titled 'the Legacy of Che' where they proclaimed that: "Che Guevara was a pop icon of mythic proportions."
- In The Simpsons episode "Who Shot Mr. Burns? (Part Two)", the Tito Puente's mambo club is called "Chez Guevara", a reference to Che.
- In The Simpsons episode "The Trouble With Trillions", when Homer goes to Cuba there is a wall with a mural that reads "Duffo o Muerte" (Duffo or death), which is a parody of Cuban Motto "Patria o Muerte" (Homeland or Death) and shows a picture of Che Guevara holding a can of beer.
- In The Simpsons episode "Havana Wild Weekend", the ferry they ride to Cuba is named the "Che Gue-ferry", accompanied by the famous Guerrillero Heroico portrait.
- In the Family Guy episode "Tales of Former Sports Glory", Che Guevara appears on a flashback where Cleveland and his father LeVar they had met him in person at a baseball game.
- In the Serbian television series Vratiće se rode, Švaba has a poster of Che Guevara in his bedroom.
- In the show El Gen Argentino a poll was conducted to determine if Che Guevara, amongst other figures, could be considered the greatest argentine in history.
- The Latin American Xchange, a Total Nonstop Action Wrestling tag team, show clips of Che Guevara in their entrance video.
- In the pilot episode of Mission Hill, there is a picture of Che in the background of a classroom.
- In the movie Lost and Delirious, the character Paulie has a Che Guevara poster over her bed.
- In an episode of The Venture Bros., "Dia de Los Dangerous!" Dr. Venture's "colleague" is named Ernesto Guevara.
- When British comedy and TV star Ricky Gervais (of The Office) brought out a DVD of his politics live stand-up show in 2004, he chose to represent himself on the cover as Che Guevara.
- In episode 6 of the British teen drama Skins, the character James Cook (played by Jack O'Connell) runs for class president by presenting himself mocked up as Che Guevara.
- Stephen Colbert gifted Benicio del Toro a modified Che T-shirt bearing his own image when del Toro appeared on a January 2009 broadcast of The Colbert Report, to promote the film Che.
- The 2009 ABC animated comedy The Goode Family parodies a liberal family whose dog is named "Che". Abhorring meat consumption, the Goode Family (whose car bumper also features the face of Che Guevara) force their dog Che to follow a vegan diet, which forces him to supplement his appetite by eating small creatures and neighborhood cats.
- A character on the German soap opera Lindenstraße, "Dr. Ernesto Stadler", was named (by his leftist father) after Ernesto "Che" Guevara. Both Ernesto and his brother Jimi (named after Jimi Hendrix) are quite conservative.
- While describing character Hideo Kuze in Ghost in the Shell: S.A.C. 2nd GIG, Motoko Kusanagi compares him to Che, as well as to Martin Luther King Jr., and Mohandas Gandhi.
- An episode of "Criminal Minds: Beyond Borders" aired in May 2016 and was heavily influenced by Guevara's anti-American rhetoric. Several quotes from Guevara were left at the murder scenes by the episode's spree killers.

=== In theatre ===
==== Musicals/plays ====
- In the Andrew Lloyd Webber musical, Evita, the narrator and main protagonist is a revolutionary based on Che Guevara. Though never referred to by his name "Che" in the musical itself, the character is identified as "Che" in the libretto, and in the title of one song "The Waltz for Eva and Che", wherein he cynically tells the story of Eva Perón, and the two finally confront one another during the Waltz. David Essex originated the role in London and Mandy Patinkin on Broadway (and Ricky Martin in the 2012 Broadway revival), and Antonio Banderas played it in the 1996 film version.
- Hispanic-American Marcelino Quiñonez wrote and performed a 2007 play titled El Che, about the revolutionary. The Spanish language drama portrays the human side of Guevara as a father and friend, and debuted in 2009 as part of Phoenix, Arizona's Teatro Bravo series.
- José Rivera wrote and performed a play titled School of the Americas which focuses on Che's last few hours alive. The play starring John Ortiz as Che, imagines Che's final conversations, mainly with a young and fairly naive female schoolteacher, in the one-room village schoolhouse where he is imprisoned before his execution. The play was featured in New York City 2006–2007 and later San Francisco 2008.

Other plays featuring a Che Guevara character include:

- Guerrillas, by Rolf Hochhuth, production: 1970
- Che Guevara, written by Zhang Guangtian, productions: 2007 Beijing China, 2008 China Art Institute.

==== Opera ====
- In 1969 a Dutch opera premièred at the Theater Carré titled Reconstructie. Een moraliteit. The project was the collective work of the well known Dutch and Belgian composers and writers Reinbert de Leeuw, Harry Mulisch, Peter Schat, Hugo Claus, Louis Andriessen, and Misha Mengelberg. Inspired by Mozart's Don Giovanni, the opera mostly deals with Che's Bolivian period and then shortly after Guevara's portrayed assassination, workers slowly re-construct a huge statue of Guevara on stage.

==== Oratorio ====
- The German avant-garde composer Hans Werner Henze created a requiem about Guevara, Das Floß der Medusa (The Raft of Medusa). It was produced in Hamburg, 1968. Notwithstanding the participation of famous singers like Dietrich Fischer-Dieskau and Edda Moser it caused a scandal, complete with scuffles and police repression. Since, it has been repeatedly staged (and recorded) successfully, i.a. by the conductor Simon Rattle.

== In fashion ==
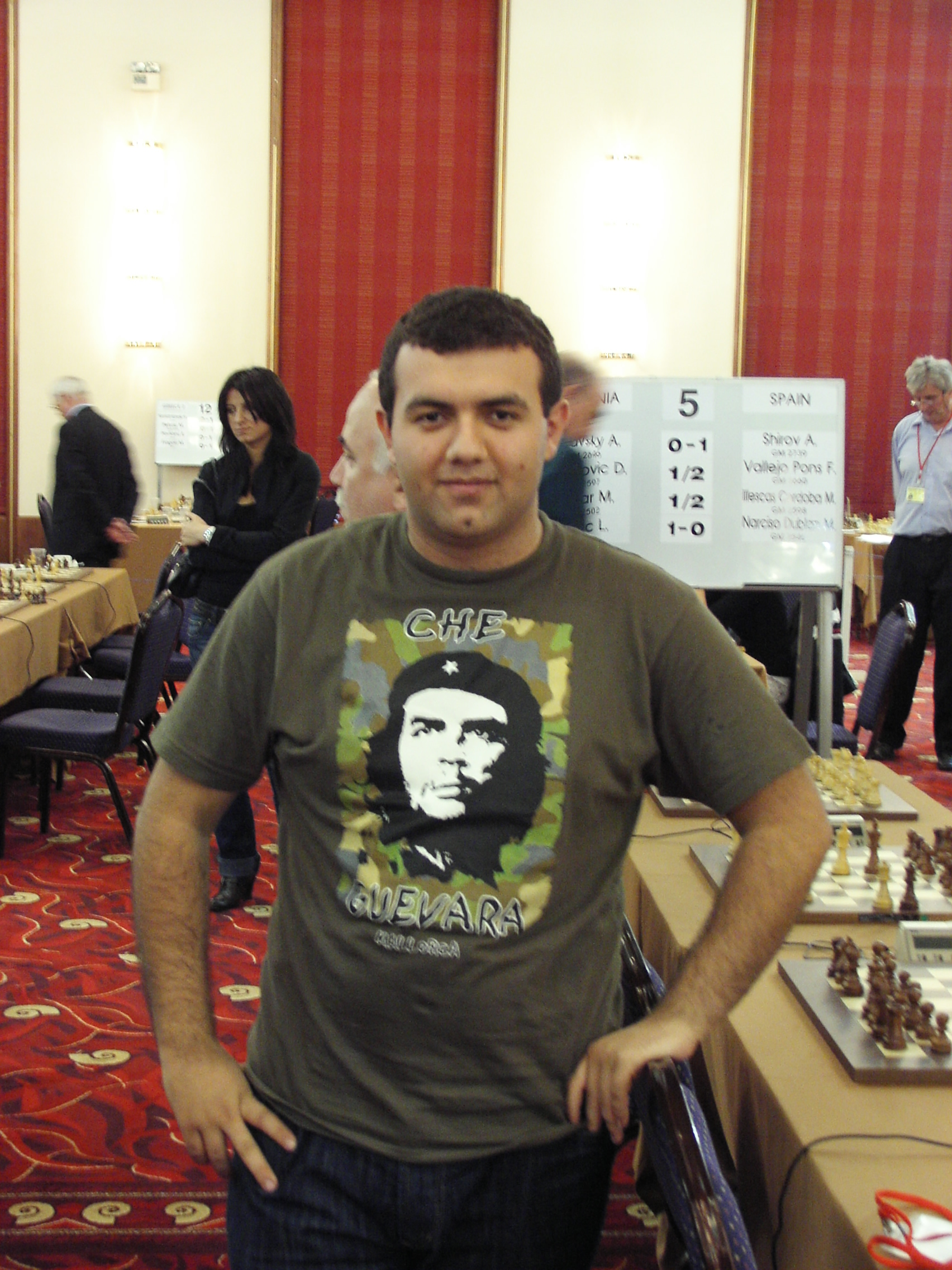
Rauf Mamedov, the Azerbaijani chess Grandmaster, in a Che t-shirt.

I don't want people to use my father's face unthinkingly. I don't like to see him stitched on the backside of a pair of mass-produced jeans. But look at the people who wear Che T-shirts. They tend to be those who don't conform, who want more from society, who are wondering if they can be better human beings. That, I think he would have liked.

— Aleida Guevara, daughter of Che Guevara

=== In celebrity fashion ===
- In Jay-Z's 2001 MTV Unplugged performance, the rapper wore a Che Guevara shirt. He later rapped in his 2003 song "Public Service Announcement": "I'm like Che Guevara with bling on".
- Madonna Singer songwriter, dressed in costume
- Cristina Fernández de Kirchner Argentinian leader, wore t-shirt
- Carlos Santana Songwriter, most memorable hit Black Magic Woman by Fleetwood Mac
- Ricky Gervais British comedian, wore t-shirt. Gervais says: "I wasn't political six months ago, and now there's nothing else in the world but politics," the Brit, 55, admitted. "I honestly haven't felt this way since I was 16 and wearing Che Guevara T-shirts, and protesting against nuclear weapons."
- Behati Prinsloo Victoria's Secret model, wore t-shirt
- Gisele Bündchen Married to Tom Brady, modeled Che Guevara bikini
- Supermodel Gisele Bündchen donned a bikini adorned with Che Guevara's image for the São Paulo fashion week in July 2002.
- During the October 7, 2002, Vanity Fair photo shoot of the Osbourne family by Annie Leibovitz, son Jack Osbourne is wearing a Che Guevara t-shirt.
- Model/actress Elizabeth Hurley was spotted in 2004 clubbing in London with a $4,500 Che-embroidered Louis Vuitton handbag.
- In 2004, the New York Public Library's gift shop featured a Che Guevara watch. The ad for the watch stated: "Revolution is a permanent state with this clever watch, featuring the classic romantic image of Che Guevara, around which the word 'revolution'-revolves."
- Actor Johnny Depp wears a pendant of Che Guevara around his neck, as can be seen on the February 2005 cover of Rolling Stone. He has also been seen wearing his t-shirt
- Prince Harry was spotted in July 2006 adorning a Che Guevara t-shirt, leading London tabloids to proclaim him "Havana Henry".

People wear the image for all kinds of reasons. To some, Che is saint-like. People quote from his writings and aspire to his belief systems. To others it's a generic symbol of rebellion, anti-establishment. And for many, the image has become so diluted, it's just a hip and cool looking t-shirt. A lot of younger people don't even know who it is they are wearing across their chests. We live in a culture today where understanding symbols doesn't necessarily matter.

— Trisha Ziff,
producer of the 2008 documentary Chevolution
- In June 2010, Che's daughter Aleida Guevara, opined at a two-day Che related conference in Vancouver, British Columbia, Canada, that the "ubiquitous exploitation" of Che Guevara's image on t-shirts and paraphernalia would have made her revolutionary father laugh, while joking that "He probably would have been delighted to see his face on the breasts of so many beautiful women."
- A store called La La Ling in Los Angeles sells a Che Guevara onesie for babies and love-sleeve tee for kids.
- The Onion offers a satirical shirt with Che Guevara himself wearing a Che Guevara shirt. The accompanying sardonic advertisement refers to the "iconic" image as "scarcely seen" since the days when Guevara "freed thousands from the restrictive yoke of T-shirt selection."
- The international retail store Urban Outfitters offers a "Che Cigar" graphic t-shirt, featuring a famous photo of the guerrilla smoking. The item is marketed with the accompanying tag line "kick back with a smoke with Che Guevara."
- The Italian company Belstaff offers a "Trialmaster Che Guevara replica jacket", a wax cotton, 4 pocket, belted, classic motorcycle jacket – offered as "a perfect replica" of the one worn by a youthful Ernesto Guevara during his famous motorcycle journey across Latin America.

== In politics ==
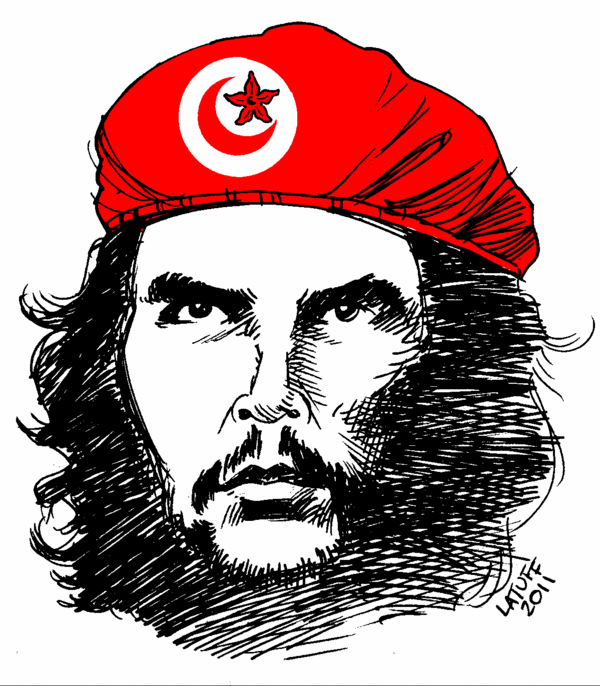
A political cartoon on the 2011 Tunisian revolution by Carlos Latuff depicting Guevara with the Tunisian flag on his beret.

=== Political imagery ===
The guy's face is shorthand for "I'm against the status quo." He's politics' answer to James Dean, a rebel with a very specific cause.

— David Segal, The Washington Post

- In February 2008, an internet-based controversy emerged when a local news report in Houston, Texas, featured the independently funded office of Cuban-American Maria Isabel, a volunteer staffer for the then Barack Obama presidential campaign. Some conservatives and Obama political opponents were angered when the clip portrayed that Isabel had used a large Cuban flag superimposed with the image of Che Guevara to decorate her office. For his part, Obama addressed the issue and called the flag's presence "inappropriate".
- In July 2008, Colombian secret agents posing as leftist rebels were able to rescue Ingrid Betancourt and 15 other hostages held by FARC guerrillas. Part of the ruse involved the agents posing as fellow rebels by wearing Che Guevara t-shirts (considered a heroic figure by the Marxist inspired insurgents).
- During a November 2008 interview with Congolese rebel leader Laurent Nkunda, he disclosed that a band of his rebels refer to themselves as the "Group of Che" and insist on wearing Che Guevara t-shirts as their uniform.

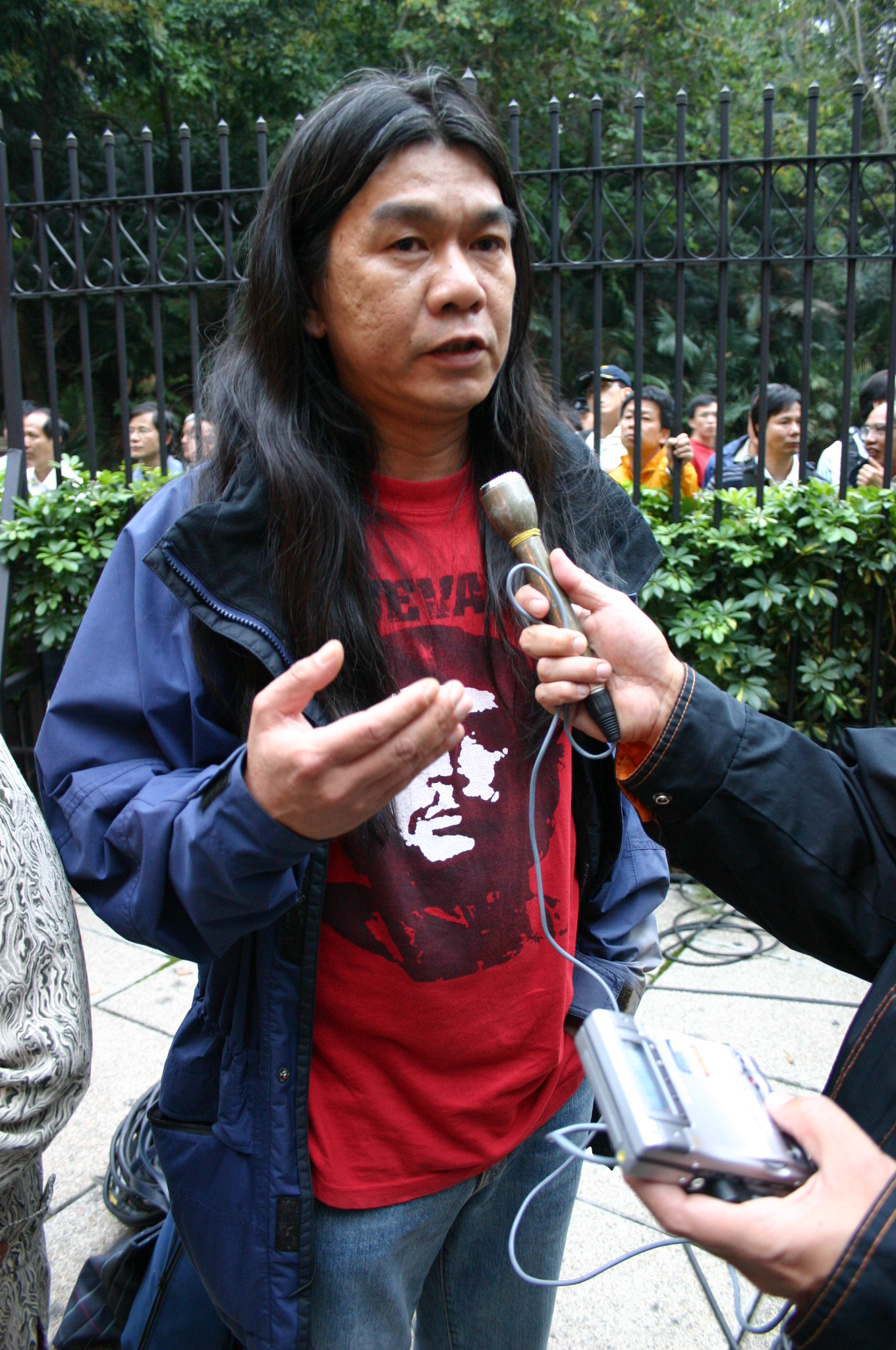
Leung Kwok-hung.

- Hong Kong legislator and activist Leung Kwok-hung aka "Long Hair", exclusively wears his trademark Che Guevara t-shirts during his numerous protests.
- Street artist Shepard Fairey, has stated that when he designed the two-tone red and blue stylized portrait of then presidential candidate Barack Obama, his "inspiration" was Alberto Korda's portrait of Che Guevara.
- In April 2009, Poland's equality minister, Elzbieta Radziszewska, proposed an amendment to the present Polish law prohibiting the production of "fascist" and "totalitarian propaganda". Critics of the addition worry that it could extend to punish those wearing the popular Che Guevara t-shirts or CCCP (USSR) jackets. If passed, many of Communism's leading figures (and thus presumably Che) would have their images outlawed for public use, with those guilty facing a two-year prison sentence.
- The May 2009 issue of Paper magazine featured a portfolio of ideas on how to rebrand the USA. One campaign by Alex Bogusky of Crispin Porter & Bogusky showed President Barack Obama wearing a T-shirt on which there is the familiar image of Che Guevara – altered to show Guevara wearing a T-shirt bearing the famous Shepard Fairey portrait of Mr. Obama and the word "Hope."

=== Political praise ===
Despite the spectacularization of the image of Che, what remains compelling are the many instances worldwide which the photograph persists as a rallying point for political struggles. To articulate resistance, to define local rebellions, to announce solidarity with others, activist artists will undoubtedly continue to remake, reclaim and recontextualize Korda's photograph.

— Brian Wallis, International Center of Photography

- Cuban school children begin every day of class with a salute and pledge of: "We will be like Che!"
- Former South African President Nelson Mandela in 1991 on a visit to Havana declared that: "Che's life is an inspiration for every human being who loves freedom. We will always honor his memory."
- American civil rights activist Jesse Jackson, in a 1984 visit to the University of Havana declared: "Long live our cry of freedom. Long Live Che!"
- One week before his own assassination on October 15, 1987, in a speech marking the 20th anniversary of Guevara's execution, Burkina Faso's revolutionary leader Thomas Sankara (himself coined "Africa's Che") declared: "ideas cannot be killed, ideas never die."

What explains the Che mania? Guevara's allure seems to stem, rather, from a nostalgic longing for the pure, uncompromising ideals of the past. In a world of ferocious competition and consumerism, some element of humanity is still looking for a hero with values. In Che, they have a paradigm: a man who was absolutely honest, completely selfless, constantly perfecting his personality.

— Orlando Borrego, close friend of Che's in Cuba, 1997
- Former Cuban leader Fidel Castro (who fought alongside Che during the Cuban revolution) proclaimed that Guevara was "a flower prematurely cut from its stem" who "sowed the seeds of social conscience in Latin America and the world." He also remarked that Che's "luminous gaze of a prophet has become a symbol for all the poor" and that "today he is in every place, wherever there is a just cause to defend."
- Former Venezuelan President Hugo Chávez performed several symbolic acts of solidarity with Guevara, which included laying a wreath in remembrance of the 40th anniversary of his death at his Mausoleum, naming a state-funded adult education programme "Misión Che Guevara", and granting doctors of the Venezuelan public health system a 60 percent pay raise in "honor of Che", who was a physician.
- After winning President of Bolivia in 2006, Evo Morales installed a portrait of Che Guevara made from coca leaves in the presidential palace. At a ceremony the following year marking the 40th anniversary of his execution, Morales declared "the ideals and actions of Commander Ernesto Guevara are examples for those who defend equality and justice. We are humanists and followers of the example of Guevara."

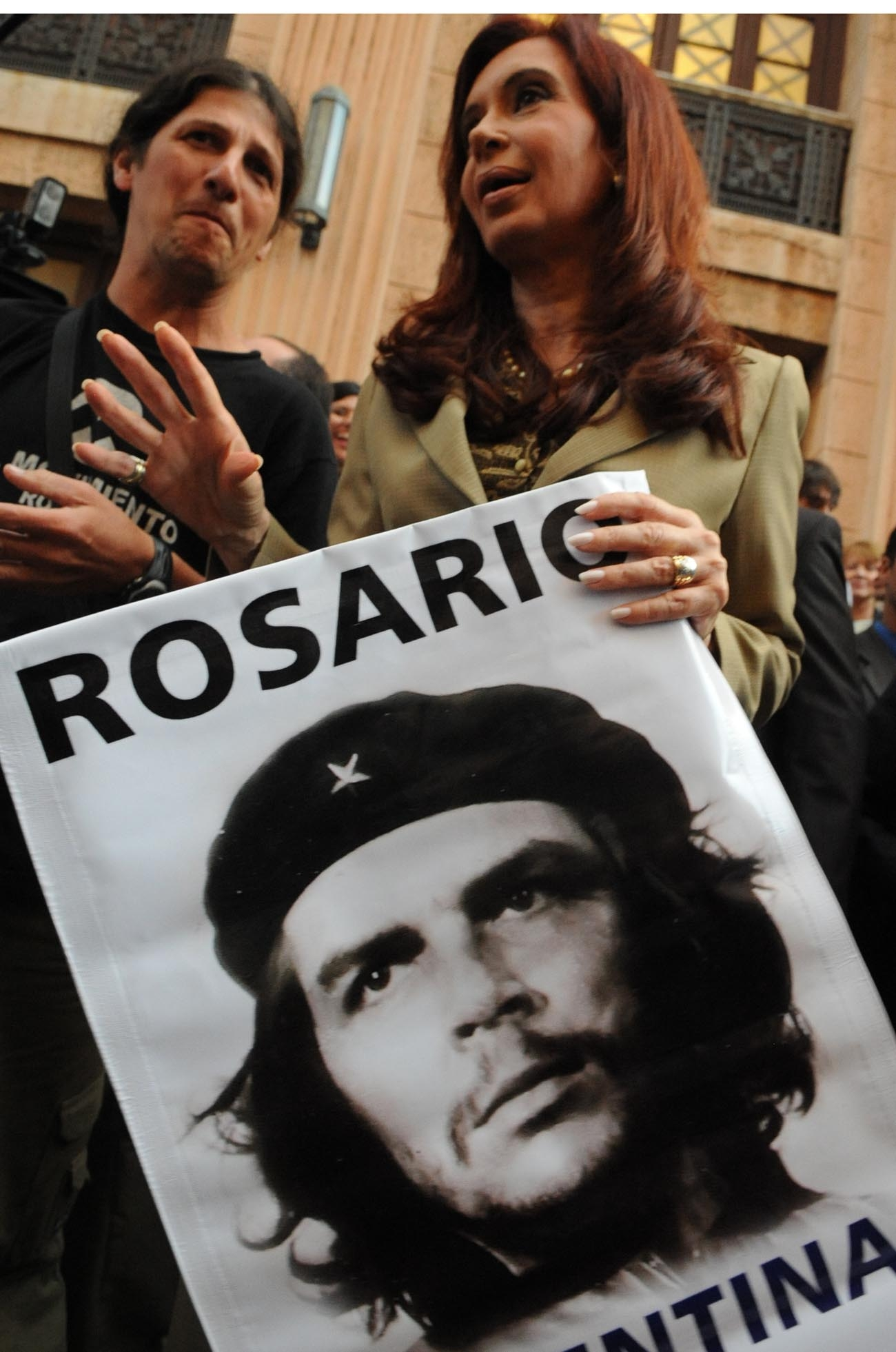
President of Argentina, Cristina Kirchner, holding a poster of Guevara. She has remarked that "Che is a man who fought unconditionally for his ideas and died for them."

- In October 2007, Irish Republicans in Derry, Northern Ireland and Sinn Féin organized a weekend celebration on the "life and legacy" of Irish-Argentine Che Guevara. The weekend featured numerous events including a meeting on freeing the "Cuban Five" and a youth discussion in Pilots Row, while concluding with the unveiling of a new Che Guevara mural in the Bogside.
- On November 9, 2007, the British House of Commons held an early day motion proposed by John McDonnell and signed by 27 other members of parliament which read: "This House notes that 9 October marks the 40th anniversary of the murder of Ernesto Che Guevara in Bolivia; further notes the inspiration that Che Guevara has brought to national liberation movements and millions of socialists around the world; and believes that the sustained social gains of the Cuban revolution and the government of Evo Morales in Bolivia are fitting tributes to his legacy."
- After attending a private screening of Steven Soderbergh's 2008 biographical film Che, British politician George Galloway professed that "no one could be more alive – his image, his example, his spirit, is abroad in every struggle throughout the world." Galloway ended his praise by stating that "Guevara radiates out from the photos a goodness, with the power to move millions forever."
- In September 2009, Croatian President Stjepan Mesić visited and placed a wreath at Che's grave site in Santa Clara, Cuba. Afterwards during his remarks President Mesic referred to Guevara as "a symbol of struggle and an example for young people who wanted a better and more just society", before noting that "Che Guevara's ideals have transcended Latin America's borders, he has become an example for all who are dreaming about a better world."

== In religion ==
=== "Saint Ernesto" in Bolivia ===
It's like he is alive and with us, like a friend. He is kind of like a Virgin Mary for us. We say, "Che, help us with our work or with this planting", and it always goes well.

— Manuel Cortez, a campesino who resides next to the schoolhouse where Guevara was executed

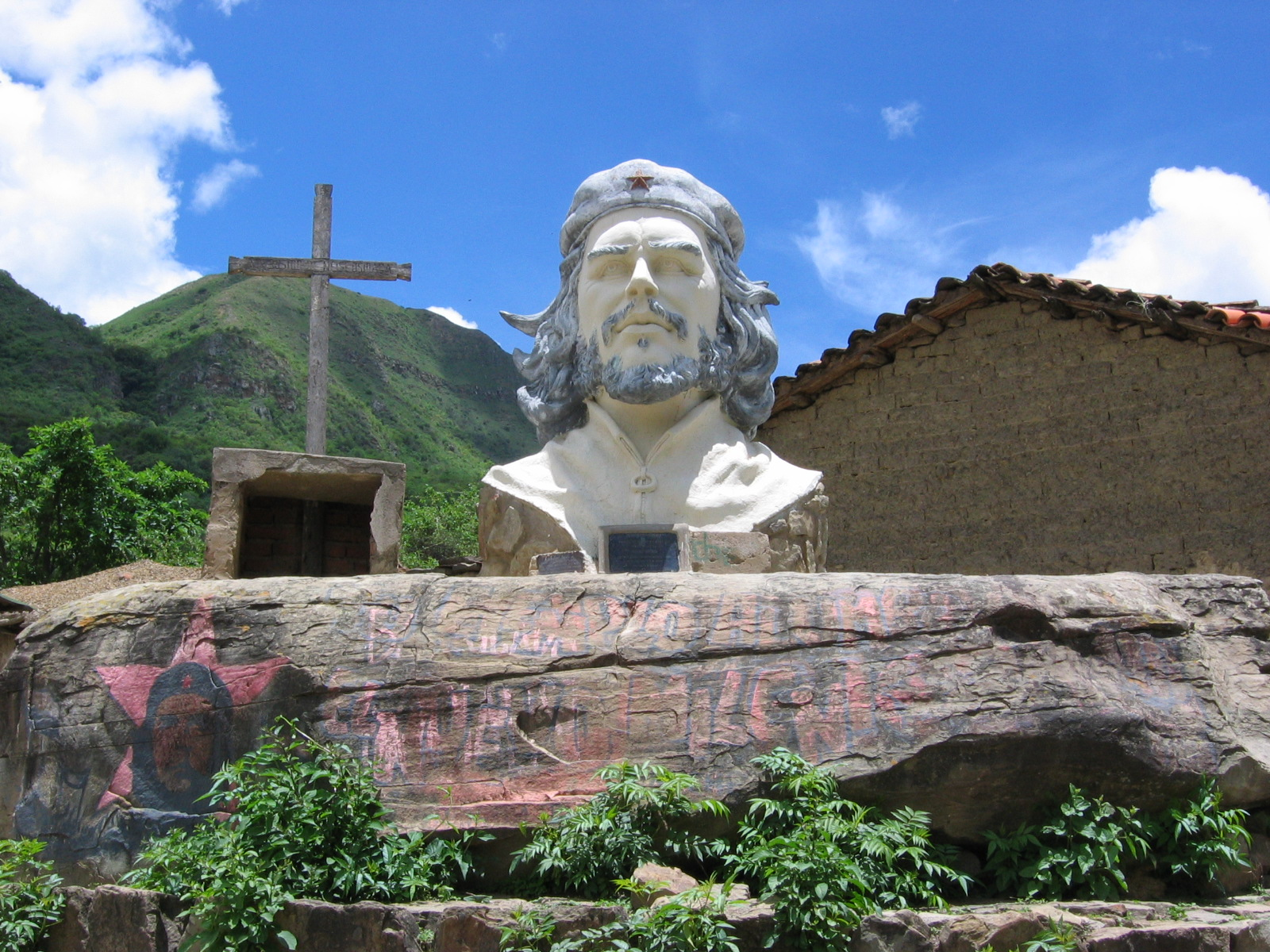
A memorial site in La Higuera, Bolivia, where Che Guevara was executed on October 9, 1967.

Che Guevara's unlikely transformation into a "sanctified" figure began immediately after his execution.

Folk saint Ernesto of La Higuera
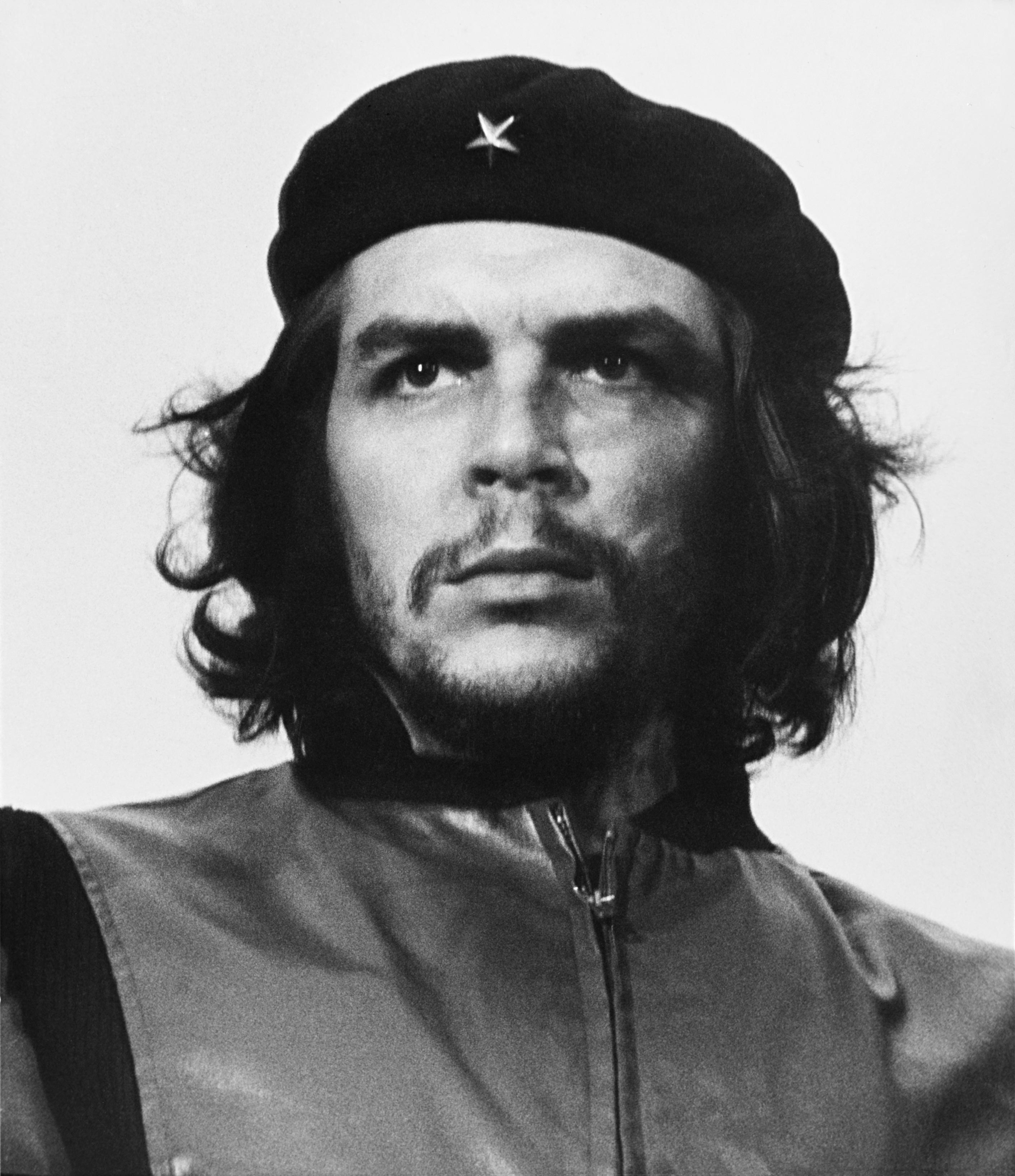

Saint
- Died: 9 October 1967 (aged 39); La Higuera, Santa Cruz, Bolivia
- Cause of death: Extrajudicial killing
- Honored in: Catholic Church in Bolivia (Non-official, folk saint)
- Patronage: La Higuera, sick people, lost animals

Susana Osinaga, the nurse who cleaned Guevara's corpse after his execution reminisced that locals saw an uncanny physical resemblance to the popularized artistic portrayals of Jesus. According to Osinaga, "he was just like a Christ, with his strong eyes, his beard, his long hair", adding that in her view he was "very miraculous." Jon Lee Anderson, author of Che Guevara: A Revolutionary Life, notes how among the hospital's nuns, and a number of Vallegrande women, the impression that Guevara bore an extraordinary resemblance to Jesus Christ quickly spread; leading them to surreptitiously clip off clumps of his long hair and keep them for good luck. Jorge G. Castañeda, author of Compañero: The Life and Death of Che Guevara, discerns that "the Christ-like image prevailed" stating "it's as if the dead Guevara looks on his killers and forgives them, and upon the world, proclaiming that he who dies for an idea is beyond suffering."

Eleven days after Guevara's execution, journalist I. F. Stone (who himself had interviewed Guevara), drew the comparison by noting that "with his curly reddish beard, he looked like a cross between a faun and a Sunday-school print of Jesus." That observation was followed by German artist and playwright Peter Weiss' remark that the post-mortem images of Guevara resembled a "Christ taken down from the cross." Che's last moments and the connection to Christian iconography was also noted by David Kunzle, author of the book Che Guevara: Icon, Myth, and Message, who analogized the last photo of Guevara alive, with his hands bound, to an "Ecce Homo."

In August 1968, French intellectual Régis Debray, who was captured in Bolivia while living with Che Guevara, gave a jailhouse interview where he also drew the comparison. According to Debray, Che (an atheist) "was a mystic without a transcendent belief, a saint without a God." Debray went on to tell interviewer Marlene Nadle of Ramparts magazine that "Che was a modern Christ, but I think he suffered a much harder passion. The Christ of 2,000 years ago died face-to-face with his God. But Che knew there was no God and that after his death nothing remains."

Che's appeal is emotional. His death in Bolivia as a relatively young man created Che as secular Christ, the man who took upon himself the sins of the world and gave his life for the cause of the oppressed. His memory remains available to the oppressed; his image continues to inspire the hope of change and the virtue of rebellion, enhanced rather than diminished by his defeat. Christ, too, was defeated on earth and, again like Christ, Che's death conveys a promise of redemption through inspiration.

— Isabel Hilton, New Statesman

Beginning with the 30th anniversary of Che's death, as Western reporters returned to Bolivia to report on commemorations, they began to notice that Che Guevara had been transfigured and "canonized" by the local Bolivian campesinos. No longer was he Che Guevara the guerrilla insurgent, but he was now viewed as a "Saint" by locals who had come to refer to him as "San Ernesto de La Higuera" (Saint Ernesto of La Higuera). Accompanying his "Sainthood" came prayers for favors and legends of his ghost still walking the area. This prompted the development of the 2006 film San Ernesto de la Higuera produced by Isabel Santos, which won best short documentary at the 5th International Film Festival of Human Rights.

As the 40th anniversary of Che's execution approached in 2007, journalists returned to discover that in Bolivia, images of Che now hung next to images of Jesus, the Virgin Mary, and Pope John Paul II. Additionally, columnist Christopher Roper observed that "in Bolivia, Che's murdered body was now compared to John the Baptist, while Reuters reported that in many homes, Che's face competed for wall space with a host of saints of the Catholic Church. A new legend also became known, when the Los Angeles Times reported that some rural campesinos now believed that if you whisper Che Guevara's name to the sky or light a candle to his memory, you will find your lost goat or cow.

A host of local campesinos went on record to journalists from The Guardian about this phenomenon as well. Melanio Moscoso, of La Higuera stated "we pray to him, we are so proud he had died here, in La Higuera, fighting for us. We feel him so close", while Freddy Vallejos, of Vallegrande, proclaimed "we have a faith, a confidence in Che. When I go to bed and when I wake up, I first pray to God and then I pray to Che – and then, everything is all right. Che's presence here is a positive force. I feel it in my skin, I have faith that always, at all times, he has an eye on us." Remi Calzadilla, a resident of Pucara, claimed that praying to Che had helped him regain the ability to walk, adding that "now every time I speak to Che I feel a strong force inside of me."

The laundry where Guevara's corpse was displayed to the world's press in Vallegrande is now a place of pilgrimage as well, with hundreds of personal messages transcribed and carved into the surrounding walls from admiring visitors. In large letters above the table where Che's dead body once lay, an engraving now reads "None dies as long as he is remembered."

=== Outside Bolivia ===
The resemblance to aspects of Christ's life on earth can be easily traced in the life of Che. Both were doctors – Christ as miracle healer, Che as the trained physician, and were active as such, even or especially so when they were fighting, doctoring when others were resting or escaping. Both men were particularly concerned with leprosy, the disease of the downtrodden and outcast, as The Motorcycle Diaries (books and film) have reminded us in the case of Che. Like Che, Jesus was an egalitarian, a communist in terms of owning little and sharing all, and his disciples were bidden to hold all in common. Both were strict disciplinarians, who insisted on individuals leaving families, friends and privileges behind to join them, sacrificing comforts and, if need be, their own lives.

— David Kunzle, author of Che Guevara: Icon, Myth, and Message

The international reception of the struggle of Che Guevara, who was killed in 1967, soon expanded beyond the borders of Bolivia. Research on the Latin American memory, according to Latin American scholar Eric Zolov, shows how the eventual defeat of the guerrillas of Guevara ironically contributed to his worldwide image, leading to the growth of the image of the “trans-national hero of rebellion” who surpass borders because the meaning of his image is clear, writes Zolov, “no matter who one is or from where one comes”. Soon, the image of the fallen revolutionary was taken up by the international press, youth, or political circles on the continents of Europe, Asia, and Africa to represent the universal symbol of defiance against imperialism.

Simultaneously, in Western Europe, the death of Guevara was part of the wave of protest movements, which found in his biography an ideal for moral dissent. The French student revolts of 1968 took his name on their banners, spanning the meaning of defiance against authority. In Italy, “leftist youth groups distributed leaflets with his portrait, urging the conscience of the world to side with the Third World,” while in West Germany, the same happened, symbolizing the conscience of youth against the selfishness of the world of commodities that European youth had difficulty accepting, according to Zolov and Vania Markarian, who talk about the “migration of symbols” from Latin America, offering an emotional collection to the world of the sixties across the globe.

In Latin America itself, the memory of Guevara was divided between national celebrations and popular uses, with governments like the one in Mexico disapproving of guerrilla warfare as state policy but allowing the publication of works that celebrated the moral integrity of the icon, often with tie-ins to his last campaign that criticized national inequalities instead. According to author Kristin Dykstra, “The Special Period of the 1990s in Cuba saw artists turn once again to the image of Che, this time to show the decline of the revolution’s utopian ideals, his face acting as the screen onto which the anxieties of the society are projected.” In “Outside Bolivia,” then, the meaning of “Outside” relates to more than geographical location, but also the ideological areas “where the interpretation of the meaning of Che is still in play.”

However, the image of Guevara took on a different trajectory in the United States. The image was used in the 1970s in student movements against the Vietnam War, then in campaigns for Latin American solidarity. The portrait was everywhere in college rooms and community centers throughout the world, proclaiming Third World defiance. According to cultural critic Florence Babb, “this particular American fascination with the image of Guevara indicates the paradox of political consumption, wherein the same image, the same icon, could signify both subversive political statement and fashion”. The face on the poster or T-shirt was “younger people’s way of acting out defiance on the cheap, or on the cheapening terms of capitalism,” describes García Canclini in his concept of “hybrid cultural practices” that combine resistance with capital logic.

However, from the 1980s to the 1990s, the commercial design community in London, New York, and Tokyo began to produce the Guerrillero Heroico image on a mass scale. Simultaneously, the image was taken up anew in the Global South by activists who insisted on its relevance to their own struggles.

Sandinistas in Nicaragua,Anti-apartheid activists in South Africa, Palestine youth movements, among others, took up Guevaras image in propaganda posters bearing the banner of standing in solidarity with the struggles against colonialism, racism, or imperialism. The AK47-wielding, beret-sporting militant had become shorthand for resistance, his trans political appeal spanning several liberation struggles.

The ability of the icon to “transcend biography” gives the “Che” image its meaning as an image of justice, writes Franz Weiser in 2013, referring to the Guerrillero Heroico photograph, taken by Alberto Korda, of the Argentine rebel icon Ernesto “Che” Guevara

The myth was also expanded by the film music of popular culture, while stage plays, operas, and music pieces about Guevara, according to Robert Adlington, “employ quotation and irony to probe the frontiers between political commitment and the commodification of revolution." However, other Latin American rock bands, inspired by the “Nueva Canción” movement, composed songs about Guevara, portraying the Cuban icon as the ethical beacon of hope for the “post-dictatorship” generation in Argentina, Chile, and Uruguay, extending the revolution to the music world.

Tourism also contributed to the spread of the fame of the Cuban leader to other countries beyond Bolivia. Starting from the 1990s, tourists from European countries, North America, among others, visited the nation of Cuba, looking for vestiges of the “revolutionary” past. According to Babb, the “mausoleum of the charismatic leader” located in Santa Clara was “simultaneously a site of pilgrimage” and “incorporated into the Cuban tourism circuit.” They brought home souvenirs featuring his face, coffee cups, caps, or even keychains, to show their devotion or nostalgia for the fallen leader, an element referred to by Babb (2011) as the “consumption of memory” that shows “political ideals persist into commodified forms” in agreement with “the capitalizing practices of markets.” To many Cuban vendors or tourists, Guevara was more than just the face of the revolution, but also the “

“Outside of Bolivia, the longevity of the image of Che Guevara is the result of complex relationships between politics, art, and commercialism,” writes Justin Akka Barker, who observes, “Outside of Bolivia, there are three main interpretations that academic literature recognizes.” The three interpretations are: “The aesthetics of the photograph are simple, allowing for its reproduction across different formats,” because the photograph taken by Korda was aesthetically simple, meaning the image was easily reproducible. Print-quality, without much of a loss of quality, being simple in design, with minimum complexity, for the same price anywhere in the world, “The moral attributes of Guevara, his notions of discipline, sacrifice, and opposition to imperialism,” because the image of Guevara was morally strong, meaning the photograph represented morally strong attributes, i.e., the attributes of discipline, sacrifice, and opposition to imperialism, because “the markets of the late twentieth century converted the moral capital of the image of Guevara into its currency.” The effect, according to Pablo Zolov, “The symbol contains its own contradictions.” It is both the face on the anti-regime banner as well as on the souvenir shirts, a contradictory symbol of both defiance against capitalist exploitation as well as a product of the same capitalist systems it defies, being one of the most successful products derived from it. The contradiction within the image, as opposed to weakening it, has instead contributed to its survival. The complexity of the image, as Zolov further explains in 2014, lies within the contradictions contained within the symbol, allowing it to be labeled to practically any cause.

- The Church of England caused some controversy in 1999, when they drew comparisons of Jesus to Che Guevara on a red and black poster titled "Che Jesus", which bore the slogan: "Meek. Mild. As if. Discover the real Jesus." In response to the controversy Reverend Peter Owens-Jones of the Church Advertising Network (CAN) who designed the ad stated "We are not saying that Jesus was communist, but that he was revolutionary. We are exploiting the image of revolution, not the image of Che Guevara."
- Che Guevara appears as the Christ figure in a mural called "The Last Supper of Chicano Heroes" in Stanford University's Latino Dorm (Casa Zapata).
- Actor Benicio del Toro who played Guevara in the 2008 biographical film Che, compared the guerrilla leader to Jesus Christ, stating "I think Che had perseverance and morality ... being the underdog and fighting against injustice and standing up for the forgotten moved him so hard. Kind of like Jesus, in a way – only Jesus would turn the other cheek. Che wouldn't."

=== "Curse of Che" ===
Many of the rural campesinos in the small Bolivian town of Vallegrande, where anthropologists retrieved Che's remains in 1997, firmly believe that there exists a "curse of Che". This belief exists because six of the Bolivian politicians and military officers who share responsibility for Guevara's death have since died a violent death. They were murdered, died in accidents, or in the case of Bolivian President René Barrientos were killed in a helicopter crash. In addition, General Gary Prado, who arrested Guevara, became paralyzed after a shot went off from a gun he was handling and hit his spine.

== In sport ==
I see a direct link between Che's love of rugby and our love of rugby and his desire to see change and our desire to see change. Of course his crusade involved overturning corrupt government, changing society and fights to the death – ours is simply to prove we are worthy rugby players who deserve to be treated equally. He was an Argentinian rugby man through and through and we are proud to number him among our predecessors. I like to think he would enjoy the strides we have made.

— Agustín Pichot, captain of the Argentina national rugby union team

- During a match, footballer Cristiano Lucarelli scored a goal for the Italy national football team and stripped off his Azzurri shirt to reveal a t-shirt bearing the image of Che Guevara. The move identified him strongly with his then favorite and now current team Livorno, whose supporters brandish left-wing paraphernalia at matches to celebrate the city's long tradition of socialism.
- Boxing champion Floyd Mayweather Jr. wore a Che t-shirt during one installment of his 2009 HBO series Mayweather–Márquez 24/7".
- The Hapoel Tel Aviv Football Club, considered the "standard bearer of the Israeli left", utilizes the image of Che Guevara in an array of ways. At home matches, fans unroll banners emblazoned with the face of Che Guevara.
- Fans of Celtic F.C. in Glasgow, a team heavily associated with Irish Republicanism, use Che Guevara's image in a number of ways, especially on flags. Often reference is made to Che Guevara's Irish ancestry. In 2008, the Black County Celtic Supporters Club became known as the Black Country Che Guevara Celtic Supporters Club.

== In tourism ==
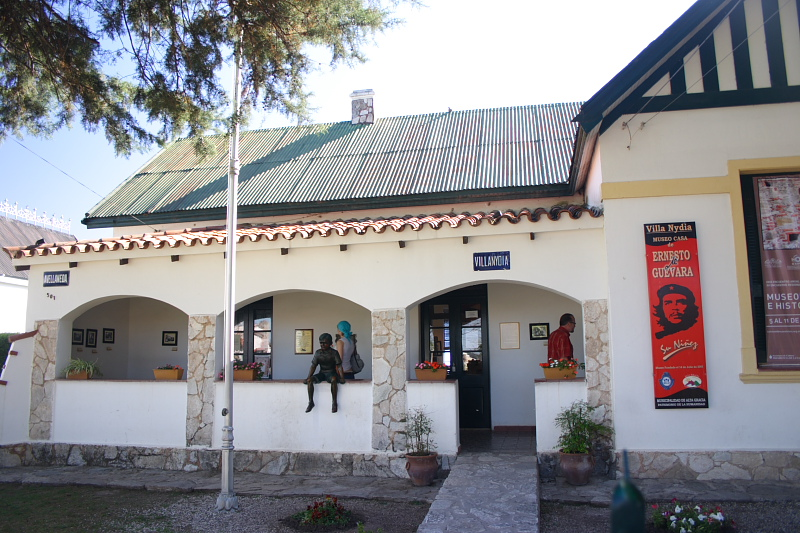
Guevara's childhood home in Alta Gracia, Argentina, which is now a museum.

With the recent and euphoric globalization, the image of Che prevails as an activist icon amongst many in the Western World. Within the indigenous Zapatistas in Chiapas, the image of Che blends in with that of Christ, Virgin Mary, truck drivers, vendettas, taggers, commercialists, popular musicians, and gangsters of Mexico and other countries. These people wear him as an accent on their clothing and stickers on their vehicles, as if the image still maintained its primitive innocence.

— Rogelio Villarreal, editor-in-chief of Replicante

- Bolivia features a 'Che Guevara Trail' which is overseen by Care Bolivia and the Bolivian Ministry of Tourism. The trail leads by road from the Bolivian city of Santa Cruz de la Sierra, via the Inca site of Samaipata, onto the villages of Vallegrande and La Higuera (the 'holy grail' for Che pilgrims). The tour allows visitors to travel just as Che and his comrades did – by mule or on foot through rocky forested terrain – or in four-wheel-drive vehicles along unpaved roads. The trail visits places of historical interest including the site of Che's guerrilla camp, the school where after 11 months as a guerrilla he was captured and killed, and his former grave. Visitors also are able to meet local people who met or traveled with Guevara.
- Cuba also offers a '14-day "Che Guevara Tour", (organized in collaboration with the Ernesto Che Guevara center in Havana) – which allows travelers to follow the historical footsteps of Che Guevara in his guerrilla struggle to oust Cuban dictator Fulgencio Batista.
- Journey Latin America, offers a three-week escorted Motorcycle Diaries tour from Buenos Aires to Lima. The company also offers tailor-made trips to any of the locations along the Guevara-Granado route.
- The Cuevas de los Portales (Portales Caverns) Caves, located within Guira National Park in Cuba's westernmost province of Pinar del Río, features Guevara's headquarters during the 1962 Cuban Missile Crisis. His original table, chairs, and iron bed still remain in the cave, which is open to visitors.

=== Monuments and memorials ===
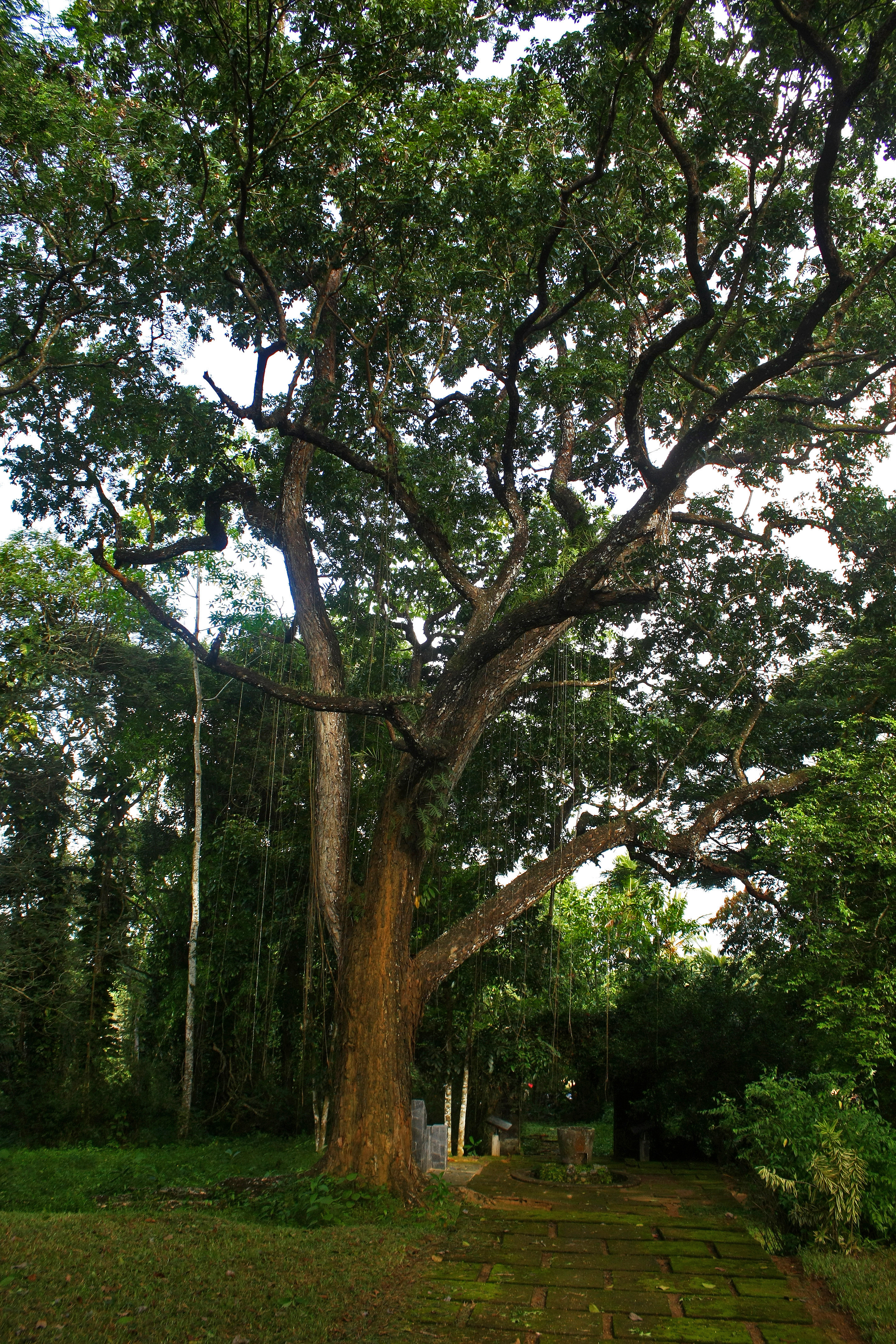
"This is the only surviving tree in the world that has been planted by Che Guevara" in Yahala Kele rubber estate in Moragahahena, Horana, Sri Lanka on August 8, 1959

Guevara is everywhere. He is being reborn. And nowadays, he has won. You will see.

— Eladio Gonzalez, Che memorabilia store owner in Buenos Aires

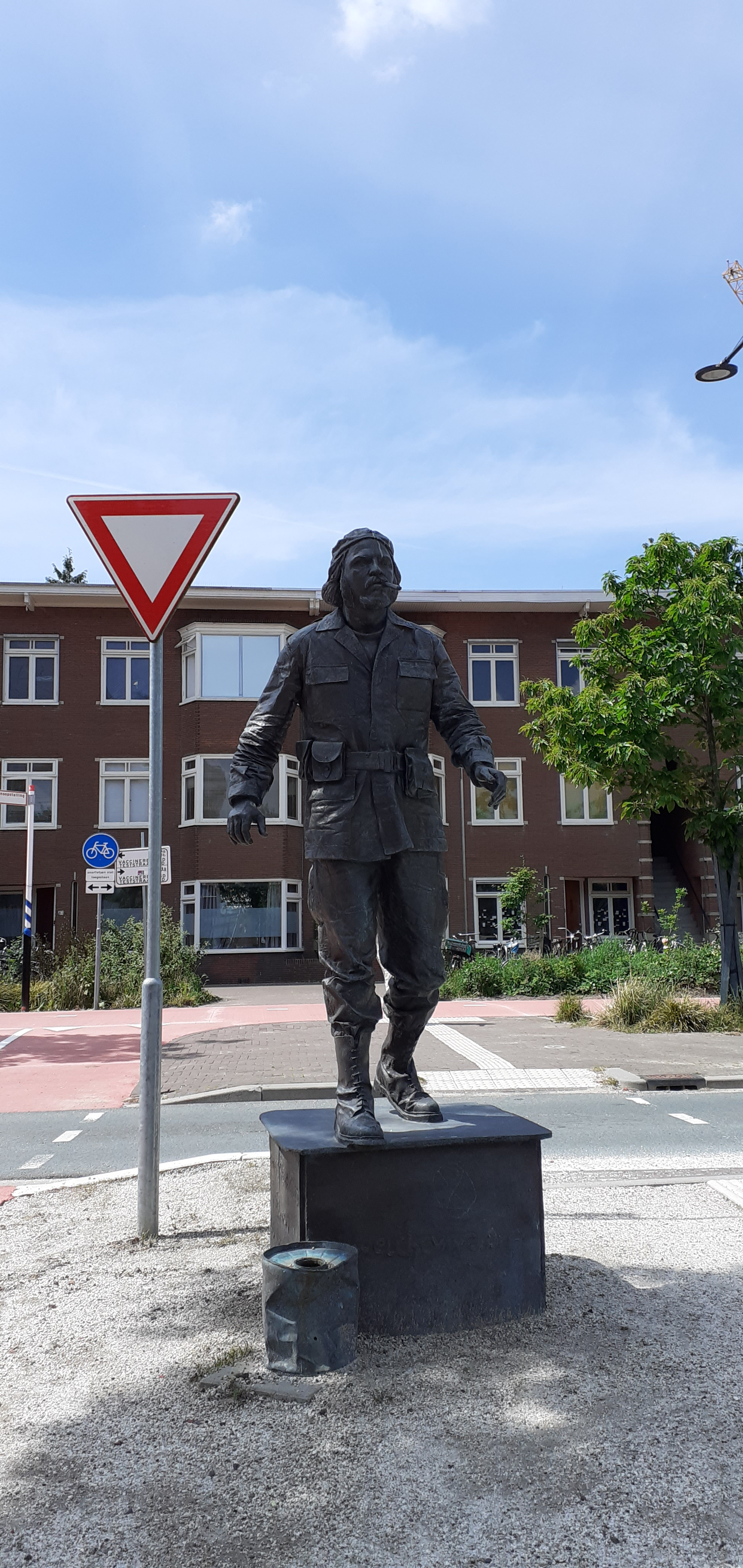
Statue of Che Guevara in Utrecht, Netherlands

- An average of about 800 international visitors each day make the trek to Che Guevara Mausoleum in Santa Clara, Cuba. The site, which contains a 22-foot-tall (6.7 m) bronze statue of Guevara, also includes his remains, a museum of his exploits, and an eternal flame in honor of his memory.
- In Venezuela, along the Andean mountain highway near the city of Mérida, an 8-foot glass plate bearing Guevara's image is erected near the top of El Aguila Peak. Guevara visited the spot in 1952 during his travels through South America, which he recorded in his diary.
- Rosario, Argentina, the city of Che's birth, features an Ernesto "Che" Guevara plaza. The centerpiece is a 13-foot bronze "Monument to Che" statue of Guevara, cast from thousands of donated and melted-down keys.
- In Alta Gracia, Argentina, the home where Guevara lived part of his childhood and teenage years, was turned into a museum in 1997. Titled "Villa Nidia", the museum features a sculpture depicting a young Ernesto at the age of 12, along with a tree in the backyard brought in from Cuba in October 2002 on 35th anniversary of Che's death.
- The Bolivian town of La Higuera (where Che was executed) hosts a statue of Guevara as does the bus terminal in El Alto, Bolivia, which features a 23-foot scrap metal sculpture of his likeness.
- The Jintai Museum park in Beijing, China (where Guevara visited chairman Mao Zedong in 1960), is home to a sculpted bust of Che, designed by Chinese artist Yuan Xikun.
- A park along the Danube river in Vienna, Austria, features a 28-inch bronze bust of a bearded Che in his "trademark" beret. At the 2008 unveiling, the city's Social Democratic mayor Michael Haeupl proclaimed the statue "a symbol of Vienna's intention to eradicate poverty."
- In the autonomous community of Oleiros, Galicia, a ten-meter high outline of Guevara's face was constructed by Cuban artist Juan Quintani. The mayor of Oleiros, Angel García Seoane, promoted the 2008 project to "honor Che and all the revolutionaries of the world."
- When Che Guevara visited the Yahala Kele rubber estate in Horana, Sri Lanka, on August 7, 1959, as part of a Cuban state visit to study rubber planting methods, he planted a mahogany tree. Fifty years later in 2009, the now large tree still stands, along with a small memorial at an adjacent bungalow showcasing Guevara's visit. Caretaker Dingiri Mahattaya, who met Che upon the visit as a young teen, remarked in 2009 that "this is the only surviving tree in the world that has been planted by Che Guevara."
- In 2009, the South African city of Durban, renamed Moore Road (in honor of colonial era British General Sir John Moore) to Che Guevara Road, in the revolutionary's honor. This was followed by a statue of Guevara being added to the gallery of "liberation struggle heroes" at Pretoria's Freedom Park.
- In Algiers, Algeria the main avenue along the seaside bears the name Che Guevara. Che visited the capital several times in the 1960s when Algeria was a symbol to African liberation movements after its war of independence from France, and according to the Latin American Herald Tribune, the guerrilla leader "is much loved by and well-known to Algerians."
- In Mexico City, Mexico, statues of Che Guevara and Fidel Castro were placed in 2018 to commemorate the first time both met after the start of the Cuban Revolution.

== In other uses ==
Gael García Bernal (played Che in The Motorcycle Diaries): "How would Ernesto feel about having his face all over the world on a T-shirt?"
Alberto Granado (travel mate of Che who accompanied him): "Well, knowing him, I think he wouldn't mind, especially if it was a girl."

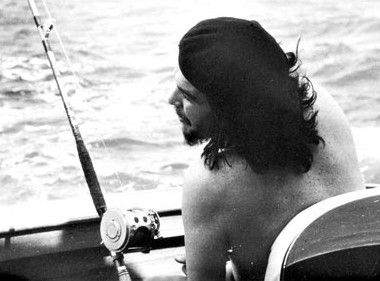
In March 2010, an original proof of this 1960 Alberto Korda photo of Guevara fishing against Ernest Hemingway, sold at auction for £ 6,600.

- On May 15, 1960, Che Guevara competed against acclaimed author Ernest Hemingway at the "Hemingway Fishing Contest" in Havana, Cuba. The winner of the competition was fellow boat mate Fidel Castro.
- In October 2007, former Central Intelligence Agency operative Gustavo Villoldo, auctioned off a lock of Che Guevara's hair for $119,500 to Bill Butler. The purchaser describes Guevara as "one of the greatest revolutionaries of the 20th century", and thus intends to display the 3-inch tress in his Butler & Sons books store in Rosenberg, Texas.
- On December 14, 2008, Iraqi journalist Muntadhar al-Zeidi threw both of his shoes at President George W. Bush, as an "act of defiance" during a Baghdad press conference. When reporters visited his one-bedroom apartment in west Baghdad, they found the home decorated with a poster Che Guevara, who according to The Associated Press "is widely lionized in the Middle East."
- Former Pakistani President Pervez Musharraf owns a German Shepherd dog named "Che", in honor of the revolutionary.
- At the 2009 Groundhog Day celebrations, the groundhog "Staten Island Chuck" bit the finger of New York City mayor Michael Bloomberg. As a result, Brooklyn entrepreneur Devery Doleman began selling shirts showing Chuck "revolting against the plutocrat mayor", while donning a Che Guevara beret. Creator Doleman, proclaimed the bite an obvious metaphor, while decreeing "Bloomberg cares only about rich people. He's the Marie Antoinette of mayors."
- In protest of losing Shea Stadium for the newly built Citi Field, two New York Mets fans Dave Croatto and Ryan Flanders, created "Viva Shea" t-shirts. The phonetic word play inspired shirt features Che Guevara in blue over an orange background (Met's colors) and perched atop Guevara's head is a NY Mets baseball hat.
- In April 2009, Raymond Scott a 52-year-old British book dealer accused of stealing the 1623 first edition of William Shakespeare's works from Durham University in 1998, arrived in the Consett Magistrates' Court dressed as Che Guevara.
- A documentary about Chilean LGBT activist Victor Hugo Robles was screened at the 2009 Sundance film festival titled El Che De Los Gays (The Che of the Gays). Robles, nicknamed the "Che of the Gays", adopted the nom-de-guerre while a university student during the oppression of homosexuals under Augusto Pinochet. As part of his attire he paints his lips "fiery red", while donning a black beret with a Che-like star on the beret in homage (replaced by a starfish to symbolise his self described "effeminacy"). In describing the reasoning, Robles remarked that "I chose Che because he is the ultimate metaphor of a contemporary revolutionary."
- The University of Texas offers a course titled "Che Guevara's Latin America", in which students read two of Guevara's travel diaries and his memoir of the Cuban revolutionary war. The aim of the course is to have students analyze the "sudden revival of Che's image in pop culture throughout the world", study Che's own personal observations, and survey class relations in those countries mentioned in Che's memoirs (Argentina, Chile, Bolivia, Peru, Guatemala, and Mexico).
- As an act of international solidarity, Cuba dispersed a group of medical doctors to the nation of Nicaragua in 2007. By the start of 2009, the unit titled the "Ernesto Che Guevara Brigade", were credited with treating 1,764,000 people, saving 363 lives, and operating on 3,893 patients. There is also a Cuban supplied and staffed "Che Guevara Medical Brigade" serving in Haiti, composed of 575 doctors and health professionals.

== Criticism ==
There are those, both supporters and detractors that object to the mass dissemination of Che's image in popular and counter-culture. His detractors dislike the widespread pictorial dissemination of someone they deem to be a "murderer" but also delight in the contradiction and/or irony of a Marxist being utilized as a Capitalist commodity. Conversely, some Che supporters object to the commodification or diminishing of his image by its use in popular culture, and resent those entrepreneurial companies who profit from and/or exploit his legacy; viewing such marketing as an obvious conflict to Guevara's personal ideology.

Regardless of the varying sentiments, Jonathan Green director of the UCR/Museum of Photography believes that there is no escaping the influence of Che's symbolism, remarking that "we cannot get away from the context of Che Guevara, whether we like him or hate him, whether we called him a revolutionary or a butcher. The fact that he lived and died for the ideas in which he believed, penetrates constantly in the image."

=== From an anti-Che perspective ===
The cult of Ernesto Che Guevara is an episode in the moral callousness of our time. Che was a totalitarian. He achieved nothing but disaster ... The present-day cult of Che – the t-shirts, the bars, the posters – has succeeded in obscuring this dreadful reality.

— Paul Berman, Slate

Mexican author Rogelio Villareal has noted how "the famous image is not venerated by all ... it has also been aged, laughed about, parodied, insulted, and distorted around the world." Conservative Mark Falcoff has remarked that Guevara is "a cultural icon" not because of "his example for poor countries" but as a result of "his capacity to provoke empathy among the spoiled youth of the affluent West." Historian Robert Conquest, of the Hoover Institution, has referred to such "empathy" and adulation among the young, as the "unfortunate affliction" of "adolescent revolutionary romanticism." Sean O'Hagan of The Observer contends that the appeal to such empathy is one of superficiality, remarking that "if Che hadn't been born so good-looking, he wouldn't be a mythical revolutionary." In the view of Ana Menéndez, author of the novel Loving Che, the fascination with Che is not with the man, but the photograph. While herself acknowledging him as a "great idealist", Menéndez believes there is a "fallibility of memory", which leads many to "gloss over the fact that he was also a brutal man, the head of a firing squad in the opening days of the revolution." Menéndez theorizes that such unsavory aspects are glossed over in the way one glosses over someone's flaws when in love. Jazz musician Paquito D'Rivera, himself a Cuban exile who fled the island after a run-in with Guevara, has criticized the positive portrayal of Che by musicians such as Santana, by noting the strict censorship of music at the time deemed "immoral" and "imperialist" by the Cuban government. In deference to such contradictions, Patrick Symmes, author of Chasing Che: A Motorcycle Journey in Search of the Guevara Legend, has hypothesized that "the more time goes by, the chicer and chicer Che gets because the less he stands for anything." Barcelona museum director Ivan de la Nuez, in the 2008 documentary "Chevolution" describes the overall phenomena by observing that "Capitalism devours everything – even its worst enemies."

=== From a pro-Che perspective ===
During the lifetime of great revolutionaries, the oppressing classes constantly hounded them, received their theories with the most savage malice, the most furious hatred and the most unscrupulous campaigns of lies and slander. After their death, attempts are made to convert them into harmless icons, to canonize them, so to say, and to hallow their names to a certain extent for the "consolation" of the oppressed classes and with the object of duping the latter, while at the same time robbing the revolutionary theory of its substance, blunting its revolutionary edge and vulgarizing it.

— Vladimir Lenin, The State and Revolution

Duke Latin American studies professor Ariel Dorfman hypothesizes that Che's been "comfortably transmogrified into a symbol of rebellion" precisely because those in power no longer believe him to be dangerous. Dorfman suspects the attempt to subvert Che could backfire, positing that 3 billion people now live on less than $2 a day and thus "the powerful of the earth should take heed: deep inside that T shirt where we have tried to trap him, the eyes of Che Guevara are still burning with impatience." Expressing a similar sentiment, director Jonathan Green acknowledges that "Che is turning over in his grave" because of the commercialization; in Green's view, Che's visage also has the potential to be a "Trojan horse" of capitalist marketing, by embedding itself into pop iconography. In his example, corporations in their desperate drive to sell goods, create the opportunity for observers to see the "logo" and ask "who was that guy?" Trisha Ziff, curator of Che! Revolution and Commerce believes that regardless of the "postmodern" diffusion, you can't disassociate Che from "radical ideas and change", nor can one control it. In Ziff's view, despite the endless array of merchandising, the symbol of Che will continue to be worn and have resonance. Critical pedagogical theorist Peter McLaren theorizes that American capitalism is responsible for the Che phenomenon, stating that "the United States has a seductive way of incorporating anything that it can't defeat and transforming that 'thing' into a weaker version of itself, much like the process of diluting the strength and efficacy of a virus through the creation of a vaccine." Neo-Marxist and critical theorist Herbert Marcuse argued that in the contemporary capitalist world there is no escaping such co-optation, theorizing that we are made "one-dimensional" by capitalism's single-minded orientation toward greed and growth. Author Susan Sontag spoke of the potential positive ramifications of utilizing Che as a symbol, positing:

I don't disdain the impact of Che as a romantic image, especially among newly radicalized youth in the United States and Western Europe; if the glamour of Che's person, the heroism of his life, and the pathos of his death, are useful to young people in strengthening their disaffiliation from the life-style of American imperialism and in advancing the development of a revolutionary consciousness, so much the better.
