= Borrego =

Borrego (Spanish: "lamb") may refer to:

== People ==
=== Surname ===
- Carla Borrego (b. 1983), Jamaican-Australian international basketball and netball player
- Diego Borrego (b. 1972), Spanish golfer
- Elías Borrego (b. 1990), Argentine footballer
- Francisco José Borrego (b. 1986), Spanish footballer
- Irene Borrego (b. 2001), Mexican weightlifter
- James Borrego (b. 1977), American basketball coach
- Jesse Borrego (b. 1962), American actor
- Maura Borrego, American engineering educator
- Manuel Borrego (b. 1934), Portuguese fencer
- Orlando Borrego (1936–2021), Cuban economist
- Ramon Borrego (born 1978), Venezuelan baseball coach

=== Nickname ===
- Gerardo Torrado (b. 1979), Mexican footballer. Known as "El borrego" ("The Sheep") for his bushy hair.

=== In fiction ===
- Carla Borrego, a fictional character in British television series Jonathan Creek

== Sport ==
- Borrego (horse)
- Borregos Salvajes (in English: Rams) the name of all the sports teams that represent the Monterrey Institute of Technology
- Borregos Salvajes – CEM Monterrey, Campus
- Los Angeles Rams NFL Football Team

== Entertainment ==
- Borrego (film), a survival-thriller film
- "El Borrego" ("The Sheep"), 1994 song originally from Café Tacuba's album Re

== Places ==
- Borrego Pass, New Mexico unincorporated community consisting of two Navajo communities and a trading post
- Borrego Valley Airport county-owned public airport three miles east of Borrego Springs
- Anza-Borrego Desert State Park located within the Colorado Desert of Southern California
- Borrego Springs, California, surrounded by Anza-Borrego Desert State Park, the largest of the California State Parks
- Borrego Springs Fire Protection District

== See also ==
- Kia Mohave variant Kia Borrego, named after the Anza-Borrego Desert State Park in California
