= Fusil contra fusil =

Song by Silvio Rodríguez

from the album Hasta la victoria siempre, Che querido
- Released: 1971
- Recorded: 1968
- Genre: Nueva trova
- Length: 3:00
- Label: Casa de las Américas
- Songwriter(s): Silvio Rodríguez

Audio sample
- "Fusil Contra Fusil": file; help

"Fusil contra fusil" (Spanish for "Rifle Against Rifle") is a song written and recorded by Silvio Rodríguez in 1968 as a tribute to Ernesto "Che" Guevara, who had died in 1967. It was first released by Casa de las Américas on the 1971 album Hasta la victoria siempre, Che querido. The lyrics of the song praise revolutionary heroism, as was commonplace in the incipient nueva trova movement of the late 1960s and early 1970s.

"Fusil contra fusil" was written before Rodríguez received formal musical training at ICAIC. The song was included in the third compilation album by the Grupo de Experimentación Sonora del ICAIC, an ensemble featuring the leading figures of the nueva trova movement. Lyrically, the words "fusil contra fusil" refer to Guevara's "name and his last name". The melody is composed in Dorian mode and uses the VII-I progressions and common tone third progressions that were usual in the rock genre of that period. The song also uses a modal mixture for a Picardy third ending.

The song has been popular in Cuba and was covered by several artists, such as Raquel Hernández and Blaak Heat. The song was included in the first part of the 2008 film Che. "Fusil contra fusil" is considered one of the most popular songs by Silvio Rodríguez.

== See also ==
- Che Guevara in popular culture
