= Maura Borrego =

American engineering educator

Maura J. Borrego (also published as Maura Lynn Jenkins) is a professor in the University of Texas at Austin Walker Department of Mechanical Engineering, where she holds an E.P. Schoch Professorship in Engineering and directs the Center for Engineering Education. Educated in materials science, her research focus has shifted to engineering education.

== Education and career ==
Borrego was an undergraduate student of materials science at the University of Wisconsin–Madison. She continued her studies at Stanford University, receiving a master's degree before completing her Ph.D. there. Her 2003 doctoral dissertation, Selection and use of silane adhesion promoters in microelectronic packaging, was supervised by John C. Bravman.

She worked as a faculty member at Virginia Tech from 2004 to 2014, becoming an associate professor of engineering education, and associate dean and director of interdisciplinary graduate education, before moving to the University of Texas at Austin in 2014. Prior to taking her current position as E.P. Schoch Professor, she held the William J. Murray, Jr. Fellowship in Engineering.

== Recognition ==
Borrego was a 2007 recipient of the Presidential Early Career Award for Scientists and Engineers. She was named as a Fellow of the American Society for Engineering Education in 2020.
