= El Ché-Cola =

French cola soft drink

- Type: soft drink
- Manufacturer: El Ché-Cola Company
- Origin: 2005; 20 years ago
- Discontinued: 2010; 15 years ago
- Flavour: cola
- Website: Defunct

El Ché-Cola was a cola soft drink manufactured in France (in Marseille) by the El Ché-Cola Company, which donated 50% of its net profits to NGOs that fight against world hunger. The cola was guaranteed GMO free, with less sugar than most other colas.

The name was an homage to Che Guevara.
