= Trek Thunder Kelly =

American artist

Trek Thunder Kelly is an American artist based in Venice, California. He achieved national recognition with his performance-art candidacy in the 2003 gubernatorial recall election in California. Kelly wore only the color blue for the year preceding the vote, and championed his consistency during the campaign. During the campaign, Kelly was a contestant on Game Show Network's Who Wants to Be Governor of California show, and afterwards, he appeared in How Arnold Won the West, a documentary about the election.

In 2016 the Los Angeles Times profiled his five years of living in a van in Venice Beach. Kelly's painting The Suicide of Frda Kahlo portrays Kahlo as androgynous.

Kelly was the host of a 30-part video series by Carnival Cruise lines titles GO.
