= Orlando Borrego =

Cuban economist, writer and guerrilla (1936–2021)

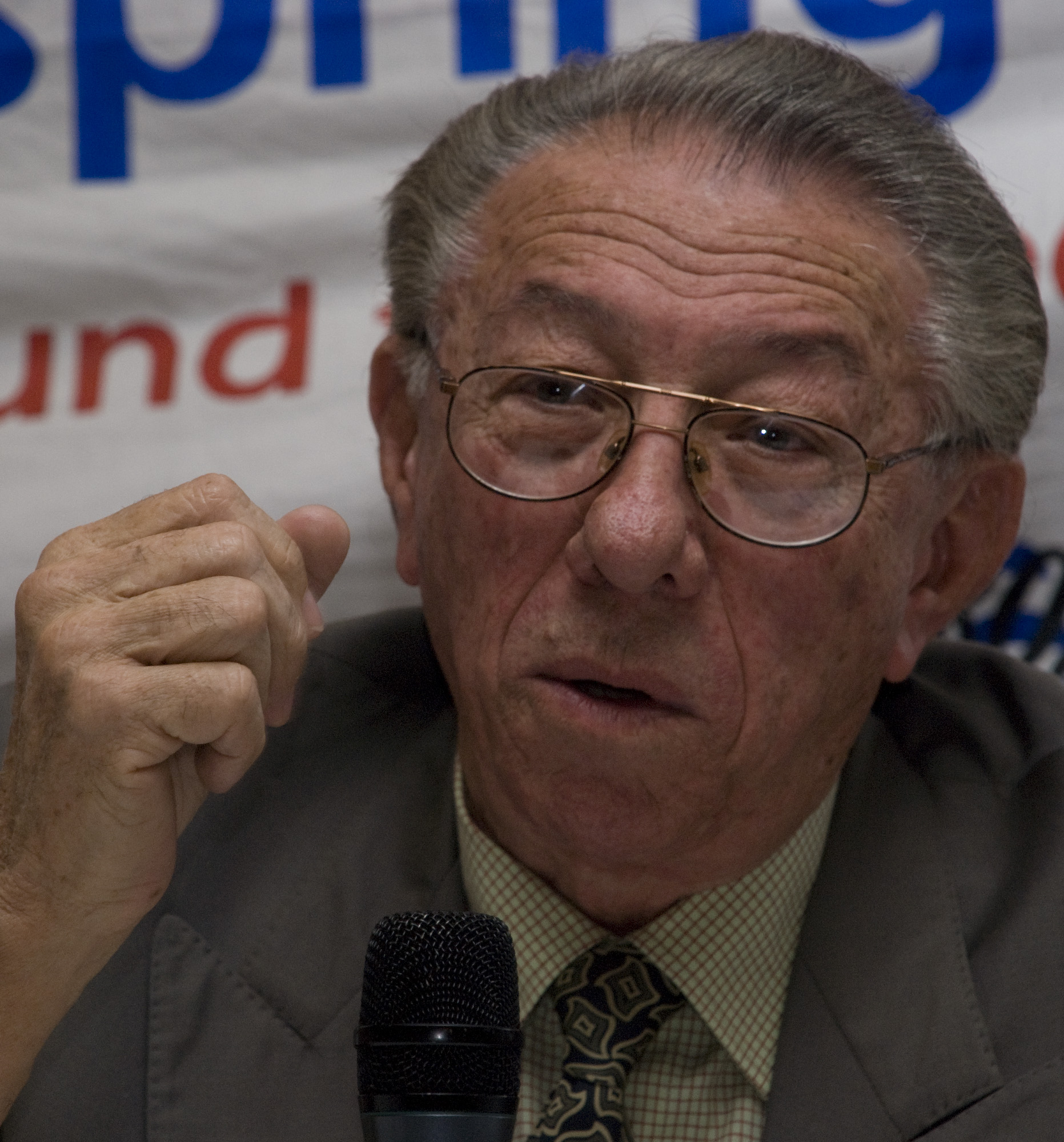
- Orlando Borrego speaking about Che Guevara at Liverpool John Moores University.
- Born: March 3, 1936; Holguín, Cuba
- Died: June 26, 2021 (aged 85)

Orlando Borrego (March 3, 1936 – June 26, 2021) was a Cuban economist, writer and guerrilla who worked with Che Guevara during the Cuban Revolution.

== Life and career ==
Orlando Borrego was born on March 3, 1936 into a peasant family who later identified with the Partido Ortodoxo of Eduardo Chibas. His father was a taxi driver and his mother a teacher. In 1952, Fulgencio Batista led a coup against Cuba's democratic government, weeks before an election which the Partido Ortodoxo were touted to win. While he was still at secondary school, Borrego became one of the earliest supporters of the organisation which was to become the 26th of July Movement, before Fidel Castro led the attack on the Moncada Barracks which was to give the organisation its name.

In October 1958, Borrego joined a column of the 26th of July Movement's rebel army in the Escambray Mountains, which was under the command of Che Guevara. By the revolution's triumph in January 1959, Borrego had achieved the rank of First Lieutenant.

Immediately after the revolutionary army's entrance in Havana Borrego worked alongside Guevara at La Cabaña fortress. He was appointed Head of the Military Economic Board and served as a prosecutor at the trials of several members of the Batista regime. In October 1959, Che was named head of the Department of Industrialisation, which was set up within the National Institute of Agrarian Reform (INRA). INRA had been set up to institute the Agrarian Reform Law of May 1959. Che decided to bring Borrego to INRA as his deputy, Aleida March as his personal assistant and José Manresa as his secretary. However, the following month, Che became President of the National Bank, and Borrego was left to run the Department of Industrialisation. The two continued to meet regularly to discuss all progress and measures taken. In February 1961 Che was appointed head of the newly expanded Ministry of Industries (MININD), with Orlando Borrego as his Vice-Minister. Borrego played an important role in the development of the Budgetary Finance System.

In 1964, the massive Consolidated Enterprise of Sugar was split off from MININD to form a separate Ministry of Sugar. Borrego was appointed head of the new Ministry. Borrego continued to be an adherent of the Budgetary Finance System, and worked closely with Che to improve it. When Che left for the Democratic Republic of the Congo in 1965, he left Borrego with his personal copy of Das Kapital. Borrego met with Che for the last time in 1966, during secret preparations for Che's ill-fated expedition in Bolivia. Borrego left as Minister of Sugar in 1968. Although equipped with little evidence, Cuban-American writer Servando Gonzalez, a well-known critic of Cuba, has claimed that Borrego was fired by Fidel Castro in a fit of rage for expressing his doubts over the possibility that the 1970 sugar quota would be attained. Both Castro and Borrego have dismissed Gonzalez's assertion as complete myth. Borrego finally achieved his doctorate in economics from the University of Havana in 1973.

From 1973 until 1980, Borrego served as an advisor to the Council of Ministers of Cuba, while at the same time achieving another doctorate from the Central Economic Mathematical Institute in the Soviet Union. In 1997, alongside Che's son Ernesto, Borrego visited Lebanon, where he met with President Elias Hrawi, toured areas near the border with Israel and expressed support for the Lebanese people's struggle against Israeli occupation.

Borrego later served as an advisor to the Cuban Ministry of Transport. He visited Venezuela on several occasions, where his book "Che – El Camino del Fuego" was praised by Hugo Chavez as helping him to discover Che as a thinker and an economist. He also visited Great Britain in 2008 on a tour organised by Rock Around the Blockade where he spoke alongside philosopher Jesús Garcia and student leader Yoselin Rufin.

In July 2014, Venezuelan president Nicolás Maduro appointed Borrego as an advisor.

Borrego died from complications of COVID-19 on June 26, 2021, at the age of 86.

=== On Che Guevara ===
What explains the Che mania? Guevara's allure seems to stem, rather, from a nostalgic longing for the pure, uncompromising ideals of the past. In a world of ferocious competition and consumerism, some element of humanity is still looking for a hero with values. In Che, they have a paradigm: a man who was absolutely honest, completely selfless, constantly perfecting his personality.

— Orlando Borrego, Newsweek magazine, 1997

== Published works ==
- Celebración de la bienvenida a Cuba de la brigada de refuerzo de Ernesto Che Guevara (Pathfinder 1998); ISBN 978-0-87348-872-3
- Che – El Camino del Fuego (Hombre Nuevo 2001); ISBN 978-987-98791-0-8
- Che, Recuerdos En Rafaga, (Ciencias Sociales 2004); ISBN 978-959-06-0650-2
- Rumbo al Socialismo, (Ciencias Sociales 2006)
