= Imagen Latina =

Studio album by Alberto Naranjo
- Released: 1992
- Recorded: 1992
- Genre: Jazz band, Latin American music
- Length: 71:48
- Label: LEON
- Producer: Alberto Naranjo; Orlando Montiel; Mariela León; Freddy León

Alberto Naranjo chronology
El Trabuco Venezolano Vol. IV	Imagen Latina	Oblación

Imagen Latina is an album by Venezuelan musician Alberto Naranjo, originally released in 1992 and reedited thrice in 2002, 2008 and 2012. It is the seventh album (fifth studio album) of El Trabuco Venezolano musical project arranged and directed by Naranjo.

Trabuco is a Spanish term used in Venezuelan baseball slang to describe an All-Star selection of players. So, El Trabuco Venezolano means "The Venezuelan All-Star Band", in the best sense of the phrase. Naranjo (Caracas, 1941) is one of Venezuela's icons of contemporary music, establishing his prestige as an arranger, conductor, composer and drummer. In 1992 Naranjo produced Imagen Latina. Soloists with an already established career in Venezuela participated in this project; renowned salseros as Canelita Medina, Carlos Espósito, Vladimir Lozano, Trina Medina, Carlos Daniel Palacios and Mauricio Silva; noted folklorists as Simón Díaz, Cecilia Todd and the group Serenata Guayanesa, and also counted with the collaboration of poet Jesús Rosas Marcano, musician Benjamín Brea, pop singer María Rivas, jazz pianist Otmaro Ruiz, and the polifacetic Aldemaro Romero. Most salsa bands are a tightly wound unit that developed their music through years of playing in clubs around their hometown. El Trabuco Venezolano never subscribed to that aesthetic. As the vehicle for the arrangements of Naranjo, his Trabuco defied all salsa conventions in the 1970s. The eclectic body of Naranjo's work shows some debt to Billo Frómeta, Tito Puente and the Thad Jones/Mel Lewis Big Band, preferring traditional guaracha, jazz, bolero, mambo and Venezuelan genres, creating a sophisticated and distinctive sound with accessible melodic hooks, complex harmonies and time signatures, as well as a special devotion to the recording studio. This record was never released outside of Venezuela, and after ten years of relative obscurity, the company Merusa Records of Netherlands introduced it at the international level. One of the songs included in the album, Calipso de El Callao, is listed in the book 1001 Songs: You Must Hear Before You Die.

== Track listing ==
#	Song	Composer(s)	Vocal(s)	Solo(s)	Time
1	Al fin juntas	Alberto Naranjo; J. Rosas Marcano	Canelita Medina; Trina Medina	Pedro Vilela	6:22
2	Te amo	Mauricio Silva	Mauricio Silva		5:07
3	El chivo	Balbino García	Carlos Daniel Palacios; Carlos Espósito	Federico Britos	4:50
4	Calipso de El Callao	Folklore	Serenata Guayanesa	Saúl Vera	4:12
5	El corazón del Caribe	Trina Medina	Trina Medina		3:25
6	Se baila así	Manolo del Valle	Carlos Daniel Palacios		4:36
7	Sin tu mirada	Rafael Salazar	Cecilia Todd	Federico Britos	3:46
8	Hace rato	Ricardo Hernández	Carlos Espósito		4:09
9	Qué vale más	Simón Díaz	Simón Díaz	Benjamín Brea	4:12
10	Señor Tiempo	Carlos Espósito; Alberto Borregales; Justo Vega	Carlos Espósito	Alberto Vergara	5:42
11	Amor de alquiler	Alberto Naranjo; J. Rosas Marcano	María Rivas	Aldemaro Romero	6:12
12	Boleros Venezolanos				6:58
a-	Soñando despierto	Aníbal Abreu	Vladimir Lozano
b-	Me queda el consuelo	Aldemaro Romero	Vladimir Lozano	Manuel Freire
c-	No volveré a encontrarte	Carlos J. Maytín	Vladimir Lozano	Lucio Caminiti
13	Sin mañana ni ayer	Alberto Naranjo; J. Rosas Marcano	Hughette Contramaestre		5:07
14	Alna's Mambo	Alberto Naranjo	Instrumental	Alberto Naranjo; Otmaro Ruiz	7:08
				Total time	71:48

== Personnel ==
- Alberto Naranjo – leader, arranger, drums on all tracks; timbales (dubbed) on 11, 14
- Alberto Lazo – acoustic piano on all tracks, except on 12
- Lucio Caminiti – acoustic piano on track 12
- Yrvis Méndez – bass guitar on all tracks, except on 12
- José Velázquez – bass guitar on track 12
- Benjamín Brea – saxophone or woodwinds on all tracks, except on 12
  (soprano, alto, tenor and baritone saxes; flute, piccolo)
- Gustavo Aranguren and Rafael Rey – trumpet and/or flugelhorn on all tracks, except on 12
- César Pérez – trombone on all tracks, except on 12
- Gerardo Rosales – congas or additional percussion on all tracks, except on 12
- Franklin Rojas – bongos or additional percussion on all tracks, except on 12
- Francisco Rojas – timbales or additional percussion on all tracks, except on 12
- Felipe Rengifo – congas on track 12
- Jesús Quintero – bongos on track 12
- Carlos Daniel Palacios – lead vocal on tracks 3, 6 and chorus
- Carlos Espósito – lead vocal on tracks 3, 8, 10 and chorus

== Guests ==
Lead vocals

- Canelita Medina – track 1
- Trina Medina – tracks 1, 5
- Mauricio Silva – track 2 (trombone solo add)
- Serenata Guayanesa – track 4
- Cecilia Todd – track 7
- Simón Díaz – track 9
- María Rivas – track 11
- Vladimir Lozano – track 12
- Hughette Contramaestre – track 13

Musicians

- Pedro Vilela – Cuban tres and electric guitar on track 1
- Federico Britos – violin solo on tracks 3, 7
- Saúl Vera – mandolin solo on track 4
- Alberto Vergara – vibraphone solo on track 10
- Aldemaro Romero – acoustic piano cadenza and solo on track 11
- Manuel Freire – saxes and woodwinds on track 12
  (soprano, alto, tenor and baritone saxes; C flute, G flute, clarinet and bass clarinet – all dubbed)
- Otmaro Ruíz – acoustic piano solo on 14
- Strings section on track 12
  - Violins: Alberto Flamini (concertmaster), Carmelo Russo, Sigfrido Chiva, Grigorije Girovski,
    Bogdan Biegniewski, Inocente Carreño, Sigfrido Chiva, Boris Jivkov, Alejandro Ramírez
  - Violas: Francisco Molo, José Olmedo
  - Cellos: Lauren Levenson, Bodgan Trochanowski
  - Harp: Alba Quintanilla

== Other credits ==
- Producers: Alberto Naranjo and Orlando Montiel
- Executive producers: Mariela León and Freddy León
- Staff coordinator: Freddy Sanz
- All tracks were recorded and mixed at Estudios Intersonido by Augie Verde (1992),
  except track 12, recorded and mixed at Estudios Sono Dos Mil by Ricardo Landaeta (1980)
- Mastered at Formacol, Venezuela
- ID: LEON CD 1140
- PD: 21592613
- Releases
  - Leon CD-1140 (1992)
  - Merusa CD-9253 (2002)
  - Leon CD-1140-B (2008)
  - Leon CD-1140-C (2012)
- Recorded and produced in Caracas, Venezuela, 1992

== Sources and reviews ==
- Chumancera Latin Jazz (Spanish)
- Deezer
- Descarga
- El Trabuco, a music All Stars (English / Spanish / Deutsch)
- Fundacion Interchange Netherlands
- Salsa 2U (Spanish)
- Sincopa
- Venciclopedia (Spanish)
- Technobeat
