= Memo Morales =

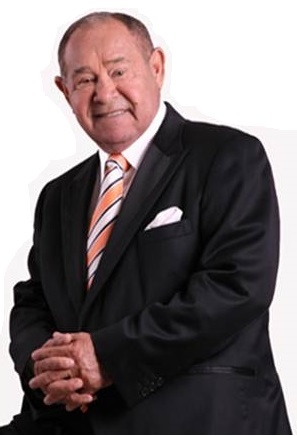
- Memo Morales in 2010

Background information
- Also known as: Memo Morales
- Born: Guillermo Enrique Morales Portillo; 6 April 1937; Maracaibo, Venezuela
- Died: 1 January 2017 (aged 79) Caracas, Venezuela
- Genres: Tropical bailable, Música Española, Gaita Pasadobles, Rumba Flamenca, Boleros Morunos
- Occupation: Singer

Guillermo Enrique Morales Portillo (6 April 1937 – 1 January 2017) was a Venezuelan singer. Better known as Memo Morales, he was also dubbed as El Gitano Maracucho.

Morales was the main voice of many important orchestras of the country, as were the Luis Alfonzo Larrain and Billo's Caracas Boys popular dance bands.

== Career ==
Born into a musical family, Morales started as a child prodigy while attending radio amateur singing contests. In 1945, he went to Caracas, where he participated in "Proarte infantil", in which he interpreted the "Princesita rubia" tango that earned him his first award.

Morales began his professional musical career in 1953 as a crooner for the Garrido y sus Solistas band. In 1954, he moved to Caracas and worked there until 1958 with Juanito Arteta and his Orchestra.

In 1958, Morales joined the Carlos Torres band, and from 1959 to 1960 was the lead singer of the aforementioned Larraín orchestra. Afterwards, he was a member of the Pedroza y sus Caciques and Hermanos Salani orchestras between 1961 and 1964.

In between, Morales sang to former Venezuelan president Marcos Pérez Jiménez, when he celebrated one of his birthdays in the Military Circle of Caracas and the Summit of El Ávila (today El Ávila National Park), as well as when the Hotel Humboldt opened in the mid-1950s. On that occasion Morales sang for thirty consecutive days for the first visitors of the then novel construction.

In 1964, Morales joined the Billo's Caracas Boys, working together with other large names such as Cheo García (El Guarachero de América) and José Luis Rodríguez (El Puma), popularizing pasodobles such as "Ni Se Compra, Ni Se Vende" and "Viva España". This progression brought him such huge hits as "Se Necesitan Dos", "Rumores", "Parece Mentira", "El Tunante", "Dámele Betún", "Juanita Bonita", "Qué Tienes Tú", "Eva", "La Rubia y la Trigueña", among many other songs.

In 1976, Morales had a successful tour of concerts as a soloist in the United States, where he performed in New York City, Los Angeles, San Francisco, and Miami.

Besides, Morales founded, along with Luisín Landáez, La Nuestra in 1981, and later rejoined with García in 1984 to create La Gran Orquesta de Cheo y Memo. They performed together until Garcia's death in 1994. Morales next to their children William, Alicia, Mariela and Gustavo, covered the Organización Musical Memo Morales, led by his son William (Memito) Morales.

On 1 April 2016, Morales was appointed as an honorary citizen and ambassador of good will from the mayor of the city of Houston, Sylvester Turner, in recognition of his valuable musical contribution to humanity.

== Death ==
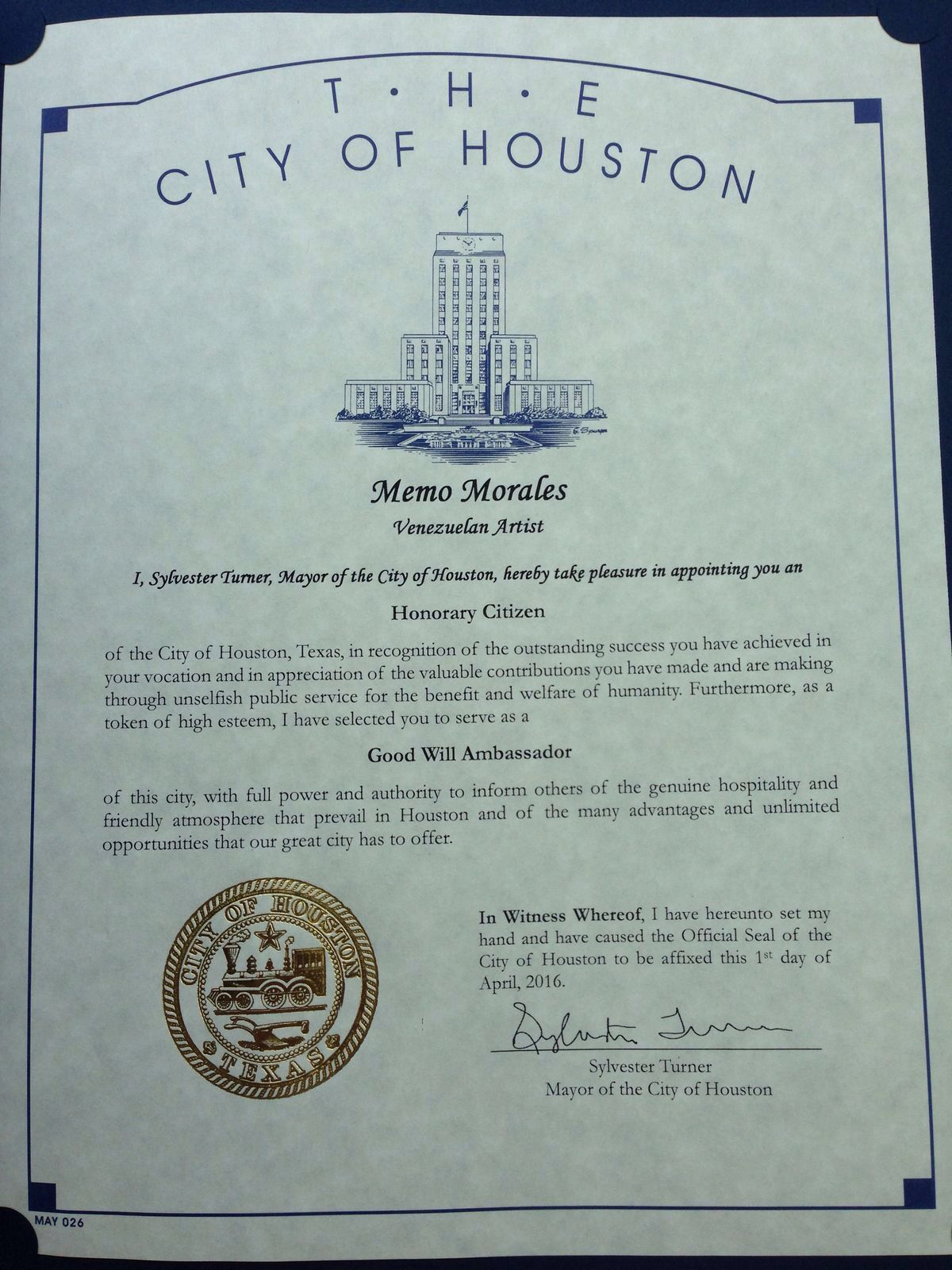
The certificate presented to Memo Morales.

On 1 January 2017, at a New Year's Eve concert at the Galician Brotherhood in Caracas at 2:30 am, while on stage, Morales suffered a heart attack. Despite having vital signs in the ambulance, he stopped breathing while being transported to the hospital and was declared dead. Hours earlier, he gave his last full concert in the Military Circle hall in Caracas.
