= Benjamín Brea =

Venezuelan musician (1946–2014)

Background information
- Born: Benjamín Arsenio Brea Constenla; September 18, 1946; Galicia, Spain
- Died: 23 April 2014 (aged 67) Caracas, Venezuela
- Genres: Jazz, classical, folk, Latin, pop
- Occupation: Musician
- Instruments: Saxophone, flute, oboe, clarinet
- Years active: 1956–2014
- Website: musicavenezuela.com/artistas/benjamin-brea

Benjamín Brea (18 September 1946 - 23 April 2014) was a Spanish-born Venezuelan musician, arranger and teacher, mostly associated with jazz, even though he had the advantage to play several music genres in various bands as a soloist as well as sideman and conductor.

== Career ==
Born Benjamín Arsenio Brea Constenla in Galicia, Spain, he moved with his parents to Venezuela in the early 1960s. He received formal music training in Caracas and graduated under Vicente Emilio Sojo in the José Ángel Lamas school of music. Brea started his professional career in 1962, playing saxophone, flute, oboe, clarinet, and bass clarinet.

After playing with local dance bands, he remained and performed on soundtracks and jingles. In addition, he became a member of the Radio Caracas Television orchestra and the Philharmonic Orchestra of Caracas conducted by Aldemaro Romero. He worked with Jeff Berlin, Paquito D'Rivera, Julio Iglesias, Armando Manzanero, Danilo Pérez, Arturo Sandoval, The Jackson Five and The Supremes, while playing in jazz big band formats led by Porfi Jiménez, Alberto Naranjo and Gerry Weil. In between, he performed with Soledad Bravo, Vytas Brenner, Maria Teresa Chacin, Ilan Chester, Franco de Vita, Simón Díaz, Gualberto Ibarreto, Los Cañoneros, Ricardo Montaner, Alí Primera, María Rivas, Serenata Guayanesa and Cecilia Todd.

Despite working as a sideman in recording sessions, Brea released only three albums. His first solo album, Another Point of View, was released in 1995 and consists of jazz standards by Duke Ellington and Glenn Miller. It includes Moonlight Serenade and Summertime as well as a version of the Andean classic El Cóndor Pasa.

His second album, Un Viejo Amor, is a more romantic offering and less jazzy, while Christmas Saxes was a production made by him alone, recording the soprano, alto, tenor, and baritone saxophone tracks in counterpoint with the aid of engineer Javier Alquati. This last album is a compilation of traditional Christmas songs from Venezuela and beyond.

He organized a jazz band and was a staff member at the El Hatillo Jazz Festival, which is an annual event celebrated in the small town of El Hatillo Town, Venezuela.

In January 2014, Brea fainted while attending a rehearsal and was moved to a hospital in Caracas, where he was diagnosed with stomach cancer. He died on 23 April 2014, at the age of 67.

== Discography ==
- 1995 Another Point of View
- 1997 Un Viejo Amor
- 1999 Christmas Saxes
- 2000 Siempre Seremos Niños
