= Swing con Son =

Studio album by Alberto Naranjo
- Released: 1996
- Recorded: 1996
- Genre: Latin American; Latin jazz Music of Venezuela
- Length: 63:03
- Label: Obeso & Pacanins 1996-002
- Producer: Alberto Naranjo; Roberto Obeso; Federico Pacanins

Alberto Naranjo chronology
Oblación	Swing con Son	Dulce y Picante

Swing con Son is a 1996 album by Venezuelan musician Alberto Naranjo.

== Track listing ==
#	Song	Composer(s)	Vocal(s)	Time
1	Invitación / No te retrates	Chapuseaux / Damirón		3:27
2	Tema de la Orquesta	(L. Frómeta)	C. Espósito & A. Guaramato	0:36
3	El Muerto de las Gradillas	L. Frómeta	Carlos Espósito	3:58
4	Swing con Son	L. Frómeta	María Rivas	4:27
5	Mi Saxofón	L. Frómeta	Carlos Espósito	4:18
6	Guarachona	Fidelina Hernández	Arturo Guaramato	3:51
7	Mosaico Nº 6			7:15
a-	Niebla del riachuelo	Cobián / Cadícamo	Juan José Capella
b-	Bruca maniguá	Arsenio Rodríguez	Arturo Guaramato
c-	Mi canción del mar	Sabre Marroquí	Juan José Capella
d-	Panamá	E. Lecuona	Arturo Guaramato
8	Ni se compra ni se vende	Guijarro / Monreal	Fusión IV	3:03
9	Papá Bocó	M. Sánchez Acosta		4:09
10	El Profesor Rui Rua	Mariano Mercerón	Carlos Espósito	3:39
11	Mosaico Colombiano			10:16
a-	El caimán	J. M. Peñaranda
b-	Juepa	E. Arias	Arturo Guaramato
c-	La vaca vieja	Clímaco Sarmiento	Carlos Espósito
d-	Rosa	Pacho Galán	Arturo Guaramato
e-	Lolita	E. Villamizar	Carlos Espósito
f-	Noche Novembrina	(DD)	Arturo Guaramato
12	Mosaico Venezolano	(L. Frómeta)		5:33
a-	Canto a Caracas		Nancy Toro
b-	Epa Isidoro		Juan José Capella
c-	Mensaje a Juan Vicente		N. Toro & J.J. Capella
d-	'Toy contento		N. Toro & J.J. Capella
13	Entrevista con Rafa Galíndo y Manolo Monterrey (1ra. parte)			4:43
14	Caracas vieja	L. Frómeta	R. Galíndo & M. Monterrey	2:18
15	Entrevista con Rafa Galíndo y Manolo Monterrey (2da. parte)			0:43
Total time				63:03

== Alberto Naranjo & Latin Jazz Big Band personnel ==
- Alberto Naranjo – leader, arrangements, drums, timbales
- Alberto Lazo – acoustic piano
- Jorge Del Pino – acoustic bass
- Julio Flores – soprano and alto saxophones; flute
- Evencio Villamizar – alto saxophone, flute
- Hernando Bonilla – tenor saxophone, flute
- Bautista Chacón – tenor saxophone, clarinet
- Horacio Mogollón – baritone saxophone, clarinet
- José Rodríguez, Agustin Valdés, Nelson Contreras, Figueredo Zerpa – trumpets, flugelhorns
- Domingo Pagliuca, Alberto Benedetti – tenor trombones
- Oscar Mendoza, Antonio Ponte – bass trombones
- Vladimir Quintero – congas
- Enrique Mata – bongos, Dominican tambora
- José Hernández – maracas, güiro

== Lead vocals ==
- Carlos Espósito (tracks 3, 5, 7, 10, 11)
- Arturo Guaramato (tracks 6, 7, 11)
- Juan José Capella (tracks 7, 12)

== Special guests ==
- Billo's Happy Boys Orchestra (track 1)
- Billo's Caracas Boys (track 13)
- María Rivas – lead vocal (track 4)
- Rafa Galindo, Manolo Monterrey – lead vocals (track 14)
- Nancy Toro – lead vocal (track 12)
- Fusión IV + 2 – vocal group (track 8)
- Rafael Velásquez – trumpet / flugel horn solos (tracks 3, 4 / 6)
- Frank Hernández, Yorman Méndez – timbal solos (track 7)
- Gustavo Carucí – acoustic guitar (track 14)
- Annette León – harp (track 12)
- Joao Aponte, Luis Serrano – chorus (tracks 2, 3, 4, 5, 6, 7, 9, 10, 11)
- Adela Blanco, Elisa Vegas, Eugenia Vegas – kids chorus (track 10)

== Other credits ==
- Recorded and mixed by Agustín [Augie] Verde at Estudios Intersonido in Caracas, Venezuela
- Date of recording: March through May 1996
- Musical producer: Alberto Naranjo
- Executive producers: Roberto Obeso and Federico Pacanins
- Graphic design/Illustrations: Adriana Reina
- Photographers: Alejandro Toro, Angel de la Osa
