= El Trabuco Venezolano Vol. III =

Studio album by El Trabuco Venezolano

Studio album by El Trabuco Venezolano
- Released: 1981
- Recorded: 1981
- Genre: Jazz band, Latin American music
- Length: 44:58
- Label: YVKCT con músiC.A. - YVLP-013; Released by Integra C. A. (Venezuela); Artomax (Puerto Rico)
- Producer: Orlando Montiel; Alberto Naranjo

El Trabuco Venezolano chronology
El Trabuco Venezolano Vol. II	El Trabuco Venezolano Vol. III	Irakere & Trabuco Vol. 1

El Trabuco Venezolano - Vol. III is a vinyl LP by Venezuelan musician Alberto Naranjo, originally released in 1981 and partially rereleased in two CD albums titled El Trabuco Venezolano 1977 - 1984 Vol. 1 (1994) and Vol. 2 (1995). It is the third of seven albums (two live albums) of the El Trabuco Venezolano musical project arranged and directed by Naranjo.

== Track listing ==
#	Song	Composer(s)	Vocal(s)	Solo(s)	Time
A1	Merengue venezolano (Intro)	Alberto Naranjo	Cecilia Todd	Melo	0:35
A2	El muñeco de la ciudad	Adrián Pérez	J. Ruiz		6:41
A3	La música	Grupo Mango	M. Daubeterre	Aranguren	6:43
A4	El gavilán	Indio Figueredo	C. D. Palacios		8:18
B5	Tres días	Chucho Valdés	C. D. Palacios		5:52
B6	Compadre Pancho	Lorenzo Herrera	C. Espósito	Monge, Guerra	7:14
B7	Siempre te vas en las tardes	Eduardo Ramos	M. Daubeterre	R. Silva, Aranguren	6:42
B8	Maracucha	Ricardo Hernández	Guaco	Aranguren	5:00
				Total time	44:58

== Personnel ==
- Alberto Naranjo - drums, arranger, director on all tracks;
  timbales on 4, 5, 6
- Samuel del Real - piano on all tracks
- Lorenzo Barriendos - bass guitar on all tracks, except on 2
- José Velázquez - bass guitar on 2
- Frank Hernández - timbales on 3
- Felipe Rengifo - congas; Afro Venezuelan percussion on 1, 2; Batá drum (Iyá) on 5
- Jesús Quintero - bongos on 4, 6; Afro Venezuelan percussion on 1, 2
- Luisito Quintero - bongos on 1, 3, 5; Batá drum (Okónkolo) on 5
- Carlos Quintero - Afro Venezuelan percussion on 1, 2
- Manuel Urbina - Bata drums (Itótele) on 5
- Luis Arias - trumpet on all tracks, except on 1, 6
- Gustavo Aranguren - trumpet on all tracks, except on 1; flugel horn on 7
- José Díaz F. - trumpet on 2, 4, 5, 8; flugel horn on 7
- Luis Lewis Vargas - trumpet on 2, 4, 5, 8; flugel horn on 7
- Pablo Armitano - trumpet on 3, 8; flugel horn on 7
- Elías Guerra - trumpet on 3, 5, 8
- Rafael Silva - trombone on all tracks, except on 1, 8
- Leopoldo Escalante - trombone on 2, 4
- Carlos Espinoza - trombone on 2
- Onésimo García - trombone on 3, 4, 5, 7
- Mauricio Silva - trombone on 3, 5, 7, 8
- Alejandro Pérez Palma - trombone on 6, 8
- Oscar Mendoza - bass trombone on 8
- Carlos Daniel Palacios - lead singer on 4, 5 and chorus
- Moisés Daubeterre - lead singer on 3, 7 and chorus
- Carlos Espósito - lead singer on 6 and chorus
- Joe Ruiz - lead singer on 2 and chorus

=== Guest musicians ===
- Cecilia Todd - lead singer on 1
- Grecia Garrett - vocals on 7
- Carolina Landaeta - vocals on 7
- Rosalía Quintero - vocals on 7
- Grupo Guaco on 8; Gustavo Aguado - lead singer
- Angel Melo - Venezuelan cuatro on 1, 2
- Gerardo Alonzo - trumpet on 6
- Carlos de León - trumpet on 6
- César Monge - trombone on 6
- Carlos Guerra (Jr) - trombone on 6

=== Technical personnel ===
- Executive producer: Orlando Montiel
- Musical director and associate producer: Alberto Naranjo
- Staff coordinator: Freddy Sanz
- Cover design: Santiago Pol and Orlando Montiel, realized by Vibra-Crom C. A.
- Photos: Filippo Billoti (cover), Oscar Booy, César Salazar, Fernando Sánchez
- Label: YVKCT con músiC.A. in association with Integra C. A. YVLP-013
- Print: Gastello
- Place of Recording: Estudios Sono Dos Mil
- Recording engineer: Ricardo Landaeta - Ignacio Rojas (assistant)
- Produced in Caracas, Venezuela, 1981
