= Dulce y Picante =

Studio album by Alberto Naranjo

Studio album by Alberto Naranjo
- Released: 1998
- Recorded: 1998
- Genre: Latin jazz
- Length: 72:08
- Label: Obeso & Pacanins
- Producer: Alberto Naranjo; Roberto Obeso; Federico Pacanins

Alberto Naranjo chronology
Swing con Son	Dulce y Picante

Dulce y Picante (Spanish for Sweet and Spicy) is a 1998 album from Alberto Naranjo.

== Track listing ==
Track	Song title	Composer(s)	Time
1	Tema de la Orquesta	José Pérez Figuera	1:25
2	Cu tu gu rú	Castro/Davis	5:18
3	Te caigo a tiros	Manolo Monterrey	4:03
4	Quisiera yo	Jesús Camacaro	4:07
5	Mambo La Roca	Mirta Sánchez	2:57
6	Vamos a beber	Néstor Brito	3:49
7	La jaiba y el cangrejito	A. Rodríguez/F. García	3:49
8	Dulce y picante	Larrain	4:36
9	En un mercado persa	Albert Ketèlbey	4:14
10	Merengues venezolanos	Medley	5:01
a	Métele de ancho	Larrain	
b	Esta es Venezuela	César Viera	
c	Un cigarrillo	Juan R. Barrios	
11	Congo Blues	Eduardo Cabrera	6:29
12	Potpourri	Medley	10:25
a	Quisiera	Larrain	
b	Maracaibo	Chucho Sanoja	
c	No me sigas mirando	Larrain	
d	Alardoso	Enrique Jorrín	
e	Anna	Franco/Vatro	
f	La Pelota	Manolo Monterrey	
g	Narración	Pancho Pepe Cróquer	
h	Take Me Out to the Ball Game	Norworth/Von Tilzer	
13	Amándonos	Larrain	2:27
14	Larrain Orchestra	bonus track	13:28
a	Comparsa barracón	Bebo Valdés	
b	Chin, chin, chiribín	Delia Arias	
c	El macho	ARR	
d	Kikirindongo	Néstor Brito	
e	Tema de la Orquesta	José Pérez Figuera	
			72:08

== Personnel ==
- Alberto Naranjo - arranger, director, drums, timbales
- Pablo Ortiz - piano
- Jorge Del Pino - bass
- Julio Flores, Jorge Rivera, Horacio Mogollón, Evencio Villamizar, Bautista Vivas Chacón - saxes
- José Rodríguez, Agustín Valdés, Nelson Contreras, Figueredo Zerpa - trumpets
- César Pérez, Gilberto Betancourt, Oscar Mendoza, Antonio Ponte - trombones
- Gerardo Rosales - congas
- Antonio Rondón - bongo and percussion

== Vocals ==
- Juan José Capella (on 10.a, 12.a, 12.c)
- Arturo Guaramato (on (3, 10.c, 12.f)
- Carlos Espósito (on 6, 10.b, 12.d)
- Carlos Daniel Palacios (on 2, 4, 12.b)
- Javier Plaza (on 7, 12.e)

== Special guests ==
- Graciela Naranjo (vocals on track 13)
- Elisa Soteldo (vocals on track 13)

== Personnel on track 14 ==
- Luis Alfonzo Larrain - band leader
- Jesús Camacaro and/or Manuel Ramos, Efraín Leal, Luis Moros, César Viera, Rafael Albornoz, Enrique Palau, Joseph Kastz, Germán Muñoz - saxes
- Pablo Armitano and/or Cecilio Comprés, Ovidio Palaviccini, Luis Escalante, Pedro Chaparro, Rafael Velásquez, Juan S. Díaz - trumpets
- Marcos Ramos or Leopoldo Escalante, Filiberto Meléndez - trombone
- José Luis Paz or René Urbino, Willy Pérez - piano
- Antonio Ramos or Enrique Hernández, Alvaro Alvarez - bass
- George Lister or Francisco Hernández - drums
- Pedro Jeanton or José Rojas - congas
- Alfonso Contramaestre or Francisco Segovia - bongo

== Vocals on track 14 ==
- Celia Cruz (a)
- Tony Camargo (b)
- Luisín Landáez (d)

== Notes ==
- Tracks 1 through 13 were recorded between February and April 1998
- Songs included on track 14 were recorded in 1948 (a), 1952 (b), 1955 (c/d) and 1956 (e)

== Production ==
- Date of Recording: February - April 1998.
- Place of Recording: Caracas, Venezuela
- Mixing: Darío Peñaloza
- Label: Roberto Obeso & Federico Pacanins
- ID: 0004-98
