= Henry Martínez =

Henry Martínez may refer to:

- Henry Martínez (boxer) (born 1971), boxer from El Salvador
- Henry Martinez (fighter) (born 1983), American mixed martial artist
- Henry Martínez (songwriter) (1950–2025), Venezuelan musician and composer
