= Muaré =

Muare

Studio album by María Rivas
- Released: 1996
- Recorded: 1996
- Genre: Latin jazz/Vocal
- Length: 59:01
- Label: Angel Fall Production, Inc.
- Producer: Alberto Naranjo, Miguel Chacón

Muaré (pronounced moo-ah-REH) is an album by María Rivas.

The name is a Spanish term which is originated from moiré, is a proper title to define the intention of this album. For more over a decade, María Rivas has been evolving in a parallel manner to the multiform styles of pop, folk and jazz musics. One of the most intriguing and versatile Venezuelan vocalists, Rivas performs now a blend of jazz and Latin standards from the 1930s to the 1970s in a creative and sophisticated Latin jazz combo style arranged by Alberto Naranjo. Rivas plays around with the melodies without leaving them behind. In addition, the combo format is capable of producing a more detailed sound, which gave Naranjo more freedom in his arrangements. In Muare, the music ranges from danceable tracks and mood pieces to explorative works, with well conceived jazz ideas and a strong Latin beat as well.

== Track listing ==
1. "Night and Day" (C. Porter) 5:47
2. "Stardust" (H. Carmichael/M. Parrish) 5:26
3. "Watch What Happens" (M. Legrand) 4:40
4. "Noche de Ronda" (A. Lara) 5:26
5. "That Old Black Magic" (H. Arlen/J. Mercer) 4:08
6. "It Might as Well Be Spring" (R. Rodgers/O. Hammerstein) 5:02
7. "Bésame Mucho" (C. Velázquez) 4:17
8. "Blues in the Night" (H. Arlen/J. Mercer) 7:02
9. "Skylark" (H. Carmichael/J. Mercer) 4:07
10. "On the Street Where You Live" (A.J. Lerner/F. Loewe) 5:10
11. "Quién?" (A. Romero) 3:05
12. "Swing con Son" (B. Frómeta) 4:30

Credits

- María Rivas (vocals)
- Dino Nugent (acoustic piano)
- Gerardo Chacón (Ampeg baby bass)
- Alberto Naranjo (drums/timbales)
- Gerardo Rosales (congas)
- Antonio Rondón (bongos)
- José "Cheo" Rodríguez (trumpet/flugelhorn)
- Julio Flores (soprano, alto and tenor saxes)
- Evencio Villamizar (alto and tenor saxes)
- Horacio Mogollón (tenor and baritone saxes)
- Domingo Pagliuca (trombone)

Guest musicians

- Miguel Chacón (electric bass)
- Jorge Del Pino (acoustic bass/bongos)
- Pedro Eustache (flute)
- Alfredo Naranjo (vibes)
- Víctor Mestas (acoustic piano)
- Junior Romero (acoustic piano)
- Arrangements and musical direction by Alberto Naranjo
- Recorded at Estudios Intersonido and Larralde Studios in Caracas, Venezuela
