= Henry Martínez (songwriter) =

Venezuelan musician and songwriter (1950–2025)

- Born: February 13, 1950; Maracay, Aragua, Venezuela
- Died: October 2, 2025 (aged 75)
- Occupations: Musician, songwriter
- Notable work: Associated acts with Marc Anthony; Soledad Bravo; María Teresa Chacín; Ilan Chester; Guaco; Oscar D'León; Simón Díaz; Luis Laguna; Martirio; Rodolfo Mederos; Pablo Milanés; Morella Muñoz; Francisco Pacheco; Alí Primera; Jerry Rivera; Otmaro Ruíz; Cecilia Todd; Lilia Vera

Henry Martínez (February 13, 1950 – October 2, 2025) was a Venezuelan musician and songwriter. He was born in Maracay, the capital city of Aragua state.

== Life and career ==
Largely self-taught, Martínez learned to play acoustic guitar at an early age and received basic music training in his hometown between 1963 and 1968. Martínez also took private lessons with Aldemaro Romero and Luis Laguna, who incorporated him to his group Venezuela 4 in 1976.

In his early years, Martínez was influenced by diverse music genres such as latin and jazz. Particularly, he showed special interest for the characteristic chord progressions used by Brazilian guitarists such as Laurindo Almeida, Luiz Bonfá, Baden Powell and Bola Sete. Moreover, Martínez was impressed by the work of lyricists and songwriters like Antonio Carlos Jobim, Vinicius de Moraes, Silvio Rodríguez and Joan Manuel Serrat, in order to become a significant figure in avant-garde popular music of Venezuela.

Martínez is best known by his romantic songs A tu regreso, Hojarasca gris, Sentida canción, Si no te quisiera tanto, Tiempo de esperanza and Vénme a buscar, among others. He also wrote the music of Criollísima, a popular Venezuelan merengue which features the lyrics of his mentor Laguna.

In the early 1990s, Martínez moved to Miami, Florida, where he worked exclusively for Warner/Chappell Music, the global music publishing company of Warner Music Group. While at Warner, Martínez composed songs for Latino artists as Marc Anthony, Frankie Negrón, Jerry Rivera and Vélas, a female vocal group produced by musician Sergio George.

One of his most important albums is Cecilia Todd – Canciones de Henry Martínez, released in 2001, in which he contributed with 15 songs inspired by the geography of Venezuela. This album featured the special participation of the singer Gualberto Ibarreto and the bandoneonist Rodolfo Mederos in a handful of tunes.

Then in 2003, Martínez released his first studio album as singer-songwriter, Ya eres Abril, featuring the singer Martirio and the aforementioned Mederos as guest artists.

Besides his musical achievements, Martínez was a physician with a graduate degree in family medicine, a medical specialty devoted to comprehensive health care for people of all ages.

Martínez died on October 2, 2025, at the age of 75.
