= Inés Rivero =

Argentine model (born 1975)

- Born: María Inés Rivero; 18 August 1975 (age 51); Córdoba, Argentina
- Spouses: Jarl Ale de Basseville (m. 1993–1996) Jorge Mora (m. 2001)
- Modeling information
- Height: 5 ft 11 in (1.80 m)
- Hair color: Brown
- Eye color: Brown

María Inés Rivero (born 18 August 1975) is an Argentine model. She was discovered at 14 years old. She rose to prominence through her work as a Victoria’s Secret Angel and was shown on the covers of Elle, Vogue, Cosmopolitan, Fashion, Marie Claire, and Mirabella throughout different countries.

== Early life and family ==
Rivero was born in Argentina. She was raised in the town Cordoba, Argentina. Her mother is of Syrian and Jordanian descent, while her father is of Italian and Portuguese descent. Her mother enrolled her into a modeling school when she was a young girl. She made her modeling debut at the age of 14 at a local fashion show. An agent discovered Rivero through her modeling school at age 16 in her hometown, Cordoba. One year later, at age 17, she had a huge success when she won the "Elite Look of the Year" contest in Argentina.

== Career ==
Rivero’s big break came when she signed with Victoria’s Secret to become one of their notable Angels. An Angel contract helps models gain fame within the industry. Rivero joined the Victoria’s Secret Campaign in the late 1990s. She worked alongside of models like Heidi Klum, Adriana Lima, Alessandra Ambrosio, Tyra Banks, Karolina Kurkova, Daniela Pestova, Stephanie Seymour, Laetitia Casta and Karen Mulder. She was in what is considered to be the first wave of Angels for the company. Being the face for the brand meant that Rivero was used for all catalog work and got to walk in what has become one of the most watched events of the year. The Victoria’s Secret Fashion Show.

Last year in 2012, after nearly two decades of walking the runways and posing for photographers, Rivero decided to experience the other side of the modeling industry and joined the cast of the new reality show Model Latina South Beach, where ten Latina models will compete for a chance to win $25,000, a position as nuvoTV’s spokesperson, and a contract with international modeling agency, Q Management. The show premiered on 28 May 2012. She sits on the panel of judges for the show. During an interview in July 2012 Rivero spoke about her role on the show. She said, the most rewarding part of the experience is being able to pass on the lessons that she's learned as a model and help the young women grow in the industry.

Along with modeling and television Rivero also worked in the music industry. She recorded an album titled, Hasta Siempre. The hit single released off of it was "Che Guevara (Hasta Siempre)" which is written by Cuban composer Carlos Puebla about the Argentine-born revolutionary Che Guevara. Rivero also appeared in the movie The Devil Wears Prada (2006).

== Public image ==
Rivero is an advocate for women’s health. In a 2012 interview she spoke about the influence models have over women and the way they look at themselves and what people in her industry can do to make women feel more comfortable and confident in their own skin. Rivero believes that women get the wrong impression from the modeling industry, and think that they need to be as skinny as the models they see or that they need plastic surgery to look a certain way. She also says that men are more likely to be attracted to women who are natural, so instead of trying to cover up with makeup, she tells women to just be confident with who they are. Rivero recognizes the great influence that models have on women everywhere, and says, "I think we can inspire women by being healthy and in shape and showing off our bodies with confidence."

== Personal life ==
Ines Rivero was married to the photographer Ale de Basseville whom she divorced in 1996 in New York. Rivero used to reside in New York City and later moved to Miami Beach, Florida.

She married Cuban financer Jorge Mora. They welcomed their first child in 2001. Rivero was known for expressing in her interviews what healthy relationships need, based on her marriage with her husband. She said in an interview with Cupid’s Pulse that she and Mora know how to respect each other’s space and to always talk through their issues, explaining that "one of the first things we did was learn how to fight effectively, so that helped us through a lot of problems", further adding that "learning to talk about things is key, and we’re pretty good at it now.". Rivero divorced Mora in 2004.

In 2019 she was diagnosed with multiple sclerosis.

== Discography ==
=== Albums ===
- 1997: Hasta Siempre

=== Singles ===
- 1997: "Che Guevara (Hasta Siempre)" - peaked in FRA at #18
