= Otilio Galíndez =

Background information
- Born: December 13, 1935; Yaritagua, Yaracuy, Venezuela
- Died: June 13, 2009 (aged 73) Maracay, Aragua, Venezuela
- Genres: Aguinaldo, joropo, bambuco, nueva canción
- Occupations: Musician, songwriter, poet
- Formerly of: Lilia Vera

Otilio Galíndez (December 13, 1935 – June 13, 2009) was a Venezuelan songwriter and musician. He is best known for his aguinaldos (Christmas songs) like "La Restinga", even though he also composed popular Venezuelan waltzes, serenades, bambucos or joropos such as "Pueblos tristes", "Flor de mayo" and "Mi tripón". Many of his songs have been recorded by María Teresa Chacín, Ilan Chester, Simón Díaz, Pablo Milanés, Silvio Rodríguez, Mercedes Sosa, Cecilia Todd and Lilia Vera, among others.

Among his recordings are a solo album released in 1978 by Promus, El poeta Otilio Galíndez canta sus canciones, and an album recorded with his parrandón in 1983. Between 1979 and 1992, he worked for electricity company CADAFE, in Caracas.

Galíndez was a long-time resident of Maracay, living there from 1974 until the time of his death in 2009, at the age of 73.

== See also ==
- Venezuelan music
