= Los Cantos del Corazón =

Studio album by Graciela Naranjo and Estelita Del Llano
- Released: 1995

Graciela Naranjo chronology
Los Cantos del Corazón (1995)	El Legado (1998)

Los Cantos del Corazón is a 1995 album by Graciela Naranjo and Estelita Del Llano.

== Track listing ==
1. Presentación (D.D.) 0:21
2. Carrousel del Pasado (Ignacio Izcaray) 3:51
3. Intermedio (D.D.) 0:33
4. Uno (Marianito Mores / Enrique Santos Discépolo) 4:31
5. Conprendeme (María Alma) 4:31
6. Tú No Sospechas (Martha Valdés) 2:58
7. Verano (J. M. Mora / F. Gorrindo) 2:58
8. Franqueza (Consuelo Velázquez) 3:36
9. En la Soledad (Jesús Sanoja Rivero) 3:00
10. Mi Deuda de Amor (Adolfo Reyes / Armando Beltrán) 3:15
11. Humo en los Ojos (Agustín Lara) 3:55
12. Cita a las 6:00 / Ya son las 12:00 (Adolfo Salas / Juan Bruno Tarraza)3:26
13. Paraiso Soñado (Manuel Sánchez Acosta) 3:11
14. El Último Café (Stamponi / Castillo) 3:15
15. Ay Cariño (Federico Baena) 2:55
16. Ya me se tu Piel (Ignacio Izcaray) 3:09
17. Intermedio (D.D.) 0:30
18. Puro Teatro (Catalino Curet Alonso) 2:48
19. Quisiera (Luis Alfonzo Larrain) 2:10
20. Blancas Azucenas (Pedro Flores) 2:59
21. Tú Sabes (Taborda / J. Quiroz / E. Alvarez) 3:51
22. Potpurri (Como yo Quiero / Me Queda el Consuelo / Una Mujer Como Usted (Aldemaro Romero) 4:33
23. Humanidad / Fin (Alberto Domínguez / D.D.) 3:10

== Personnel ==
- Graciela Naranjo (vocals)
- Estelita Del Llano (vocals), maracas)
- Alberto Naranjo (arranger, director, timbales)
- Gustavo Carucí (bass, guitar, cuatro)
- Víctor Mestas (piano)
- Alexander Livinalli (percussion)

=== Guest stars ===
- Julio Flores (clarinet) on (2), (tenor sax) on (15)
- Julio Mendoza (trumpet) on (10)
- Rodolfo Reyes (flute) on (20)
- Domingo Sánchez Bór (cello) on (13)
- Salvador Soteldo (harmonica) on (4,8)

=== Special participation ===
- Orquesta Anacaona on (11)
- Carlos Gardel and Mona Maris on (3)
- Gilberto Pinto on (17)
- Aldemaro Romero piano and vocals on (22)

== Production ==
- Date of Recording: May - June 1995.
- Place of Recording: Caracas, Venezuela
- Label: Roberto Obeso & Federico Pacanins
