= Mambo Nights =

Studio album by Conexion Latina
- Released: September 11, 2000
- Label: Enja Records

Mambo Nights is a 2000 album from the Latin Jazz ensemble Conexion Latina. After the Venezuelan musician Alberto Naranjo had done some arrangements for the German salsa band, he was invited to participate as guest director for the recording of the band’s fourth CD, Mambo Nights. The leader of the legendary Trabuco Venezolano, Naranjo also contributed with two compositions and provided five arrangements, along with veterans arrangers Marty Sheller and Oscar Hernández. The voices of Javier Plaza, Osvaldo Fajardo and Yma America, and the guest soloists Dusko Goykovich and Bobby Shew, collaborated with the band to create a boiling festive sound for hard-salsa lovers.

== Track listing ==
No.	Title	Length
1.	"Mambo Nights" (O. Hernández)	3:51
2.	"Hace Rato" (R. Hernández)	5:29
3.	"Flotando en el Aire" (A. Martínez)	7:59
4.	"Felicidad" (H. Martínez)	7:06
5.	"Lotus Blossom" (K. Dorham)	5:00
6.	"Zapata" (J. Plaza)	5:35
7.	"Mambo a la Mintzer" (A. Naranjo)	5:14
8.	"Fiesta De Soneros" (A. Martínez)	5:24
9.	"Alna's Connexus" (A. Naranjo)	6:15
Total length:		51:53

Recorded in Munich, Germany between November 1999 and December 2000.
