= Los Cañoneros =

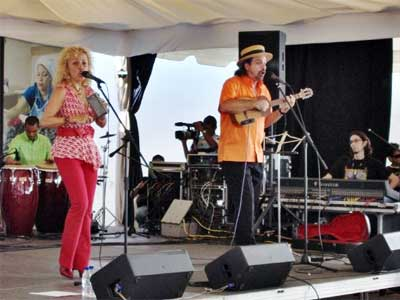
- Performing Live at Centro de Arte La Estancia

Background information
- Origin: Caracas, Distrito Capital, Venezuela
- Genres: Venezuelan music, Cañonera music
- Years active: 1982–present
- Label: Palacio de la Música
- Members: Hely Orsini; Ylich Orsini; Arnaldo Sánchez; Benjamín Brea; Andrés Romero; Salvador Sáez; Army Zerpa; Rafael Pino; Víctor Morles
- Past members: Augusto Rousset; Andrés Rousset
- Website: http://www.loscanoneros.net/

Los Cañoneros (English: The Cannoneers) is a Venezuelan cañonero group. It was created to emulate the times and songs of Caracas in 1920. They made their first public appearance in Mérida, in the Bullfighting Arena of Mérida November 20, 1982.

They were an overwhelming success in Caracas, enlivening parties and private shows. Then came the professionalization by recording several albums, performing on radio, and television. They are led by Hely and Ylich Orsini. They toured in Spain, Germany, Portugal and the Caribbean countries.

The "cañonera music" is a musical style born in the capital of Venezuela in the early 20th century. It is the first urban musical expression in this country. It has many similarities with the Dixieland developed in New Orleans. The groups that play "cañonera" music include several Venezuelan rhythms like the Venezuelan merengue, a variant of the pasodoble, joropo, and Venezuelan waltz.

As of 2017, there are only two groups dedicated to preserving the traditional music of Caracas: Los Antaños del Stadium (1946), and Los Cañoneros.

One of their most outstanding records is Esta es Caracas (2012), a Venezuelan merengue featuring some of the most important singers in Venezuela: Cecilia Todd, Horacio Blanco (lead vocal for the ska band Desorden Publico), Ramsés Meneses a.k.a. McKlopedia, Aristides Barbella (Malanga), Max Pizzolante, Francisco Pacheco and Serenata Guayanesa. Their more successful songs include El Besaor "The Kisser", La Burra "The Donkey", La Ruperta ", El Romantón and Merengueadera.

In January 2025 they received the "Glorias Artísticas de Venezuela 2024" award, given by the government to artists with more than 20 years of outstanding career.

== Additional sources ==
- Press release of the Ministry of Culture(Spanish)
- VenezuelaDemo (PDF)
