= El Trabuco Venezolano Vol. II =

Studio album by El Trabuco Venezolano

Studio album by El Trabuco Venezolano
- Released: 1979
- Recorded: 1979
- Genre: Jazz band, Latin American music
- Length: 44:21
- Label: YVKCT con músiC.A.
- Producer: Orlando Montiel

El Trabuco Venezolano chronology
El Trabuco Venezolano Vol. I	El Trabuco Venezolano Vol. II	El Trabuco Venezolano Vol. III

El Trabuco Venezolano – Vol. II is a vinyl LP by Venezuelan musician Alberto Naranjo, originally released in 1979 and partially reedited in two CD albums titled El Trabuco Venezolano 1977 – 1984 Vol. 1 (1994) and Vol. 2 (1995). It is the second of seven albums (two live albums) of the El Trabuco Venezolano musical project arranged and directed by Naranjo.

== Track listing ==
#	Song	Composer(s)	Vocal(s)	Solo(s)	Time
	Introducción	Alberto Naranjo	Sonero Clásico	Chocolate Armenteros, Carlos Guerra	1:07
A1	Imágenes Latinas	Bernardo Palombo; Andy González	Palacios	Hernández; J. Velázquez; Rengifo	8:23
A2	Mi versión	Sylvia Rexach	Rodríguez	Briceño	4:23
A3	Don Simón	Víctor Gutiérrez	Daubeterre	Silva (tub)	6:43
B4	Boleros Venezolanos		Vladimir Lozano		6:58
a	Soñando despierto	Aníbal Abreu
b	Me queda el consuelo	Aldemaro Romero		Freire (ten)
c	No volveré a encontrarte	Carlos J. Maytín		Caminiti (ac. p)
B5	Tiene Saoco	Ricardo Quintero	R. Quintero	R. Velázquez (tr)	4:31
B6	El Cumaco de San Juan	Francisco D. Pacheco	Ruiz	Briceño, Quintero on Interlude; Naranjo (dr) on Coda	7:14
				Total time	44:21

== Personnel ==
- Alberto Naranjo – drums, arranger, director on all tracks;
  tympani on 1, Colombian percussion on 3
- Eduardo Cabrera – acoustic piano on 1
- Lucio Caminiti – piano on 2 (electric), 4 (acoustic)
- José Ortiz – acoustic piano on 3, 5, 6
- José Velásquez – bass guitar on 1, 2, 4, 5
- Carlos Acosta bass guitar on 3
- Lorenzo Barriendos bass guitar on 6
- Frank Hernández – timbales on 1, 5, 6
- Felipe Rengifo – congas on all tracks
- Jesús Quintero – bongos on all tracks
- Luis Arias – trumpet (lead) on all tracks except on 4 and 5
- José Díaz F. – trumpet on 1, flugel horn on 2, 3, 6
- Alfredo Gil – trumpet on 1, 3, lead on 5, flugel on 2
- Luis Lewis Vargas – trumpet on 1, 5, 6
- Rafael Velázquez – trumpet on 2, 5, flugel on 3
- Manolo Pérez – trumpet on 6
- Rodrigo Barboza – trombone on 1, 2, 3, 6
- Leopoldo Escalante – trombone on 1, 5, 6
- Rafael Silva – trombone on 2, 5; Wagner tuba on 3
- Héctor Hurtado – trombone on 1
- José Plaza – trombone on 2, 3
- Angelo Pagliuca – trombone on 5, 6
- Carlos Daniel Palacios – lead singer on 1 and chorus
- Carlín Rodríguez – lead singer on 2 and chorus
- Moisés Daubeterre – lead singer on 3 and chorus
- Ricardo Quintero – lead singer on 5 and chorus
- Joe Ruiz – lead singer on 6 and chorus

=== Guest musicians ===
- Sonero Clásico del Caribe on Introduction
  - Pedro Aranda – acoustic guitar
    José Castro – bass
    Carlos Landaeta – clave
    Evaristo León – bongos
    Johnny Pérez – maracas
    José R. Soto – 1st voice
    Santiago Tovar – 2nd voice and Cuban tres
    Carlos Guerra (Sr) - trumpet
- Alfredo (Chocolate) Armenteros – trumpet on Introduction
- Rolando Briceño – tenor sax on 2, 3, 6
- Leo Quintero – guitar on 2 (acoustic), 6 (electric)
- Cruz M. Arraiz – baritone sax on 3, 6
- Alvaro Serrano – Colombian percussion on 3
- Ezequiel Serrano – Colombian percussion on 3
- Rosalba Chiquiar – female choir on 3
- Otilia Rodríguez – female choir on 3
- Vladimir Lozano – lead vocalist on 4
- Manuel Freire – soprano, alto, tenor and baritone saxes;
  C flute, G flute, clarinet and bass clarinet (all dubbed) on 4
- Strings section on 4
  - Violins: Alberto Flamini (concertmaster), Carmelo Russo, Sigfrido Chiva, Grigorije Girovski,
    Bogdan Biegniewski, Inocente Carreño, Sigfrido Chiva, Boris Jivkov, Alejandro Ramírez
  - Violas: Francisco Molo, José Olmedo
  - Cellos: Lauren Levenson, Bodgan Trochanowski
  - Harp: Alba Quintanilla

=== Technical personnel ===
- Artistic director: Domingo Alvarez
- Associate producer: César Miguel Rondón
- Executive producer: Orlando Montiel
- Musical director: Alberto Naranjo
- Staff coordinator: Freddy Sanz
- Cover design: Alvaro Sotillo
- Photos: Fernando Sánchez
- Label:YVKCT con músiC.A. YVL-005
- Print: Editorial Arte
- Place of Recording: Estudios Sono Dos Mil
- Recording engineer: Ricardo Landaeta – Alejandro Cornejo (assistant)
- Mastering: Robert C. Ludwig (Masterdisk, New York)
- Produced in Caracas, Venezuela, 1979
