= Luis Larraín (disambiguation) =

Luis Larraín (Luis Larraín Stieb, 1980–2023) was a Chilean LGBT rights activist.

Luis Larraín may also refer to:

- Luis Larraín Arroyo (born 1956), Chilean economist and politician, director of the National Planning Office
- Luis Larraín Prieto (1858–1939), Chilean politician, minister of agriculture
- Luis Alfonzo Larrain (1911–1996), Venezuelan musician and composer

== See also ==
- Larraín family
