= Grupo Mango =

The Grupo Mango is a salsa music band based in Caracas, Venezuela, which was established in 1975. Since then, the group has been an emblematic part of the Venezuelan salsa scene. The group, once organized into an official orchestra, was reduced to a sextet. Their first album remains one of the most complete productions ever done in the whole of salsa.

Mango performs original songs, and its style is based on the salsa dura fundamentals including traces of jazz and pop, as well a few slight nods to the music of Cal Tjader and Joe Cuba. The first established members were Moisés Daubeterre (vocals and piano), Freddy Roldán (vibraphone), Argenis Carmona (bass guitar), José Navarro (timbales), Gustavo Quinto (congas) and Luis Gamboa (bongó). Shortly thereafter Joe Ruiz (vocals) joined the group.

During its existence, the group has shared stage with artists like Soledad Bravo, Willie Colón, Chick Corea, Dimensión Latina, Sexteto de Joe Cuba and Trabuco Venezolano, among others. Besides, Mango was awarded by Record World magazine in 1976 as the best sextet of the year.

In the years that followed lineup changes were common. Nevertheless, the Grupo Mango has preserved its original sound while the essence of their music remains intact.

== Selected discography ==
| Year | Title | Label | Ref |
|---|---|---|---|
| 1975 | Mango 75 | CBS-Columbia | |
| 1976 | Mango 76 | CBS-Columbia | |
| 1979 | Mango 79 | Integra | |
| 1980 | Lo Mejor De Mango | CBS-Columbia | |
| 1981 | Lo Mejor De Mango Vol. II | CBS-Columbia | |
| 1981 | Mango 81 | Integra | |
| 1983 | Mango 83 | Sono-Rodven | |
| 1998 | Puro Mango | CBS-Columbia | |
