= Cosas del Alma =

Studio album by Adalberto Santiago
- Recorded: 1984
- Genre: vocal Latin American music
- Length: 41:56
- Label: WS Latino
- Producer: Ray Santos

Cosas del Alma is a studio album by Adalberto Santiago recorded in 1984, and re-issued in 2002.

== Track listing ==
#	Song	Composer(s)	Time
1	Alma Con Alma	Juanito Márquez	4:30
2	Dueña de Mi Corazón	José (Pepé) Delgado	3:33
3	Mi Propio Yo	Chelique Sarabia	4:05
4	Medley		4:18
a-	El Día Que Me Quieras	Carlos Gardel / Alfredo Le Pera	
b-	Uno	M. Mores / E. Santos Discépolo	
5	Quédate Conmigo	José (Pepé) Delgado	4:06
6	Medley		3:52
a-	Cada Vez Más	René Touzet	
b-	La Noche de Anoche	René Touzet	
7	Cosas del Alma	José (Pepé) Delgado	3:52
8	Cuando Te Dejé de Querer	José Carbó Menéndez	3:24
9	No Somos Nada	(D.D)	4:30
10	Delirio	César Portillo de la Luz	4:45
		Total Time	41:56

== Credits ==
- Adalberto Santiago (vocals)
- Gilberto Colón (piano)
- Bob Quaranta (keyboard)
- Luis Colón (bass)
- Steve Sacks (baritone sax/flute)
- Leonel Sánchez/Héctor "Bomberito" Zarzuela/Ite (trumpet)
- Harry De Aguiar/Ángel "Cuqui" Lebrón (trombone)
- Noey Matos (bongos)
- Félix Cruz (congas)
- Paul "Poly" Irlanda (timbales)
- Cyro Baptista (percussion)
- Isidro Infante (musical direction)

== Arrangements ==
- Gilberto Colón
- Alberto Naranjo
- Tito Puente
- Steve Sacks
- Ray Santos

== Other credits ==
- Producer: Ray Santos
- Label: WS Latino. WS-4163, 2002

== Sources ==
- Album cover credits
