= Luisín Landáez =

- Birth name: Luis Felipe Landáez Requena
- Born: 17 August 1931; Higuerote, Venezuela
- Died: 16 November 2008 (aged 77); Peñalolén, Santiago, Chile
- Genres: Cumbia, guaracha
- Occupation: Singer

Luis Felipe Landáez Requena (17 August 1931, Higuerote, Venezuela – 16 November 2008, Peñalolén, Santiago, Chile) was a Venezuelan-Chilean cumbia singer who was popular in Chile for his songs "La piragua" and "Macondo".

== Biography ==
=== Early life and career ===
Born in Higuerote on 17 August 1931, Landáez moved to Caracas when he was little. As a young man, he worked in his family's mechanical workshop, while at night he worked on music. On 8 August 1953, he won a song contest in Caracas with a song called "Billos Busca Sintantes", which served as a springboard to professionally dedicating himself to singing. He began his professional career at the age of 21, as a crooner of different orchestras: Manuel Ramos, Casablanca, Caracas Swing Boys and Arnoldo Nali. After participating in some musical groups, such as Billo's Caracas Boys and Luis Alfonzo Larrain's Orchestra, he began his solo career at the end of the 1950s.

=== As a soloist ===
In 1960, Landáez toured Colombia, Ecuador, Peru, and Chile. The latter arrived on May 30, 1962 and joined the tour of many nueva ola artists. He eventually decided to settle in Chile and became a musical icon, recording 45 cumbia albums. He decided to return to Chile in 1974, where he married for the second time Alicia Vera, a young officer of Carabineros, who came from Santiago; they had four sons, Luis Felipe, Pedro, Pablo and Juan. In 1975, he left for Caracas to enter a new stage of his career playing bolero, alternating his labor commitments between Venezuela and Chile. In the 1980s, he tried to relaunch his career in Chile by making several shows in Festival de la una, led by Enrique Maluenda, without reaching the fame enjoyed in the 1970s. In the early 90s, Landáez re-acquired relevance when he was invited to participate in a new version of his classic "(Los Cien Años de) Macondo", made by the group Sexual Democracia. The rejuvenated song was very well received. After the breakup of his last marriage in 2000, Landáez settled in Chile, performing until 2004.

=== Controversy with Tommy Rey ===
In December 2004, he accused La Sonora de Tommy Rey of cheapening the profession of singing by charging $500,000 per show. The lead singer, Patricio Zúñiga (professionally known as Tommy Rey), responded to these criticisms by describing Landáez as an "envious old fool".

=== Death ===
On 16 November 2008, after staying two weeks in the Hospital Doctor Luis Tisné in Peñalolén, Landáez died at the age of 77 from cardiac arrest. During his life, he married five times and had 13 children. At the time of his death, he also suffered from diabetes and kidney problems. The wake was held at the Parish of La Asunción, and on 18 November, he was buried in the Mausoleum of the Artists, located in the Cementerio General de Santiago.

== See also ==
- Cumbia
