= Juan Bautista Plaza =

Venezuelan classical composer (1898–1965)

Juan Bautista Plaza

Juan Bautista Plaza Alfonso (Caracas, Venezuela June 19, 1898 – 1965) was a classical composer. He began studies in medicine at the Central University of Venezuela but, with time, left in order to dedicate himself to music. His first teacher was Jesus Maria Suárez. He studied in Rome from 1920 and 1923 and obtained the title of professor of sagrada (sacred) composition. After his return to Venezuela he was named Master of Chapel at Caracas Cathedral and carried out this position until the year 1948. In the Caracas Superior Music School he taught music history and appreciation to composer Antonio Lauro and singer Morella Muñoz.

== Legacy ==
The most important compositions of Juan Bautista Plaza were El picacho abrupto, Poema Sinfónico, Cantata de Navidad, Las campanas de Pascua, Las horas, La fuente abandonada, soprano y orquesta, Poema lírico Vigilia, Fuga criolla y Fuga romántica, Elegía para orquesta y timbal, and Elegía para corno inglés and cuarteto de arcos. He also wrote notable religious music (e.g., Misa en fa, Misa de la esperanza, Requiem a la meoria de su madre) and music for the piano (e.g., Sonatina venezolana, Cuatro ritmos de danza). His popular song El Curruchá is a well-known example of joropo. Plaza's pupils include Alba Quintanilla.

The National Library of Venezuela has a room named after him.

== See also ==
- Venezuela
- Venezuelan music
