= Oblación =

Studio album by Alberto Naranjo & Latin Jazz 8
- Released: 1994
- Recorded: 1994
- Genre: Jazz, Latin American, Venezuelan folklore
- Length: 70:33
- Label: Obeso & Pacanins 1994-001
- Producer: Alberto Naranjo

Alberto Naranjo & Latin Jazz 8 chronology
Imagen Latina	Oblación	Swing con Son

Oblación is a 1994 album by Venezuelan musician Alberto Naranjo.

== Personnel ==
- Alberto Naranjo – arrangements, direction, drums, percussion
- Víctor Mestas – acoustic piano
- Gustavo Carucí – electric bass
- Julio Flores – soprano, alto and baritone saxophones
- Rodolfo Reyes – alto and tenor saxophones, flute
- Oscar Mendoza – trombone
- Alexander Livinalli – percussion
- Vladimir Quintero – percussion

== Special guests ==
- Rafael Velásquez (trumpet on 4, 6, 8)
- José Ortiz (piano on 6)
- Huguette Contramaestre (lead vocalist on 6, 7, 12)
- Fusión IV: Ilba Rojas, Adriana Portales, Kodiak Agüero and José Mena (vocal group on 12)

== Track listing ==
#	Song	Solo(s)	Time
1	La Novena	Reyes, Mestas, Naranjo	4:20
2	Oblación	Flores (bar)	4:46
3	La Canción de Livi	Mendoza, Carucí, Livinalli	8:30
4	Un Calipso para Isidora	Mestas	4:59
5	Keechimbah	Flores (alt), Reyes (ten)	5:12
6	Desesperanza/Sueños	Contramaestre, Velásquez, Ortiz, Naranjo	8:35
7	Mood Indigo	Contramaestre, Mestas	5:50
8	Blues and the Abstract Truth	Flores (alt), Velásquez, Reyes (ten), Mestas	4:48
9	Al Sur del Lago	Reyes (ten)	6:05
10	The Freak	Flores (alt), Mestas	7:52
11	Rancho Central	Flores (alt/bar)	4:23
12	María		5:00
	a]-Fughetta	Fusión IV (a cappella)	
	b]-Traditional chant	Contramaestre; Livinalli, Quintero	
		Total time	71:17

- All songs composed and arranged by Alberto Naranjo, except:
  - Desesperanza, composed by María Luisa Escobar and arranged by Naranjo
  - Mood Indigo, composed by Duke Ellington, Irving Mills and Barney Bigard and
    arranged by Naranjo; Johnny Hodges' original solo orchestrated by Naranjo
  - Blues and the Abstract Truth, composed and arranged by Oliver Nelson and
    orchestrated by Naranjo
  - María (a), composed by Leonardo Silva Beauregard and orchestrated by Naranjo

== Other credits ==
- Recorded and mixed by Agustín [Augie] Verde at Estudios Intersonido in Caracas, Venezuela
- Date of recording: August 1994
- Musical producer: Alberto Naranjo
- Executive producers: Roberto Obeso and Federico Pacanins
- Graphic design/Illustrations: Luisa F. Almeida/Ernesto León
- Cover photo: Luis Salmerón
