= Lilia Vera =

Venezuelan folk singer (born 1951)

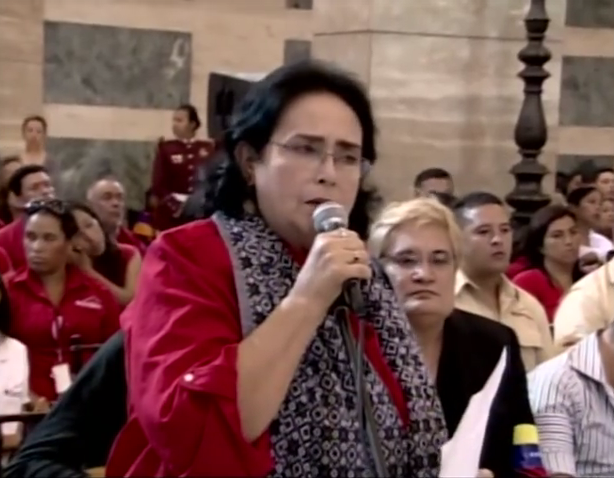

Background information
- Born: Lilia Ramírez Villamizar; October 19, 1951 (age 74); Caracas, Venezuela
- Genre: Venezuelan folklore
- Years active: 1972–present

Lilia Ramírez Villamizar (born October 19, 1951), known as Lilia Vera, is a venezuelan singer, whose contemporary folk music range is inspired by traditional Venezuelan genres and songs of protest or social justice.

== Biography ==
=== Early years ===
Born in Caracas, Lilia Vera started performing at an early age, singing popular Venezuelan music on local television and radio shows destined for the young audience. As a teenager, she became involved with a variety of social causes early in her life, including civil rights and non-violence. She then turned to singing in public places, colleges and universities in 1972 until becoming part of the Nueva canción, a new song movement of Latin America, which was to spread throughout the Caribbean, Central and South America in the 1970s and 1980s. Successful artists of the genre such as Soledad Bravo, Victor Jara, Violeta Parra, Mercedes Sosa. Atahualpa Yupanqui and Alfredo Zitarrosa inspired the way forward for Vera, as she said in an interview with folk historian Rafael Salazar. In addition to performing a repertoire of significant Venezuelan songwriters, Vera pledged allegiance to these artists, in part because they represent key figures in the new movement but also because she performed some songs of their extensive repertoire. Similarly, she was a founding member of both the International Committee of the New Latin American Song and the National Federation of Popular Culture in Venezuela.

=== Professional singer ===
In 1974 Vera made her self-titled debut album for Talirai, an independent label founded by Lilia, together with her companion Alberto Vera and the culture promoter Oswaldo Lares. The album was entitled Lilia Vera, plain and simple. By then, fame and popularity were not important to her. Instead, she earned the more important qualities of respect and admiration from her peers. On this album, Vera sang emotional renditions of "Caramba", "Pueblos tristes", "Duerme, mi tripón", "Flor de Mayo" and "Pajarillo verde", all composed by musician and poet Otilio Galíndez, making an immediate impact on new audiences or existing ones. All these are factors in her art no less potent than his sensitive voice, and the total effect to establish an intimacy with her audience which even an unfamiliar musical language cannot strain.

At this time, Vera received further vocal training in Caracas then was signed by the Promus record label, where she recorded two albums in 1976 (Lilia Vera Vol. 2 and 3) and one in 1977 (Vol. 4). While at Promus, she interpreted songs composed by musicians and songwriters Alberto Arvelo Torrealba, Simón Díaz, Conny Méndez and Luis Mariano Rivera, as well as the aforementioned Galíndez, among others. Vera later returned to Promus and released her album Lilia Vera Vol. 5 in 1983, in which she recorded the traditional tune "Tonada", compiled by the veteran harpist Indio Figueredo, as well as a handful of songs composed by new songwriters. Overall, in these four records she scored hits with songs as diverse as "El becerrito", "Chucho y Ceferina", "Clavelito Colorado", "Arbolito sabanero", "Lucerito", "La culebra" and "Canchunchú dichoso".

In between, Vera collaborated with Simón Díaz in his record Duetos (1998), with Ilan Chester in Ofrenda para un niño (1999), and with Magdalena Sánchez in Duetos de leyenda (1999).

Her most significant international performance was in 1981, when she recorded a duet album along with Pablo Milanés to perform a repertoire consisting of traditional Venezuelan songs and Cuban Nueva trova. The record was produced by the Areito label (Cuba) and co-produced by Interamericana de Grabaciones (Venezuela). Recorded at EGREM studios in La Habana, the record was pressed at 33 ⅓ rpm and was titled originally Lilia Vera y Pablo Milanés. It was reissued in CD format in 1998 by Universal Music Latino and was renamed Pablo Milanés – Con Lilia Vera.

Lilia Vera is still active in concerts and shows. Through the years, most of her early albums have been released on CD.
