= El Trabuco Venezolano Vol. IV =

Studio album by El Trabuco Venezolano

Studio album by El Trabuco Venezolano
- Released: 1984
- Recorded: 1984
- Genre: Jazz band, Latin American music
- Length: 41:45
- Label: Jerm'z Records
- Producer: Orlando Montiel; Alberto Naranjo

El Trabuco Venezolano chronology
Irakere & Trabuco – En Vivo, Poliedro de Caracas, Mayo 15' 81	El Trabuco Venezolano Vol. IV	Imagen Latina

El Trabuco Venezolano Vol. IV is a studio vinyl LP by Venezuelan musician Alberto Naranjo, originally released in 1984 and partially reedited in two CDs titled El Trabuco Venezolano 1977 - 1984' Vol. 1 (1994) and Vol. 2 (1995). It is the sixth of seven albums (two live albums) of the El Trabuco Venezolano musical project arranged and directed by Naranjo. The “art” cover include an article, signed by Humberto Márquez, entitled La flor y nata (crème de la crème or creme of the crop), which is also used to refer to this LP.

== Personnel ==
- Alberto Naranjo - drums, arranger, director on all tracks;
  timbales (dubbed) on tracks 2, 3, 5, 6
- Samuel del Real - piano on all tracks
- Lorenzo Barriendos - bass guitar on all tracks, except on 2
- José Velázquez - bass guitar on track 2
- José Navarro - timbales on tracks 1, 4, 7, 8
- Orlando Poleo - congas on all tracks, except on 2
- Felipe Rengifo - congas on track 2, quinto on track 8
- William Mora - bongos on all tracks, except on 2
- Jesús Quintero - bongos on track 2
- Gustavo Aranguren - trumpet or flugel horn in all tracks
  (four parts, dubbed - flugels only on track 2)
- Rafael Silva - trombone on all tracks
  (three parts, dubbed - four parts on track 8)
- Carlos Daniel Palacios - lead singer on tracks 1, 8 and chorus on 3, 7
- Ricardo Quintero - lead singer on track 2
- Joe Ruiz - lead singer on tracks 3, 7 and chorus on 7, 8
- Carlos Espósito - lead singer on track 5 and chorus on 3, 7, 8

== Guests ==
- Pedro Vilela - Puerto Rican cuatro on track 1
- Víctor Jiménez - lead singer on track 6
- Los Cuñaos (directed by Alí Agüero) - chorus on all tracks, except on 4
- Manuel Freire - saxophone on track 4
  (five parts: soprano, alto, 2 tenors, baritone; all dubbed)
- Strings section on all tracks, except on 4
  - Violins: Alberto Flamini (concertmaster), Carmelo Russo, Sigfrido Chiva, Grigorije Girovski,
    Angel Gimeno, Luciano Stecconi, Giulio Remersaro, Nil Nicolau
  - Violas: José Olmedo, Osane Ibáñez
  - Cellos: Bogdan Trochanowski, Mario Arias

== Track listing ==
#	Song	Composer(s)	Vocal(s)	Solo(s)	Time
A1	No me engañas	Pablo Cairo	C. D. Palacios	Vilela	4:17
A2	Rosa de la noche	Mariela Romero; Angel Melo	Ricardo Quintero		6:34
A3	Brujería	Napoleón Baltodano	J. Ruiz		4:54
A4	Alna Blues	Alberto Naranjo	Instrumental	Aranguren, Silva, Freire (ten), Navarro	5:09
B5	Desilusión	Juan Vicente Torrealba	C. Espósito	Del Real	8:18
B6	A pesar de usted	Chico Buarque	Víctor Jiménez		3:56
B7	La orquesta de moda	José Navarro	J. Ruiz	Naranjo (dm)	4:56
B8	No quiero confusión	José Luis Cortés	C. D. Palacios	Rengifo	4:56
				Total time	43:48

== Other credits ==
- Artistic and executive producer: Orlando Montiel
- Musical director and associate producer: Alberto Naranjo
- Production manager: Rafael Rivas
- Staff coordinator: Freddy Sanz
- Photos: Mario Abate (cover) and Orlando Montiel (back)
- Texts: Humberto Márquez (cover) and Lil Rodríguez (back)
- Label: Jerm'z Records C. A. - LPJ/CJ-3222 (P)
- Place of Recording: Estudios Audio Suárez
- Recording and mixing engineers: Gustavo and Mario Quintero M. and Alberto Naranjo
- Produced in Caracas, Venezuela, 1984
