= Alberto Naranjo =

Venezuelan musician (1941–2020)

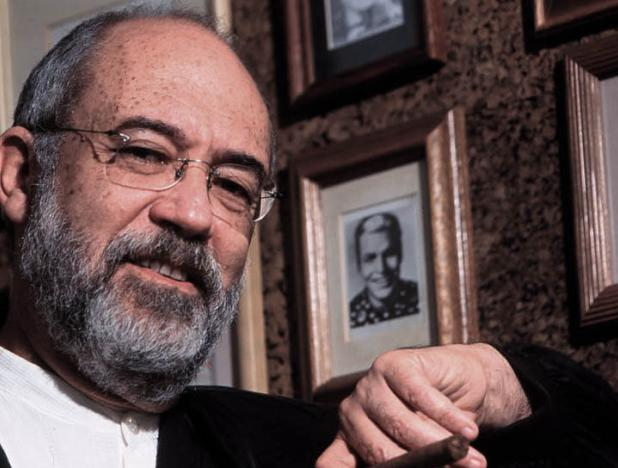

Background information
- Birth name: Jorge Alberto Naranjo del Pino
- Born: September 14, 1941; Caracas, Venezuela
- Origin: Venezuelan
- Died: January 27, 2020 (aged 78); Caracas
- Genres: Jazz, Latin genres
- Occupation(s): Arranger, composer, music director
- Instrument(s): Drum kit, percussion, timbales
- Years active: 1959–2019
- Labels: Integra, Roberto Obeso & Federico Pacanins

Alberto Naranjo [nah-rahn'-ho] (September 14, 1941 – January 27, 2020) was a Venezuelan musician. His mother, the singer Graciela Naranjo, was a radio, film and television pioneer in her homeland. Largely self-taught, Naranjo embarked on a similar musical course, becoming – like his mother – one of Venezuela's icons of contemporary popular music.

== Career ==
In his early years, Naranjo was influenced by diverse music genres such as jazz and classical, from Louis Armstrong to Duke Ellington and Oliver Nelson; from Bud Powell to Thad Jones and Mel Lewis; from Béla Bartók to Claude Debussy, and specially, the music created by Tito Puente, one of the greatest all-time Latin jazz leaders. Puente revolutionised the role of the drums in stage performance, when he moved the drum kit and timbales from the back to the front of stage, highlighted it as a solo instrument, and demonstrated that a drummer can also be a gifted composer and arranger.

=== 1959–1969 ===
With Puente as his role model, Naranjo started professionally as a drummer at age 18, playing with several local dance bands including Chucho Sanoja (1963–64), Los Melódicos (1965–66) and Porfi Jiménez (1966–67). A valuable sideman as well, he was adaptable to many different styles, including bossa nova, jazz, Latin, pop and rock genres, being able to fit smoothly into the group in which he was playing. Later in the 1960s, he was focused exclusively in studio sessions becoming one of the sought after musicians in his country.

=== 1970–1979 ===
Since 1970, Naranjo remained busy and performed on countless recording sessions. Besides this, he toured extensively, became a member of the Radio Caracas Television orchestra, and backed up significant artists touring in Venezuela, among others Charles Aznavour, Cándido Camero, Vikki Carr, Eddie Fisher, Lucho Gatica, Engelbert Humperdinck, Julio Iglesias, Tom Jones, the Nicholas Brothers, Eliana Pittman, The Platters, Tito Rodríguez, Ornella Vanoni and Pedro Vargas. In addition, he emerged as a record producer and jingles creator, as well as a leader and mentor of both young and veteran performers.

In 1977, Alberto Naranjo founded the prominent orchestra El Trabuco Venezolano, in which he quickly achieved notable success as arranger and leader. The term trabuco comes from Venezuelan baseball slang, where it means an all-stars selection of ballplayers coming from different clubs, or bands, if it is the case, in musical terms. The orchestra was created by Naranjo in response to the emergence of a plethora of salsa amateurish bands, that often offered pale imitations of foreign groups, as he wanted to start a total musical movement with all-round musicians and singers. As a result, his Trabuco had no specific commercial ambitions and was ideated to record and perform at cultural events in theaters and universities, and although Naranjo never intended to be a salsa interpreter, the band overlapped considerably with salsa music. But in his jazzy arrangements, Naranjo did not use the typical 'minor' percussion salsa instruments, like maracas, güiro and claves, so he worked with a classic jazz drum set, congas, bongos, timbales, piano and bass in front of four trumpets and four trombones, similar to jazz brass band ensembles, not at all common in salsa bands. Eventually, five saxophones, an electric guitar or a string section were added to the format. Over the years, El Trabuco Venezolano toured, made five studio recordings and recorded two live albums with the Cuban group Irakere led by pianist Chucho Valdés. Notably, both groups performed on stage together several times.

In the late 1970s, Naranjo was the drummer on Tito Puente's concert orchestra during a salsa all-star international concert tour that included Celia Cruz, Ray Barretto, Héctor Lavoe and Adalberto Santiago. Besides this, Naranjo became an active participant and collaborator in several local movements like jazz, bossa nova, rock and Venezuelan genres, and emerged as a top-notch arranger.

=== 1980–2020 ===
Naranjo made arrangements for the groups Conexion Latina, Guaco and Mango; pop-artists like Ilan Chester, Simón Díaz, Oscar D'León, Ricardo Montaner, María Rivas, Aldemaro Romero and Adalberto Santiago, among others, and also performed with jazz people such as Jeff Berlin, Dusko Goykovich, Danilo Pérez, Arturo Sandoval, Bobby Shew and Dave Valentin.

Besides, the Trabuco and other bands that Naranjo led alternated with musicians like Barbarito Diez, Estrellas de Areito, Larry Harlow, Eddie Palmieri, Son 14 and Chucho Valdés. In this period he also toured through Europe, Latin America and the United States.

Since the 1990s, Naranjo was an active participant in diverse artistic and musical outreach endeavors of Venezuela, not only as a player, but also as an historian, educator, and urban chronicler on radio, books and newspapers.

== Awards and nominations ==
- 1973 : IX Festival de la Canción (Venezuela). Best arrangement.
- 1976 : IV Festival Internacional de la Canción de Puerto Rico. Best arrangement.
- 1992 : Grammy Award nomination. Best instrumental composition for a motion picture (The Mambo Kings, orchestration).
- 1992 : Premio Nacional del Artista (Casa del Artista, Venezuela). Best Orchestrator of the Year.

== Recognitions ==
- 1988 : 1st Caracas Jazz Festival. Honored for his contribution to the development of jazz in Venezuela.
- 1995 : Órden Samán de Aragua (Venezuela). Honored for his 35 years of artistic performance.
- 2017 : Both Naranjo and his orchestra El Trabuco Venezolano were recognized with the title of Cultural Heritage of Venezuela; a distinction granted by the Venezuelan State to artistic creators who through their tireless and dedicated work have contributed to the projection of the Venezuelan cultural heritage
- 2018 : Naranjo was awarded an honorary doctorate degree at the Universidad Nacional Experimental de las Artes (UNEARTE) for his contribution in the areas of music and cultural promotion for more than fifty years.

== Discography ==
- Dulce y Picante
- Imagen Latina
- Oblación
- Swing con Son
- El Trabuco Venezolano Vol. I
- El Trabuco Venezolano Vol. II
- El Trabuco Venezolano Vol. III
- El Trabuco Venezolano Vol. IV
- El Trabuco Venezolano Vol. V
- Irakere & Trabuco, Vol. 1
- Irakere & Trabuco, Vol. 2
- "El Trabuco Venezolano (Mix 1) on YouTube

== Selected contributions ==
- Arturo Sandoval & the Latin Jazz Orchestra
- Los Cantos del Corazón
- Cosas Del Alma
- I Remember Clifford
- The Mambo Kings
- Mambo Nights
- Muaré

== Others ==
- Aldemaro Romero Jazz
- ARTuro Sandoval
- Café Latino
- Después de la Tormenta
- Frank Quintero y Los Balzeaguaos
- El Venezolano
- La Conexion
- La Retreta Mayor
- La Salsa es mi Vida
- Los Cuñaos
- Los Kenya
- Grupo Mango
- Nu-Sound Of Bossa Lounge
- Oscar D' León Live
- Simón Díaz Universal
- Strive for Higher Realities
- The Message
- The Rough Guide to the Music of Venezuela
- Tulio Enrique León Internacional
