= Adalberto Santiago =

Puerto Rican musician (born 1937)

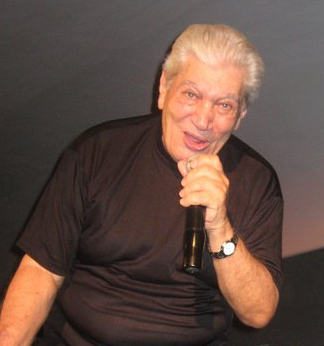
- Santiago in 2011

Background information
- Also known as: The Puerto Rican Elvis Presley, Mr. Dinamita
- Born: Adalberto Santiago Berrios; April 23, 1937 (age 89); Ciales, Puerto Rico
- Genres: Salsa
- Occupation: Musician
- Instruments: Bass; Guitar; Guiro; Maracas
- Years active: 1956–present
- Labels: Fania; Inca Records; Cotique Records

Adalberto Santiago (born April 23, 1937) is an internationally known salsa singer.

== Career ==
Born April 23, 1937, in Pozas barrio, Ciales, Puerto Rico, Adalberto's relaxed and flawless lead vocals are among the best in the salsa genre of Latin music. His early influences included the great Cuban vocalists Beny Moré and Miguelito Cuní. Santiago started his professional career singing with trios and playing guitar and bass. After stints with the bands of Chuíto Vélez, where he was called "The Puerto Rican Elvis Presley", Willie Rosario and Willie Rodriguez, his career reached new heights when he joined Ray Barretto's band. Between 1966 and 1972, Adalberto made eight studio albums with Ray Barretto, that contained hit songs like "Quitate La Mascara" and "Alma Con Alma". During this time period he also became an original founding member of the salsa "super-group" The Fania All-Stars. In late 1972, Adalberto and four other members of Barretto's band departed to found Típica 73. He appeared on three of their albums before disagreement over musical direction led him, and three other band members, to split during the mid-1970s to form Los Kimbos. Santiago sang lead vocals on charanga albums, Fantasía Africana/African Fantasy and Our Heritage - Nuestra Herencia, by flautist, composer and producer Lou Pérez.

Los Kimbos had a similar sound to both the pre-split Ray Barretto and Típica 73 outfits. With Los Kimbos, Adalberto recorded Los Kimbos (1976) and The Big Kimbos With Adalberto Santiago (1977). That year he also made his solo debut on Adalberto, which was produced by Barretto. Los Kimbos continued under the leadership of Orestes Vilató. Santiago sang lead on one track on Louie Ramírez y Sus Amigos by Louie Ramírez. In 1979, Adalberto and Ramírez co-produced his solo follow-up, Adalberto Featuring Popeye El Marino. The same year, he reunited with Barretto on Rican/Struction. Barretto produced Adalberto's next solo album, Feliz Me Siento (1980). Sonora Matancera member, Javier Vázquez, produced, arranged, directed and played piano on Adalberto Santiago, which was Adalberto's contribution to the early 1980s típico salsa revival. In 1982, Santiago joined with Roberto Roena for Super Apollo 47:50. Santiago then co-produced Calidad with Papo Lucca, who also played piano, and oversaw musical direction. His Cosas Del Alma was an album of boleros which included his third recorded version of "Alma Con Alma" (which was previously contained on Barretto's The Message and Gracias ), and featured arrangements made by Steve Sacks, Ray Santos and Alberto Naranjo, among others. He returned to Salsa Dura in 1985 on Más Sabroso.

Adalberto did his own version of salsa romántica on Sex Symbol, with production, arrangements, musical direction and piano by Isidro Infante. This album produced one of Santiago's biggest solo hit songs "La Noche Mas Linda Del Mundo". In 1990, he again performed "Alma Con Alma", this time arranged by Infante in a salsa romántica style for Louie Ramírez's second album entitled Louie Ramírez y Sus Amigos.

Santiago has written songs for a number of the albums on which he has appeared, both as lead singer and solo artist, and provided compositions for other artists to record, such as Joe Cuba. He has appeared in Robin Williams's movie Moscow on the Hudson, and provided music for Al Pacino's Carlito's Way as well as appearing as himself in the film Our Latin Thing and the Academy Award winning documentary Summer Of Soul.

Adalberto, now in his 80s, continues to record and perform in the US, Europe, and South America. In 2022 he recorded a Trap / Reggaeton style song "Quitate" with noted rappers Jon Z and Ñengo Flow. His discography is at over 100 and counting. He is celebrating more than 70 years as a professional musician. He resides in his native Puerto Rico and in New York City. His nephews Johnny Rivera and Tony Vega are also notable salsa singers.

== Discography ==
=== Solo ===
- Adalberto. Fania Records; 1977
- Adalberto Santiago Featuring Popeye El Marino. Fania Records JM 536; 1979
- Feliz Me Siento. Fania Records; 1980
- Adalberto Santiago. Fania Records; 1981
- Calidad. Fania Records; 1982
- Cosas del Alma. WS Latino 4163, 1984
- Más Sabroso. Budda Records 011; 1985
- Fania Dancing Club Collection #7. Fania Records; 1985
- Sex Symbol. Mayor Music 001; 1989
- Hay Algo En Ella. JV Music 001; 1991
- Romantico Y Salsero, Exitos. La Ola Musical; 2009
- Exitos. Edenways Records EDE 1310-1; 2010

=== With Chuito Velez ===
- Chuito Velez. Chuito Velez Y Sus Estrellas Boricuas. La Flor Records; 1958
- Chuito Velez. Hojas Muertas. DECCA Records; 1960
- Chuito Velez. Si Pancha Plancha. La Flor Records; 1962
- Chuito Velez. A Go-Go. SEECO Records; 1964

=== With Ray Barretto ===
- Ray Barretto. Latino Con Soul. UA Latino 6593, WS Latino 4053; 1967
- Ray Barretto. Acid. Fania Records LP 346; 1968
- Ray Barretto. Hard Hands. Fania Records LP 362; 1968
- Ray Barretto. Together. Fania Records LP 378; 1969
- Ray Barretto. Barretto Power. Fania Records LP 391; 1970
- Ray Barretto. The Message. Fania Records LP 403; 1971
- Ray Barretto. Qué Viva la Música. Fania Records LP 427; 1972

* Ray Barretto. Tomorrow: Barretto Live. Atlantic SD 2-509, Messidor 15950; 1976 *GRAMMY NOMINATION*

- Ray Barreto. Gracias. Fania Records JM 528; 1979
- Ray Barretto. Rican/Struction. Fania Records JM 552; 1979

* Ray Barretto, Celia Cruz, Adalberto Santiago. Tremendo Trío!. Fania Records JM 623; 1983 *GRAMMY NOMINATION*

- Ray Barretto. Fuerza Gigante (The Giant of Salsa): Live 50th Anniversary. AJ Records-Sony Discos; 2001

=== With Típica 73 ===
- Típica 73. Típica 73. Inca Records SLP 1031; 1973
- Típica 73. Típica 73 (Volume 2 with the "Stock Certificate Cover"). Inca Records SLP 1038; 1974
- Típica 73. La Candela. Inca Records SLP 1043; 1975
- Típica 73. Típica 73...74...75...76. Inca Records SLP 1063; 1978
- Típica 73. Típica 73 Live. AJ Records; 2002

=== With Los Kimbos ===
- Los Kimbos con Adalberto Santiago. Cotique CS 1083; 1976
- The Big Kimbos with Adalberto Santiago. Cotique CS 1091; 1977

=== With The Fania All Stars ===
- Fania All Stars. Live at the Red Garter, Vol. 1&2 (2-LPs). Fania Records LP 355 + LP 364; 1968
- Fania All Stars. Our Latin Thing. Fania Records LP 431; 1972
- Fania All Stars. Live At the Cheetah Vol. 1&2 (2-LPs). Fania Records LP 415 + LP 416; 1972
- Fania All Stars. Greatest Hits. Fania Records LP 511; 1977
- Fania All Stars. Habana Jam. Fania Records FA 116; 1979
- Fania All Stars. Commitment. Fania Records JM 564; 1980
- Fania All Stars. Latin Connection. Fania Records JM 595; 1981
- Fania All Stars. Lo Que Pide La Gente. Fania Records JM 629; 1984
- Fania All Stars. "Live" June 11, 1994, Puerto Rico. Fania Records JM 684; 1995
- Fania All Stars. Viva Colombia (En Concierto) (2-CD). Latina 225; 1996
- Fania All Stars. Bravo 97. Fania Records JM 711; Sony 82351; 1997
- Fania All Stars. Hot Sweat: The Best of FAS Live (2-CD). Vampi Soul Records 046; 2005
- Fania All Stars. Campeones (Anthology) (2-CD). Fania/Codigo Music; 2010
- Fania All Stars. Ponte Duro: The Fania All Stars Story (4-CD). Fania/Codigo Music; 2010

=== Contributions ===
- Willie Rosario. Boogaloo y Guaguanco. ATCO Records; 1968
- Willie Rodriguez. Colorin Colorao. Fonseca Records; 1968
- Willie Rodriguez. Heat Wave. Fonseca Records; 1969
- Larry Harlow. Hommy, A Latin Opera. Fania Records; 1973
- Impacto Crea. Christmas. VAYA Records; 1973
- Impacto Crea. Cobarde. VAYA Records; 1974
- Various Artists. Franklin Key Presenta Rumba Con Los Mejores. Inca Records; 1975
- Lou Perez. Fantasia Africana. WSL Records; 1975
- Lou Perez. Nuestra Herencia. TICO Records; 1976
- Pancho Cristal. Super Típica De Estrellas. All-Art Records; 1976
- Andy Harlow. Pura Salsa! Con Lo Mejor De Andy Harlow. Discos Completo, S.A.; 1977
- Louie Ramírez. Louie Ramírez Y Sus Amigos. Cotique Records 1096; 1978
- Linda Leida. Electricando Linda. TR Records; 1978

* Tito Puente. Homenaje A Beny More, Vol 1&2 (2 LP's). TICO Records; 1979 *GRAMMY WINNER*

- Mario Allison. A Fondo. FTA Records; 1979
- Louie Ramírez. Salsero. Cotique Records 1104; 1980
- Artistas de La Fania. Aeropuerto 81. Fania Records; 1980
- Roberto Roena y su Apollo Sound. Super Apollo 47:50. Fania Records LP 609; 1982
- Celia Cruz & Tito Puente. Homenaje A Beny More. VAYA Records; 1985
- Alfredo Rodriguez. Monsieur Oh La La. Caiman Records; 1985
- Alfredo Valdes Jr. Charanga Ranchera. The Mayor Records; 1989
- Isidro Infante. Salsa Sudada. Valdesa Records; 1990
- Various Artists. Bailoteca Vol: 12. FM Records; 1990
- Various Artists. Peligro Llego La Salsa. BMC; 1990
- Louie Ramirez. Louie Ramirez Y Sus Amigos. CaChe Records; 1990

* Linda Ronstadt. Frenesi. Elektra, Rhino; 1992 *GRAMMY WINNER*

- Candido Antomattei. Candido Y Las Super Estrellas. La Plata Records; 1994
- Orquesta Inmensidad. La Danza De Los Millones. Orlcon Records; 1995
- Various Artists. Latin Jazz. Intermusic S.A.; 1996
- David Rothschild. Lookin'Up!. Via Jazz Records; 1998
- Larry Harlow. Larry Harlow's Latin Legends Band 1998. Sony Music; 1998
- Various Artists. Coleccion Estelar De Salsa Dura. BCI Latino: 2000
- Various Artists. Salsa ! Demon Music Group; 2000
- Son 80s. Live At S.O.B.s. Exclusivo Records; 2001
- David Gonzalez with Larry Harlow. Sofrito. RainArt Productions; 2001
- Papo Lucca. Festival De Boleros. Flowmusic; 2002
- Jazz Hamilton. Jazz Hamilton Y Las Estrellas Del Pueblo. La Rosevelt Records; 2004
- Homenaje A Frankie Ruiz. Va Por Ti Frankie! Sony Music; 2004
- Johnny Pacheco. Entre Amigos. Bronco Records; 2005
- Ralph Irizarry & Soncafe. Tribute. BKS Records; 2006
- Various Artists. FANIA Soneros De Siempre Vol. 1. Universal Music; 2006
- Johnny Cruz. Back To The Classics. Tiffany Records; 2006
- Larry Harlow. Larry Harlow's Latin Legends Of Fania. Image Entertainment; 2007
- Mario Ortiz All-Star Band. Tributo A Mario Ortiz. Sony Music; 2009
- Luis Gonzalez. Tributo A Un Gigante. Tsunami Records; 2010
- Estrellas De La Salsa. 25 Aniversario Tropical Budda Records Vol. 1. West Side Beat; 2011
- Tribute To Ray Barretto. La Era Del Palladium. Sony Music; 2011
- Alfredo De La Fe & Rodry-Go. Sin Limites. No Borders Entertainment; 2013
- Edwin Clemente. Dos Generaciones En Salsa. Epacaje Records; 2015
- Orquesta Abran Paso. Back To The 70s. Abran Paso Records; 2015
- Orquesta Abran Paso. Salsa Radio-Activa. Abran Paso Records; 2019
- Johnny Cruz. Trayectoria De Clasicos. Cruz Music Inc.; 2019
- Orquesta Abran Paso. Clasicos En Vivo Vol. 1. Abran Paso Records; 2021

== See also ==
- List of Puerto Ricans
- Fania Records
