= El Trabuco Venezolano Vol. I =

Studio album by El Trabuco Venezolano

Studio album by El Trabuco Venezolano
- Released: 1977
- Recorded: 1977
- Genre: Jazz band, Latin American music
- Length: 39:28
- Label: Integra
- Producer: Orlando Montiel

El Trabuco Venezolano chronology
El Trabuco Venezolano Vol. I	El Trabuco Venezolano Vol. II

El Trabuco Venezolano - Vol. 1 is a vinyl LP by Venezuelan musician Alberto Naranjo, originally released in 1977 and partially reedited in two separate CD albums titled El Trabuco Venezolano 1977 - 1984 Vol. 1 and Vol. 2 released in 1995. It is the first of seven albums (two live albums) of the El Trabuco Venezolano musical project arranged and directed by Naranjo.

== Track listing ==
#	Song	Composer(s)	Vocal(s)	Solo(s)	Time
A1	Yo Soy La Rumba	Marcelino Guerra	C. D. Palacios	Lewis, Silva, Hernández	5:51
A2	El Tuerto	Alberto Naranjo	C. Rodríguez	R. Velázquez	4:26
A3	Uno	Mariano Mores; Enrique Santos Discépolo	J. Ruiz; C. D. Palacios	Silva	5:00
A4	Compadre Pedro Juan	Luis Alberti	C. Rodríguez	Arias (flugel)	4:24
B5	Bravo Rumbero	Grupo Mango	J. Ruiz		5:53
B6	El Patúo'	Trabuco	Instrumental	J. Velázquez	1:12
B7	Hasta Que Vuelvas	Felipe Gil; Mario Arturo	J. Ruiz	Silva	5:12
B8	El Hijo del Sonero	Ricardo Quintero	R. Quintero	Ortiz, C. Quintero, Lewis, Silva	7:30
				Total time	39:28

== Personnel ==
- Alberto Naranjo - drums, arranger, director on all tracks;
  timbales on 4 through 8, Dominican tambora on 4
- Eduardo Cabrera - piano on 1, 2, 4
- Lucio Caminiti - piano on 3, 7
- José Ortiz - piano on 5, 6, 8
- José Velásquez - bass guitar on all tracks
- Frank Hernández - timbales on 1, 2
- Carlos Quintero - congas on all tracks
- Jesús Quintero - bongos on all tracks
- Felipe Rengifo - percussion on 8
- Luis Arias - trumpet (lead) on all tracks
- Pablo Armitano - trumpet on all tracks except on 3 and 7
- José Díaz F. - flugel horn on 3, trumpet on 4
- Rafael Velázquez - trumpet on all tracks except on 3
- Luis Lewis Vargas - flugel horn on all tracks
- José Araujo - flugel horn on 3
- Rafael Silva - trombone (lead) on all tracks
- Rodrigo Barboza - trombone on all tracks
- Leopoldo Escalante - trombone on all tracks except on 3
- Carlos Espinoza - trombone on 3
- Carlos Daniel Palacios - lead singer on 1, 3 and chorus
- Joe Ruiz - lead singer on 3, 5, 7 and chorus
- Carlín Rodríguez - lead singer on 2, 4 and chorus
- Ricardo Quintero - lead singer on 8 and chorus

=== Technical personnel ===
- Artistic director: Domingo Alvarez
- Associate producer: César Miguel Rondón
- Executive producer: Orlando Montiel
- Musical director: Alberto Naranjo
- Design: Víctor Viano
- Photos: Fernando Sánchez
- Label: BASF Venezuela in association with YVLP con MusiC.A.
  BSF-LP Stereo 50.681 / YVLP-Stereo 10.084
- Print: Editorial El Arte
- Place of Recording: Estudios Sono Dos Mil
- Recording engineer: Ricardo Landaeta
- Mastering: Antonio González - Grabaciones Antor S. A.
- Produced in Caracas, Venezuela - 1977
