= El Curruchá =

Venezuelan folk song

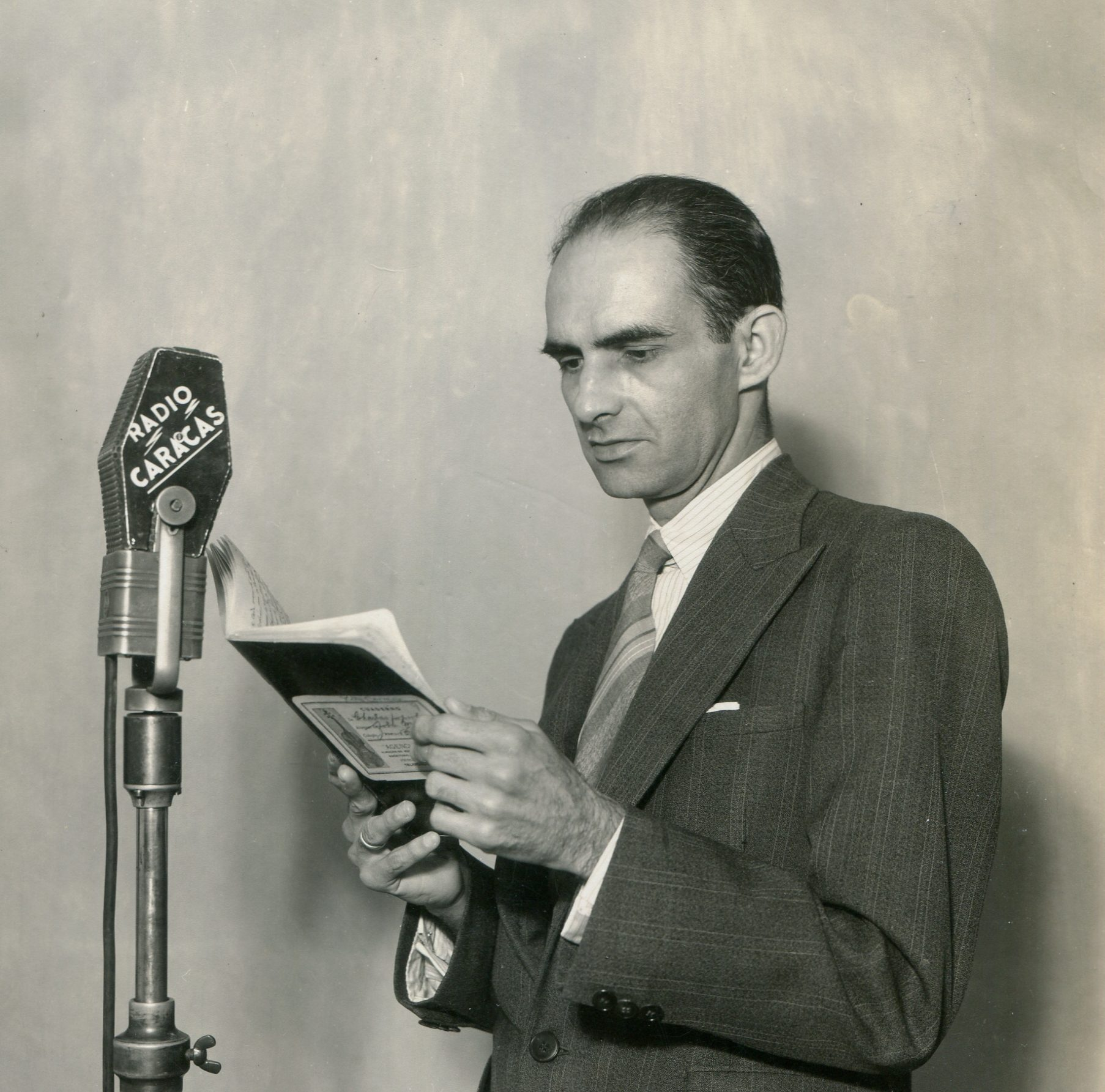
Juan Bautista Plaza, author of the song El curruchá

"El curruchá" is a well-known Venezuelan folk song in the joropo tradition, composed by Juan Bautista Plaza with lyrics by Vicente Emilio Sojo.

After its premiere in 1928 the piece became quite popular, in part because of its connection with joropo. It is lighter than much of Plaza's work; he never intended it to be viewed as art music, but as a popular piece, and later referred to it as "a little youthful sin."

It has been performed by singer Jesús Sevillano, the Quinteto Contrapunto vocal ensemble, and flutist Huáscar Barradas, among others.

== Lyrics ==
A mi negra la quiero, la quiero más que a la cotiza que llevo en el pie
A mi negra la quiero, la quiero más que a la tinaja cuando tengo sed
A mi negra la quiero, la quiero más que a mi chinchorro que me hace soñar
Más que al penco alazán que coleando en el pueblo mil veces me ha hecho ganar.

Cuando baila mi negra un joropo, el amor zapatea por dentro de mí
Al compás de puntera y talón, al compás de una quirpa sin fin
Con tal gracia menea la cadera ¡ay! mi negra que me hace perder la razón
Curruchá, con tal gracia menea la cadera ¡ay! mi negra que me hace perder la razón.

Si a mi negra la miro a los ojos se pone más roja que el paraguatán
Cuya flor es incendio en el bosque, corazón de abeja, licor de panal
Si me rozo con ella en el baile, me sube al cogollo un inmenso calor
Pues mi negra es trapiche en hornalla que enciende en cenizas mi leño de amor.

== See also ==
- Venezuela
- Venezuelan music
- Juan Bautista Plaza
