= Graciela Naranjo =

Venezuelan singer and actress

- Born: December 25, 1916; Maiquetía, Venezuela
- Died: April 11, 2001 (aged 84); Caracas, Venezuela
- Occupations: Singer and actress

Graciela Naranjo (December 25, 1916 – April 11, 2001) was a Venezuelan singer and actress. A radio, cinema and television pioneer in her homeland, she made her professional debut as a bolero singer in 1931. From the thirties onward her fame as a singer grew, she appeared in films and had her own TV show in an incredibly long career that extended from 1931 through 2000.

== Career ==
Graciela Naranjo was born in Maiquetía, Vargas. Orphaned at seven, she was moved to Caracas to be raised by her aunt. She started to sing Christmas music in a church choral group at age nine, then made her professional debut at Broadcasting Caracas when she was only 15. Largely self-taught, she had a warm contralto voice as her innovative behind-the-beat phrasing and emotional intensity that she put into the words she sang, served to turn novelty tunes and light songs into definitive, bolero-based treatments.

From the mid-1930s through the late 1940s, Naranjo shared stages with many prestigious visiting artists from around the world, including Ary Barroso, Carlos Gardel, Tito Guízar, Agustín Lara and Pedro Vargas, to become a notorious celebrity while her audience greatly increased. She also made films in Venezuela next to Amador Bendayán and Alfredo Sadel, among other important artists, appearing in Romance aragüeño (1939), Misión atómica (1947), and A La Habana me voy (1949). She also was backed up by the famed Orquesta Anacaona in a couple of songs that were recorded in Venezuela in 1943.

With the establishment of television in Venezuela in the early 1950s, Naranjo hosted her own TV show at the now-defunct Televisa from 1954 to 1955. At this time, she received contract offers from Colombia, Cuba, Mexico, and Puerto Rico, but chose to stick around Caracas and raised a family instead of pursuing an international artistic career. She put off potential success until finally becoming a major TV attraction while in her 40s, retiring in 1961 in the Renny Ottolina TV show. After that, she performed on a periodic basis on radio, universities and nostalgia shows until the early 1980s.

== Personal life ==
Graciela Naranjo is the mother of Venezuelan musician Alberto Naranjo. She was survived by her son Alberto Naranjo and her daughter Angela Mercedes Pratt; her grandchildren Grecia Garrett, Jorge Naranjo and Luis Naranjo, and great granddaughter Kai Naranjo.

== Discography ==
Graciela Naranjo, in 1999.

As soloist

- Los Cantos del Corazón (1995)
- El Legado (1998)

As guest

- Cosas del Alma - Delia (1993)
- Tu bolero soy yo - Various interpreters (1998)
- Dulce y Picante - Alberto Naranjo (1998)
- Cada piano con su tema - Ignacio Izcaray (2000)

== See also ==
- List of famous or notable Venezuelans
