= Conexión Latina =

Conexión Latina is a salsa music and Afro-Cuban jazz orchestra based in Germany, which was founded in 1980 by trombonist Rudi Fuesers. From the beginning, the orchestra was formed of musicians from different Latin American countries like Colombia, Cuba, Jamaica, Peru, Puerto Rico, Jamaica and Venezuela, creating an original mixture that gave the band its unique sound and made it Europe's leading salsa orchestra. Among the musicians that have played for Conexion Latina are Benny Bailey, Dusko Goykovich, Larry Harlow, Nicky Marrero, Bobby Shew and Bobby Stern, between others. The quality of Conexion Latina's music is also due to first-class arrangements made by Oscar Hernández, Alberto Naranjo and Marty Sheller, to name just a few. The band also has been invited to selected festivals around Europe, sharing stages with artists such as Tito Puente, Mongo Santamaría, Rubén Blades, Irakere, Willie Colón and Eddie Palmieri.

== Discography ==
- 1984: Calorcito (Enja)
- 1986: Un Poco Loco (Enja)
- 1992: Mambo 2000 (Enja)
- 1996: La Conexión (Enja)
- 2001: Mambo Nights (Enja)
