= Hasta Siempre, Comandante =

1965 song by Carlos Puebla

"Hasta siempre, comandante"

Song by Carlos Puebla
- Songwriter: Carlos Puebla

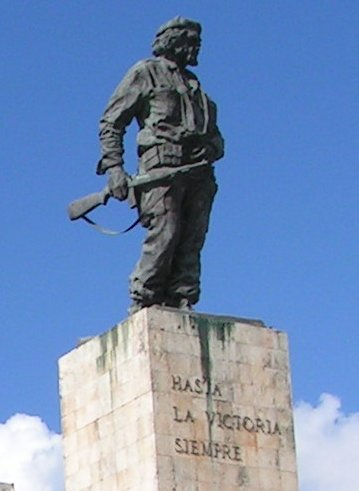
The Che Guevara monument in Santa Clara, Cuba (detail)

"Hasta Siempre, Comandante," ("Until Forever, Commander" in English) or simply "Hasta Siempre", is a 1965 song by Cuban composer Carlos Puebla. The song's lyrics are a reply to revolutionary Che Guevara's farewell letter when he left Cuba, in order to foster revolution in the Congo and later Bolivia, where he was captured and killed.

The lyrics recount key moments of the Cuban Revolution, describing Che Guevara and his role as a revolutionary commander. The song became iconic after Guevara's death, and many left-leaning artists did their own cover versions of the song afterwards. The title is a part of Guevara's well known saying "¡Hasta la victoria siempre!" ("Until victory, always!").

The song has been covered numerous times.

== Metrical structure ==
Like many of the songs of the author and in line with the tradition of the Cuban and Caribbean music, the song consists of a refrain plus a series of five verses (quatrain), rhyming ABBA, with each line written in octosyllabic verse.

3rd stanza
[1] (1)Vie-(2)nes (3)que-(4)man-(5)do (6)la (7)bri-(8)sa
[2] (1)con (2)so-(3)les (4)de (5)pri-(6)ma-(7)ve-(8)ra
[3] (1)pa-(2)ra (3)plan-(4)tar (5)la (6)ban-(7)de-(8)ra
[4] (1)con (2)la (3)luz (4)de (5)tu (6)son-(7)ri-(8)sa

== Lyrics ==
Original lyrics in Spanish

Translated English lyrics

Aprendimos a quererte
desde la histórica altura
donde el Sol de tu bravura
le puso cerco a la muerte.

We learned to love you
from the historical heights
where the sun of your bravery
laid siege to death

Chorus:
Aquí se queda la clara,
la entrañable transparencia,
de tu querida presencia,
Comandante Che Guevara.

Chorus:
Here lies the clear,
dear transparency
of your beloved presence,
Commander Che Guevara

Tu mano gloriosa y fuerte
sobre la Historia dispara
cuando todo Santa Clara
se despierta para verte.

Your glorious and strong hand
over History it shoots
when all of Santa Clara
awakens to see you (Your glorious efforts throughout history resound like gunfire awakening Santa Clara.)

[Chorus]

[Chorus]

Vienes quemando la brisa
con soles de primavera
para plantar la bandera
con la luz de tu sonrisa.

You come burning the breeze
with springtime suns
to plant the flag
with the light of your smile

[Chorus]

[Chorus]

Tu amor revolucionario
te conduce a nueva empresa
donde esperan la firmeza
de tu brazo libertario.

Your revolutionary love
leads you to new undertaking
where they are waiting for the firmness
of your liberating arm

[Chorus]

[Chorus]

Seguiremos adelante,
como junto a ti seguimos,
y con Fidel te decimos :
«¡Hasta siempre, Comandante!»

We will carry on
as we followed you then
and with Fidel we say to you:
"Until forever, Commander!"

== Versions ==
There are more than 200 versions of this song. The song has also been covered by Compay Segundo, Soledad Bravo, Óscar Chávez, Nathalie Cardone, Robert Wyatt, Milva Nomadi, Inés Rivero, Silvio Rodríguez, Ángel Parra, Celso Piña, Ferhat Mehenni, Veronica Rapella (whose performance is attributed to Joan Baez by a common mistake), Rolando Alarcón, Los Olimareños, Maria Farantouri, Jan Garbarek, Wolf Biermann, Boikot, Los Calchakis (commonly wrongly attributed to Buena Vista Social Club), George Dalaras, Apurimac, Giovanni Mirabassi and Al Di Meola, Ahmet Koç, Mohsen Namjoo, Enrique Bunbury, Verasy, Interitus Dei among others. Although Víctor Jara never sang this song, many attribute the Carlos Puebla version to him by mistake.

=== Nathalie Cardone version ===
"Hasta Siempre"

Single by Nathalie Cardone
- Released: 7 July 1997
- Recorded: 1997
- Length: 4:12
- Label: Columbia / Sony
- Songwriter: Carlos Puebla
- Producer: Laurent Boutonnat

Music video
- "Hasta Siempre" on YouTube

The most commercially successful version of the song was that made by singer Nathalie Cardone and produced by Laurent Boutonnat. Released as "Hasta Siempre", it reached number 2 on the French Singles chart and the top of the Belgian francophone Wallonia charts. The song stayed 38 weeks on the French charts. A music video was also released.

Tracklists

- Single-CD
1. "Hasta siempre" - 4:12
2. "Hasta siempre (Guitar Mix)" - 4:17
- Single-Maxi
1. "Hasta siempre" - 4:18
2. "Hasta siempre (Steve Baltes Extended Club Mix)" - 5:30
3. "Hasta siempre (Steve Baltes Remix)" - 6:12
4. "Hasta siempre (Steve Baltes On Air Mix)" - 3:45
5. "Hasta siempre (Guitar Mix)" - 4:17

Charts

Chart (1997–1998)	Peak position
Belgium (Ultratop 50 Wallonia)	1
France (SNEP)	2
Netherlands (Single Top 100)	99

=== Inés Rivero version ===
"Che Guevara (Hasta Siempre)"

Single by Inés Rivero
- Released: 1997
- Recorded: 1997
- Length: 3:20
- Label: EMI
- Songwriter: Carlos Puebla

Simultaneously with Nathalie Cardone, Argentine model Inés Rivero released her own version under the title "Che Guevara (Hasta Siempre)". Released on the EMI label and reached number 18 on the French Singles chart. It spent 15 weeks on the French charts. This version was included in the compilation album Hit Express 4 in 1998.

Charts

Chart (1997–1998)	Peak position
France (SNEP)	18

== In popular culture ==
The first 8 lines of the song have been rendered as prologue to a melody song in the Malayalam socio-political movie Left Right Left.

== See also ==
- List of socialist songs
