= Nathalie Cardone =

French actress and singer

- Born: 29 March 1967 (age 59); Pau, France
- Genres: Pop
- Occupations: Singer, actress
- Years active: 1988–present

Nathalie Cardone (born 29 March 1967) is a French actress and singer.

== Biography ==
Cardone was born in Pau, in South-West France. Her father was Sicilian and her mother Spanish. She appeared for the first time on French screens in 1988 in the film Drôle d'endroit pour une rencontre beside Gérard Depardieu and Catherine Deneuve. This first outing gained her a nomination for the César Award for Most Promising Actress in 1989.

== Career ==
Cardone's career launched after a small role in La Petite Voleuse. She found success as a singer with Laurent Boutonnat, famous for his work with Mylene Farmer. She produced several hit singles including "Populaire", "Mon Ange," and — most famously — "Hasta Siempre", a song which honours the Argentinian revolutionary Che Guevara. Her first record sold over 750,000 copies in France.

== Personal life ==
She was the partner of Axel Bauer, with whom she has a son, Jim, born on June 21, 1991. Jim finished second in season 10 of TF1's The Voice in 2021.

== Discography ==
=== Albums ===
- 1999: Nathalie Cardone (# 30 France - Platinum, # 26 Belgium)
- 2008: Servir le beau

=== Singles ===
Year	Title	Peak positions			Album
Year	Title	France	Belgium	Netherlands	Album
1997	Hasta siempre	2	1	99	Nathalie Cardone
1998	Populaire	88	—	—	Nathalie Cardone
1999	...Mon ange	8	2	—	Nathalie Cardone
1999	Baila si	—	—	—	Nathalie Cardone
1999	Les hommes de ma vie (promo)	—	—	—	Nathalie Cardone
2008	Yo soy rebelde / Hasta siempre	24	—	—	Servir le beau
2008	Ma sœur (sera jamais ma rivale)	57	—	—	Servir le beau
2009	Le temps des fleurs	44	—	—	Servir le beau
2009	Si se calla el cantor	43	—	—	Servir le beau
