= Carlos Puebla =

Cuban musician (1917–1989)

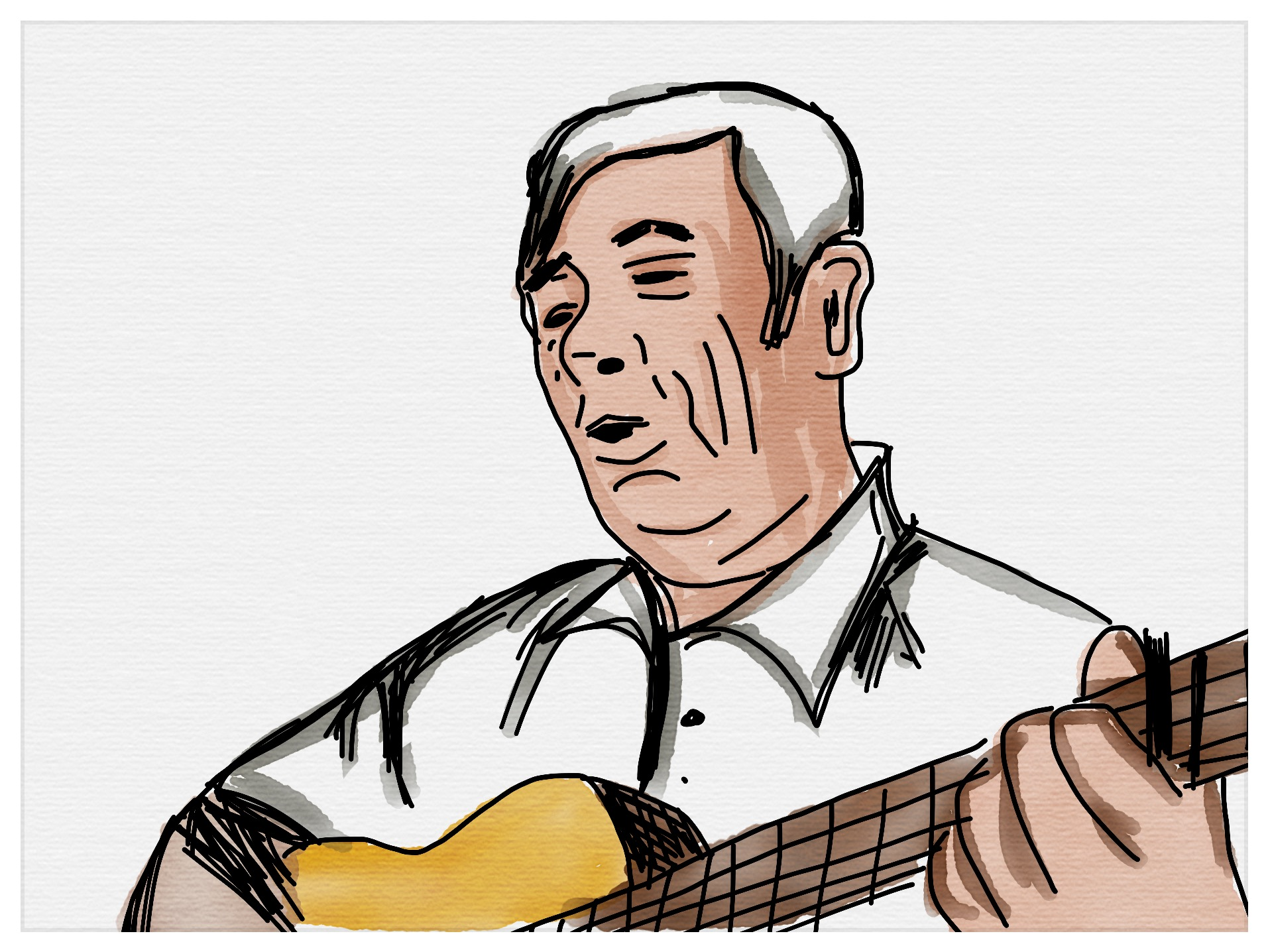

Background information
- Birth name: Carlos Manuel Puebla
- Born: 11 September 1917; Manzanillo, Cuba
- Died: 12 July 1989 (aged 71); Havana, Cuba
- Occupation(s): Singer, guitarist, composer

Carlos Manuel Puebla (Spanish pronunciation: [ˈkaɾlos ˈpweβla]; 11 September 1917 – 12 July 1989) was a Cuban singer, guitarist and composer. He was a member of the Trova movement, who specialized in boleros and patriotic songs.

== Biography ==
Born into a modest family, he did several types of manual jobs during his youth (carpenter, mechanic, sugarcane worker, shoemaker), but quickly became interested in music, and especially in the guitar. He learned how to play the instrument by himself, but he did study harmony and theory of music.

He began composing during the 1930s, and met with a certain amount of popularity in his native city. He recorded with his group Los Tradicionales, formed in 1953. From 1962 he was a regular performer in La Bodeguita del medio, a bar-restaurant in Old Havana which was a favourite haunt of Cuban and foreign intellectuals.

Politically he stood beside Fidel Castro before the 1959 Revolution. In 1961, he went on tour in several countries with his musicians. His music, as well as his political activity, turned his concerts into a success. He was thenceforth called "El Cantor de la Revolución" (the singer of the revolution) and other world tours followed. A song of that clearly reflects this notion is the song titled, Para nosotros siempre es 26; A song that refers to the Moncada assault against the Batista government that ultimately failed and became the symbol of the revolution. More than an ambassador for Cuban music, he was an ambassador for Cuba.

In 1965, the night after Fidel Castro's speech announcing Che Guevara's departure from the government, Puebla, seized by passion, composed what would become his most celebrated work, Hasta Siempre, Comandante, a true declaration of love for and hope in Che Guevara.

On 12 July 1989, he died in Havana after a long illness. His ashes were transferred to the cemetery of his native city five years later. A plaque there reads: "yo soy ésto que soy, un simple trovador que canta" ("I am what I am, a simple troubadour who sings").

== Works ==
Puebla began by writing love songs, such as Quiero hablar contigo (I want to talk with you), Este amor de nosotros (This love of ours), Serenata cubana, Canción definitiva, Qué sé yo and Te vieron con él, which later became successes, and also Cuenta conmigo, Quién se lo iba a imaginar and Hay que decir adiós, popularised by the duo Clara and Mario.

From the beginning of the 1950s, he sang of the difficult living conditions of his people and challenged Batista's dictatorship with such songs as Plan de machete, Este es mi pueblo and Pobre de mi Cuba. His lyrics were serious and direct. Specifically, the Moncada assault of 1953 against the Batista Government impacted him and inspired Puebla to immortalize the date with the song, Para nosotros siempre es 26.

Along with his serious and impactful music, his poems also held power. With the use of humor and irony, a collection of his poems criticizing the inefficiencies of the society and economy reflect what the common Cuban citizen felt during the revolutionary time period. His poems: Cine en Televisión, Cosa Ocurrida, La Espera and Otra nueva ilusión embody the thoughts and common sentiment of the Cuban community and give an understanding as to what they desired, change. In Cine en Televisión, Puebla explains how the same old films are shown on this television show and that it is redundant and boring, craving something new and entertaining. Cosa Ocurrida, tells the funny story of a newspaper boy who always arrives late with the publication, but one day he arrived early which made everyone celebrate however, it turns out it was with the newspaper of the day before. An analogy for the arrival of items they need due being late to the strict regulations. The last two mentioned, La Espera and Otra nueva ilusión, fit together in the idea of waiting for change and obtaining hope with the rise of new ideologies. This is conveyed with the metaphor of love and being in love with someone and waiting for said person to reciprocate.

The 1959 Revolution inspired him to write new songs, such as Y en eso llegó Fidel (And then Fidel came in), Fidel y La OEA (Fidel and the Organization of American States) Procura venir el paz (~Try to get peace), Yankees go home!, La Reforma Agraria (Agrarian reform), Duro con él, Ya ganamos la pelea (Tough on him, we already won the fight.) and Son de la alfabetización.

His most famous song, Hasta Siempre, Comandante, has been covered by dozens of artists from all over the world, notably in France, by Nathalie Cardone and Los Calchakis, although this last one is wrongly attributed to Buena Vista Social Club.
