= Alba Quintanilla =

Venezuelan musician, composer, conductor, and pedagogue (born 1944)

- Born: July 11, 1944 (age 81); Mérida, Mérida, Venezuela
- Occupation(s): Composer, instrumentalist, conductor
- Instrument(s): Harp, harpsichord, piano

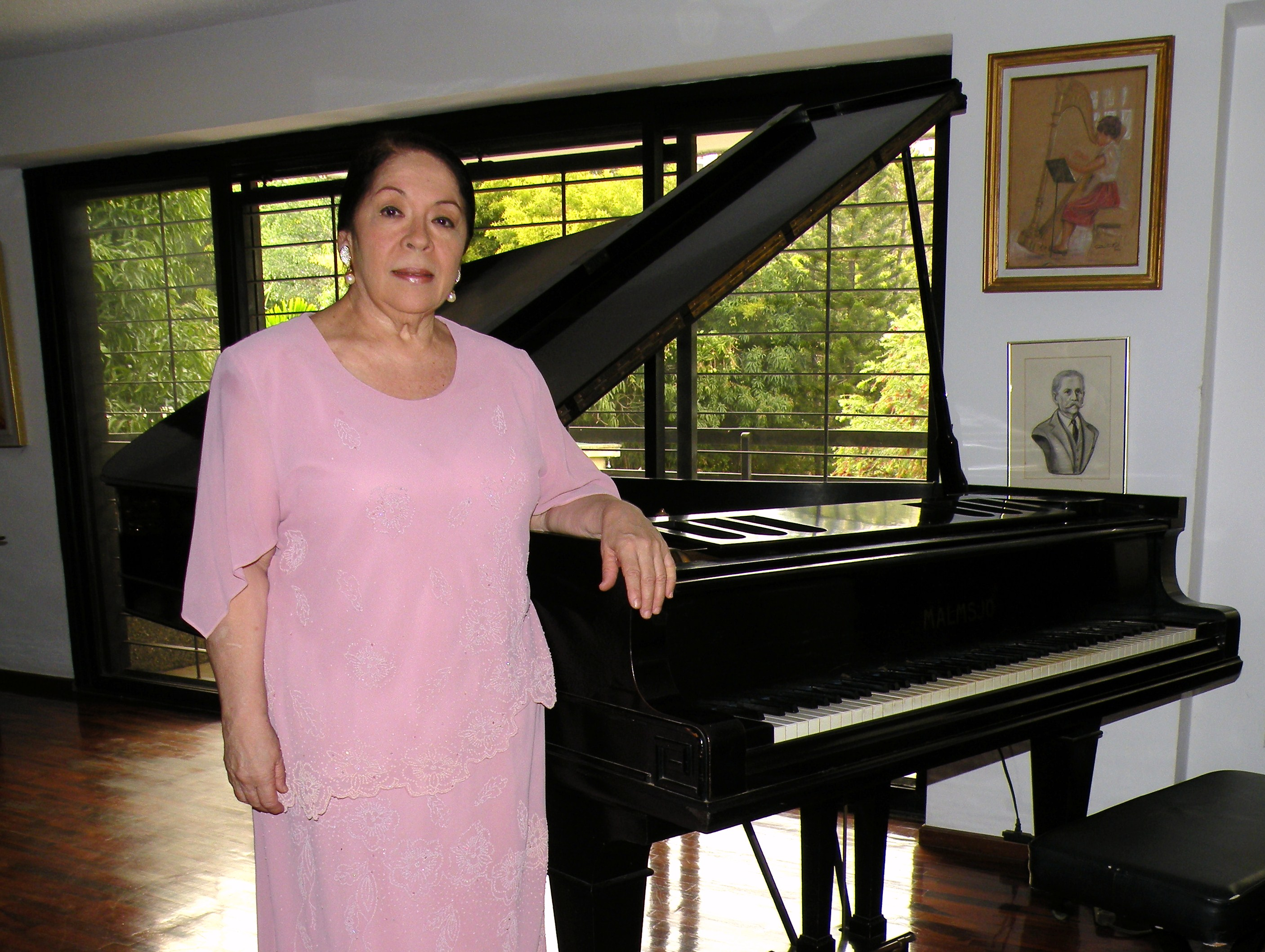
Alba Quintanilla besides her piano. April 2015.

Alba Quintanilla (born July 11, 1944) is a Venezuelan composer, harpist, harpsichordist, pianist, singer, conductor, and pedagogue.

== Biography ==
Quintanilla was born in Mérida, Mérida, and had her first contact with music through her parents, especially her father, Venezuelan painter, sculpturist, and pedagogue Luis Felipe Quintanilla Ponce. At age 10 she matriculated at the Escuela Superior de Música José Ángel Lamas, where she studied piano, harp, harpsichord, singing (soprano), composition, and conduction; her instructors there included Vicente Emilio Sojo, Raimundo Pereira, Juan Bautista Plaza, Gonzalo Castellanos Yumar, Evencio Castellanos, Cecilia de Majo, Evelia Taborda, Lidya Venturini, and Pablo Manelski. She continued her music studies at the Conservatory in Warsaw, Poland, during one of her sabbatical years (1970). There, she studied with conductor Ryszard Dudek and composer Witold Rudzinski. From 1982 through 1984 Quintanilla attended the Staatliche Hochschule für Musik und Darstellende Kunst Mannheim in Mannheim, Germany, continuing her postgraduate studies in composition with Prof. Helmut Weindland.

Quintanilla was the first woman to conduct the Venezuela Symphony Orchestra on November 18, 1967, premiering her Tres Canciones para Mezzosoprano y Orquesta (Three songs for mezzo-soprano and symphonic orchestra), which was awarded the National Music Prize that year. She had previously conducted the choir and orchestra of the Asociación Wolfgang Amadeus Mozart.

She has been active as a pedagogue throughout Venezuela, teaching music theory, harmony, counterpoint, harp, and piano in various conservatories and music schools until her retirement in 1990. From 1985 until 1990, she was the director of the Escuela Nacional de Música Juan Manuel Olivares in Caracas; she has also served as director at the Music Conservatory in Maracay Maracay (1980).

As a composer, she has produced several cantatas and other vocal works. She has also written chamber music and soloist works, especially for the piano, harp, and trumpet. Her music has won over a dozen awards and prizes throughout her career, and she has also been honored with several Orders and Decorations.
