= Soledad Bravo =

Venezuelan singer (born 1943)

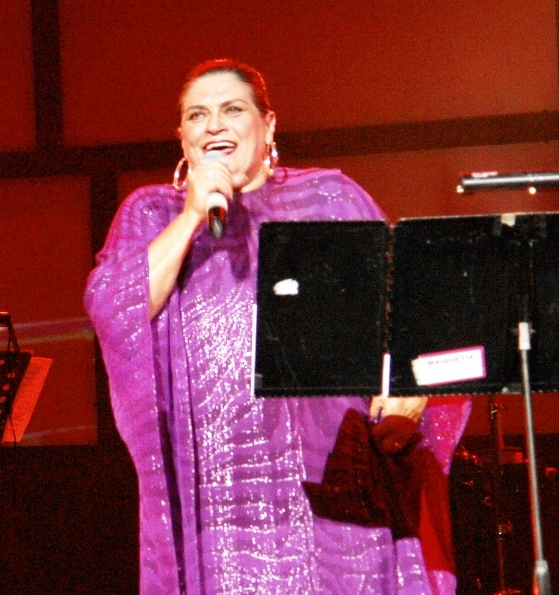

Background information
- Born: January 1, 1943 (age 83)
- Origin: Logroño, La Rioja, Spain
- Genres: Traditional, Political
- Occupations: Singer; Musician; Composer
- Instruments: Vocals; Guitar; Acoustic guitar
- Years active: 1968–present

Soledad Bravo (born January 1, 1943) is a Venezuelan singer.

Born in Logroño, La Rioja, Spain, her father was a Spanish republican, moving to Venezuela with his family when his daughter was still at an early age. At 24, Soledad began studying architecture and philosophy at the Universidad Central de Venezuela, where she also began performing. One year later, in 1968, she released her debut titled Soledad Bravo Canta (Soledad Bravo Sings), which made her a star in Venezuela and other parts of South America. In the years that followed, she cooperated with Atahualpa Yupanqui, Gilberto Gil and others, having lived and performed in Europe and the Americas. Her repertoire is a vivid mixture of fiery, vivid Caribbean and Latin rhythms, Sephardic elegies and heartwarming ballads.

Considered to be one of the best voices in Latin America, one of her most popular and best known songs is Hasta Siempre, a cover of a Cuban hymn by Carlos Puebla to Ernesto "Che" Guevara.

== Discography ==
- Soledad Bravo Canta (1968)
- Soledad (1969)
- Soledad Bravo, Vol. 3 (1970)
- Soledad Bravo, Vol. 4 (1973)
- Cantos De La Nueva Trova Cubana (1974)
- Canto La Poesia De Mis Companeros (1975)
- Rafael Alberti (1977)
- Flor Del Cacao (1979)
- Cantos Sefardíes (1980)
- Caribe (1982)
- Mambembe (1983)
- Con Amor...Boleros (1992)
- Volando Voy (1993)
- Arrastrando La Cobija (1994)
- En Vivo (1994)
- Songs of Venezuela (1995)
- Raíces (1995)
- Cuando Hay Amor (1996)
- Cantos Revolucionarios De América Latina (1997)
- Paloma Negra (2001)
- Homenaje à Alfredo Zitarrosa (2002)
