= María Rivas (singer) =

Venezuelan Latin jazz singer (1960–2019)

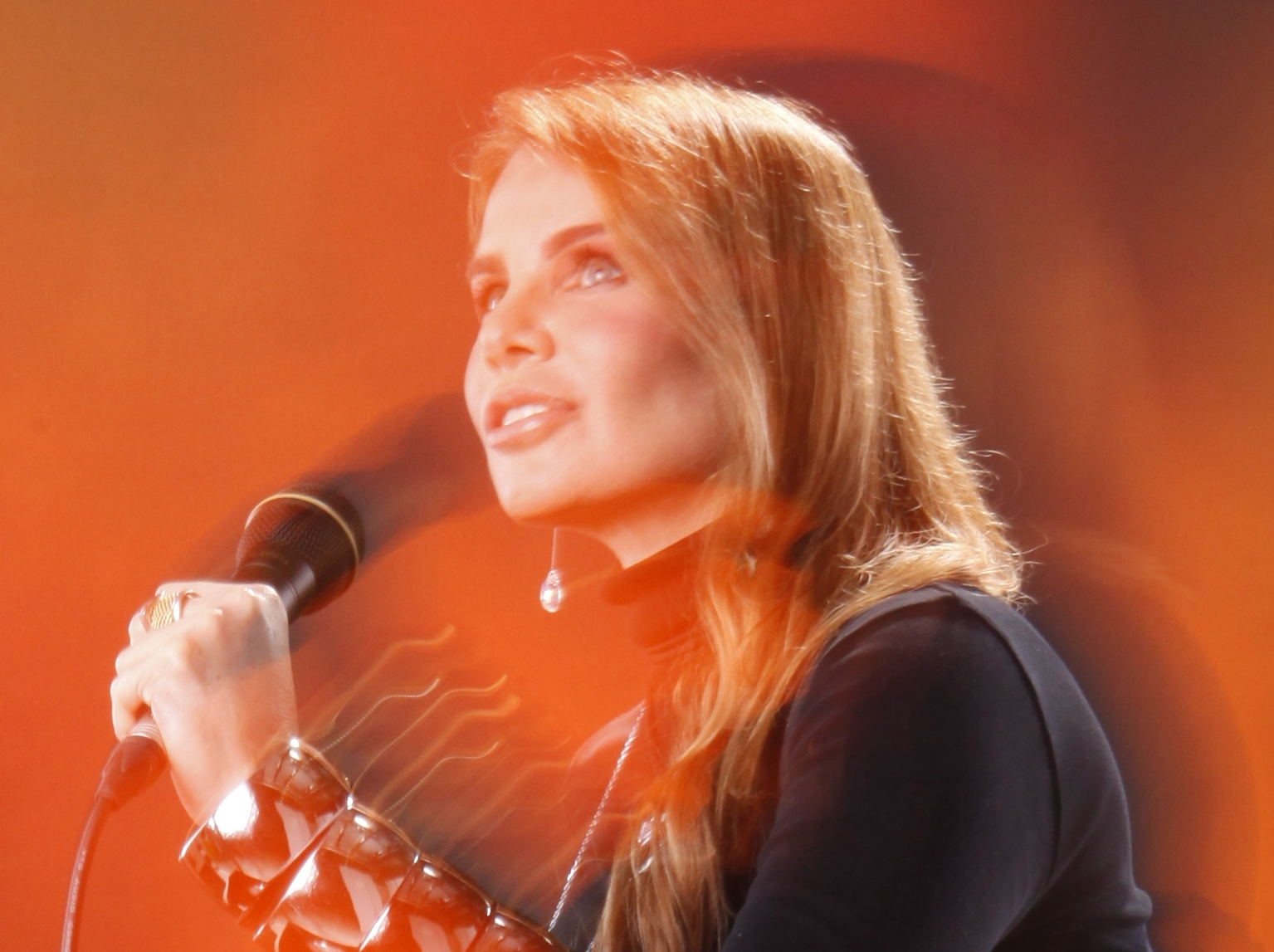
- Rivas in 2010

Background information
- Born: January 26, 1960; Caracas, Venezuela
- Died: September 19, 2019 (aged 59) Miami, Florida
- Genres: Latin jazz
- Occupations: Singer, composer
- Years active: 1983–2019
- Website: www.mariarivasjazz.com

María Rivas (January 26, 1960 – September 19, 2019) was a Venezuelan Latin jazz singer, composer, and painter.

== Career ==
Born in Caracas, Venezuela of a Spanish mother and Venezuelan father, Rivas gradually built her voice skills as a hobby, absorbing the multiple influences of contemporary Venezuelan and Latin musicians. She then began singing professionally in local night clubs starting in 1983, but soon moved to Aruba where, for 2½ years, she performed in a nightly jazz show named Sentimental Journey Through Jazz, much of its material; in the style of Ella Fitzgerald and other notable divas.

Rivas became a leading voice in the region's environmental movement, and her musical message as a composer often had ecological undertones.

In 2005 Rivas returned to Aruba to be part of the show "God Save The Queen", a tribute to the rock band Queen. Since 2006 Rivas spent 4 months each year in Tokyo, where she found acclaim for her performances of Brazilian and Latin Jazz, along with Classic American Jazz, sharing the summertime stage with the Indigo Trio, a local jazz ensemble in Roppongi, Japan.

Rivas recorded eleven albums as a soloist. Her latest CD, MOTIVOS, was released in 2018 and nominated for a Latin Grammy for the 19th Annual Latin Grammy Awards. She performed live in Colombia, Brazil, Austria, the Netherlands, Italy, Switzerland, France, Germany, Portugal, Panama, Puerto Rico, Spain, Great Britain, the Dominican Republic, and the United States.

In 2008 Rivas celebrated her 25th anniversary since starting her long career, with special homage concerts dedicated to the much-beloved Maestro Aldemaro Romero, who died in 2007 at 79 years of age, featuring Romero's music and arrangements. In 2012–2013 Rivas celebrated her 30th anniversary as a vocalist, composer and recording artist, with special concerts performed throughout Venezuela and the United States.

== Discography ==
- Primogénito (first Compact Disc made in Venezuela, 1990)
- Manduco (1992)
- Mapalé (1994)
- Muaré (1996)
- Café Negrito (1999)
- En Concierto: Maria Rivas y Aldemaro Romero (2003),
- Aquador (Soloist and composer, 2005)
- María Rivas: 18 Grandes Éxitos (2006)
- Pepiada Queen (2007)
- Live Lunch Break (Recorded Live, 2010)
- Motivos (2018)
