= Billo Frómeta =

Dominican orchestra conductor, arranger and composer

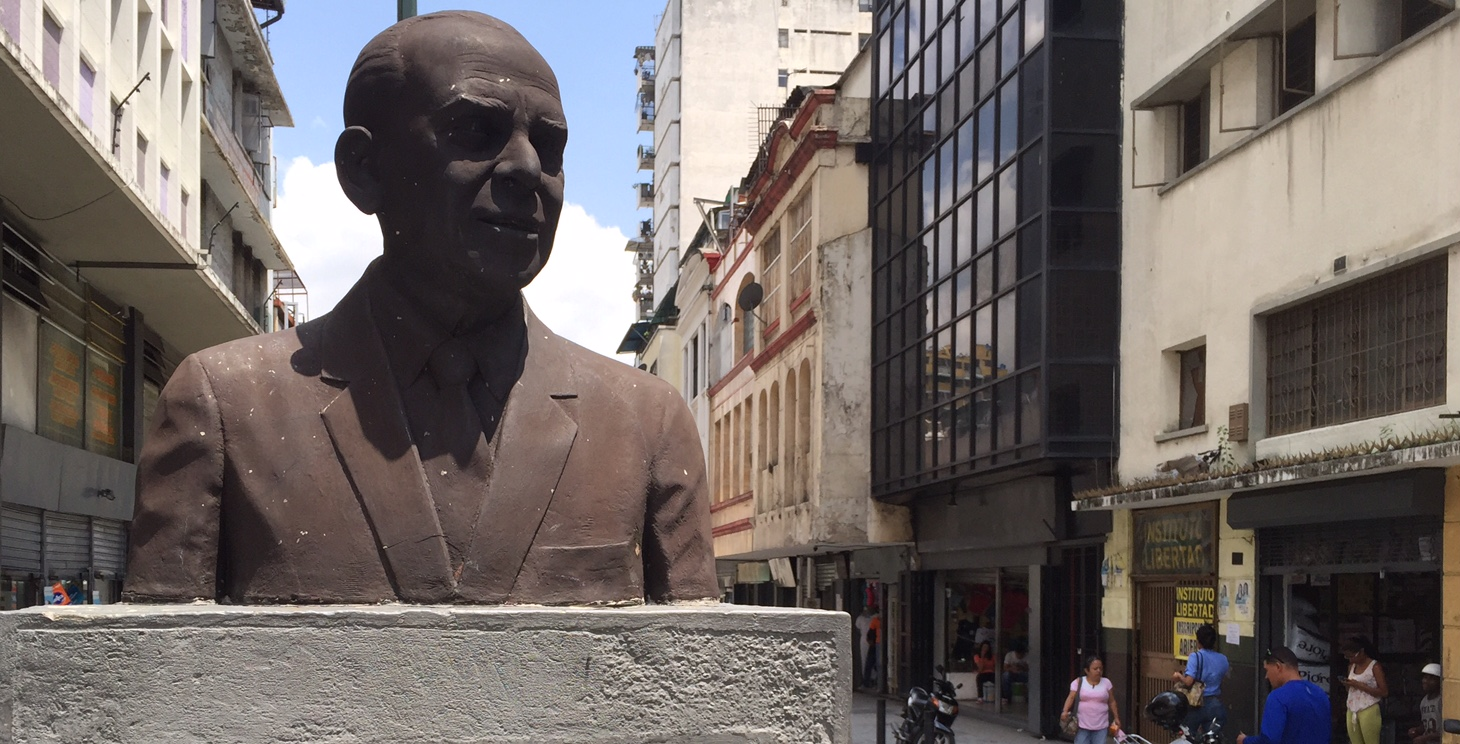
- Bust of Billo Frómeta in downtown Caracas
- Born: Luis María Frómeta Pereyra; 15 November 1915; Santo Domingo, Dominican Republic
- Died: 5 May 1988 (aged 72); Caracas, Venezuela

Luis María Frómeta Pereyra most known as Billo Frómeta (15 November 1915 – 5 May 1988) was a Dominican-Venezuelan orchestra conductor, arranger and composer. Billo's compositions achieve international fame, and those dedicated to Caracas, where he married several times and raised a family, made him the most beloved of composers. He always included Dominican Merengue and mangulinas in his recordings.

He was considered the most animated interpreter of Colombian cumbia, for which he was honored.

== Early career ==
Luis María Frómeta Pereira was born in Pimentel, Duarte Province, Dominican Republic, on 15 November 1915. He would move with his family to San Francisco de Macorís some years later. The school he attended there had compulsory music lessons, so he learned much of his musical training there.

In 1930, at the age of 15, he founded and was the resident conductor of the Banda del Cuerpo de Bomberos de Ciudad Trujillo (Ciudad Trujillo's Fire Brigade's Band). He also founded the Orquesta Sinfónica de Santo Domingo during this time.

In 1933, he moved back to Santo Domingo. During these years, he would meet and work with some of his closest friends and associates: Freddy Coronado, Ernesto Chapuseaux and Simó Damirón, whom he already knew from school. The Conjunto Tropical and the Santo Domingo Jazz Band were formed then, as well.

Frómeta then began studying Pre-Medicine in the Universidad de Santo Domingo and had to abandon all musical activity during this time. However, he eventually dropped out on his third year to dedicate himself fully to music.

== Career in Venezuela ==
Frómeta arrived in Venezuela in December 1937 with his orchestra to play regularly at the Roof Garden, a dance club in Caracas. As the Santo Domingo Jazz Band, they did well but the club owners did not like the name, so they convinced Frómeta to change it to something more marketable. Frómeta agreed but he was barred from ever returning to his native Dominican Republic as Trujillo considered the change to Billo's Caracas Boys an insult. Billo, Grandes Éxitos, a compilation album of the most famous songs of the Billo's Caracas Boys, was released in 1996.

Frómeta continued to play in Venezuela until the fall of Marcos Pérez Jiménez in 1958. Accused of being a supporter of the regime, he was barred by the Asociación Musical del D.F y Estado Miranda from ever playing in Venezuela again.

Following this, he moved to Cuba to play with a Cuban band there. In 1960, a special session of the National Assembly was convened in Caracas. The purpose was to lift the ban passed on Billo in 1958, which was by then considered to have been unfair. That very same year, Frómeta returned to Venezuela.

== Last years ==
On 27 April 1988 he suffered a stroke while rehearsing with the Venezuela Symphony Orchestra for a concert-tribute in his honour that would occur the very next day: just after he finished conducting the practice run for "Un Cubano en Caracas", he collapsed on the ground as the orchestra was applauding his performance. Frómeta died in Caracas the following week, on 5 May 1988.

== See also ==
- Venezuelan music
