= Luis Alfonzo Larrain =

Background information
- Also known as: Magician of the dancing Music
- Born: July 22, 1911; La Victoria, Aragua state, Venezuela
- Died: July 4, 1996 (aged 84) Caracas, Venezuela
- Genres: Venezuelan popular music, Caribbean music
- Occupations: musician, composer, director, producer

Luis Alfonzo Larrain (22 July 1911 – 4 July 1996), was a Venezuelan composer, music director and producer, sometimes known as the Magician of the dancing Music.

Luis Alfonzo Larrain died on 4 July 1996, in Caracas.

Some of his works: “Quisiera”, “Vente pa’ca”, “Amandanos”, “Dulce y Picante”, “El Morrocoy”, “El pon pon”, “Se que me Quieres”, “Rosendo”, “Oye mi Cancion”, “La Pelota”.

== See also ==
- Music of Venezuela
