= Cecilia Todd =

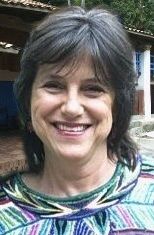

Background information
- Born: March 4, 1951 (age 75); Caracas, Venezuela
- Genres: Venezuelan traditional music
- Occupation: Singer
- Instrument: Cuatro
- Years active: 1972–present

Cecilia Todd Vallenilla (born March 4, 1951, in Caracas, Venezuela) is a venezuelan singer and musician.

== See also ==
- Venezuelan music
