= Irakere & Trabuco – En Vivo, Poliedro de Caracas, Mayo 15 '81 =

Live album by Grupo Irakere and El Trabuco Venezolano
- Released: 1982
- Recorded: May 15, 1981
- Genres: Jazz band Latin American music Live album
- Length: 36:11
- Label: Integra
- Producers: Alberto Naranjo; Orlando Montiel

Grupo Irakere and El Trabuco Venezolano chronology
Irakere & Trabuco – En Vivo, Poliedro de Caracas, Mayo 14 '81	Irakere & Trabuco – En Vivo, Poliedro de Caracas, Mayo 15 '81

Irakere & Trabuco – En Vivo, Poliedro de Caracas, Mayo 15 '81 is a vinyl-LP live album released in 1982.

The Cuban band Irakere of Chucho Valdés and El Trabuco Venezolano led by Alberto Naranjo shared a stage three times – twice in Venezuela at the Poliedro de Caracas, in 1979 and 1981 (two concerts each year), and once at the Teatro Carlos Marx in Havana, Cuba in 1981. This recording shows the second of the two face-to-face historic encounters between Irakere and Trabuco that were held in Caracas on May 14 and 15 of 1981. This time, the blend of Afro-Cuban and Western elements in the music of Irakere is smoother, more organic, with the jazz influence diminished in favor of contagious dance rhythms. In the opener, Irakere pays tribute to the legendary tresista Arsenio Rodríguez with his popular-song composition El guayo de Catalina, which features a vocal performance by Oscar Valdés and a robust electric guitar solo from Carlos Emilio Morales. It is particularly interesting to hear Tres días, composed by Chucho Valdés, at the time a huge success in Colombia, Puerto Rico and Venezuela through Trabuco Venezolano's version sung by Carlos Daniel Palacios. In addition, Oscar Valdés is now joined by Palacios to share the vocal duties and Naranjo also collaborates on timbales. To close the set, Irakere looks backward with an invigorating rendition of Los caramelos, created by Gregorio Battle and sung by Valdés, with solos by Jorge Varona on trumpet and Morales on guitar. The other side opens with Formas libres, an instrumental theme created by Naranjo, where his Trabuco adopt a more radical view of music when dealing with complexity of expression, loosely based on free jazz experimentation and uncompromising ideas. The theme is composed of solos by Samuel del Real (piano), Gustavo Aranguren (trumpet) and Rafael Silva (trombone). But the band is at its most interesting when it stretches out, then comes Imágenes latinas, a warm homage to Conjunto Libre and trombonist Barry Rogers. This song provides an emotional vocal showcase for Palacios, and is interspersed with long solos by Lorenzo Barriendos (bass), William Mora (bongos), José Navarro (timbales) and Felipe Rengifo (congas), with impeccable support from the brass section. The closing track on the album, Tema, is a miniature instrumental that slows things down yet continues to maintain repeated listenings.

== Track listing ==
#	Song	Composer(s)	Vocal(s)	Solo(s)
A1	El guayo de Catalina	Arsenio Rodríguez	Oscar Valdés	Carlos Emilio Morales
A2	Tres días	Jesús Valdés	Oscar Valdés; Carlos Daniel Palacios	Alberto Naranjo (on timbales); Carlos Espósito (chorus)
A3	Los caramelos *	Gregorio Battle	Oscar Valdés	Jorge Varona; Carlos Emilio Morales
B4	Formas libres	Alberto Naranjo	Instrumental	Samuel del Real, Gustavo Aranguren, Rafael Silva
B5	Imágenes latinas	Bernardo Palombo; Andy González	Carlos Daniel Palacios	Lorenzo Barriendos, William Mora, José Navarro, Felipe Rengifo
B6	Tema	Alberto Naranjo	Instrumental	Orchestra Closing Theme
				Total time 41:46

- Erroneously labeled as El Caramelo, by Jesús Valdés

== Credits ==
=== Irakere ===
- Chucho Valdés - keyboards, arranger, director
- Carlos Emilio Morales - electric guitar, percussion
- Carlos del Puerto - bass guitar, chorus
- Enrique Plá - drums, percussion
- Jorge Alfonzo - congas, percussion
- Juan Munguía - trumpet, flugel horn, valve trombone
- Jorge Varona - trumpet, flugel horn, percussion
- Germán Velasco - soprano and alto saxophones, flute, chorus
- Carlos Averhoff - soprano and tenor saxophones, flute, chorus
- José Luis Cortés - baritone saxophone, flute, chorus
- Oscar Valdés - lead vocalist, percussion

=== El Trabuco Venezolano ===
- Alberto Naranjo - drums, arranger, director
- Samuel del Real - acoustic piano
- Lorenzo Barriendos - bass guitar
- José Navarro - timbales
- Felipe Rengifo - congas
- William Mora - bongos
- Luis Arias - lead trumpet
- Gustavo Aranguren - trumpet
- José Díaz F. - trumpet and flugel horn
- Manolo Pérez - trumpet and flugel horn
- Rafael Silva - lead trombone
- Alejandro Pérez Palma - trombone
- Leopoldo Escalante - trombone
- Carlos Daniel Palacios - lead singer and chorus
- Joe Ruiz - lead singer and chorus
- Carlos Espósito - lead singer and chorus

== Other credits ==
- Hosts: Phidias Danilo Escalona (Irakere) and Rafael Rivas (Trabuco)
- Artistic producers: Orlando Montiel and Alberto Naranjo
- Production manager: Prudencio Sánchez
- Staff coordinator: Freddy Sanz
- Graphic design: Miguel Angel Briceño and Orlando Montiel
- Label: Integra C. A. IG-10.041, 1982
- Place of recording: Poliedro de Caracas
- Recording engineer: Gustavo Quintero
- Mixing: Gustavo Quintero, Orlando Montiel and Alberto Naranjo, at Estudios del Este
- Produced in Caracas, Venezuela, 1982
