= Sofia Asunción Claro =

Chilean-born classical harpist

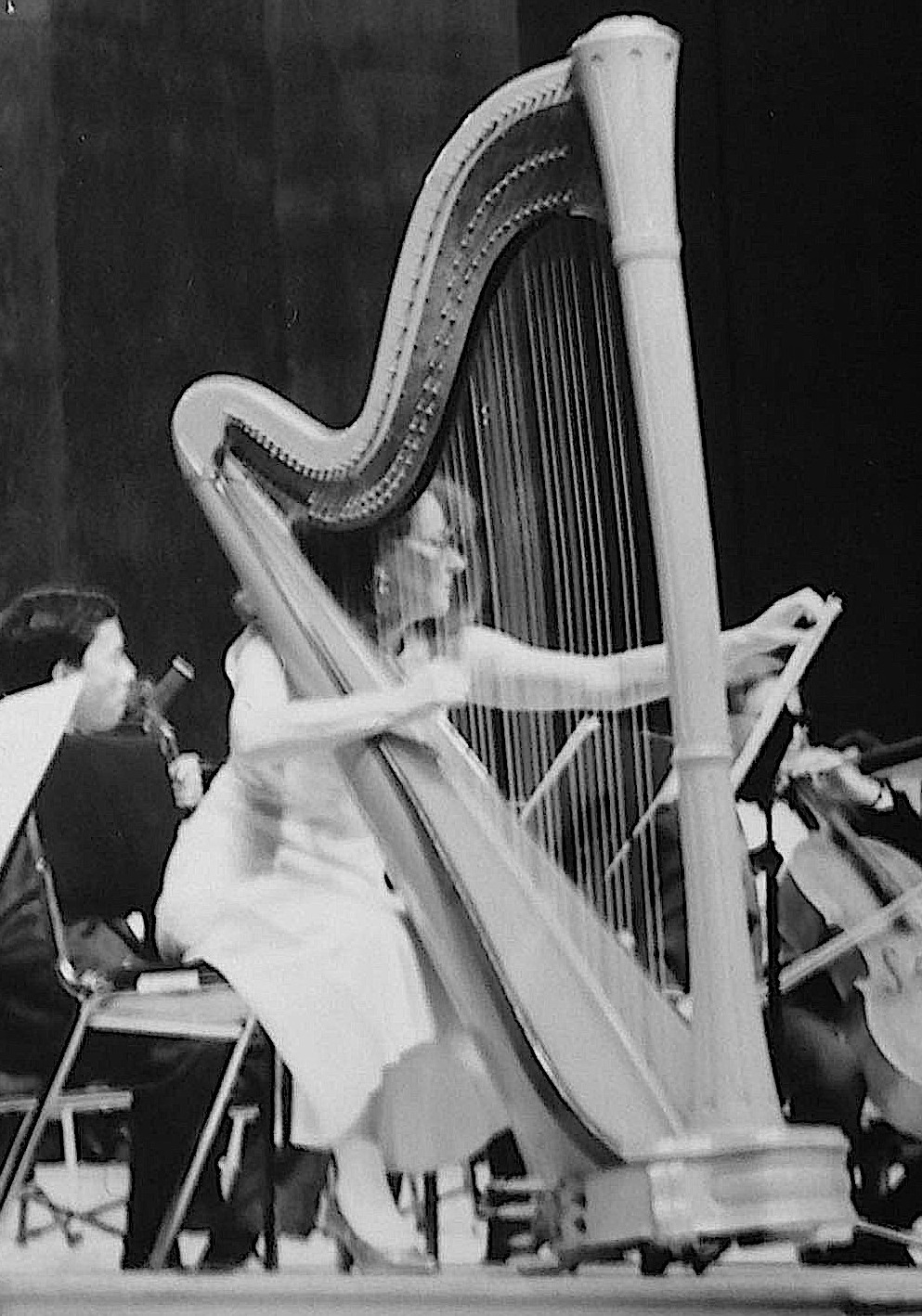
The harpist Sofia Asunción Claro

Sofia Asunción Claro (born in Santiago) is a Chilean-born classical harpist with a special interest in contemporary music. Since 1974, she has divided her time between Copenhagen, Denmark and Santiago, Chile.

== Biography ==
Ms. Claro was introduced to the harp by her mother at the age of 8 and shortly after initiated her studies at the Conservatorio Nacional de Musica de la Universidad de Chile. In 1964 she moved to Germany to study with Ursula Lendrot at the Hochschule für Music in Munich, and in 1966 she was admitted as a national student to the Conservatoire National Supérieur in Paris where she studied until 1968 with Gérard Devos. She was then admitted to the Royal Danish Academy of Music finalizing her studies in 1979 with Inga Graae and making Copenhagen her residency.

== Career ==
Since 1974, Claro has regularly given concerts across Scandinavia, Europe and Latin America as soloist with orchestra, in solo recitals, chamber music and in "Duo Claro" with Danish flutist Lars Graugaard. She performs the classical repertoire as well as contemporary music and she regularly holds master classes in connection with her concerts. Over the years she has developed close contact with several contemporary composers such as Nicola Sani, Fernando Garcia, Per Nørgård, Fausto Romitelli, Gustavo Becerra, Agostino Di Scipio and Åke Parmerud and she commissions and premieres a large body of works out of which more than 50 are dedicated to her. This has served to enhance not only the repertoire for acoustic harp but also for novel settings of harp and electronics, both with tape and with interactive computer, with several of these works becoming part of the harp's core repertoire.

In her Skonhed: En engel gik forbi, the Danish writer Dorthe Jørgensen mentions Sofia Asunción Claro with her album The Virtuoso Harp (1989) as one of the harpists who induces peacefulness at a time when stress has become an ailment on a par with cancer and heart disease. She appreciates her classical (rather than "fantasy") selection which contains works by the Russian composer Mikhail Glinka's "Variations on a Theme by Mozart" (1822) and "Pour le Tombeau d'Orphée" (1950) by the Dutch composer Marius Flothuis.

In preparing for the Second Festival of Contemporary Chilean Music in Europe, to be held in Copenhagen in 2003, in collaboration with the Cuban saxophonist Miguel Villafruela, Asunción Claro worked with several composers, including the Chilean saxophonist Miguel Villafruela and the Danish flautist Lars Graugaard. Chilean composers from different decades were selected to create works for the festival. They included Fernando García (1940s), Hernán Ramírez (1950s], Alejandro Guarello and Eduardo Cáceres (1960s), Aliocha Solovera and Andrés Ferrari (1970s). Unfortunately, for various reasons the festival could not take place.

Asunción Claro has played in radio broadcasts on Danmarks Radio since 2010. While in Denmark, she has released works for harp and electronics on the Dacapo label, including a neo-romantic composition by Ejnar Kanding to the lyrical "Song of Myself" by Sunleif Rasmussen. She was one of the highlighted artists in the 7 October 2006 – 14 January 2007 "Looking for Jerry" exhibit at the Silkeborg Bad Art Center in Denmark.

== Selected list of commissions, with dedications ==
=== Solo with symphony orchestra, chamber orchestra and large ensemble ===
- Gustavo Becerra: Concert for Harp and Orchestra (2001) - harp and orchestra
- Lars Graugaard: The Hand, Unveiled (1996) - harp and orchestra
- Jan Maegaard: Jeu Mosaîque (1995) - harp and orchestra
- Fernando Garcia: Navegaciones (1990) - harp, flute and string orchestra
- Lars Graugaard: Ophelia In The Garden (1989) - harp and string orchestra
- Per Nørgaard: King, Queen and Ace (1989) - harp and sinfonietta

=== Chamber groups ===
- Fernando Garcia: Horizon Carré (1996) - harp, soprano, flute, guitar
- Jorge Arriagada: Suite Ruziana No. 1 (2001) - harp, flute, cello, guitar, piano
- Aliocha Solovera: Silence, please (2001) - harp, flute, violin, cello, guitar, piano
- Ib Nørholm: Lys og Skygge (1989) - harp, organ
- Lars Graugaard: Five Ruba’iyat (1989) - harp, soprano, flute, guitar
- Svend Hvidtfelt Nielsen: Katafalk (1989/90) - harp, organ
- Hans Abrahamsen: Aria (1979) - harp, soprano, flute, cello, percussion

=== Solo and solo with electronics ===
- Robert Rowe: Moon on one side, sun on the other (2007) - harp, tape
- Kristine Burns: Nuage (2006) - harp, tape
- Alejandro Guarello: Apra’r Bo (1999) - harp solo
- Fausto Romitelli: Bad Trip Remix (1998) - harp, tape
- Nicola Sani: Isola Seconda (1997) - harp, tape
- Sunleif Rasmussen: The Song of a Child (1997) - harp, tape
- Gabriel Valverde: El Silencio ya no es el Silencio (1996) - harp, tape
- Lars Graugaard: Incrustations (1993–94) - harp, tape
- Åke Parmerud: String & Shadows (1993) - harp, tape
- Agostino Di Scipio: Some Strings Quiet, Some strings cry (1993) - harp, tape
- Ivar Frounberg: Worlds Apart (1993) - harp, tape
- Axel Borup-Jørgensen: Piece en Concert (1993) - harp solo
- Per Nørgård: The colour is dark (1989) - harp solo
- Erik Jørgensen: Music for Harp (1988) - harp solo

=== Selected discography ===
- J.S. Bach, Pescetti, Hindemith, Barfoed; Four Sonatas for the Harp (recital for solo harp); LP, point plp 5077, 1983; cassette, Cuatro Sonatas Para Arpa, CBS KNIA1221
- Glinka, Mudarra, Spohr, Albeniz, Schmidt, Britten, Flothuis, Salzedo, van Delden, Ibert; The Virtuoso Harp (recital for solo harp); CD, Fønix Music LC 6607; CD, El Arpa Virtuosa, Sony 4739
- Åke Parmerud: Strings & Shadows (harp and tape); CD, Jeu d’Ombres, empreintes digital.es IMED 0367; CD, constellations, Phono Suecia PSCD 91; Prix 94 Ars Electronica, ORF94
- Takayuki Rai: Transparency (harp and tape); CD, musiana 95, Classico CLASSCD 139
- Françaix, Graugaard, Hindemith, Persichetti, Ravel, Faure, Ibert, Nielsen (harp and flute); CD, Music For Harp And Flute, TUTL FKT063
- Nicola Sani: Non Tutte Le Isole Hanno Intorno Il Mare - Isola Seconda (harp and tape); CD, Music Worx PH M052400NS
- Parmerud, Lippe, Graugaard, Saariaho, Frounberg (harp and tape); CD, Centaur CRC 2284
- Kanding, Graugaard, Rasmussen, Frounberg, Fuzzy (harp and electronics); CD, dacapo 8.224113
- Graugaard, Blak, Maegaard, (harp and orchestra); CD, tutl FKT13,
- Gabriel Valverde: El Silencio Ya No Es El Silencio (harp solo); CD, Mode mode 94
- J.S. Bach, Boccherini, Spohr (harp and flute); cassette, CBS KNIA 1117; Classico CLASSCD 238; CD, Sony 4740
- Graugaard: Ophelia In The Garden (harp solo and string orchestra) and The Hand Unveiled (harp solo and symphony orchestra); CD, Classico CLASSCD 187/188
- Svend Hvidtfelt Nielsen: Catafalque (harp and organ); CD, dacapo 8.224018
