= 2013 FIBA Americas Championship =

Tournament details
- Host country: Venezuela
- City: Caracas
- Dates: August 30 – September 11
- Teams: 10
- Venue(s): 1 (in 1 host city)

Final positions
- Champions: Mexico (1st title)
- Runners-up: Puerto Rico
- Third place: Argentina
- Fourth place: Dominican Republic

Tournament statistics
- MVP: (Mexico) Gustavo Ayón
- Top scorer: (Argentina) Luis Scola (18.8 points per game)

The 2013 FIBA Americas Championship for Men, later known as the FIBA AmeriCup, was the qualifying tournament for FIBA Americas, for the 2014 FIBA World Cup, in Spain. This FIBA AmeriCup tournament was held in Caracas, Venezuela, from August 30, to September 11, 2013. The top four teams qualified for the 2014 FIBA World Cup.

Mexico defeated Puerto Rico, in the final, to win their first AmeriCup title.

== Qualification ==
- Central American and Caribbean Sub-Zone (2012 Centrobasket):
  - Dominican Republic
  - Puerto Rico
  - Jamaica
- North American Sub-Zone:
  - Canada
  - Mexico
- South American Sub-Zone (South American Basketball Championship 2012):
  - Argentina
  - Venezuela
  - Uruguay
  - Brazil
  - Paraguay

== Draw ==
The draw was held at the Catia Theatre in Caracas on February 28. This was how the teams were seeded:

Argentina (3); Brazil (9)	Puerto Rico (19); Dominican Republic (27)	Mexico (32); Uruguay (29)	Jamaica (83); Paraguay (55)	Venezuela (24); Canada (26)

As hosts, Venezuela picked first the group that they played at, and their final opponent in the preliminary round. Included are the last published FIBA World Rankings prior to the draw.

== Format ==
The ten teams were split into two groups. The best four teams of each group advanced to the second round, where the teams played against the four teams from the other group; each team carried over all points earned during the first round, except for those earned in the match against the team that was eliminated. The best four teams of this group advanced to the semifinals and were qualified for the 2014 FIBA World Cup. The United States, which won the Olympic Gold Medal in 2012, automatically qualified for the 2014 FIBA World Cup and chose not to participate in the 2013 Americas Championship. Originally, Panama were supposed to compete but was replaced by Mexico after FIBA implemented a suspension on the Panamanian Basketball Federation. Mexico was chosen as the next highest placed finisher in Panama's subcategory (COCABA) at the 2012 Centrobasket tournament.

== Preliminary round ==
Qualified for the second round

=== Group A ===
In Group A, team Puerto Rico secured their first round undefeated, as well as narrowly clinching their win against surprising newcomer Jamaica 88–82, while Canada and Uruguay also secured their place for the second round. Brazil lost all four games for the first time.

Team	Pld	W	L	PF	PA	PD	Pts
Puerto Rico	4	4	0	336	283	+53	8
Canada	4	3	1	336	276	+60	7
Uruguay	4	2	2	283	325	−42	6
Jamaica	4	1	3	290	317	−27	5
Brazil	4	0	4	276	320	−44	4

30 August 2013
11:00

Boxscore

Jamaica	64–85	Canada
Scoring by quarter: 14–19, 11–23, 25–18, 14–25
Pts: Uter 16; Rebs: Jordan, Uter 8 Asts: Ennis 5		Pts: C. Joseph, Heslip 17; Rebs: Thompson 12; Asts: C. Joseph 9

Poliedro de Caracas, Caracas
Referees: Lauren Bass (USA), Alejandro Chiti (ARG), Reynaldo Mercedes (DOM)

30 August 2013
17:00

Boxscore

Puerto Rico	72–65	Brazil
Scoring by quarter: 15–12, 16–17, 17–22, 24–14
Pts: Balkman 24; Rebs: Holland 9 Asts: Barea 4		Pts: Huertas 16; Rebs: Giovannoni 9 Asts: Huertas 5

Poliedro de Caracas, Caracas
Referees: Anthony Jordan (USA), José Reyes (MEX), Roberto Oliveros (VEN)

31 August 2013
11:00

Boxscore

Uruguay	68–66	Jamaica
Scoring by quarter: 17–17, 17–14, 14–19, 20–16
Pts: Batista 22; Rebs: Batista 14; Asts: García Morales 4		Pts: Samuels 19; Rebs: Uter 8 Asts: Ennis 4

Poliedro de Caracas, Caracas
Referees: Reynaldo Mercedes (DOM), José Reyes (MEX), Americo Rodríguez (VEN)

31 August 2013
13:30

Boxscore

Canada	67–83	Puerto Rico
Scoring by quarter: 13–19, 24–21, 21–19, 9–24
Pts: Nicholson 21; Rebs: Thompson 9 Asts: C. Joseph 3		Pts: Arroyo 20; Rebs: Balkman 11; Asts: Barea, Arroyo 4

Poliedro de Caracas, Caracas
Referees: Pablo Estevez (ARG), Eddie Viator (FRA), Roberto Oliveros (VEN)

1 September 2013
11:00

Boxscore

Brazil	62–91	Canada
Scoring by quarter: 22–19, 12–25, 12–24, 16–23
Pts: Giovannoni 11; Rebs: Giovannoni 8 Asts: Taylor, Huertas 3		Pts: C. Joseph 28; Rebs: C. Joseph 9 Asts: C. Joseph 4

Poliedro de Caracas, Caracas
Referees: Reynaldo Mercedes (DOM), Anthony Jordan (USA), Alejandro Chiti (ARG)

1 September 2013
19:30

Boxscore

Puerto Rico	93–69	Uruguay
Scoring by quarter: 29–18, 23–14, 26–23, 15–14
Pts: Arroyo, Galindo 19; Rebs: Balkman 8 Asts: Arroyo 8		Pts: García Morales 17; Rebs: four players 5 Asts: four players 3

Poliedro de Caracas, Caracas
Referees: Pablo Estevez (ARG), Roberto Oliveros (VEN), Americo Rodríguez (VEN)

2 September 2013
13:30

Boxscore

Jamaica	82–88	Puerto Rico
Scoring by quarter: 13–25, 20–23, 29–15, 20–25
Pts: Samuels 24; Rebs: Jordan 9 Asts: A. Scott 7		Pts: Barea 24; Rebs: Balkman 9 Asts: Arroyo 4

Poliedro de Caracas, Caracas
Referees: Reynaldo Mercedes (DOM), Alejandro Chiti (ARG), Lauren Bass (USA)

2 September 2013
17:00

Boxscore

Uruguay	79–73	Brazil
Scoring by quarter: 17–15, 19–18, 20–17, 23–23
Pts: Batista 22; Rebs: Batista 13; Asts: Fitipaldo 4		Pts: Giovannoni 20; Rebs: Giovannoni 10; Asts: Huertas 5

Poliedro de Caracas, Caracas
Referees: Pablo Estevez (ARG), José Reyes (MEX), Roberto Oliveros (VEN)

3 September 2013
19:30

Boxscore

Brazil	76–78	Jamaica
Scoring by quarter: 17–18, 19–21, 23–14, 17–25
Pts: Benite, Torres 12; Rebs: Batista 10; Asts: Huertas 13		Pts: Samuels 21; Rebs: Samuels 8 Asts: D. Scott 2

Poliedro de Caracas, Caracas
Referees: Eddie Viator (FRA), Juan García (ESP), Americo Rodríguez (VEN)

3 September 2013
22:00

Boxscore

Canada	93–67	Uruguay
Scoring by quarter: 29–11, 22–14, 24–23, 18–19
Pts: Nicholson 18; Rebs: Thompson 7 Asts: C. Joseph 7		Pts: Fitipaldo 18; Rebs: García Morales 5 Asts: Mazzarino 5

Poliedro de Caracas, Caracas
Referees: Reynaldo Mercedes (DOM), Alejandro Chiti (ARG), José Reyes (MEX)

=== Group B ===
Hosts Venezuela lost their first two games against surprising Mexico and Argentina, but managed to win two other games to advance the second round, despite having two losses in the game. The Mexican team lost their three-win streak to the Argentine basketball team, while Paraguay's poor efforts prevented them from winning a single game since their recent game in 2010.

Team	Pld	W	L	PF	PA	PD	Pts	Tie
Argentina	4	3	1	342	300	+42	7	1–0
Mexico	4	3	1	314	280	+34	7	0–1
Venezuela	4	2	2	272	277	−5	6	1–0
Dominican Republic	4	2	2	300	281	+19	6	0–1
Paraguay	4	0	4	249	339	−90	4	

30 August 2013
13:30

Boxscore

Argentina	95–60	Paraguay
Scoring by quarter: 30–15, 24–12, 19–21, 22–12
Pts: Campazzo 13; Rebs: Mata, Delía 7 Asts: Fernández 5		Pts: Araújo 23; Rebs: Fabio 7 Asts: Araújo 2

Poliedro de Caracas, Caracas
Referees: Cristiano Maranho (BRA), Eddie Viator (FRA), Andreia Silva (BRA)

30 August 2013
19:30

Boxscore

Venezuela	56–65	Mexico
Scoring by quarter: 7–16, 16–13, 16–16, 17–20
Pts: Smith, Bethelmy 10; Rebs: Bethelmy 9 Asts: Guillén 3		Pts: Ayón 22; Rebs: Ayón 18; Asts: Ayón 4

Poliedro de Caracas, Caracas
Referees: Jorge Vázquez (PUR), Stephen Seibel (CAN), Michael Weiland (CAN)

31 August 2013
17:00

Boxscore

Dominican Republic	91–72	Argentina
Scoring by quarter: 28–16, 13–23, 31–10, 19–23
Pts: Feldeine 21; Rebs: Martínez 13; Asts: three players 3		Pts: Scola, Laprovíttola 13; Rebs: Scola 7 Asts: Mata, Campazzo 5

Poliedro de Caracas, Caracas
Referees: Anthony Jordan (USA), Cristiano Maranho (BRA), Jorge Vázquez (PUR)

31 August 2013
19:30

Boxscore

Paraguay	70–75	Venezuela
Scoring by quarter: 17–16, 20–19, 17–21, 16–19
Pts: Araújo 22; Rebs: Fabio 9 Asts: Vallejos, Peralta 2		Pts: Sucre 15; Rebs: Sucre 9 Asts: Smith 5

Poliedro de Caracas, Caracas
Referees: Juan García (ESP), Héctor Uslenghi (URU), Andreia Silva (BRA)

1 September 2013
13:30

Boxscore

Mexico	86–65	Paraguay
Scoring by quarter: 29–9, 21–16, 21–14, 8–10
Pts: Méndez 17; Rebs: Mata 10; Asts: Meza 3		Pts: Fabio, Mellone 11; Rebs: Araújo 7 Asts: three players 2

Poliedro de Caracas, Caracas
Referees: Lauren Bass (USA), Stephen Seibel (CAN), Michael Weiland (CAN)

1 September 2013
17:00

Boxscore

Venezuela	70–65	Dominican Republic
Scoring by quarter: 20–12, 18–16, 15–14, 17–23
Pts: Smith 19; Rebs: Smith 7 Asts: Smith, J. Vargas 3		Pts: Feldeine 19; Rebs: Martínez 12; Asts: Feldeine 2

Poliedro de Caracas, Caracas
Referees: Cristiano Maranho (BRA), Jorge Vázquez (PUR), Héctor Uslenghi (URU)

2 September 2013
11:00

Boxscore

Dominican Republic	61–85	Mexico
Scoring by quarter: 20–29, 11–16, 17–15, 13–25
Pts: Martínez 16; Rebs: Martínez 7 Asts: Coronado 4		Pts: Méndez 26; Rebs: Mata 11; Asts: Méndez 5

Poliedro de Caracas, Caracas
Referees: Anthony Jordan (USA), Andreia Silva (BRA), Cristiano Maranho (BRA)

2 September 2013
19:30

Boxscore

Argentina	77–71	Venezuela
Scoring by quarter: 22–21, 15–23, 14–16, 26–11
Pts: Campazzo 18; Rebs: Scola 12; Asts: Campazzo 7		Pts: Pérez 14; Rebs: Smith 13; Asts: G. Vargas 5

Poliedro de Caracas, Caracas
Referees: Eddie Viator (FRA), Juan García (ESP), Michael Weiland (CAN)

3 September 2013
11:00

Boxscore

Paraguay	54–83	Dominican Republic
Scoring by quarter: 9–26, 15–27, 24–17, 6–13 game called with 4:23 remaining in 4th quarter due to power outage
Pts: Araújo 26; Rebs: Fabio, Mellone 5 Asts: three players 2		Pts: Towns 16; Rebs: Santana 9 Asts: four players 2

Poliedro de Caracas, Caracas
Referees: Michael Weiland (CAN), Lauren Bass (USA), Hector Uslenghi (URU)

3 September 2013
17:00

Boxscore

Mexico	78–98	Argentina
Scoring by quarter: 26–26, 14–19, 19–26, 19–27
Pts: Hernández 21; Rebs: Ayón 10; Asts: Gutierrez, Ayón 3		Pts: Scola 25; Rebs: Gutiérrez 7 Asts: Campazzo 9

Poliedro de Caracas, Caracas
Referees: Stephen Seibel (CAN), Cristiano Maranho (BRA), Jorge Vázquez (PUR)

== Second round ==
Puerto Rico narrowly clinched their place for the 2014 FIBA Basketball World Cup against surprising hosts Venezuela in an 85–86 thriller of an overtime match. Meanwhile, upstart Mexico also clinched their position for the World Cup from their performance, while Dominican Republic and Argentina also secured their place for the World Cup. Despite the efforts, the Canadian team were unable to put up a defensive and offensive play, thus eliminating the team for the second time since 2011. Newcomers Jamaica was also eliminated, despite winning against the Argentine team, whereas Uruguay were unable to make their debut for the Championship round, losing half of the matches throughout the Second Round.

Qualified for the semifinals

Team	Pld	W	L	PF	PA	PD	Pts	Tie
Mexico	7	5	2	548	525	+23	12	2–0
Dominican Republic	7	5	2	561	523	+38	12	1–1
Puerto Rico	7	5	2	587	548	+39	12	0–2
Argentina	7	4	3	564	545	+19	11	1–0
Venezuela	7	4	3	511	501	+10	11	0–1
Canada	7	3	4	534	499	+35	10	
Uruguay	7	1	6	482	584	−102	8	1–0
Jamaica	7	1	6	527	589	−62	8	0–1

5 September 2013
11:00

Boxscore

Dominican Republic	78–60	Jamaica
Scoring by quarter: 17–11, 25–18, 15–16, 21–15
Pts: Feldeine 22; Rebs: Báez 10; Asts: Báez 4		Pts: A. Scott 21; Rebs: A. Scott 8 Asts: A. Scott, Ewing Jr. 2

Poliedro de Caracas, Caracas
Referees: Juan García (ESP), José Reyes (MEX), Andreia Silva (BRA)

5 September 2013
13:30

Boxscore

Mexico	67–89	Canada
Scoring by quarter: 18–21, 13–19, 27–20, 9–29
Pts: Méndez 23; Rebs: Ayón 11; Asts: Stoll 5		Pts: Heslip 21; Rebs: Thompson 12; Asts: C. Joseph 6

Poliedro de Caracas, Caracas
Referees: Cristiano Maranho (BRA), Alejandro Chiti (ARG), Roberto Oliveros (VEN)

5 September 2013
17:00

Boxscore

Argentina	80–94	Puerto Rico
Scoring by quarter: 23–14, 26–30, 13–26, 18–24
Pts: Scola 23; Rebs: Scola, Mata 8 Asts: Campazzo 8		Pts: Balkman 23; Rebs: Balkman 6 Asts: Arroyo 5

Poliedro de Caracas, Caracas
Referees: Anthony Jordan (USA), Eddie Viator (FRA), Stephen Seibel (CAN)

5 September 2013
19:30

Boxscore

Venezuela	70–64	Uruguay
Scoring by quarter: 18–13, 17–13, 21–21, 14–17
Pts: Pérez 14; Rebs: Smith 8 Asts: Smith 5		Pts: Mazzarino 18; Rebs: Calfani, Newsome 6 Asts: Bavosi 3

Poliedro de Caracas, Caracas
Referees: Pablo Estevez (ARG), Reynaldo Mercedes (DOM), Lauren Bass (USA)

6 September 2013
11:00

Boxscore

Jamaica	81–75	Argentina
Scoring by quarter: 17–16, 11–15, 22–24, 31–20
Pts: Rose 21; Rebs: Uter 11; Asts: Ennis 2		Pts: Scola 26; Rebs: Scola 8 Asts: Scola, Campazzo 4

Poliedro de Caracas, Caracas
Referees: Reynaldo Mercedes (DOM), Héctor Uslenghi (URU), Andreia Silva (BRA)

6 September 2013
13:30

Boxscore

Uruguay	73–87	Mexico
Scoring by quarter: 11–18, 16–29, 20–22, 26–18
Pts: Batista 25; Rebs: Batista 19; Asts: Fitipaldo 4		Pts: Ayón 17; Rebs: Hernández 10; Asts: Stoll 6

Poliedro de Caracas, Caracas
Referees: Eddie Viator (FRA), Stephen Seibel (CAN), Americo Rodríguez (VEN)

6 September 2013
17:00

Boxscore

Canada	59–64	Venezuela
Scoring by quarter: 14–16, 12–19, 14–14, 19–15
Pts: C. Joseph 14; Rebs: Thompson 20; Asts: Doornekamp, Thompson 3		Pts: Colmenares 13; Rebs: Smith 6 Asts: Smith, J. Vargas 3

Poliedro de Caracas, Caracas
Referees: Jorge Vázquez (PUR), Juan García (ESP), Alejandro Chiti (ARG)

6 September 2013
19:30

Boxscore

Puerto Rico	84–99	Dominican Republic
Scoring by quarter: 20–15, 20–21, 23–26, 21–37
Pts: Arroyo 22; Rebs: Balkman 7 Asts: Arroyo 6		Pts: Martínez 21; Rebs: Martínez 11; Asts: Báez 6

Poliedro de Caracas, Caracas
Referees: Pablo Estevez (ARG), Cristiano Maranho (BRA), Roberto Oliveros (VEN)

7 September 2013
11:00

Boxscore

Mexico	100–89	Jamaica
Scoring by quarter: 19–20, 25–26, 25–22, 31–21
Pts: Hernández 25; Rebs: Hernández 5 Asts: Méndez 7		Pts: Jordan 24; Rebs: Jordan 6 Asts: A. Scott 4

Poliedro de Caracas, Caracas
Referees: Pablo Estevez (ARG), Stephen Seibel (CAN), Roberto Oliveros (VEN)

7 September 2013
13:30

Boxscore

Argentina	89–63	Uruguay
Scoring by quarter: 24–24, 19–11, 20–12, 26–16
Pts: Scola 17; Rebs: Mata 10; Asts: Campazzo 7		Pts: Mazzarino 14; Rebs: Batista 11; Asts: Fitipaldo 5

Poliedro de Caracas, Caracas
Referees: Jorge Vázquez (PUR), Juan García (ESP), Michael Weiland (CAN)

7 September 2013
17:00

Boxscore

Dominican Republic	81–74	Canada
Scoring by quarter: 18–28, 27–16, 14–13, 22–17
Pts: Feldeine 20; Rebs: Vargas 5 Asts: five players 2		Pts: Nicholson 29; Rebs: Doornekamp, Thompson 6 Asts: C. Joseph 4

Poliedro de Caracas, Caracas
Referees: Cristiano Maranho (BRA), Eddie Viator (FRA), Héctor Uslenghi (URU)

7 September 2013
19:30

Boxscore

Venezuela	85–86 (OT)	Puerto Rico
Scoring by quarter: 28–11, 15–15, 21–31, 15–22, Overtime: 6–7
Pts: Smith 26; Rebs: Smith 13; Asts: Smith 5		Pts: Barea 30; Rebs: Balkman 12; Asts: Barea 6

Poliedro de Caracas, Caracas
Referees: Anthony Jordan (USA), Alejandro Chiti (ARG), José Reyes (MEX)

8 September 2013
11:00

Boxscore

Uruguay	78–86	Dominican Republic
Scoring by quarter: 19–17, 21–22, 14–21, 24–26
Pts: Batista 23; Rebs: Batista 13; Asts: three players 3		Pts: Martínez 17; Rebs: Martínez 12; Asts: Báez 4

Poliedro de Caracas, Caracas
Referees: Stephen Seibel (CAN), Alejandro Chiti (ARG), Roberto Oliveros (VEN)

8 September 2013
13:30

Boxscore

Canada	67–73	Argentina
Scoring by quarter: 18–13, 18–19, 20–29, 11–12
Pts: C. Joseph 19; Rebs: Thompson 10; Asts: Doornekamp 3		Pts: Scola 28; Rebs: Scola 7 Asts: Campazzo 8

Poliedro de Caracas, Caracas
Referees: Eddie Viator (FRA), Juan García (ESP), José Reyes (MEX)

8 September 2013
17:00

Boxscore

Puerto Rico	59–66	Mexico
Scoring by quarter: 17–25, 18–12, 9–12, 15–17
Pts: Ayuso 17; Rebs: Clemente 9 Asts: Rodríguez 7		Pts: Alonzo 13; Rebs: Mata 10; Asts: Meza 5

Poliedro de Caracas, Caracas
Referees: Cristiano Maranho (BRA), Anthony Jordan (USA), Héctor Uslenghi (URU)

8 September 2013
19:30

Boxscore

Jamaica	85–95	Venezuela
Scoring by quarter: 10–19, 29–21, 20–21, 26–34
Pts: Ewing Jr. 16; Rebs: Uter, Jordan 6 Asts: Rose, A. Scott 4		Pts: Romero 23; Rebs: J. Vargas 8 Asts: G. Vargas, Romero 4

Poliedro de Caracas, Caracas
Referees: Pablo Estevez (ARG), Jorge Vázquez (PUR), Reynaldo Mercedes (DOM)

== Final round ==
Semi-finals
10 September
Mexico	76
Argentina	70
10 September
Dominican Republic	67
Puerto Rico	79

Final
11 September
Mexico	91
Puerto Rico	89
Third place
11 September
Argentina	103
Dominican Republic	93

=== Semifinals ===
Mexico avenged their first-round loss to world third-ranked Argentina, becoming the first team to advance to the final round. Meanwhile, Puerto Rico avenged their second-round loss against the Dominican team to secure their place in the final match against Mexico.

10 September 2013
17:00

Boxscore

Mexico	76–70	Argentina
Scoring by quarter: 20–14, 13–23, 20–21, 23–12
Pts: Ayón 24; Rebs: Ayón 12; Asts: three players 3		Pts: Scola 18; Rebs: Scola 8 Asts: Scola 5

Poliedro de Caracas, Caracas
Referees: Cristiano Maranho (BRA), Eddie Viator (FRA), Juan García (ESP)

10 September 2013
19:30

Boxscore

Dominican Republic	67–79	Puerto Rico
Scoring by quarter: 15–21, 17–17, 17–25, 18–16
Pts: Baez 12; Rebs: Martínez 12; Asts: Sosa 4		Pts: Arroyo 20; Rebs: Balkman 14; Asts: Barea 8

Poliedro de Caracas, Caracas
Referees: Anthony Jordan (USA), Stephen Seibel (CAN), Michael Weiland (CAN)

=== Third place match ===
11 September 2013
17:00

Boxscore

Dominican Republic	93–103	Argentina
Scoring by quarter: 20–26, 25–19, 23–24, 25–34
Pts: Sosa 20; Rebs: Martínez; Asts: Sosa, Baez 3		Pts: Campazzo 31; Rebs: Scola 9 Asts: Campazzo 11

Poliedro de Caracas, Caracas
Referees: Anthony Jordan (USA), Eddie Viator (FRA), Stephen Seibel (CAN)

=== Final ===
11 September 2013
19:30

Boxscore

Puerto Rico	89–91	Mexico
Scoring by quarter: 18–26, 27–22, 26–18, 18–25
Pts: Arroyo 23; Rebs: Barea, Balkman 5 Asts: Barea 4		Pts: Harris 23; Rebs: Ayón 16; Asts: Gutierrez 4

Poliedro de Caracas, Caracas
Referees: Pablo Estevez (ARG), Reynaldo Mercedes (DOM), Juan García (ESP)

== Awards ==
2013 FIBA Americas champions

Mexico
First title

Most Valuable Player
(Mexico) Gustavo Ayón

=== All-Tournament Team ===
- PG – (Argentina) Facundo Campazzo
- SG – (Puerto Rico) J. J. Barea
- SF – (Puerto Rico) Renaldo Balkman
- PF – (Argentina) Luis Scola
- C – (Mexico) Gustavo Ayón (MVP)

== Final ranking ==
Qualified for the 2014 FIBA World Cup.
Received Wild Card for the 2014 FIBA World Cup.

Rank	Team	Record
1st place, gold medalist(s)	Mexico	8–2
2nd place, silver medalist(s)	Puerto Rico	7–3
3rd place, bronze medalist(s)	Argentina	6–4
4	Dominican Republic	6–4
5	Venezuela	5–3
6	Canada	4–4
7	Uruguay	2–6
8	Jamaica	2–6
9	Brazil	0–4
10	Paraguay	0–4

== Statistical leaders ==
Points

Name	PPG
(Paraguay) Guillermo Araújo	21.3
(Argentina) Luis Scola	18.8
(Puerto Rico) Renaldo Balkman	18.7
(Mexico) Gustavo Ayón	17.5
(Uruguay) Esteban Batista	16.8

Rebounds

Name	RPG
(Uruguay) Esteban Batista	10.4
(Canada) Tristan Thompson	10.0
(Dominican Republic) Jack Michael Martínez	9.4
(Mexico) Gustavo Ayón	9.2
(Puerto Rico) Renaldo Balkman	8.9

Assists

Name	APG
(Brazil) Marcelinho Huertas	6.5
(Argentina) Facundo Campazzo	6.2
(Canada) Cory Joseph	4.4
(Puerto Rico) José Juan Barea	4.2
(Puerto Rico) Carlos Arroyo	4.1

Blocks

Name	BPG
(Mexico) Gustavo Ayón	1.4
(Puerto Rico) Renaldo Balkman	1.4
(Venezuela) Miguel Marriaga	1.3
(Mexico) Lorenzo Mata	1.1
(Dominican Republic) Francisco García	1.0

Steals

Name	SPG
(Puerto Rico) Renaldo Balkman	2.8
(Venezuela) Donta Smith	2.1
(Jamaica) Akeem Scott	1.8
(Argentina) Facundo Campazzo	1.7
(Puerto Rico) Carlos Arroyo	1.7

== FIBA broadcasting rights ==
Country	Broadcaster
Argentina	TyC Sports
Brazil	ESPN Brasil
Brazil	SporTV
Canada	Sportsnet 360
Chile	Directv Sports
Philippines	Basketball TV
Puerto Rico	Telemundo
USA	ESPN3
Venezuela	Tves
Venezuela	Meridiano Television
Venezuela	Directv Sports
