= Noé Alonzo =

Mexican basketball player (born 1983)

Medal record

Men's basketball

Representing Mexico

FIBA AmeriCup
Gold medal – first place	2013 Venezuela	

Noé Alonzo Chávez (born December 28, 1983) is a Mexican professional basketball player. He is a 6'8" Forward who currently plays for Aguacateros de Michoacán, in the Liga Nacional de Baloncesto Profesional in Mexico. Born in Chihuahua, Mexico, he is a member of the Mexico national basketball team.

== College career ==
Alonzo attended two years of college for NCAA Division II Independent Grand Canyon University. He was named Division II Independent Player of the Year both his junior and senior season. During his senior season, Alonzo averaged 20.5 points and 5.3 rebounds per game.

== Professional career ==
Since turning professional in 2006, Alonzo has spent his entire career in the Mexican professional league. His best season, based on averages, was his first season for Correcaminos Matamoros UAT, in which he averaged 18.5 points and 4.8 rebounds per game. After this season, he moved to Lobos Grises UAD before playing the 2008–09 season with Tecos UAG. With Tecos in 2008–09, he averaged 14.5 points and 3 rebounds per game for the 48–16 team. He was also a participant in the All-Star Game while playing with Tecos. In 2009-2010 the following season he move on to represent the UV Halcones from the city of xalapa in the state of Veracruz. His averages improved to 22.5 points a game 8 rebounds per game and became a champion with the Halcones. The following year, Alonzo was traded to Halcones Xalapa rival team; Halcones Rojos Veracruz. Where yet again became a champion in 2010–2011. He averaged 21.5 points and 10 rebounds a game. Following season of 2012-2013 he continued to play with Halcones Rojos and was one of the top point leaders of his team averaging 25.5 points a game 8 rebounds and 4 assists. He did fall short from having a third consecutive championship but was able to represent Mexico in the 2013 FIBA Americas Championship in Venezuela. Who then made history and won the gold medal and a ticket to compete in the 2014 FIBA World Cup in Spain. Before making history the Mexico National Team had never qualified during the past 40 plus years. Before heading the Spain to play in the World Cup, Alonzo participated with the Mexico National Team in the 2014 Centrobasket in Tepic, Nayarit, Mexico. He helped his team beat rival Puerto Rico for the gold medal. Unfortunately Alonzo suffered an ankle injury and was not able to compete in the 2014 World Cup. He was able to showcase his talents in 2012-2013 where he represented Caciques from the city of Humacao in Puerto Rico and competed in the BSN Puerto Rican League. Averaged 15 points a game 5 rebounds and 5 assists. He returned to Mexico to continue playing in the LNBP (Liga Nacional Basquetbol Profesional) and In 2014-2015 he returned to UV Halcones Xalapa where he averaged 15.2 points per game 5 rebounds and 5 assists. He then was traded the following season in 2015–2016 to the Fuerza Regia de Monterrey.

== National team career ==
Alonzo made his debut for the Mexico national basketball team at the 2008 Centrobasket, averaging 3.8 points per game in limited action off the bench. He also competed with the team at the FIBA Americas Championship 2009.

In 2013, Alonzo helped lead Mexico to victory in the gold medal game against Puerto Rico at the FIBA Americas Championship.
