= Luis Nubiola =

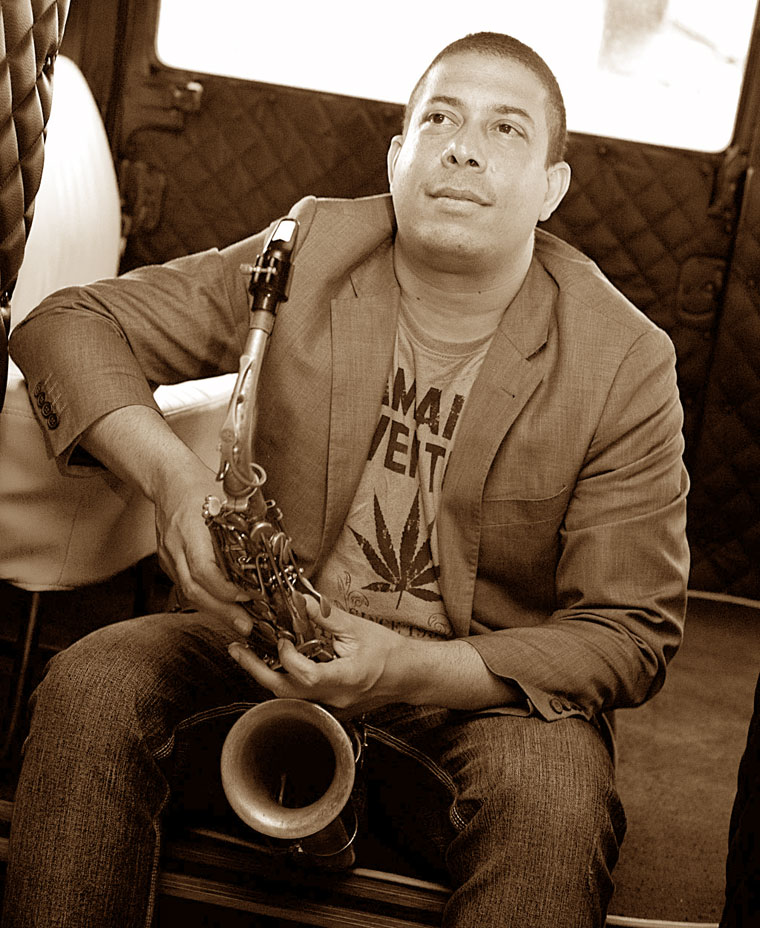

Background information
- Born: May 28, 1974 (age 51); Cuba
- Genres: Jazz
- Occupations: Saxophonist, composer, teacher
- Instrument: Saxophone
- Website: luisnubiola.com

Luis Nubiola (born May 28, 1974) is a Cuban-born jazz saxophonist, composer and teacher.

== Early life in Cuba ==
Luis is graduated as an instrumentalist saxophone teacher from the National Conservatory of Music in Havana Amadeo Roldan. He studied under the class of Carlos Averhoff.

He joined the Cuban music group PG, under the direction of conductor and flutist José Luis Cortes (El Tosco), founder of the group NG La Banda.

== Career goes on ==
In 2001, Luis Nubiola moved to Costa Rica. In December 2005 he recorded his first CD, a musical production under the name of “Nubiola”. In December 2008, Luis Nubiola produced “Live at Jazz Café” the first Jazz DVD ever recorded in Costa Rica together with Dart. This DVD is a live version of “Nubiola” CD which within the same year, made him the winner of the ACAM award as “Composer of the Year in Jazz Genre”. In his new material “914”, also with Dart and awarded as Best Album of the Year 2009, was a double DVD/CD.

Since 2009, Luis Nubiola lives in Europe. Luis Nubiola Trio and his release: "Memories from the Baltic", he is promoting his work and recording new material with musicians from Poland. With these artists, Luis Nubiola fuses aspects of his Cuban culture and the recognized tradition of Polish jazz, whilst incorporating aspects of the traditional folk music of both cultures.

The recording "O3", is an international coalition with his friend Frank Parker(USA) and Marcin Checzke (Poland), once again forming a trio with special guests, Wojciech Olszewski and Krzysztof Dys (piano) and Marcin Mały Górny (pads).

Luis Nubiola Live at the Music Theatre in Lodz (feat. Jose Torres), five tunes with a special guest, the Cuban percussionist Jose Torres, who has lived in Poland for over thirty years. This material is part of a series of songs composed by Luis Nubiola during a four months visit to the Republic of Turkey. One of these tunes, “Aturk”, is dedicated to the father of the Turkish homeland, Mustafa Kemal Atatürk.

Along with Jose Torres this material features great Polish musicians such as Wojciech Olszewski on piano, Krzysztof Szmańda drums and Marcin Chenczke double bass.

The Music Agency Polskie Radio invites 1 April at 7 pm to Lutosławski Studio for the concert promoting the album of the great saxophonist Luis Nubiola "Global Friendship".

Global Friendship is an idea to unify compositions from great musicians and friends who has residence in such as different places as Cuba, Poland, Costa Rica, USA, Spain etc. This album has the participation of Krzysztof Szmanda drums, Marcin Chenczke bass Krzysztof Dys piano, like in previous recordings, including this time as special guests the trombonist Michał Tomaszczyk and Ola Trzaska voice.

Luis Nubiola had a special appearance in the Film "Cold War" official trailer winner of Best Director Cannes Film Festival 2018.

== Discography ==
- "Nubiola" (2005).
- "Live at the Jazz Café" (2007).
- "914" (2008).
- "Memories from the Baltic" (2012).
- "Nubiola / Chenczke / Parker: 03" (2015).
- "Luis Nubiola Live at the Music Theatre in Lodz (feat. Jose Torres)" (2015).
- "Global Friendship" (2017).

== Awards and honors ==
- First place in the national musical contest Amadeo Roldan, 1990.
- ACAM (Association of Composers and Musical Authors of Costa Rica) for best Jazz Album of the Year, "Nubiola", 2007
- "914" Best Jazz Album, 2009
