= Poliedro de Caracas =

Indoor sporting arena located in Venezuela

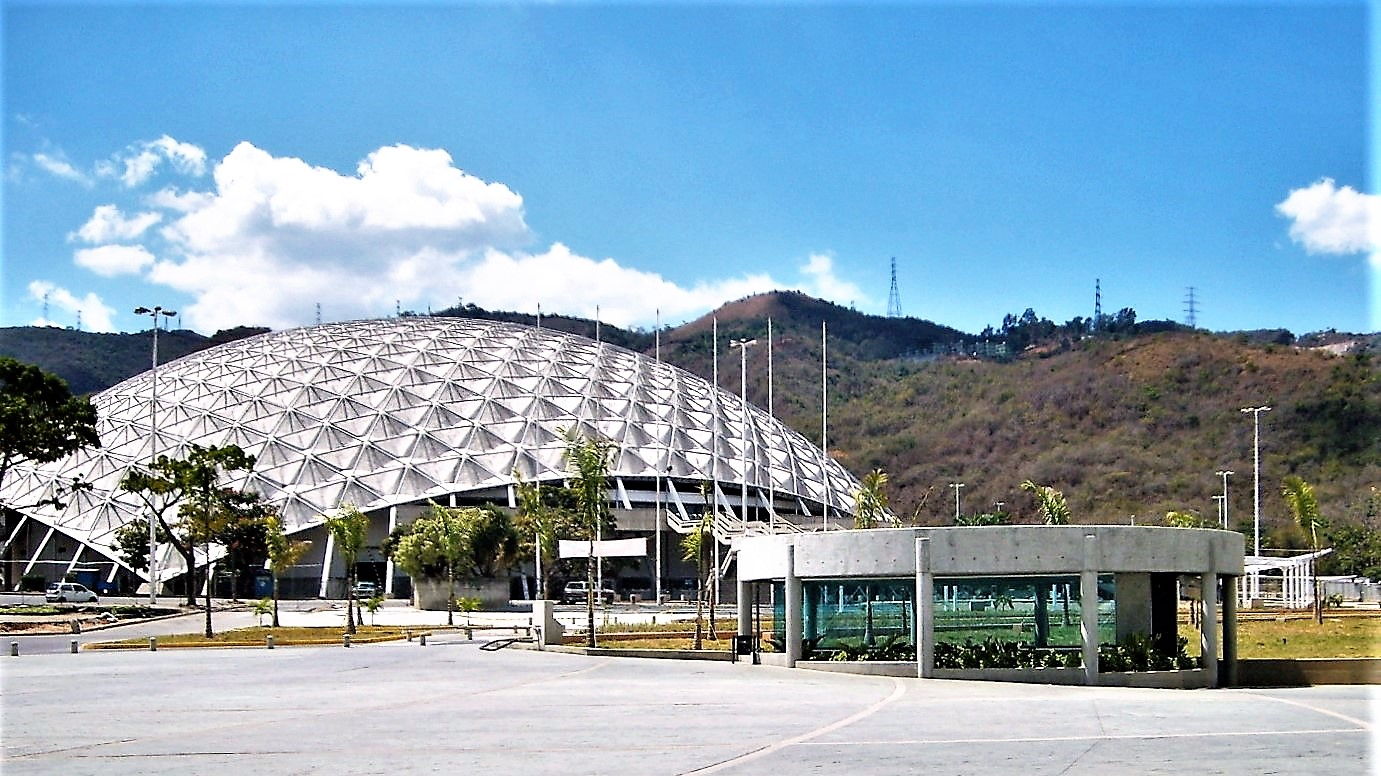
- The exterior of Poliedro de Caracas.
- Interactive map of Poliedro de Caracas
- Location: Caracas, Venezuela
- Coordinates: 10.4337°N 66.9384°W
- Owner: Polyhedron Foundation of Caracas (Venezuelan State)
- Capacity: Concerts: 20,000; Sports: 13,500

Construction
- Opened: March 26, 1974
- Renovated: 2013
- Architect: Jimmy Alcock

Tenant
- 2013 FIBA AmeriCup

The Poliedro de Caracas ("Caracas Polyhedron Arena") is an indoor sports arena, located on the grounds adjacent to Hipodromo La Rinconada, in Caracas, Venezuela. It was designed by architect Thomas C. Howard of Synergetics, Inc., in Raleigh, NC, in 1971. However, the geodesic dome was not concluded, until 1974, when US firm Charter Industries, along with Synergetics, Inc. designed and manufactured the geodesic dome in Raleigh, NC.

It is housed beneath a geodesic dome, with a capacity of 20,000 people for concerts and 13,500 people for sporting events. The arena is used for concerts, sporting events such as basketball, volleyball, boxing, ice skating shows, and for circuses, and trade expositions, like auto shows, and expomuebles (furniture). Lately, it has also been used for government-sponsored political events.

American Pop-star Michael Jackson was to perform a concert on 12 November 1993 but was cancelled due to his health problems.

Rent rates for Poliedro de Caracas on concerts and some sporting events ranges from $400-$1000 per day

== History ==
Poliedro de Caracas was finished in 1974, and officially inaugurated with the fight between George Foreman and Ken Norton, on March 26, 1974. It also served as the stage for many local acts, like Melissa, Yordano and Ilan Chester, among others, in addition to international acts that visited Venezuela.

One of the main events that took place each year in El Poliedro (up to 2009, 2013 and since 2022), is the Miss Venezuela beauty pageant. The Poliedro was the main venue of the 2013 FIBA AmeriCup, which determined the final four participants of the 2014 FIBA World Cup.

== Top concerts ==
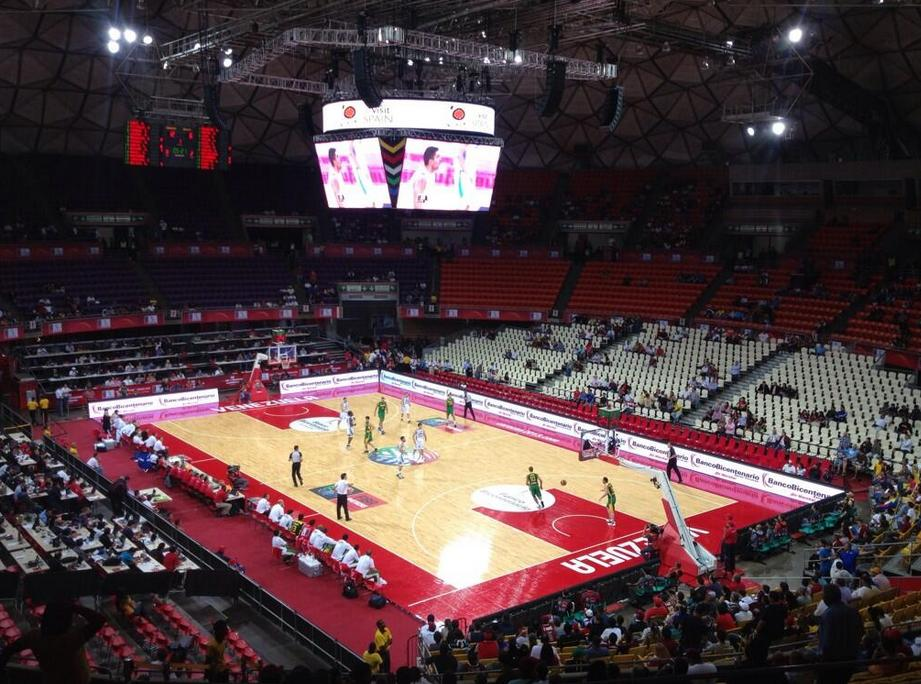
Inside view of the Poliedro de Caracas in 2013

The following is an incomplete list of the most famous artists who have performed at the Poliedro de Caracas:

Country	Artist	Year
USA	The Jackson 5	1977
UK	Peter Frampton	1980
UK	The Police	1981
UK	Queen	1981
CUB	Irakere	1981
CAN	Saga	1982
USA	Van Halen	1983
PRI	Héctor Lavoe	1983
USA	Joan Jett	1984
CAN	Saga	1984
ESP	Obús	1984
VEN	Melissa	1985
VEN	Melissa	1986
ESP	Mecano	1987
USAVEN	Quiet Riot & Franklin Holland Proyect	1986
CAN	Saga	1988
VEN	Melissa & Ricardo Montaner	1988
ESP	Mecano	1989
USA	Cyndi Lauper	1989
ARG	Soda Stereo	1991
USA	REO Speedwagon	1991
COL	Kraken	1991
ITA	Luciano Pavarotti	1991
ESP	Mecano	1992
UK	Marillion	1992
USA	Guns N' Roses	November 25, 1992
UKVEN	Iron Maiden & Gillman	1992
USA	REO Speedwagon	1992
CUB	Gloria Estefan	1992
ARG	Soda Stereo	1993
UK	Jon Anderson	1993
USA	Michael Jackson (cancelled)	1993
USA	Poison	1993
GERVEN	Scorpions & Arkangel	1994
USA	Whitney Houston	1994
SWE	Roxette	1995
ARGCOL	Soda Stereo & Aterciopelados	1995
ARG	Charly García	1995
ITA	Laura Pausini	1997
MEX	Luis Miguel	1999
USAVEN	Metallica & Gillman	1999
UK	UB40	1999
COL	Aterciopelados	1999
CAN	Alanis Morissette	1999
COL	Shakira	2000
UK	Eric Clapton	2001
USA	Backstreet Boys	2001
COL	Shakira	2003
USA	Dream Theater	2005
USA	Hilary Duff	2005
USAVEN	Slipknot & Candy 66	2005
GER	Helloween	2006
PRI	Wisin & Yandel	2006
USA	Slayer	2006
USA	Deftones	2006
UK	Jamiroquai	2006
FRA	Manu Chao	2006
UK	Fatboy Slim	2006
UK	Motörhead	2007
MEX	Luis Miguel	2007
USA	Incubus	2008
USA	My Chemical Romance	2008
USA	Nine Inch Nails	2008
AUS	Kylie Minogue	2008
UK	Iron Maiden	2009
USAVEN	Guns N' Roses & Los Pixel	2010
USA	Aerosmith	2010
CAN	Cirque du Soleil	2013
USA	The Illusionists	2013
ARG	Violetta	2013
USA	Aerosmith	2013
COL	Aterciopelados	2014
NED	Nicky Romero	2014
USA	Romeo Santos	2014
ENGCOLVENARG	Carcass, Masacre, Krueger, Rata Blanca & Escudo	2014
MEXUSA	Brujeria & Dia De Los Muertos	2015

== See also ==
- La Rinconada Hippodrome
