= Irakere =

Cuban band founded by pianist Chucho Valdés

- Origin: Havana, Cuba
- Genres: Songo, Latin jazz, jazz fusion, Afro-Cuban jazz
- Years active: 1973–present
- Labels: Areito, Bembe, Columbia, Milestone, Blue Note, Far Out
- Members: Jorge Luis Valdés Chicoy; Irving Michel Acao; Basilio Márquez; Julio Padrón; Adel González; Maikel Ante
- Past members: Chucho Valdés; Arturo Sandoval; Paquito D'Rivera; Anga Díaz; Carlos Emilio Morales; Carlos Averhoff; Carlos del Puerto; Oscar Valdés; Jorge Varona; José Luis Cortés "El Tosco"; Bernardo Garcia; Enrique Plá; Jorge Alfonso "El Niño"; Armando Cuervo; Carlos Barbón; Germán Velazco; Juan Munguía; José Miguel Crego "El Greco"; César López; Alfred Thompson; Orlando Valle "Maraca"; Adalberto Lara; Mayra Caridad Valdés; Jorge Reyes; Román Filiú; Lázaro Alfonso "El Tato"; Chuchito Valdés; José Miguel; Fran Padilla; Mario Hernanadez "El Indio"

Irakere (faux-Yoruba for "forest") is a Cuban band founded by pianist Chucho Valdés (son of Bebo Valdés) in 1973. They won the Grammy Award for Best Latin Recording in 1980 with their album Irakere. Irakere was innovative in Afro-Cuban jazz and Cuban popular dance music. The group used a wide array of percussion instruments, such as batá, abakuá and arará drums, chequerés, erikundis, maracas, claves, cencerros, bongó, tumbadoras (congas), and güiro.

== History ==
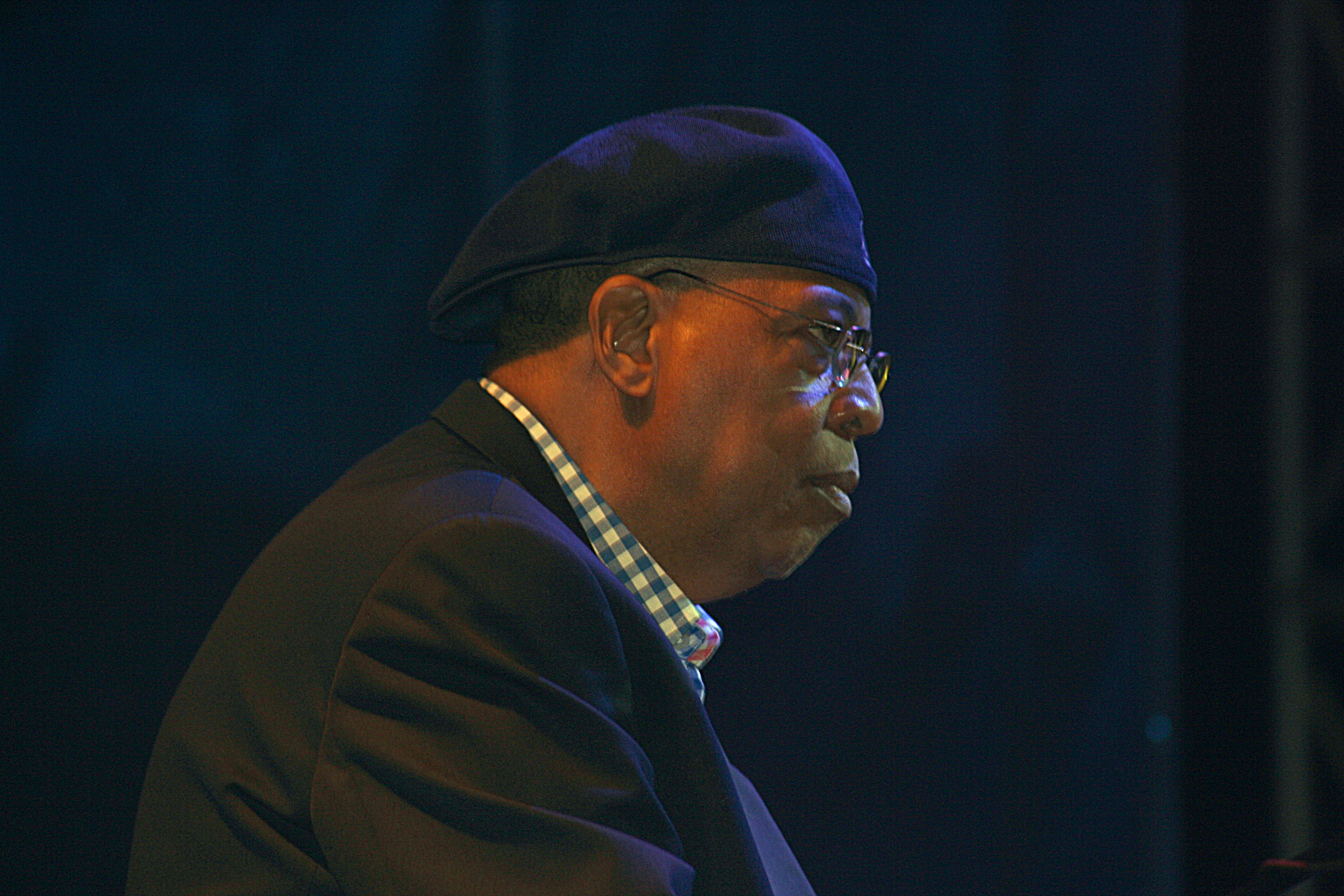
Chucho Valdés

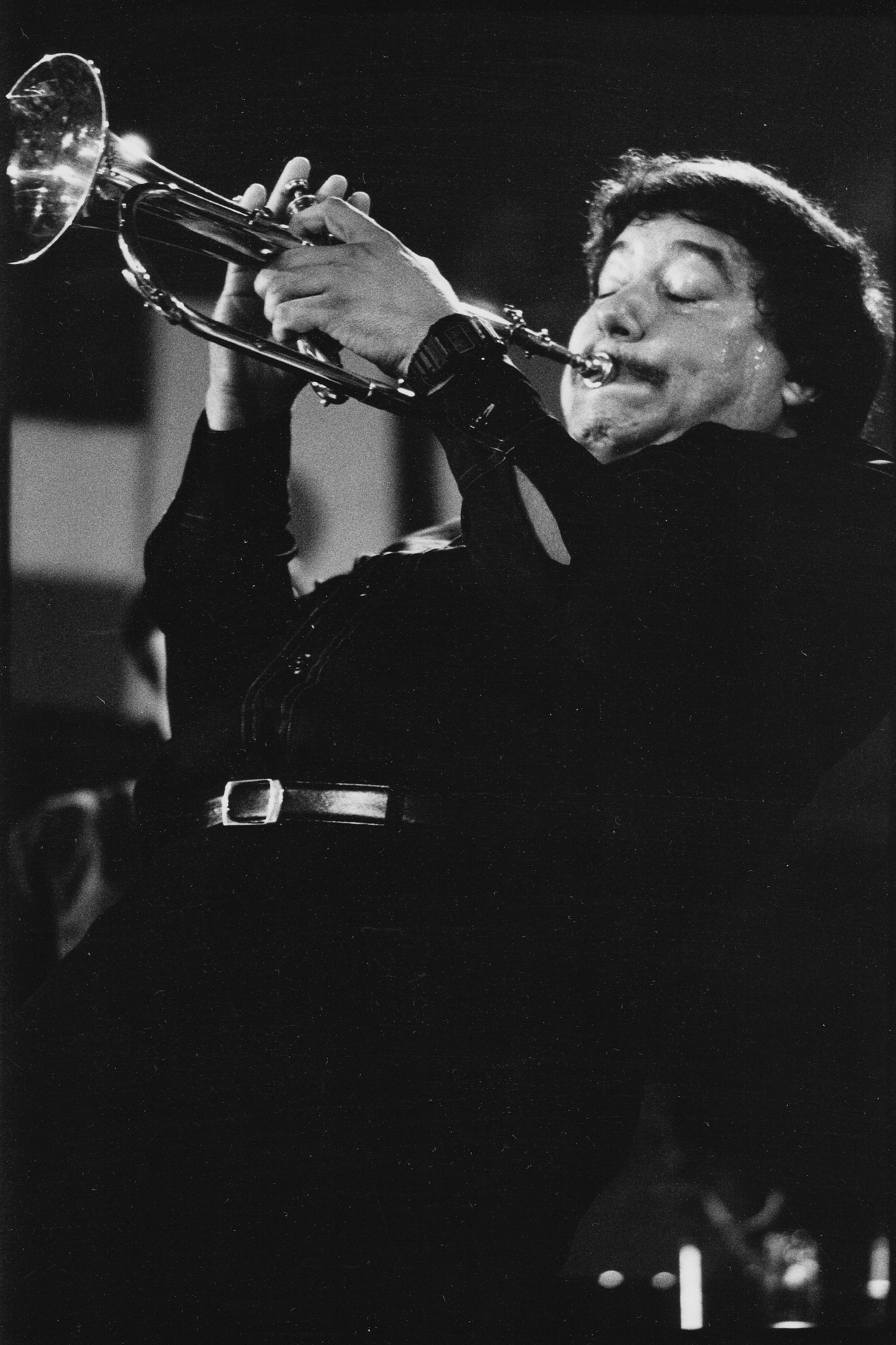
Arturo Sandoval in 1984.

"Jazz bands" began forming in Cuba as early as the 1920s, performing popular Cuban music, North American jazz and show tunes. The movement of blending Afro-Cuban rhythms with jazz, however, took longer to form. Meanwhile, Afro-Cuban jazz was developing earlier in New York, with bands such as Machito and his Afro-Cubans gaining popularity there in the 1940s. Leonardo Acosta argues the style developed in Havana at the same time, but as a quieter, almost unnoticed process. Cuba's significant contribution to the genre came later on, though the sound was starting to take shape by 1948, with free-form jam sessions called 'descargas' at the Tropicana Club. In the 1950s the sound was beginning to be recorded by Bebo Valdés, but the movement stalled following the 1959 Cuban Revolution, after which jazz music was discouraged by the incoming Castro government, most nightclubs closed, and many musicians fled the country. By 1967, though, it had begun to reemerge through the prominent state-backed Orquesta Cubana de Música Moderna, whose pianist, Chucho Valdés, would go on to form Irakere, alongside several fellow members, in 1973.

=== Orquesta Cubana de Música Moderna ===
With Irakere, a new era in Cuban jazz begins in 1973, one that will extend all the way to the present. At the same time, this period represents the culmination of a series of individual and collective efforts from our so-called transition period, which will end with the Orquesta Cubana de Música Moderna. Irakere was in part a product of the Moderna, as its founding members completed their musical training in that orchestra and also played jazz in the different quartets and quintets that were created with the OCMM. Among the founders of Irakere were pianist Chucho Valdés, its director since the beginning; saxophonist Paquito D'Rivera, who acted as assistant director; trumpet player Jorge Varona; guitarist Carlos Emilio Morales; bassist Carlos del Puerto; drummer Bernardo García; and percussionist Oscar Valdés II, also a singer—Acosta (2003: 211).

That was a time where jazz music was a four-letter word in Cuba – literally! After many years of that thought, in 1967, they decided to create the Orquesta [Cubana de Música Moderna]. There were a lot of left wing people going to Cuba, attending congresses and visiting. So the government decided to create an image that jazz was not forbidden and that nothing was forbidden there. So they created the Orquesta to play American music – that is incredible. It was to create a different image than what they had created all those years. So they created the Orquesta. I directed the band for two years. . . . When I decided that I wanted to play only jazz in the Orquesta, then I got fired . . . . and after a while, the Orquesta ceased to achieve the function that it was created for and it disappeared—D'Rivera (2011: web).

Irakere exhibit their uniquely Cuban music education: Afro-Cuban folkloric music, Cuban popular dance music, funk, jazz, and classical music. The early years saw a lot of experimenting, with new styles of genre mixing. Today, much of Irakere's early experiments sound idiosyncratic. Still, these early experiments by the group were musical landmarks, that maintain an impact today.

=== "Cubanized" bebop-flavored horn lines ===
"Chékere-son" (1976) for example, introduced a style of "Cubanized" bebop-flavored lines, that departed from the more "angular" guajeo-based lines typical of Cuban popular music.

"Chékere-son" is an extremely interesting one. It's based on a 1945 Charlie Parker bebop composition called "Billie's Bounce." Almost every phrase of the Parker song can be found in "Chékere-son" but it's all jumbled together in a very clever and compelling way. David Peñalosa sees the track as a pivotal one – perhaps the first really satisfying fusion of clave and bebop horn lines—Moore (2011: web).

The horn line style introduced in "Chékere-son" is heard today in Afro-Cuban jazz, and the contemporary popular dance genre known as timba.

=== Afro-Cuban folkloric/jazz fusion ===
Another important Irakere contribution is their use of batá and other Afro-Cuban folkloric drums. "Bacalao con pan" is the first song recorded by Irakere to use batá. The tune combines the folkloric drums, jazzy dance music, and distorted electric guitar with wah-wah pedal. According to UC Irvine musicologist and Irakere expert Raúl A. Fernández, the Orquesta Cubana de Música Moderna members would not have been allowed by the orquesta to record the unconventional song. The musicians travelled to Santiago to record it. "somehow the tune made it from Santiago to radio stations in Havana where it became a hit; Irakere was formally organized a little bit later" (2011: web).

Ironically, several of the founding members did not always appreciate Irakere's fusion of jazz and Afro-Cuban elements. They saw the Cuban folk elements as a type of nationalistic "fig leaf," cover for their true love—jazz. They were obsessed with jazz. The fusing of Afro-Cuban elements with jazz in Irakere is a direct consequence of the poor relations between the Cuban and United States governments. Cuba's Ministry of Culture is said to have viewed jazz as the music of "imperialist America." Trumpeter Arturo Sandoval states: "We wanted to play bebop, but we were told that our drummer couldn’t even use cymbals, because they sounded 'too jazzy.' We eventually used congas and cowbells instead, and in the end, it helped us to come up with something new and creative" (2007: web). Pablo Menéndez, founder of Mezcla, recalls: "Irakere were jazz musicians who played stuff like 'Bacalao con pan' with a bit of a tongue in cheek attitude—'for the masses.' I remember Paquito d'Rivera thought it was pretty funny stuff (as opposed to 'serious' stuff)" (2011: web). In spite of the ambivalence by some members towards Irakere's Afro-Cuban folkloric/jazz fusion, their experiments forever changed Cuban popular music, Latin jazz, and salsa. As D'Rivera states: "We didn’t know that we were going to have such an impact in jazz and Latin music around the world. We were just working to do something good" (2011: web).

=== International acclaim ===
"Latin jazz-rock for real, from Cuba. They're hot, they have amazing chops, and they've absorbed four continents' worth of music—who else would back an African 'mass' (explosive) with a Mozart adagio (unintegrated)? Next time I hope they get to record in a studio rather than a concert."

— Review of Irakere in Christgau's Record Guide: Rock Albums of the Seventies (1981)

In 1977 Irakere performed at two jazz festivals held in the "Eastern Bloc"—the Belgrade Jazz Festival and the Warsaw Jazz Jamboree. The group had the opportunity to play along with jazz artists Betty Carter, Mel Lewis and Thad Jones. That same year several jazz legends including Dizzy Gillespie, Stan Getz, and Earl Hines travelled to Cuba on a "jazz cruise." This was the first time since the break in relations between Cuba and the United States that a group of jazz musicians from each country were able to play together. In Havana, members of Irakere had the good fortune to jam with Gillespie and Getz. Gillespie later told the press that he had fulfilled a long-standing wish to visit the island, homeland of his close friend and partner Chano Pozo. In 1978 Irakere appeared at both the Newport Jazz Festival in New York and Rhode Island and the Montreux Jazz Festival in Switzerland. Columbia Records edited an album of five tracks recorded at the two festivals. The LP was titled Irakere, and was released by both CBS Records (JC-35655) and EGREM (Areíto LD-3769). The album had two sets of liner notes, one by the North American John Storm Roberts and the other by Cuban Leonardo Acosta. Irakere won a Grammy in 1979 for the best "Latin" music recording in the United States.

Following this success, the band participated in the most important international jazz festivals. At the 1995 Afrocubanismo Festival at the Banff Center in Alberta, Canada, Irakere performed their piece "Xiomara" live on stage with Los Muñequitos de Matanzas and Changuito (!Afrocubanismo Live!).

=== Innovations in popular dance music ===
In the 1980s Irakere recorded dance music, rhythmically akin to the contemporaneous style known as songo. This body of material can be seen as a type of bridge, connecting the songo era with the timba era which began in the early 1990s. One of the more popular Irakere dance tunes is "Rucu rucu a Santa Clara" (1985), written by José Luis Cortés "El Tosco," who would later found NG La Banda, and launch the timba movement. Trumpeter José Crego "El Greco," and saxophonists Carlos Averhoff and Germán Velazco, are heard playing the bop-like horn lines in this dance music. The three wind players would later become part of NG La Banda's "metales de terror" horn section, the basic template for timba horns. Irakere continued recording dance pieces into the 1990s.

With Babalú Ayé (1997), the band fully embraced timba, the new genre which had resulted in part from Irakere's innovations two decades earlier. The CD, which was nominated for a Grammy, features singer and timbales player José Miguel. In contrast to the impeccably executed dance music on the CD, Babalú Ayé also contains a long "bonus track"—"Babalú Ayé'," a loose folkloric/jazz experiment featuring the legendary lead vocalist Lazaro Ros.

Chucho Valdés left the group in 1997. His son Chuchito took over the piano chair and the role of director between 1997 and 1999.

=== Irakere's jazz legacy ===
Paquito D'Rivera defected to the United States in 1980. Arturo Sandoval left the group a year later, then defected to the United States in 1990. Both musicians have commented on the joy they felt at finally being able to pursue jazz careers in the U.S., and the honor of playing alongside their jazz heroes. As time passed, D'Rivera gained a deeper appreciation for the music of his first home. In 1994, he said he fell in love with Cuban music again on the shores of the Hudson River. Since he left Cuba, D'Rivera has recorded several albums with Cuban themes, including La Habana-Rio Conexión (1992), 40 Years of Cuban Jam Session (1994), Habanera Absolute Ensemble (1999), and Tropicana Nights (1999). Sandoval, who was once threatened with imprisonment by the Cuban government for listening to American jazz on the radio, has recorded straight-ahead jazz albums as well as jazz with a strong Cuban influence. Chucho Valdés has pursued a successful jazz career, recording for the prestigious Blue Note jazz label.

== Discography ==
- 1974: Teatro Amadeo Roldán – Recital. Areíto LD-3420
- 1976: Grupo Irakere. Areíto LP-3420 (issued as Chekere in Finland; CULP-7)
- 1978: Musica cubana contemporanea. Areíto LD-3726
- 1978: Leo Brouwer / Irakere. Areíto LD-3769
- 1979: Grupo Irakere. Areíto LD-3926
- 1979: Irakere. Columbia/CBS JC-35655. Areíto LD-3769
- 1979: Chekere-son. LD-3660
- 1979: The Best of Irakere. Columbia/Legacy CD 57719
- 1980: Irakere II Columbia/CBS JC-36107. Areito/Integra EG-13047
- 1980: El Coco
- 1980: Cuba Libre (2010 CD reissue on Far Out Recordings)
- 1981: Live in Sweden
- 1981: Para bailar son.
- 1982: Volume VI. Areíto LD-4018
- 1983: Calzada Del Cerro. Areíto LD-4053
- 1983: Orquesta sinfónica nacional; La colección v. VIII. Areíto LD-4139
- 1985: Bailando así; La colección Volume IX. Areíto LD-4186
- 1985: Tierra En Trance; La colección v. X. Areíto LD-4224
- 1985: Quince minutos; La colección v. XI. Areíto LD-4267
- 1986: Catalina
- 1987: Live at Ronnie Scott's; The Legendary Irakere in London
- 1987: Misa Negra. Messidor CD
- 1987: Hay Mucho Que Contar. Areito LPS-99.925
- 1989: Homenaje a Beny Moré
- 1991: Great Moments
- 1991: Felicidad
- 1995: Bailando Así
- 1996: !Afrocubanismo Live! Chucho Valdés and Irakere. Bembe CD 2012–2
- 1997: Babalú Ayé. Bembe CD 2020–2
- 1998: From Havana With Love West Wind CD 2223 (Recorded live in Belgrade 1978)
- 1999: Indestructible
- 1999: Yemayá. Blue Note CD
- 2001: Pare Cochero
