= Miguel Villafruela =

Cuban musician (born 1955)

Miguel Villafruela (born in Holguín, Cuba, 1955) is a Cuban saxophonist.

== Academic background ==
Miguel Villafruela began studying saxophone in his hometown of Holguín, Cuba, and continued them at the National School of Arts in Havana, with professors Osvaldo González and Carlos Averhoff where he graduated in 1976. At a later time he went to study with Daniel Deffayet at the Conservatoire National de Musique in Paris, and won the Premier Prix de Saxophone in 1982. He also received a Masters of Arts diploma at the Universidad de Chile and a Doctorate in Music from the Instituto Superior de Arte.

== Work as performer ==
Miguel Villafruela has performed extensively throughout the world. He has appeared with the National symphony orchestras of Chile, Montevideo, Buenos Aires, Bogotá, Prague, Gulbenkian (Lisbon) and the Slovakian Chamber Orchestra among many others; and has performed in Montreal, Quebec City, Caracas, Teatro Colón de Buenos Aires, Tokyo, Berlin, Madrid, Cochabamba, Valencia, Helsinki, Managua, Sofia, Salle Cortot de Paris, Annecy, Warsaw, Kraków, Mexico, Lisbon, Vilnius, Riga, Budapest, Brussels, and other cities of the Americas, Europe and Asia. He has also performed at numerous international festivals such as the Bourges Electroacoustic Music Festival and World Saxophone Congresses in Nuremberg (1982), Maryland (1985), Tokyo (1988) and Valencia (1997) as well as at Saxophonies (Angers, France, 1990), in celebration of 150th anniversary of the saxophone.

Villafruela includes in his ample repertoire the most significant works for solo saxophone, saxophone and orchestra, saxophone accompanied by electroacoustic media, or by piano and diverse instruments. He is an expert in contemporary music and has commissioned numerous works from important composers, while others have dedicated their works to him. His extensive catalog include works by Juan Orrego Salas, Sergio Barroso, Juan Piñera and Armando Rodriguez Ruidiaz, among many others.

== Pedagogic work ==
Villafruela is considered an authority on the saxophone performance technique and repertoire. He founded the saxophone faculty at the Instituto Superior de Artes of Cuba in 1982, and taught there until 1993. By invitation of the University of Chile Music Department he founded in 1994 the first higher education Saxophone Faculty in that country. He has been Titular Professor at the Arts Faculty of the University of Chile. Villafruela has taught clinics for Vandoren, Selmer and BG in Argentine and Chile. He is frequently invited to give Master Classes at renowned music institutions all over the world.

== Awards and recognitions ==
Miguel Villafruela has received numerous awards from such reputable institutions as the International Rostrum of Young Interpreters (Bratislava, 1979), the Leopold Bellan Contest (1980), the Pyongyant Festival (1990), the National Order of Culture in Cuba (1986) and of the Chilean's Society of Composers in 2001. He has also received the Grand Prize from EGREM, Cuba, for the CD Saxofón del Siglo. In 2002, the Cuban Instituto Superior de Arte awarded him its Diploma for Artistic Merit and in 2003, the University of Chile distinguished him as "Mejor Docente de Pregrado".
