= Carlos Averhoff =

Cuban jazz musician (1947–2016)

Carlos Averhoff (December 6, 1947 – December 23, 2016) was a Cuban jazz musician primarily known for playing tenor saxophone. He has been called "Carlos Averhoff 'Sax'". He was lastly based in Miami, Florida. He was born in Matanzas, and in Cuba initially had classical training. In 1973 he replaced Paquito D'Rivera at the "Orquesta Cubana de Música Moderna (OCMM)" as the government had declared him "reactionary." He was also involved in Timba music. His son Carlos Averhoff, Jr "Sax" is also a musician. Averhoff died at the age of 69 in Miami, Florida, in 2016.

== Teaching career ==
Averhoff has been Professor of Music at Florida International University School of Music in Miami, Florida. He also served as Professor of Saxophone at Miami-Dade College. In this position he has taught hundreds of saxophonists, many who have gone on to become teachers in their own right. His students teach and perform in teaching and performing positions throughout the world.

His students include:

- Miguel Villafruela
- Luis Nubiola
- Carlos Averhoff Jr.
- Hammadi Bayard
