= Carlos Emilio Morales =

Cuban jazz guitarist (1939–2014)

Carlos Emilio Morales (November 6, 1939 Havana – November 12, 2014 Havana) was a Cuban jazz guitarist.

== Selected discography ==
- Irakere (1979)
- Havana Jam (1979)
- The Legendary Irakere in London (1987)
- Homenaje a Beny Moré (1989)
- Misa Negra (1992)
- Bebo Rides Again (1994)
- Cuba Jazz (1996)
- Night at Ronnie Scott's, Vol. 4 (1996)
- United Nations of Messidor (1996)
- Nu Yorica 2!: Further Adventures in Latin Music Chang (1998)
- Babalu Ayé (1999)
- Afro Cuban Jazz Now (2001)
- Afro Cuban Trombone (2003)
- Lost Sessions (2003)
- Arturo Sandoval & The Latin Jazz Orchestra (2007)
- Tata Güines (2007)
- Irakere 1978 World Tour (2008)
- Chucho Valdés and his Combo (2008)
- Fania All-Stars Havana Jam 2 (2009)
- Orquesta Cubana de Música Moderna (2009)
